= Steve Vizard =

Australian businessman and television personality (born 1956)

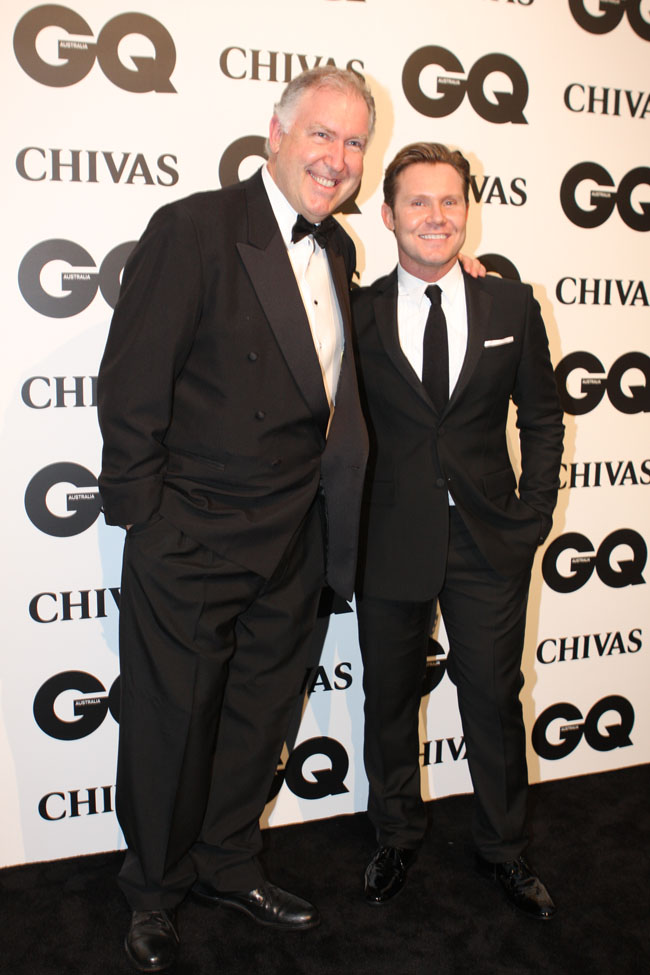
- Vizard (left) with GQ editor Nick Smith in 2011
- Born: Stephen William Vizard; 6 March 1956 (age 70); Richmond, Victoria, Australia
- Occupations: Television presenter; radio presenter; comedian; screenwriter; author; producer; lawyer
- Years active: 1976−present
- Spouse: Sarah Jane Wilmoth
- Children: 5
- Parents: Godfrey Lancelot Pitt Vizard; June Elizabeth Purtell

Stephen William Vizard (born 6 March 1956) is an Australian television and radio presenter, producer, writer, lawyer and businessman. He is a research professor at Monash University and the University of Adelaide.

Vizard has written popular and academic books on topics ranging from Australia's population policy to national myths, including Nation, Memory, Myth. He has also written for theatre, including the opera Banquet of Secrets, the musical Vigil, and The Last Man Standing, the Melbourne Theatre Company's centenary Gallipoli production.

He has written for and produced various Logie and AFI award-winning television shows—from Fast Forward to Kangaroo Palace—and hosted his own five-night-a-week national tonight show, Tonight Live with Steve Vizard, for which he was three times nominated and won a Gold Logie in 1991. On radio, he has broadcast on the Austereo, Fairfax and Macquarie networks, and in 2011 was nominated for Best Talkback Presenter in Australia.

Vizard founded one of Australia’s largest independent production houses, Artist Services, which was subsequently sold to ITV. He has been president of the National Gallery of Victoria and chairman of the Victorian Major Events Company, which secured events such as the World Swimming Championships (FINA World Aquatics Championships), World Cycling Championships (UCI Road World Championships), World Gymnastics Championships (World Artistic Gymnastics Championships), World Cup Soccer (FIFA World Cup), International Rugby Tests, Australian Fashion Week, the Australian Film Institute Awards (AACTA Awards), and devised the annual cultural exhibition programme Melbourne Winter Masterpieces. He has appeared on the cover of Time and Rolling Stone; was an elected representative to the 1998 Australian Constitutional Convention; and was Father of the Year in 2001.

Vizard was embroiled in three highly publicised legal proceedings, resulting in civil penalties in 2005 for breaching directors' duties.

== Early life ==
Vizard was born in Melbourne, Australia, on 6 March 1956, the son of Godfrey Lancelot Pitt Vizard and June Purtell. He grew up in the Melbourne suburb of Hawthorn and was educated at Hawthorn West Primary School and Carey Baptist Grammar School. His father, Godfrey, had been a patrol officer in Papua New Guinea in the early 1950s and had been involved in exploring and mapping the uncharted Gulf region around Kerema, including making first contact with native Kukukuku. As a teenager, Vizard was raised on a bush property in the semi-rural suburb of Warrandyte.

After finishing high school in 1973, Vizard won a scholarship to study law and arts (philosophy), at the University of Melbourne, where he resided at Whitley College and later St Mary's College, and graduated in 1980. From 1981 to 1986, he practised law as a partner in a Melbourne law firm and until 1988 worked as an international commercial negotiator for multinational RTZ (Rio Tinto Zinc), mainly in Britain and Germany.

== Performing ==
In 1976, while at Melbourne University, Vizard appeared in the Archi (Architects') Revue and the following year he and fellow university students established, wrote and produced the university's inaugural Le Law Revue. After being spotted in the revue, Vizard wrote material for the inner Melbourne comedy scene. Between 1976 and 1982, while still studying at Melbourne University, Vizard wrote and performed in over a dozen productions, working at such theatres and cabarets as The Last Laugh and the Flying Trapeze with a variety of local performers including Rod Quantock, Wendy Harmer, Glenn Robbins, Peter Moon and Paul Grabowsky, who would later work with Vizard as the band leader on his Tonight Live show.

From 1979 to 1985, Vizard was the voice-over man for the racing show Punter to Punter, starring Trevor Marmalade, Dr Turf and Con Marasco (Tony Rickards), on community radio station Triple R.

In 1985 Vizard co-wrote and produced a feature film, The Bit Part, starring Nicole Kidman, for which he was nominated for a Writers' Guild award for Best Feature Film Screenplay.

In 1987 he was the head writer and a performer on a television sketch comedy show, The Eleventh Hour, which kick-started the television careers of Vizard, Mary-Anne Fahey, Mark Mitchell, Glenn Robbins, Ian McFadyen and Peter Moon. In 1987, Vizard performed in the first Melbourne International Comedy Festival, launched by Peter Cook, and was one of the hosts of the Comedy Festival Gala in 1991.

In 1989, Vizard established, wrote and produced the primetime sketch comedy series Fast Forward. The series was Australia's highest rating comedy series. Fast Forward, and its successor program, Full Frontal, ran for 10 years and won multiple Logie Awards. Vizard's characters on Fast Forward included advertising guru Brent Smyth (with Peter Moon), Darryl (the gay airline steward, with Michael Veitch), "Fakari" rug salesman Roger Ramshett (with Peter Moon), and newsreaders Dirk Hartog. He also performed impersonations, most notably of Derryn Hinch, Richard Carleton, Don Lane, Ian Turpie, George Donikian, Geoffrey Robertson and even Gough Whitlam in one instance.

Between 1990 and 1993 Vizard hosted his own high rating nightly national talk show, Tonight Live with Steve Vizard. He interviewed over a thousand guests, from entertainment legends including Bob Hope, Audrey Hepburn, Mickey Rooney, and Kirk Douglas, to musical stars including Phil Collins, Bob Geldof, Peter Allen, Quincy Jones and B. B. King, to writers and filmmakers such as Jeffrey Archer, Edward de Bono, Robert Ludlum, Sir Peter Ustinov and Oliver Stone, to comedians such as Spike Milligan, Sir Harry Secombe, Phyllis Diller, Spinal Tap, Robin Williams to Prime Ministers and public leaders.

By 1994, when he retired from on-air roles, Vizard had been nominated for a Gold Logie as Australia's most popular television performer on four occasions, winning in 1991. He had also won three further Logie Awards as Australia's most Popular Television Presenter as well as four Television Society Awards, a Variety Club for Best Comedy Artiste and a Rolling Stone magazine award for Best Television Performer.

Vizard hosted many awards nights and concerts including the 1992 Logie Awards, the Bali Bombing Memorial Concert and the 1995 nationally televised 50th Anniversary of the End of World War Two Concert. During Vizard's hosting of the 1994 Australian Film Institute Awards, he joked about Australian screen legend Bill Hunter, who had appeared in several nominated movies that year, "each and every nominated film must feature Bill Hunter. This is a pro-rata rule ... Short films may enter into a Bill Hunter-sharing arrangement."

In 1998 Vizard performed with the Melbourne Symphony Orchestra, narrating Saint-Saëns' The Carnival of the Animals.

At the 2006 Logie Awards, Vizard appeared with long-time collaborator Michael Veitch in a sketch that reprised one of their most famous roles, that of two camp, bitchy airline stewards.

Since 2009, Vizard has appeared as a regular on various television shows including Tens Talkin' 'Bout Your Generation, Nine's Today Show and A Current Affair. Vizard has also appeared in a regular role in Mick Molloy's Foxtel comedy series, The Jesters.

In July 2011, Vizard appeared in the television movie Beaconsfield, playing the late 60 Minutes reporter Richard Carleton in the drama about the Beaconsfield Mine collapse in Tasmania and the rescue of miners Todd Russell and Brant Webb 14 days later.

In 2010, Vizard was nominated for a lifetime achievement award for outstanding contribution to the Film & Television Industry.

From 2010 he has appeared as a regular weekly panelist on Channel Ten's prime time 7PM Project and The Project and has filled in for one of the shows hosts, Dave Hughes. He was a panelist and interviewer on the 7PM Project's controversial interview with St Kilda sex scandal schoolgirl Kim in which the interviewers were clearly sceptical about her attempts to withdraw her previous allegations—the show aired her post-interview confession that she had just lied to them.

In 2013, 2014 and 2015 Vizard appeared as a regular "Agony Uncle" in the ABC's primetime series The Agony of Christmas, The Agony of Modern Manners and The Agony. He was the one of lead actors in the 2014 award-winning Tropfest film Granny Smith and was a contributor to the ABC documentary about the history of Australian comedy, Stop Laughing...This Is Serious.

In 2022 he performed in a celebrity tribute to Australian comedian and actor Paul Hogan, Roast of Paul Hogan, which was broadcast on Australia's Seven Network.

== Film and television production ==
In 1989 Vizard established the independent production company Artist Services with his fellow writer and producer, Andrew Knight. From 1989 to 2002 when Vizard retired as chairman, Artist Services grew to one of the three largest production companies in Australia.

During that time Vizard and Knight acted as Executive Producers of over 1,400 hours of prime time television shows including several series of ABC drama series SeaChange and several award-winning mini series such as Kangaroo Palace. He was the Executive Producer of Big Girl's Blouse starring Jane Turner, Gina Riley, Magda Szubanski and Marg Downey, which created and first showcased the popular comedic characters Kath & Kim.

In 1996, Vizard's Artist Services founded and owned with Foxtel, the comedy channel. During Vizard's chairmanship, the comedy channel produced and broadcast over 80 hours each year of original Australian programming, commissioning emerging writers and performers including This Is Gary Petty (starring Brian Nankervis, Francis Greenslade, Matt Cameron); Off Road (starring Lawrence Mooney); The Fifty Foot Show (starring Paul Fenech and Kitty Flanagan); Home and Hosed (starring Shane Bourne, Bob Franklin and Ross Daniels); Small Tales and True (Roz Hammond and Robyn Butler). Vizard remained Chairman of the comedy channel until 2001.

As executive producer, Artist Services shows have been distributed internationally and received numerous awards including over 20 Logies, a dozen AFI, Writers Guild and Television Society awards and an International Emmy nomination. Together with Knight, Vizard developed and was the executive producer of several feature films, including The Sound of One Hand Clapping (based on the award-winning novel by Richard Flanagan) and Dead Letter Office (starring Miranda and Barry Otto).

In 1995, Vizard sold half of the shares in his company Artist Services to John Fairfax Holdings. In 2000 Vizard sold his remaining 50% shares in Artist Services to UK based media company Granada . Vizard remained as chairman until 2002 when he resigned to spend more time on other business and creative interests.

Since 2002, Vizard has been involved in advising emerging Australian talent. He was a consultant to Network Tens comedy show, The Wedge, casting and working with Rebel Wilson, Jason Gann, Adam Zwar.

From 2003 he has been a consultant to one of Australia's largest talent management companies, Profile Talent, whose clients include Hamish & Andy, Dannii Minogue, Matt Preston and Sonia Kruger.

In 2010, Vizard executive produced a reality series about Dannii Minogue, Dannii Minogue: Style Queen, which was co-produced with ITV and broadcast in the UK on ITV and in Australia on Foxtel.

== Other contributions ==
From 1990 to 2005, in addition to his on and off air roles with Artist Services, Vizard pursued a number of other business interests and public service roles.

In 1996, was appointed a director of the telecommunications company Telstra, a position he held until his decision to retire from 17 September 2000 and not stand for re-election to the board.

As President of the Screen Producers Association of Australia from 1995 to 1997, Vizard was an advocate for the establishment by the Australian Government of the Australian Commercial Television Production Fund to produce high quality Australian television drama telemovies and series. Vizard subsequently served on the Board of the ACTPF from 1995 to 1998.

Vizard has been an advocate for promoting Australian-made content on Australian television, radio and media. In delivering his 1999 Andrew Olle Media Lecture, Vizard advocated the need to maintain Australian quotas for all Australian commercial television networks as well as proposing that the Australian Broadcasting Corporation should be more fully funded and should commission and broadcast exclusively Australian content.

In 1998, Vizard was elected as a delegate for his home state of Victoria to the 1998 Australian Constitutional Convention in Canberra, representing the Australian Republic Movement. After the constitutional convention, Vizard wrote the book Two Weeks in Lilliput: Bear Baiting and Backbiting at the Constitutional Convention. The book became a best seller and was a prescribed text on the NSW HSC syllabus.

From 1998 to 2005, Vizard was the president of the Council of Trustees of the National Gallery of Victoria. Under Vizard's presidency, the gallery commenced and completed two extensive building programs: the $150 million renovation of the International Gallery to house the International collection; and the $400 million construction and opening of the new Ian Potter Centre: NGV Australia, the only major public art gallery in the world dedicated to Australian art.

From 2001 to 2005, Vizard was chairman of the Victorian Major Events Company which attracts major sporting, arts and cultural events to Victoria and Australia. During Vizard's chairmanship events won by VMEC for Australia included the World Cycling Championships, World Gymnastics Championships, World Cup Soccer Qualifiers, International Rugby Tests, the renewal of the Australian Formula One Grand Prix, World Superbike Championships, World Swimming Championships, Mercedes Australian Fashion Week, and others.

In February 2002 Vizard was the convenor with the Premier of Victoria of a National Population Summit at which 50 of Australia's most prominent leaders spoke to over 1,000 delegates in a bipartisan debate about all aspects of Australia's population. The bipartisan resolutions from the Summit and the speeches were edited by Vizard and published by Penguin in Australia's Population Debate.

Other organisations with which he has acted as a director or a trustee include Film Australia, Australian Children's Television Foundation and the Transport Accident Corporation. From 1997 to 2005, Vizard served as a member of the committee of the Melbourne Cricket Club.

== Writing and publications ==
In addition to writing for theatre, television and film, Vizard has written and edited several books, including a 2008 biography of Graham Kennedy, Graham Kennedy Treasures: Friends Remember the King which he co-wrote with Mike McColl-Jones. Other books include Best Australian Humorous Writing, Melbourne University Press, 2008), Australia's Population Challenge (with Hugh J. Martin and Tim Watts); Two Weeks in Lilliput, an account of Vizard's experiences attending the 1998 Australian Constitutional Convention; and The Top Seven Lists from 'Tonight live with Steven Vizard'. In 2025, Melbourne University Press published Nation, Memory, Myth: Gallipoli and the Australian Imaginary, in which Vizard dissects the common elements of national myths that transform them into symbolic performances of cultural memory and kinship, through investigation of Australia’s foundation myth of Gallipoli.

Vizard's one man play Coles Funny Picture Person, based on the life of the eccentric Victorian bookseller Edward William Cole, was performed by AFI award-winning actor Norman Kaye. Vizard wrote with composer Paul Grabowsky a theatre work with music, Last Man Standing, for the Melbourne Theatre Company as their production for the Anzac and Gallipoli commemorations in 2015. Also with Grabowsky he wrote the song cycle The Space Between for soprano Emma Matthews in 2018. With Joe Chindamo, he wrote the musical Vigil.

Vizard has been the recipient of an Australia Council grant for Poetry and a University of Melbourne Writers Fellowship. He was nominated for a Writers Guild Award for Best Feature Film Screenplay in 1985; and won (as a co-writer) Writers Guild Awards for Best Comedy Television in 1989, 1990, 1992 and 1993.

== Legal proceedings ==
In the early 2000s, Vizard became involved in three separate legal proceedings, primarily related to the activities of the Vizard family's former bookkeeper, Roy Hilliard. In 2001 the Vizard family reported to the police money missing from their family accounts, and Hilliard was subsequently charged with stealing and falsifying the accounts of the Vizard family companies, and in 2005 Hilliard was convicted of falsifying accounts. This led to Hilliard's conviction and sentence to three years jail.

In the second legal proceedings, Hilliard faced civil action related to the allegations of misappropriating money from the Vizard companies, with Vizard's bank Westpac commencing civil proceedings against Hilliard in 2001. Westpac had conducted an investigation of the fraud and paid out to Vizard's companies some of the money the bookkeeper had taken, and then sued the bookkeeper to recover some of the payout. Vizard was a witness in Westpac's action. In December 2006, the Supreme Court of Victoria found in favour of Westpac and ordered Hilliard to repay over $2 million in funds misappropriated from the Vizards to the bank, plus interest. The judge also rejected claims Hilliard had made against Vizard relating to the use of overseas tax havens and that Hilliard had returned the stolen moneys to Vizard. In September 2009, an appeal by Hilliard against the judgement against him was rejected by the Full Court of the Supreme Court of Victoria, which affirmed that Hilliard had misappropriated over $3 million from Vizard, rejected Hilliard's claims against Vizard, and ordered Hilliard to repay the missing moneys and costs.

The third legal action involved Vizard directly and arose out of allegations made by Hilliard in 2003 at the criminal trial of his former bookkeeper. Hilliard alleged that Vizard had insider traded while a director of Telstra. The Australian Securities and Investments Commission (ASIC) followed-up the allegations with an 18-month investigation, including searching Vizard's home and office in December 2003. ASIC then formally advised that it would not continue the investigation, as it had no evidence sufficient to prosecute Vizard for inside trading or any other crime.

On 28 July 2005, the Commonwealth Director of Public Prosecutions formally announced that they had no provable evidence to proceed with any criminal case against Vizard. The Commonwealth Director of Public Prosecutions Damian Bugg QC along with ASIC Chairman Jeff Lucy vigorously denied assertions by some sections of the media that they had "gone soft" on Vizard. ASIC Chairman Lucy made clear to the Parliament in his report of 13 September 2005 that there had never been any provable criminal case against Vizard despite the most vigorous examination by ASIC, and that this lack of any criminal case against Vizard was a view shared by both ASIC and the Attorney General:

In this case, criminal charges were not pursued against Mr. Vizard because the DPP was not satisfied that there was admissible, substantial and reliable evidence of the offence and therefore there were not reasonable prospects of securing a conviction…Whilst this was a decision for the DPP, it was also consistent with senior counsel advice that ASIC had independently received ... When ASIC announced on 4 July that we were pursuing civil penalties against Mr. Vizard, there were some suggestions in the press that we had gone soft or that we had somehow been nobbled by government. I have unequivocally rejected those suggestions. They are entirely without foundation.

Separately, later in 2005 ASIC said it would commence civil proceedings against Vizard for breaching his director's duties on three occasions. ASIC's case was that Vizard had breached sections 183 and 232 of the Corporations Act 2001 (C'th). Vizard and ASIC settled the civil proceedings in 2005 on the basis that Vizard would not contest them, that ASIC made no allegations of dishonesty against Vizard, that a fine of $390,000 be imposed and Vizard agree to be disqualified from acting as a company director for between 3 and 5 years. That settlement took the form of an "agreed statement of facts" jointly presented to the Federal Court by Vizard's and ASIC's lawyers, and Vizard agreeing the court should impose penalties for a breach of his duties as a director. In his judgement handed down on 28 July 2005, Justice Raymond Finkelstein accepted that Vizard had breached sections 183 and 232 of the Corporations Act 2001 (C'lth) through his activities. ASIC proposed a $130,000 fine per offence and 5 years disqualification. Justice Finkelstein disregarded the agreement reached between ASIC and Vizard and instead ordered a disqualification of 10 years.

The head of ASIC, Jeff Lucy, conceded that there was never a criminal case, or any case involving dishonesty, against Vizard and that the media outrage was largely caused by ASIC's failure to properly communicate the full facts to the media.

The mistake we made with the Vizard communication was that we did not adequately address the reaction to what we were putting to the public by the media...Our investigation was thorough. We came to a view, which was of course based on the admissible evidence, that a criminal prosecution would not be successful. Having said that, there was no doubt that there was some quite significant media issues for ASIC and indeed myself as chairman. We were not as well prepared for those as we should have been, and because the matter was before the court, our opportunity to correct the record was very significantly reduced. The Vizard case provided a number of lessons for us, and hopefully we have dealt with our communications with the media a lot more effectively since. Jeff Lucy, The Age, 14 May 2007.

== Philanthropic activities and awards ==
In 1991, Vizard and his family founded the Vizard Foundation, which established Vizard House, a refuge for people in need.

Since its establishment in 1991, Vizard House has provided over 100,000-room nights free accommodation for needy people visiting inner Melbourne hospitals.

From 1992 to 2002, the Foundation worked with the Ian Potter Museum of Art, University of Melbourne to support Australian artists. The collection of Australian art is permanently housed at the University of Melbourne. On 27 April 1994, the Vizard Foundation purchased 45 antiquities from an auction held by Christie's of London. These items are on permanent loan to the Ian Potter Museum of Art at the University of Melbourne.

In 1991, Vizard purchased from Lord Alistair McAlpine the iconic Australian painting First Class Marksman by Sidney Nolan, the only painting of the original 1945 Ned Kelly Series not owned and on public display in the National Gallery of Australia. Vizard donated the painting to the Vizard Foundation and the painting was on public display in the National Gallery of Victoria. In 2010, the Vizard Foundation sold the work for an Australian record of $5.4 million and committed the proceeds for charitable purposes, including indigenous scholarships.

In 1997, Vizard was a founding trustee with Walter Mikac of the Alannah and Madeleine Foundation, to assist in education against violence to children.

In 1997, he was made a Member of the Order of Australia, for service to the community, particularly through the Vizard Foundation, and to the arts. In 2008, three years after settling the civil legal proceedings with ASIC, Vizard voluntarily handed back his membership of the Order of Australia.

In 2002, he received the Australian Father of the Year award.

In 2004 Vizard was awarded an Honorary Doctorate of Laws from Deakin University.

As of 2023 he is a research professor at Monash University and at the University of Adelaide.

== Radio ==
In February 2010, Vizard began a brief stint on Melbourne radio station Triple M, filling in for Eddie McGuire who was in Vancouver covering the Winter Olympics.

From March 2010 Vizard presented a daily Morning show on Macquarie Radio Network's Melbourne Talk Radio until the station's closure in March 2012. Vizard interviewed more than 1000 guests, including Academy Award-winning directors Peter Weir and Tom Hooper, director of The King's Speech, authors Jeffrey Archer, Booker Prize-winning Thomas Keneally, Jackie Collins, Peter Carey, Tim Flannery, Grammy-nominated musicians Faith Hill, Tim McGraw, Josh Groban, Chris Botti, George Benson, president of the World Bank James Wolfensohn, Martin Short, Christopher Hitchens, Weird Al Yankovic, Australian Prime Minister Julia Gillard and Professor Ross Garnaut.

Vizard's radio program was responsible for breaking the Christmas Island asylum seekers boat crash tragedy in December 2010. Vizard conducted the first interviews with the schoolgirl at the centre of the St Kilda Football Club scandal and with David Galbally QC before the delivery of his report into the players' scandal; and covered the Chilean mine disaster and pursued the defrocking of convicted priests by the Catholic Church, on behalf of abused victims.

A number of comedians appeared as guests or regulars on his show including Charlie Pickering, Peter Helliar, Fiona O'Loughlin, Mick Molloy and regular contributors Glenn Robbins, Corinne Grant, George McEncroe, Andrew Goodone and Shaun Micallef.

Vizard's radio show received 3 nominations at the 2011 Australian Commercial Radio Awards including Best Talk Presenter in Australia.

From 2012 Vizard broadcast Afternoons as a fill in for Dennis Walter on 3AW.

== Personal life ==
Vizard married Sarah Wilmoth in 1988 and they have five children.

In 2006 Vizard's Toorak mansion set a real estate record for Melbourne when it sold for $17.75 million after Vizard received an unsolicited knock on the door offering to buy the landmark home.

Earlier in 2006, Vizard chased three burglars who had broken into his Orrong Road, Toorak mansion. Vizard was awakened at 3am by his 16-year-old daughter who had seen an intruder in her room, and Vizard pursued the intruders into the street in the nude where he was nearly driven over by the getaway Alfa Romeo. The robber, Richard Lovett who had 93 prior convictions, was arrested later that day after becoming involved in a fight in which he stabbed a man in the chest, puncturing his lung, and was subsequently sentenced for the robbery to four years by the County Court of Victoria.

From 1990, Vizard and his family owned and ran the rural Western District station Roxby Park which they operated as a superfine wool Merino sheep stud. In 2002, Vizard sold Roxby Park to South Australian Tuna fishing magnate, Tony Šantić, the owner of three time Melbourne Cup winning horse, Makybe Diva, who renamed the property Smytzer's Lodge, and uses it as the home of his Makybe Diva breeding and bloodstock operations.

Awards and achievements
Preceded by Craig McLachlan for Neighbours	Gold Logie Award; Most Popular Personality on Australian Television; 1991 for Tonight Live with Steve Vizard and Fast Forward	Succeeded by Jana Wendt for A Current Affair
