= Magda's Funny Bits =

Australian comedy TV series

Magda's Funny Bits was a television comedy featuring Magda Szubanski that was broadcast on the Nine Network, Australia in early 2006. The Nine Network commissioned five episodes, four of which were aired prior to the 2006 Commonwealth Games.

== Format ==
The series was a sketch comedy and clip show featuring popular Szubanski characters from Fast Forward, Big Girl's Blouse and Kath & Kim.

- Mary McGregor hosted the show and told stories about her love life and family. The character is a Scottish alcoholic, who sought a scotch company as a sponsor.
- Chanelle from Chanelle's Institute de Beauty and House of Hair Removal. Chanelle first appeared in Fast Forward advertising outlandish hair and beauty products. In this series she advertised faulty products which were more threat than help. As with the Fast Forward sketches, the format was an advertorial segment on a fictional television show Mornings with Janelle. Janelle, the host, was played by Marg Downey.
- Lynne hosted an Australia's Funniest Home Videos in competition with the real life host Toni Pearen. Lynne showed funny videos in her sketches but also made fun of both Pearen and then Nine Network CEO Eddie McGuire.
- Sharon Strzelecki hosted Sharon's Wider World of Sports, a spoof of Nine's Wide World of Sport. Strzelecki showed clips of sporting disasters in her sketches and, as in Kath & Kim, had a new sporting injury in each episode.

== Reception ==
Despite Szubanski being one of Australia's most popular actors and comedians, critical and public reception of the series was poor. The West Australian described the series as "a classic example of safe but uninspired programming". The Herald Sun described it as one of the "least accurately titled shows to appear on Australian TV". The Australian and the Daily Telegraph labelled it as one of the biggest flops of 2006. The Courier-Mail was even more scathing, saying "It is truly an embarrassment. Kerry Packer would be turning in his grave." TV writer Andrew Mercado blamed the network, saying "What an abysmal thing to do to her. She's putting all those great comic characters into the worst possible scenario."

The series also performed poorly in the ratings, receiving only a quarter of the viewing audience of Dancing with the Stars.

At the conclusion of the Commonwealth Games, the fifth episode remained unaired.
