= Sacré Cœur School =

Sacré Cœur

Location
- Glen Iris, Victoria; Australia
- Coordinates: 37°51′41″S 145°3′7″E

Information
- Type: Independent, day school
- Motto: Latin: Cor Unum et anima una in corde jesu English: One heart and one mind in the heart of Jesus
- Religious affiliations: Roman Catholic (Society of the Sacred Heart)
- Established: 1888; 138 years ago
- Founder: Society of the Sacred Heart
- Chairperson: Joan Fitzpatrick
- Principal: Adelina Melia-Douvos
- Staff: Approx. 150
- Years offered: P–12
- Gender: Girls
- Enrollment: 700+ (P–12)
- Colors: Navy, turquoise, red and white
- Slogan: Sacré Cœur Women Shape the World
- Athletics conference: GSV
- Affiliation: JSHAA AHISA
- Website: www.sac.vic.edu.au

Sacré Cœur is a Roman Catholic, independent, day school for girls, located in Glen Iris, a south eastern suburb of Melbourne, Victoria, Australia.

Established in 1888, the school caters to over 700 students from Prep to Year 12 and has an open-entry policy. It offers the Victorian Certificate of Education (VCE). Sacré Cœur is a member of Girls Sport Victoria (GSV), the Junior School Heads Association of Australia and the Association of Heads of Independent Schools of Australia (AHISA) It is part of the international network of Sacré Cœur schools.

== History ==
The School was founded by the French order of nuns, the Society of the Sacred Heart (RSCJ) in 1888.

Sacré Cœur, has its origins in the vision of Madeleine Sophie Barat, who founded the Society of the Sacred Heart in Paris in 1800. Growing up during the French Revolution in the small town of Joigny about 80 miles south of Paris, Sophie felt a strong call to religious life from an early age. Although her attraction was to a strictly contemplative life, her reflections led her to the realisation that an education based on Christian values was essential for a more just society to emerge from the upheaval of the revolution.

Having an unusually strong classical education herself, she envisioned an education for girls which would develop each student's gifts to the fullest, lay the foundations for a solid, active faith including compassionate service to the poor, and awaken a thirst for lifelong learning.

== Curriculum ==
Sacre Coeur offers a range of Victorian Certificate of Education (VCE) subjects.

VCE results 2016-2025
Year	Rank	Median study score	Scores of 40+ (%)	Cohort size
2016	15	36	27.1	165
2017	18	36	26.5	156
2018	16	36	26.5	156
2019	30	35	23	154
2020	33	35	20.8	151
2021	28	35	18.6	163
2022	19	36	20.6	160
2023	14	36	27	154
2024	23	35	24.6	149
2025	50	34	18.5	139

== Houses ==
There are four Houses, named after the school's founder St Madeleine Sophie Barat and Mothers Superior of the school; Digby, Duchesne, Stuart and Barat. The four house colours are red, green, yellow and blue. The four houses annually compete in an array of inter house competitions. These competitions include House Athletics, House Swimming and the House Arts festival and house skipping.

== Sport ==
Sacré Cœur is a member of Girls Sport Victoria (GSV).

=== GSV premierships ===
Sacré Cœur has won the following GSV premierships.

- Cricket (2) – 2018, 2019
- Indoor Cricket – 2017
- Soccer – 2006
- Soccer, 5 a side (2) – 2017, 2018
- Triathlon, Mini (2) – 2016, 2017
- Softball - 2025, 2026

== Programs ==
In Year 8, students take part in a 2-week City Cite experience. The City Cite program aims to encourage high levels of personal organisation and responsibility, social competence, leadership and resilience. It gives the students an opportunity to learn in a different environment, and become familiar with their city whilst working independently and in groups. Students are accompanied and assisted by staff members throughout the City Cite experience.

In Year 9, students take part in the Notre Monde program. The program takes place in a designated part of the school, and is composed of multiple units that run for 6 weeks each. The Notre Monde program allows girls to experience learning in a broad variety of environments. It covers numerous subjects, with a few being Social Justice, Visual and Creative Arts and International studies. iPads have been integrated into the program, with every student and staff member possessing one for the duration of the year.

In Years 10 and 11, students are invited to partake in an international immersion program. The countries students are able to visit include:

- France
- Japan
- Italy
- United States
- Canada

In Year 11, students go on a three-day overnight retreat, with St Kevin's and Loreto. The focus of the retreat is on developing adult relationships and making decisions about the way they relate to their family, themselves, members of the other gender and most of all the way they personally relate to God.

== Alumnae ==
Past pupils of Sacré Cœur may elect to join The Sacré Cœur Alumnae Association (formerly known as The Sacré Cœur Old Girls' Association). The association for past pupils was founded in the 20th century. Members of the association are located in Australia as well as a variety of countries around the world. The association organizes many social outings, masses and events in conjunction with other schools such as:

- The GLS Breakfast (a speaker's luncheon with Genazzano FCJ College and Loreto Mandeville Hall)
- Sacre Coeur and St Kevin's College, Melbourne Tennis Day
- Golf competitions
- Movie nights
- Reunions

== Notable alumnae ==
- Patricia Barraclough, television producer
- Robina Courtin, Tibetan Buddhist nun
- Marg Downey, actress (Fast Forward, Big Girl's Blouse, Sit Down, Shut Up, Kath & Kim)
- Alicia Eva, AFLW Footballer
- Paige Greco, Australian paralympic cyclist (Gold medalist at the 2020 Paralympic Games)
- Eilene Hannan, renowned international operatic soprano (sang in the inaugural production at the Sydney Opera House)
- Lesbia Harford, poet, novelist, political activist
- Libby Lyons, director, Workplace Gender Equality Agency
- Cathy McGowan, politician (independent federal member for Indi 2013–19)
- Pia Miranda, actress (Looking for Alibrandi)
- Anabelle Smith, diver (Bronze medalist at the 2010 Commonwealth Games, qualified for the 2012 Olympic Games and Bronze medallist at the 2016 Olympic Games)
- Chrissie Swan, Big Brother Australia contestant, writer, contestant on I'm a Celebrity AU and currently radio presenter on Nova 100
- Marie Tehan, Victorian state politician and Minister
- Jane Turner, actress (Fast Forward, Kath & Kim)
- Jo Weston, Netballer

== Fellow Sacred Heart schools in Australia and New Zealand ==
- Kincoppal-Rose Bay, Sydney
- Stuartholme School, Brisbane
- Baradene College, Auckland, New Zealand

== See also ==
- List of schools in Victoria, Australia
- Victorian Certificate of Education
- List of Schools of the Sacred Heart
