= Ted Emery =

Australian director and producer (1946 or 1947–2026)

Ted Emery (1947 – 3 March 2026) was an Australian film and television director and producer.

== Life and career ==
Emery served in the Royal Australian Navy during the Vietnam War. After returning to Australia, he joined the Australian Broadcasting Corporation (ABC) in Melbourne. He became a director and producer for Countdown, the ABC's weekly television music program.

He continued to work as an assistant director at the ABC on such programs as Power Without Glory, before moving into directing comedy series. He worked consistently as a director, writer and producer of a number of Australian comedy television series and films, including Fast Forward, Full Frontal and Kath & Kim.

Emery was featured in the Molly Meldrum biopic television series, Molly, where his work as a director on Countdown was dramatised. He is credited with having helped to save many of the master videotapes of Countdown, including the first episode broadcast in colour. A large number of master videotapes recorded at the ABC between 1974 and 1978 were later erased and recycled during a management-initiated "economy drive" at the ABC, an action which Meldrum later criticised and said was "unforgivable".

Emery moved to Queensland in 2008 and retired from television work by 2015. He died from cancer in Noosa on 3 March 2026.

== Credits ==
Year	Title	Role
1974	Countdown	Producer/Director
1976	Power Without Glory	First Assistant Director
1982	The Simon Gallaher Show	Director, producer
1986	While You're Down There	Director, producer
1986	Acropolis Now	Director
1990	Tonight Live with Steve Vizard	Director
1991	Turn It Up	Director, producer
1992	Bligh	Director, executive Producer
1989–1992	Fast Forward	Writer, executive Producer
1994	Jimeoin	Director
1996	The Eric Bana Show Live	Executive Producer
1993–1997	Full Frontal	Writer, executive Producer
1996	Shark Bay	Director
1998–2001	Micallef Program	Director
1999	The Craic	Director
2000	One Size Fits All	Executive Producer
2002–2007	Kath and Kim	Director
2003	Welcher and Welcher	Director
2003	The Honourable Wally Norman	Director
2004–2005	Dancing With The Stars	Director
2007	Wendy Harmer's Stuff	Director
2008	Whatever Happened To That Guy	Director
2010–2011	Bed of Roses	Director
2012	Kath and Kimderella	Director
