= Something Stupid (TV series) =

Australian sketch comedy series

Something Stupid was a short-lived Australian sketch comedy series which aired in 1998 on the Seven Network. The program was produced, written and performed by much the same team that was behind the Fast Forward series. The series had the working title The Lazy Susan Show.

== Sketches ==
The characters of Kath, Kim, Sharon, Kel (then known as Nev,) Prue and Trude from the popular sitcom Kath & Kim appeared in regular sketches on the program. They had all originally appeared on Riley and Turner's previous project, Big Girl's Blouse, along with an early incarnation of Brett. These sketches also included characters that would later be dropped from the Kath & Kim lineup, including Kath's mother (portrayed by Szubanski, who had previously appeared in a Fast Forward sketch,) and Pip, a third retail assistant that worked with Prue and Trude (portrayed by Downey.)

Other sketches included:

- Crack O'Dawn (a parody of breakfast news shows) hosted by Dawn De Ponme (Downey)
- Annie Get Your AK-47 (a parody of Annie Get Your Gun)
- Supermodel Cafe
- The Golden Boot Awards
- The Poonce Institute (a medical drama)
- a parody of Two Fat Ladies
- Rei-Jing (a Chinese variety show) hosted by Chu Yang Phat (Szubanski)
- A parody of the song "Frozen" by Madonna (played by Riley)
- a Ruby Wax impersonation by Riley
- The Global World News
- Professor Janine O'Dowd and her Wonderful World of Ethnic Dance (Played by Szubanski)
- Runaway, Hosted by Flicka Dickie (played by Riley)
- Father Tom Stopit (played by Robbins)
- IntoView
- a Parody of ER
- The Potato Players of Burwood
- Positive Parenting.

Other more generic comedy sketches were also included.

== Cast ==
- Marg Downey
- Gina Riley
- Magda Szubanski
- Jane Turner
- Glenn Robbins
- Mark Neal
- Kevin Shecox
