= Magda Szubanski =

Australian actor and comedian (born 1961)

Magda Szubanski AO
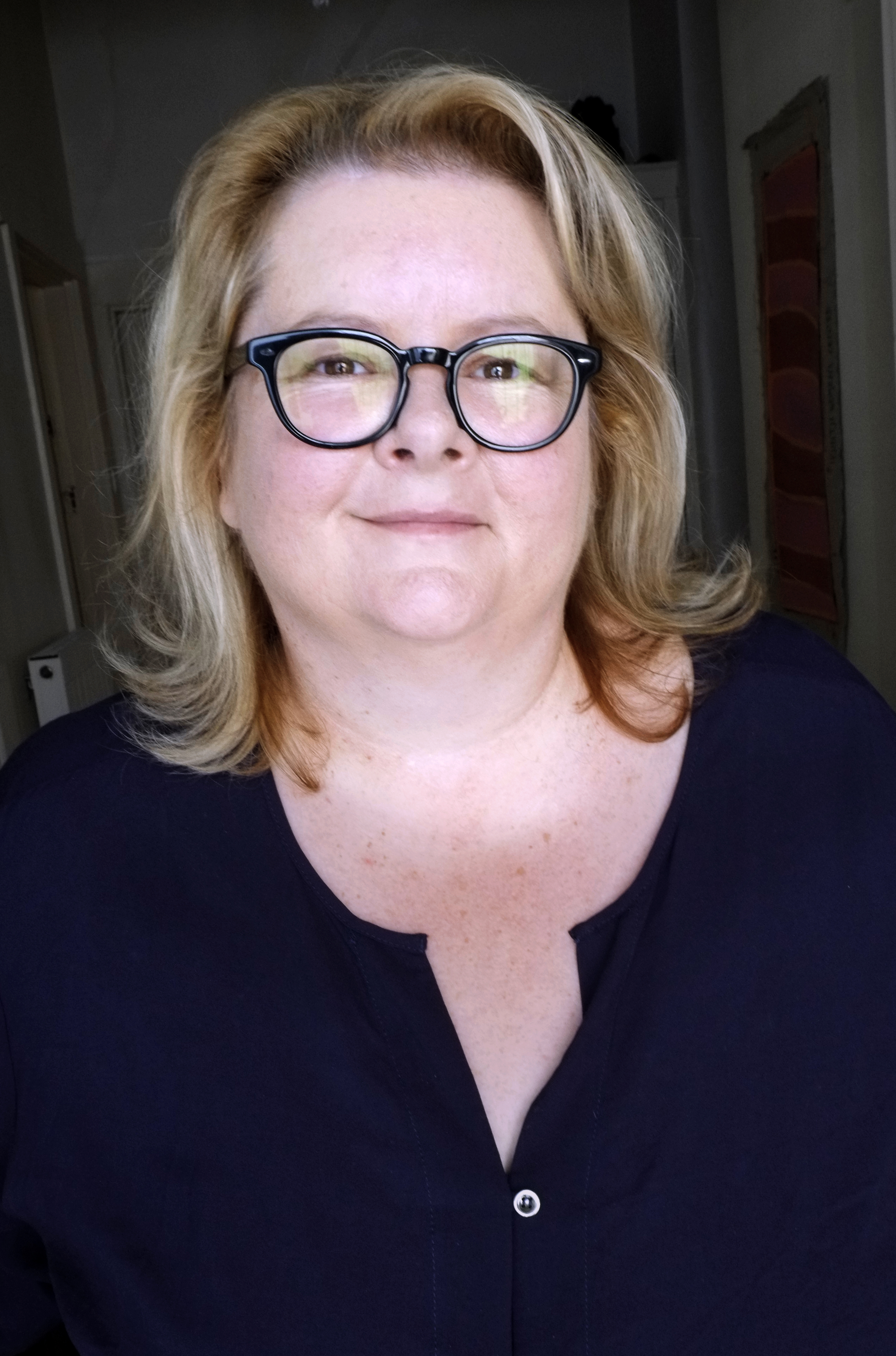
- Szubanski in 2015
- Born: Magdalene Mary Therese Szubanski; 12 April 1961 (age 65); Liverpool, England
- Education: Siena College
- Alma mater: University of Melbourne
- Occupations: Actor; author; comedian; LGBT rights advocate
- Years active: 1986–present
- Notable work: Esme Cordelia Hoggett in Babe (1995) and its 1998 sequel Voice of Miss Viola in Happy Feet (2006) and its 2011 sequel Voice of Mrs. Mutton in 100% Wolf (2020)
- Television: Fast Forward (1989–1992); Kath and Kim (2002–2007)

Magdalene Mary Therese Szubanski AO (/ʒəˈbænski/ zhə-BAN-skee; born 12 April 1961) is an Australian comedian, actor, author and LGBT rights advocate. She performed in Fast Forward, Kath & Kim as Sharon Strzelecki, and in the films Babe (1995) and Babe: Pig in the City (1998), Happy Feet (2006) and Happy Feet Two (2011). In 2003 and 2004 surveys, she polled as the most recognised and well-liked Australian television personality.

Szubanski has spoken openly about her struggles with intergenerational trauma, anxiety and suicidal ideation in her teens. She became an activist for LGBT rights and, in 2017, advocated for same-sex marriage in Australia. In 2015, Szubanski released her memoir, Reckoning.

== Early life and education ==
Szubanski was born on 12 April 1961 in Liverpool, England, and moved to Melbourne, Australia when she was four. Her mother Margaret (née McCarthy) is Scottish-Irish and came from a poor family. Her father, Zbigniew Szubański, came from a well-off Polish family and was an assassin in a counter-intelligence branch of the Polish resistance movement in World War II. She is a cousin of Polish actor Magdalena Zawadzka.

Szubanski attended Siena College, Melbourne. In 1976, as a Year 10 student, she captained a team on the television quiz show It's Academic. Szubanski studied fine arts and philosophy at the University of Melbourne where she attained a Bachelor of Arts.

== Career ==
=== Television ===
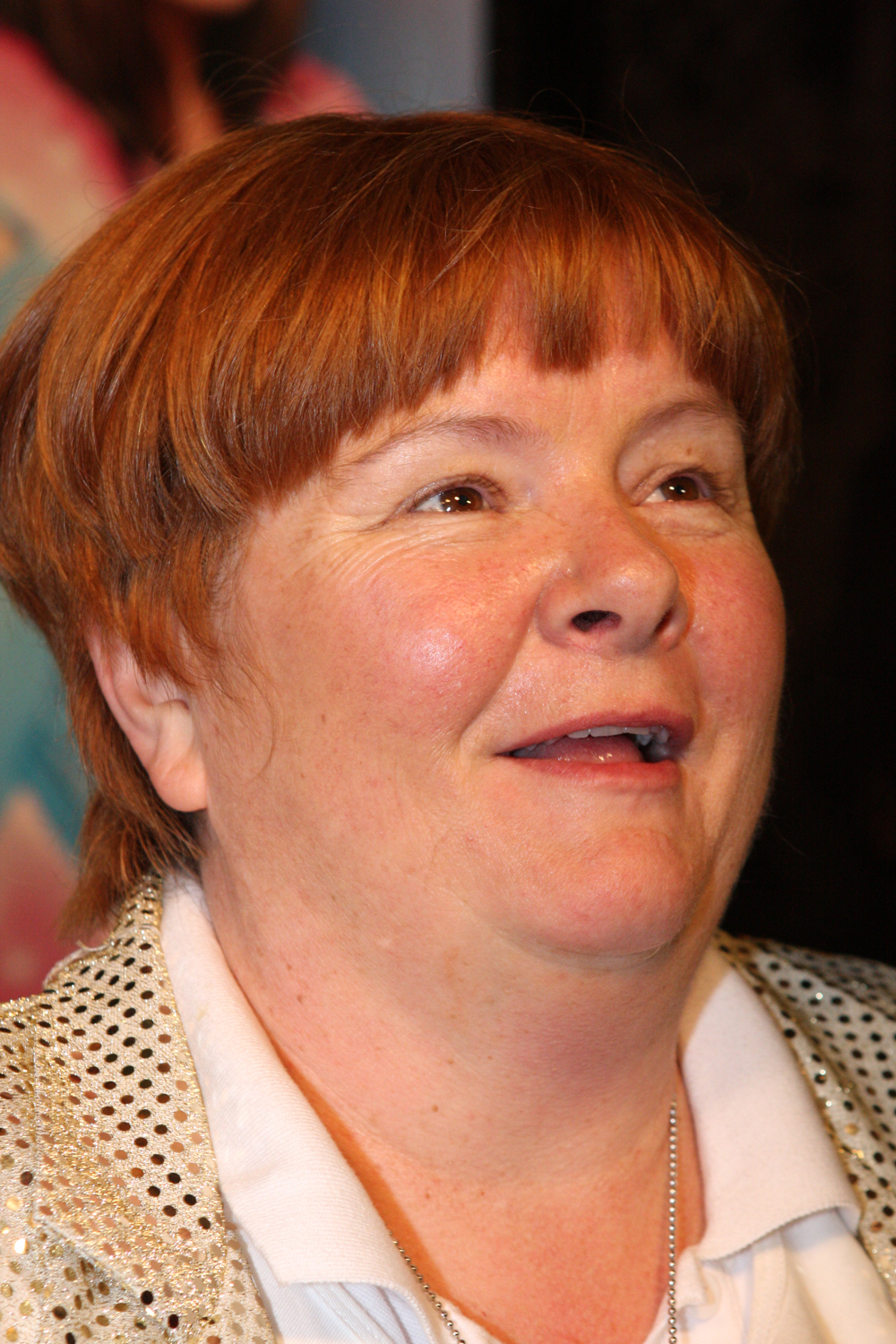
Szubanski in character at the Kath & Kimderella film premiere, August 2012

Szubanski was a writer and performer of sketch comedy. In 1985, while performing in a University of Melbourne revue of Too Cool for Sandals, Szubanski, Michael Veitch, Tom Gleisner and others were talent-spotted by Australian Broadcasting Corporation (ABC) producers, which led to The D-Generation television sketch comedy show.

Szubanski was one of the creators and performers of the Fast Forward television sketch comedy for the Seven Network, in which she played various characters, including Pixie-Anne Wheatley, Chenille from the Institute de Beauté, Wee Mary MacGregor, Joan Kirner and Michelle Grogan. The character of Lynne Postlethwaite was first performed on the ABC's The D-Generation. It was originally written by John Allsop and Andrew Knight, but from Fast Forward onwards Szubanski co-wrote the sketches, and created and co-wrote her characters.

In 1995, she and friends Gina Riley and Jane Turner wrote, performed and produced the first all-female Australian sketch comedy television program; Big Girl's Blouse. When Riley and Turner developed sketch characters they had created into the sitcom Kath & Kim, Szubanski joined them to play Sharon Strzelecki, a character she had previously developed. That same year, Szubanski hosted the 37th Australian Film Institute Awards.

In 1999, Szubanski created, wrote, co-produced and played Margaret O'Halloran in the Dogwoman series of TV films, a detective-style show based on the idea of an expert "dog-whisperer" who, by treating problem dogs, inadvertently stumbles upon and solves human crimes.

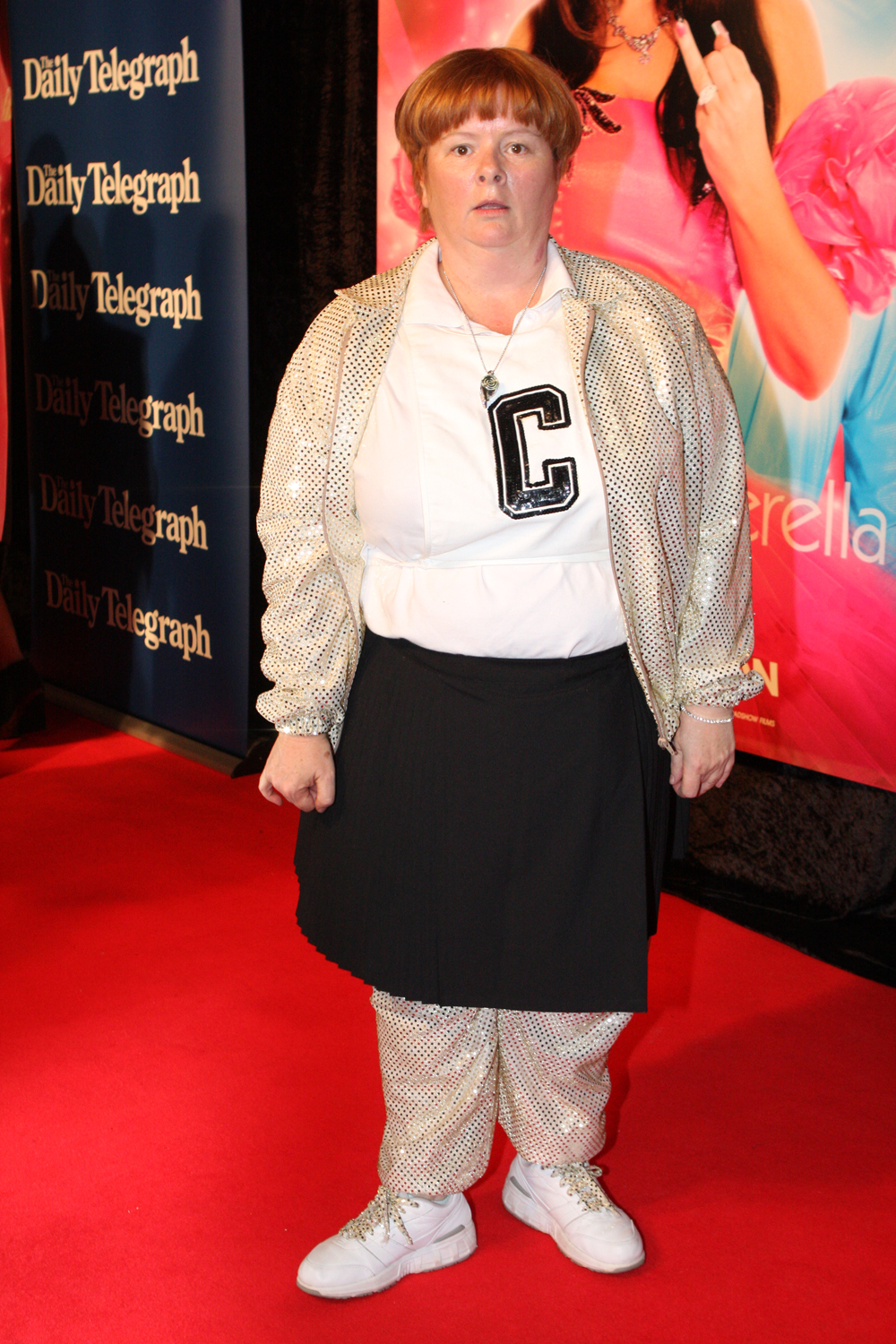
Sharon Strzelecki is one of Szubanski's most developed characters

In 2009 she appeared on Who Do You Think You Are?, where she explored her father's Polish Resistance activities as well as the story of her shell-shocked Irish grandfather and her sculptor ancestor Luigi Isepponi who assisted in making the death mask for William Burke, half of the duo Burke and Hare, notorious grave robbers and serial killers.

From 3 September 2018, Szubanski recurred as Jemima Davies-Smythe on Neighbours. Her character officiated the first same-sex wedding on Australian television.

On 8 April 2019, she appeared as "Guest Announcer" on Chris & Julia's Sunday Night Takeaway's season finale where she played a number of roles.

On 9 March 2021, Szubanski was announced as the host of the Nine Network's revival of The Weakest Link. Initially due to premiere on 4 May 2021, it instead premiered on 25 May following a tight production schedule.

=== Film ===
Szubanski performed in the 1995 film Babe as Esme Hoggett. She reprised her role in the 1998 sequel, Babe: Pig in the City. She then teamed up again with director/producer George Miller to voice the role of Miss Viola in the animated films Happy Feet and Happy Feet Two.

In 2007, she had a minor role as Mrs Lonsdale, the housemaid in The Golden Compass to Lyra Belacqua.

=== Musical theatre ===
In 2007, Szubanski ventured into musical comedy, taking on the role of William Barfee in the Melbourne Theatre Company production of the hit Broadway musical The 25th Annual Putnam County Spelling Bee. Variety described her performance as "sensationally good". Australian Stage said, "Magda Szubanski as the Eric Cartman-esque William Barfee steals the show."

In 2008, she again participated in some gender-blind casting, taking on the role of pint-sized gangster Big Jule in a major stage production of Guys and Dolls.

In 2010, she appeared in the first Indigenous musical film Bran Nue Dae as Roadhouse Betty, alongside Geoffrey Rush, Ernie Dingo, Missy Higgins and Deborah Mailman. The film was directed by Rachel Perkins, daughter of the Aboriginal activist Charlie Perkins.

In 2012, she again teamed with Rush to appear in the Stephen Sondheim musical A Funny Thing Happened on the Way to the Forum.

=== Art ===
In 2020, Szubanski was the painted subject of Wendy Sharpe's Archibald Prize entry, a portrait painting competition held by the Art Gallery of New South Wales. In Sharpe's painting, Comedy and Tragedy, Szubanski is depicted as Sharon Strzelecki, standing amongst flaming buildings during an air raid.

The painting achieved finalist status in the competition; and in an interview with AGNSW, Sharpe commented:

'After an intense conversation with Magda in my Sydney studio, I decided to change my original concept for the portrait and painted her as a despairing version of her comic character/alter ego Sharon. Magda is haunted by her father's traumatic experiences in World War II in the Polish resistance, and by current world events.'

=== Other projects ===
In 2004, Szubanski advertised the airline Jetstar. Szubanski became a spokesperson for the dieting company Jenny Craig in November 2008. Szubanski joined Jenny Craig weighing 110 kg and had been diagnosed with sleep apnoea. By July 2009, she had lost 36 kg to weigh 85 kg. She later regained weight, then was dropped as a spokesperson for Jenny Craig. However, subsequent weight loss led to her being re-signed as their spokesperson. She was later again dropped from Jenny Craig. She was also featured in commercials for Telstra in 2014. In 2019, she appeared in an Uber Eats ad in her Sharon Strzelecki character with a "Kim", referencing fellow Kath & Kim character Kim Craig, but who turns out to be Kim Kardashian.

=== Memoir ===
In 2015, Szubanski released a memoir, Reckoning, in large part about her father, Zbigniew Szubanski, who was a World War 2 Polish Resistance assassin, and dealing with themes of intergenerational trauma, possible genetic inheritance of traumatic memory and Szubanski's struggles with her own sexuality. The book won the TBA and $40,000 Douglas Stewart Prize for Non fiction, as well as "Book of the Year" and "Biography of the Year" at the Australian Book Industry Awards. Reviewer Peter Craven, in The Australian, said it would "dazzle every kind of reader" and described it as "a riveting, overwhelmingly poignant autobiography by a woman of genius. It is a book about how someone might live with the idea of killing the thing they love. It is a story of love and death and redemption and a daughter's love for her father. It is an extraordinary hymn to the tragic heroism at the heart of ordinary life and the soaring moral scrutiny of womankind. Every library should have it, every school should teach it." Richard Ferguson in The Sydney Morning Herald wrote, "This is documentary writing of the highest order and Szubanski has given life to an incredible war story ... Reckoning, this tale of war and suburbia, sexuality and comedy" and referred to Szubanski as an A-grade non-fiction writer.

Actor and friend Geoffrey Rush launched her book and wrote in The Guardian: "I was absorbed in preparing for King Lear when I read the book. The classical stature of that particular father-daughter relationship didn't go unnoticed. Magda grew up in the shadow of a difficult reckoning — the summation, the questioning, the Elizabethan sense of settling the bill with one's parents. As she phrases it: her father needed to forget— she needed to remember. The only way forward was back. Her book riffs a major life in a reflective minor key. I've got lost in Joyce's Dublin, Woolf's Bloomsbury, the Bronte Sisters' Yorkshire moors. Now I'm enthralled with Magda Szubanski's Croydon, Australia's own collective sub-conscious suburb, the architecture of which she deftly anoints as Bauhaus's "bastard child"... Reckoning is really a non-fiction novel – and its invitation into Magda's story is infectious." The New South Wales Premier's Award judges described Reckoning as 'warm, clear, wise, funny and deeply intelligent. The amplitude of Szubanski's writing is particularly impressive. Her voice has a light surety, while constantly giving narrative and moral weight to the larger themes of grief, family, migration and finding one's place in the world."

Szubanski released a follow-up memoir, I Can't Tell You But I Will, in September 2026. The book chronicles her complicated relationship with—and the demise of—her mother, as well as her cancer diagnosis and recovery.

=== Children's literature ===
Szubanski is the author of "Timmy the Ticked Off Pony", a series of children's books illustrated by Dean Rankine.

=== Recognition ===
In 2019, Szubanski was appointed an officer in the general division of the Order of Australia (AO) "for distinguished service to the performing arts as an actor, comedian and writer, and as a campaigner for marriage equality."

In 2025, she was inducted into the Logie Hall of Fame, for her contribution to comedy, literature and activism. She is the fifth female inductee to enter into the Logie Hall of Fame.

== LGBT rights activism ==
Szubanski has been a vocal campaigner for LGBT rights and for same-sex marriage since coming out publicly in 2012. She is patron of the LGBT group, Twenty/10.

During the same-sex Australian Marriage Law Postal Survey, Szubanski was interviewed on several TV shows advocating for a "Yes" result. The co-chair of Australian Marriage Equality (Alex Greenwich) rated her efforts as "crucial" in the success of the "Yes" campaign.

== Charity ==
In 2020, Szubanski and Will "Egg Boy" Connolly raised $190,000 for bushfire-affected communities, and together with trauma experts co-founded "Regeneration", a creative arts project to provide mental health support.

In 2013, Szubanski became the Patron of "Twenty10".

== Controversies ==
In the 1990s Szubanski did blackface for a television show which aired on the Seven Network. She has since acknowledged this was a mistake. “We didn’t know, and that doesn’t mean you’re off the hook”.

In 2019 Szubanski was involved in a campaign targeting Christian preacher and rugby league football player Israel Folau after he called on homosexuals to "repent of their sins and turn to God". Szubanski prominently launched an appeal to fund opposition to Folau. After Szubanski was criticised, Folau called for an end to online attacks on Szubanski.

In 2020 the Commissioner for eSafety, Julie Inman Grant, told Senate Estimates that Szubanski had been the target of "volumetric...coordinated right-wing extremist attacks" after she appeared in a COVID safety ad.

In April 2021 Szubanski faced criticism and calls for her to hand back the award which had appointed her officer in the Order of Australia after she criticised the appearance of Jenny Morrison, wife of the then Australian Prime Minister, Scott Morrison. Commenting on the Morrisons in a photograph of the Prime Minister signing a condolence book after the death of Prince Philip, Szubanski compared the Prime Minister's wife's appearance to a character in a fictional religious extremist society of sex slaves from the series The Handmaid's Tale.

== Personal life ==
On 14 February 2012, Szubanski came out in a statement supporting same-sex marriage and stated that she "absolutely identifies as gay" in an interview on Australian TV current affairs program The Project.

Szubanski has described herself as "culturally Catholic".

In May 2025, Szubanski announced that she had been diagnosed with mantle cell lymphoma, a rare form of cancer, and that it had progressed to stage 4.

== Filmography ==
=== Film ===
Year	Title	Role	Notes
1995	Babe	Esme Cordelia Hoggett	
1998	Babe: Pig in the City	Esme Cordelia Hoggett	
2002	The Crocodile Hunter: Collision Course	Brozzie Drewitt	
2005	Son of the Mask	Neighbour Betty	
2006	Happy Feet	Miss Viola	Voice
2007	Dr Plonk	Mrs. Plonk	
2007	Goodnight, Vagina	Mrs. March	Short
2007	Little Deaths	Iris	
2007	The Golden Compass	Mrs. Lonsdale	
2010	Bran Nue Dae	Roadhouse Betty	
2010	Santa's Apprentice	Beatrice	Voice
2011	Happy Feet Two	Miss Viola	Voice
2012	Kath & Kimderella	Sharon Karen Strzelecki	
2013	Goddess	Cassandra Wolfe	
2017	Three Summers	Queenie	
2018	The BBQ	The Butcher	
2019	Ride Like a Girl	Sister Dominique	
2020	100% Wolf	Mrs. Mutton	Voice
2024	Memoir of a Snail	Ruth	Voice

=== Television ===
Year	Title	Role	Notes
1986–1987	The D-Generation	Various characters	
1988	The D-Generation Goes Commercial	Various characters	
1989–1992	Fast Forward	Pixie-Anne Wheatley, Chenille, Joan Kirner, Mary McGregor, Maggie T & Satan's Brides	
1992	Bligh	Betsy Bligh	
1993	Full Frontal	Various characters	
1993	The Making of Nothing	Judith Gates/Kim Borrodale	
1993	A Royal Commission into the Australian Economy	Mr Cardigan, Mr Trouser, Bill Kelty	
1994	Big Girl's Blouse	Herself, Sharon Karen Strzelecki, Lynne Postlethwaite	
1995	The Search for Christmas	Herself	
1996	The Genie from Down Under	Doris	
1997	Good Guys, Bad Guys	Bella Bouvier	
1998	Something Stupid	Various characters	
1999–2001	Farscape	Furlow	
2000–2001	Dogwoman	Margaret O'Halloran	
2002–2007	Kath & Kim	Sharon Karen Strzelecki, Lorraine Craig	
2006	Magda's Funny Bits	Mary McGregor, Chenille, Sharon Karen Strzelecki, Lynne Postlethwaite	
2009	The Spearman Experiment	Host	
2010	Who Do You Think You Are?	Herself	
2014	Rake	Helen	
2014	Legit	Anne Jefferies	
2014	It's a Date	Mary-Angela	
2015	Open Slather	Various characters	
2015	Stop Laughing... This Is Serious	Herself	
2016	Anh's Brush with Fame	Herself	Series 1 Episode 1
2016	Q&A	Herself	(19 September 2016)
2017	Q&A	Herself	23 October
2018	Neighbours	Jemima Davies-Smythe	11 episodes
2019	Chris & Julia's Sunday Night Takeaway	Herself: Guest Announcer	Season Finale: 14 April
2019	My Life Is Murder	Miranda Lee	Episode: "Old School"; Series 1 Episode 7
2021–2022	Weakest Link (Australia)	Herself	
2022	After the Verdict	Margie	
2022	God's Favorite Idiot	Bathroom God	
2022	Magda's Big National Health Check	Herself	Documentary

=== Stage ===
Year	Title	Role	Notes
1985	Too Cool for Sandals	various	
1993	The Rise and Fall of Little Voice	Sadie	
2005	Grease: The Arena Spectacular (National Australia Tour)	Miss Lynch	
2007	The Madwoman of Chaillot	Countess Aurelia	
2008	Guys and Dolls	Big Jule	
2012	A Funny Thing Happened on the Way to the Forum	Domina	

== Awards ==
Acting

- Won the 'Most Popular Comedy Personality' award at the 1991, 1992 and 1996 Logie awards
- Won the Australian Film Institute's award 'Best Actress in a Supporting or Guest Role in a Television Drama' award in 2002
- Nominated 'Best Family Actress' OFTA Film Awards 1999
- Nominated for the 'Most Popular Actress' award at the 2005 Logie Awards, for her role in Kath & Kim
- Nominated for 'Best Actress in a Supporting or Guest Role in a Television Drama or Comedy' award in 2003 at the AFI Awards
- Nominated for 'Best Actress in a Supporting or Guest Role in a Television Drama or Comedy' award in 2004 at the AFI Awards
- Nominated for 'Best Female actor in a Musical' at the 2006 Helpmann Awards for her role in The 25th Annual Putnam County Spelling Bee
- Nominated for 'Female Actor in a Featured Role' at the 2006 Green Room Awards for her role in The 25th Annual Putnam County Spelling Bee
- Nominated Silver Logie 'Most Popular Actress' in Kath & Kim 2008
- Nominated for 'Best Actress Supporting Role' Film Critics Circle of Australia Awards 2014 for Goddess

Writing

- Winner – Awgie Award for sketch comedy Big Girl's Blouse
- Winner – Awgie Award Fast Forward Writing team best Comedy/Revue/Sketch, 1990, 1991
- Winner, Nielsen BookData Booksellers Choice Award, 2016 award
- Winner, Book of the Year, Australian Book Industry Awards, 2016 award
- Winner, Biography of the Year, Australian Book Industry Awards, 2016 award
- Winner, Douglas Stewart Prize for Non-Fiction, NSW Premier's Literary Awards, 2016 award
- Winner, Indie Award for Non-Fiction, 2016 award
- Winner, Victorian Community History Award Judges' Special Prize, 2016 award
- Shortlisted, Matt Richell Award for New Writer of the Year, Australian Book Industry Awards, 2016 award
- Shortlisted, Dobbie Literary Award, 2016 award
- Shortlisted, National Biography Award, 2016

Other

- Winner, Liberty Voltaire Award for Free Speech, 2018
- Winner, Excellence in Women's Leadership Victoria, 2018
- Officer of the Order of Australia (AO), 2019
- Nominated, Victorian Australian of the year, 2017
- Australia Post, Australian Legends of Comedy stamp series, 2020
