= Vigil (musical) =

- Promotional image for 2017 Melbourne season
- Music: Joe Chindamo
- Lyrics: Steve Vizard
- Book: Steve Vizard
- Premiere: 10 June 2017: Space Theatre, Adelaide Festival Centre
- Productions: 2017 Adelaide/Melbourne

Vigil is a one-woman Australian musical with book and lyrics by Steve Vizard and music by Joe Chindamo.

== Synopsis ==
An exploration of mother-daughter relationships with comedy and drama, the musical concerns Liz, a prodigal daughter who returns to her mother's hospital ward on Christmas Eve after a long time overseas. Commissioned by the Adelaide Cabaret Festival, Vigil was inspired by a family gathering around Vizard's recently deceased mother.

== Productions ==
The original production featured Christie Whelan Browne and was directed by Andy Packer. It premiered at the Space Theatre, Adelaide Festival Centre for the Adelaide Cabaret Festival in June 2017, followed by a short Melbourne season at the Fairfax Studio, Arts Centre Melbourne in July 2017.

== Reception ==
Vigil has been highly acclaimed. The Age described it as "a captivating new musical" and concluded that "with brilliant composition, writing, acting and vocals, with direction and design that augment intimacy at every point, the show makes you want to laugh and weep, sometimes both at once." The Herald Sun, in a four and a half star review, said that "Vigil soars in the most spirited, life affirming way." The Adelaide Advertiser called it "a dynamic, moving, frequently funny and catchy melody-packed showcase [for Whelan Browne]". Limelight Magazine said Vigil is "a rollicking, dark and affecting show, which is well conceived, craftily drawn and superbly executed."

At the Melbourne Green Room Awards in 2018, Vigil was nominated in the Music Theatre section for Production, Direction, Music Direction/Supervision and Lighting Design, with Whelan Browne winning as Female Lead.
