= Patricia Barraclough =

Australian television producer

Patricia Mary Barraclough (5 September 1951 – 21 November 2023) was an Australian television producer.

== Biography ==
Born on 5 September 1951, in Surrey, England, to parents Edward and Mary Barraclough (née Dennis), she moved to Australia with her family in the 1950s. She completed her education at Sacré Cœur School in Glen Iris.

Barraclough became engaged in the social movements of the late 1960s and early 1970s, including the Vietnam Moratorium movement, and associated with radical figures of the time.

In 1974, she married Warwick Konopacki and started her career at ABC Television's Sydney headquarters. During her career, she worked as an executive producer of radio in Brisbane and as a producer on the program Lateline.

Barraclough was instrumental in launching Australian Story and the ACT edition of Stateline. Her work often focused on community issues, such as the Mr Fluffy asbestos crisis in Canberra.

In her later years, Barraclough lived in Murrumbateman, engaging in photography and wildlife conservation. She was diagnosed with lung cancer in 2022 and died on 21 November 2023.
