= Jane Turner =

Australian comedian (born 1960)

Jane Turner OAM
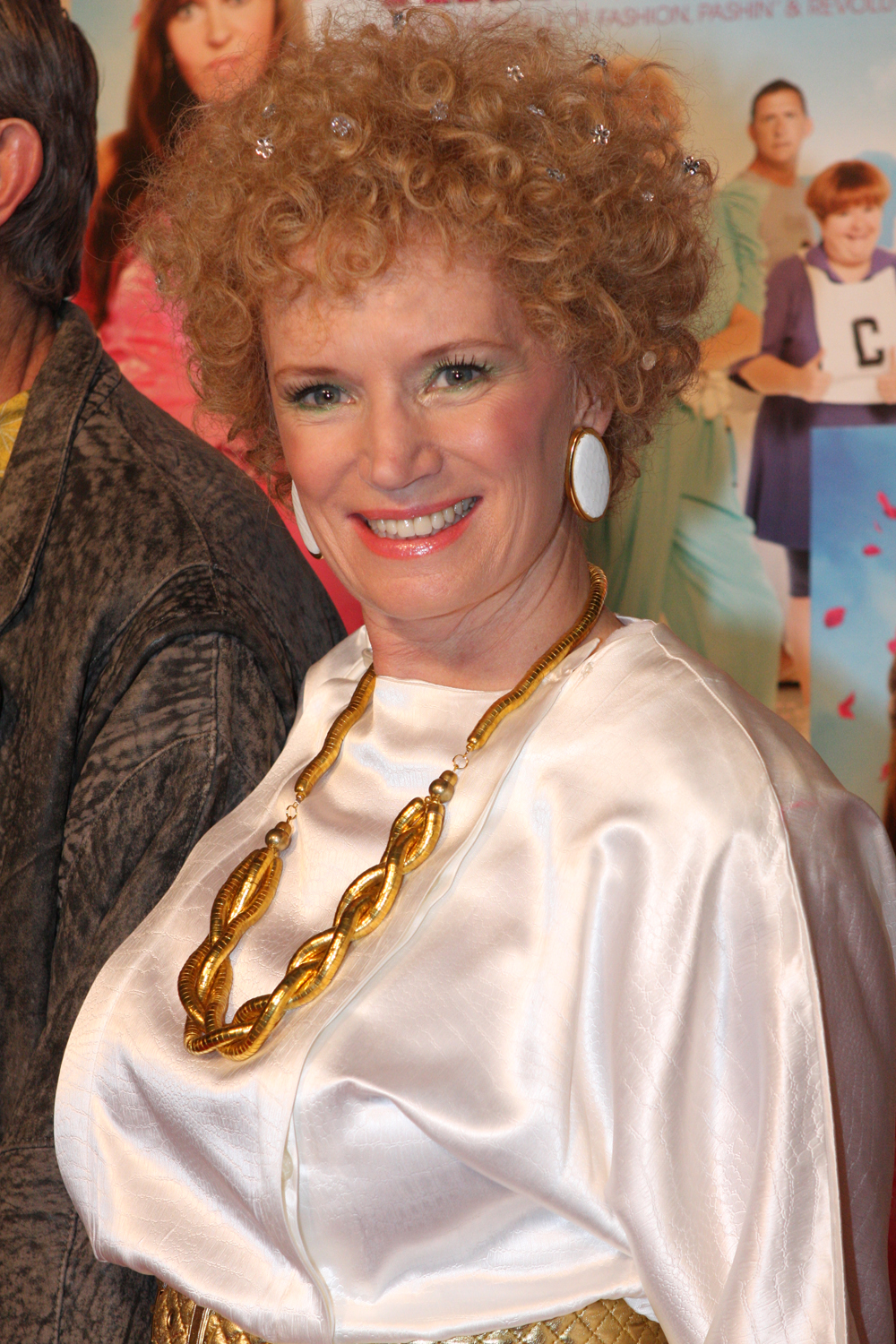
- Turner in character as Kath Day-Knight at the Kath & Kimderella movie premiere, in August 2012
- Born: 1 December 1960 (age 65); Newcastle, New South Wales, Australia
- Education: Sacré Cœur School, Monash University/
- Occupations: Actress; producer; comedienne; writer
- Known for: Kath and Kim
- Spouse: John Denton
- Children: 3, including Nicholas Denton

Jane Turner OAM (born 1 December 1960) is an Australian actress, comedian and Logie Award–winning comedy series creator and screenwriter. She is widely known for her role as Kath in the TV sitcom Kath and Kim.

== Career ==
Jane Turner, although best known as a comedy performer, made her acting debut in the internationally renowned TV cult drama series Prisoner in a 15-episode guest role.

She is notable for numerous comedy roles including the sketch comedy programs The D-Generation, Fast Forward, Full Frontal, Big Girl's Blouse and Something Stupid.

In the 2000s Turner has received accolades for her performance in Kath & Kim, an ABC Television (later Seven Network) comedy series which she created, wrote, produced, and starred in, with her longtime friend and collaborator, Gina Riley. Kath & Kim became the most successful ABC syndicated show in Australia.

Turner reprised the role in the 2005 telemovie Da Kath & Kim Code and the 2012 feature film Kath & Kimderella.

Turner made her West End theatrical debut in the Australian hit play Holding the Man at London's Trafalgar Studios in April 2010.

In 2022, Turner and the cast of Kath and Kim produced a special that released on channel 7. The special included interviews, new skits and behind the scenes insights to the famous TV show.

== Personal life ==
Turner attended Sacré Cœur School in Glen Iris, Victoria, and later studied law at Monash University. Turner graduated from Monash with a Bachelor of Arts degree in 1988.

She is married to lawyer John Denton, and they have three children, including model Anna Denton and actor Nicholas Denton.

== Filmography ==
Television
Year	Title	Role	Notes
1983–84	Prisoner	Belinda Johns	Seasons 5−6 (recurring; 15 episodes)
1987	The D-Generation	Various characters	Season 2 & Seven Network specials (8 episodes) + Writer (7 episodes)
1989–92	Fast Forward	Various characters	Seasons 1–4 (lead; 90 episodes) + Writer (90 episodes)
1992	Bligh	Mad Lottie	Season 1 (guest; 1 episode)
1993	Full Frontal	Various characters	Season 1 (guest; 13 episodes)
1993	The Making of Nothing	Pasha	Television special
1993	A Royal Commission Into the Australian Economy	Court Official / Travel Agent	Television special
1994	Big Girl's Blouse	Various characters	Season 1 (main; 9 episodes) + Writer & producer (9 episodes)
1998	Something Stupid	Various characters	Season 1 (main; 6 episodes) + Writer & producer (6 episodes)
2002–07	Kath & Kim	Kath Day-Knight / Prue	Seasons 1−4 & special (33 episodes) + Writer & executive producer (32 episodes); producer (25 episodes)
2007	Little Britain Down Under	Kath Day-Knight	Television documentary
2015	Open Slather	Various characters	Season 1 (main; 11 episodes)
2018	Rake	Senator Penny Evans	Season 5 (recurring; 5 episodes)
2020	Parlement (French TV series)	MEP Sharon Redlion	Season 1 (recurring; 10 episodes)

Film
Year	Title	Role	Notes
1987	Bachelor Girl	Vicki	Television film
1987	The Bit Part	Actress in Play	Feature film
1997	Thank God He Met Lizzie	Anne	Feature film
2002	Guru Wayne	Sarg	Feature film
2005	Da Kath & Kim Code	Kath Day-Knight / Prue	Television film (+ writer & producer)
2012	Kath & Kimderella	Kath Day-Knight / Prue	Feature film
