= Big Girl's Blouse =

- Genre: Sketch comedy
- Written by: Magda Szubanski; Jane Turner; Gina Riley
- Starring: Magda Szubanski; Jane Turner; Gina Riley
- Country of origin: Australia
- Original language: English
- No. of seasons: 1
- No. of episodes: 9

Production
- Production locations: Melbourne, Victoria, Australia
- Production company: Artist Services

Original release
- Network: Seven Network
- Release: 13 October 1994 – 8 September 1995

Big Girl's Blouse is an Australian sketch comedy program that was produced by Steve Vizard and Andrew Knight's Artist Services and broadcast in 1994-5 on the Seven Network. It was written and performed by Gina Riley, Jane Turner and Magda Szubanski. Early versions of the trio's Kath & Kim characters, Kath, Kim and Sharon, appeared for the first time in the show, in several sketches based around Kim's wedding.

The phrase "Big Girl's Blouse" is a British English idiom meaning "ineffectual or weak, someone failing to show masculine strength or determination." Originally titled Fast Women, Big Girl's Blouse was the second of three sketch shows featuring Riley, Turner and Szubanski, following Fast Forward and followed by Something Stupid.

The show began as a one-hour special, screened in October 1994. Critics lauded it (Ross Warneke in the Melbourne Age described it as 'crackerjack entertainment - pacy, fresh and wickedly funny'). Its commercial success inspired the Seven Network to commission a series, announced in January 1995. While the series was, like the original special, a critical success it was taken off air in April 1995 after three episodes had been screened as it was rating poorly against the drama ER. In May, it was announced that the show had been shortlisted for a comedy award at the Rose d'Or in Montreaux. The remaining episodes were shown packaged as one-hour programs.

== Reruns ==
In Australia, the show periodically aired on The Comedy Channel. In the USA it occasionally appears on Sundance TV. Many of the sketches are still available on YouTube.

== DVD release ==
The show was released in its entirety by Shock DVD in Australia on 17 October 2003.
