= Bligh (TV series) =

- Directed by: Mandy Smith; Ted Emery; Kendal Flanagan
- Starring: Michael Veitch; William McInnes; Magda Szubanski; Gina Riley
- Composer: Steve Blackburn
- Country of origin: Australia
- Original language: English
- No. of episodes: 13

Production
- Producers: Steve Vizard; Andrew Knight

Original release
- Network: Seven Network
- Release: 1992

Bligh is a 1992 Australian sitcom, set in colonial New South Wales, in 1807 and based on the life of Sir William Bligh, as Colonial Governor.

== Cast ==
- Michael Veitch as Governor William Bligh
- Magda Szubanski as Betsy Bligh
- William McInnes as John Macarthur
- Gina Riley as Elizabeth Macarthur
- Peter Moon as Reverend Marsden / King George III
- Jimeoin as Convict Griffin
- Kym Gyngell as The Prince
