= Gina Riley =

Australian actress, singer and comedian (born 1961)

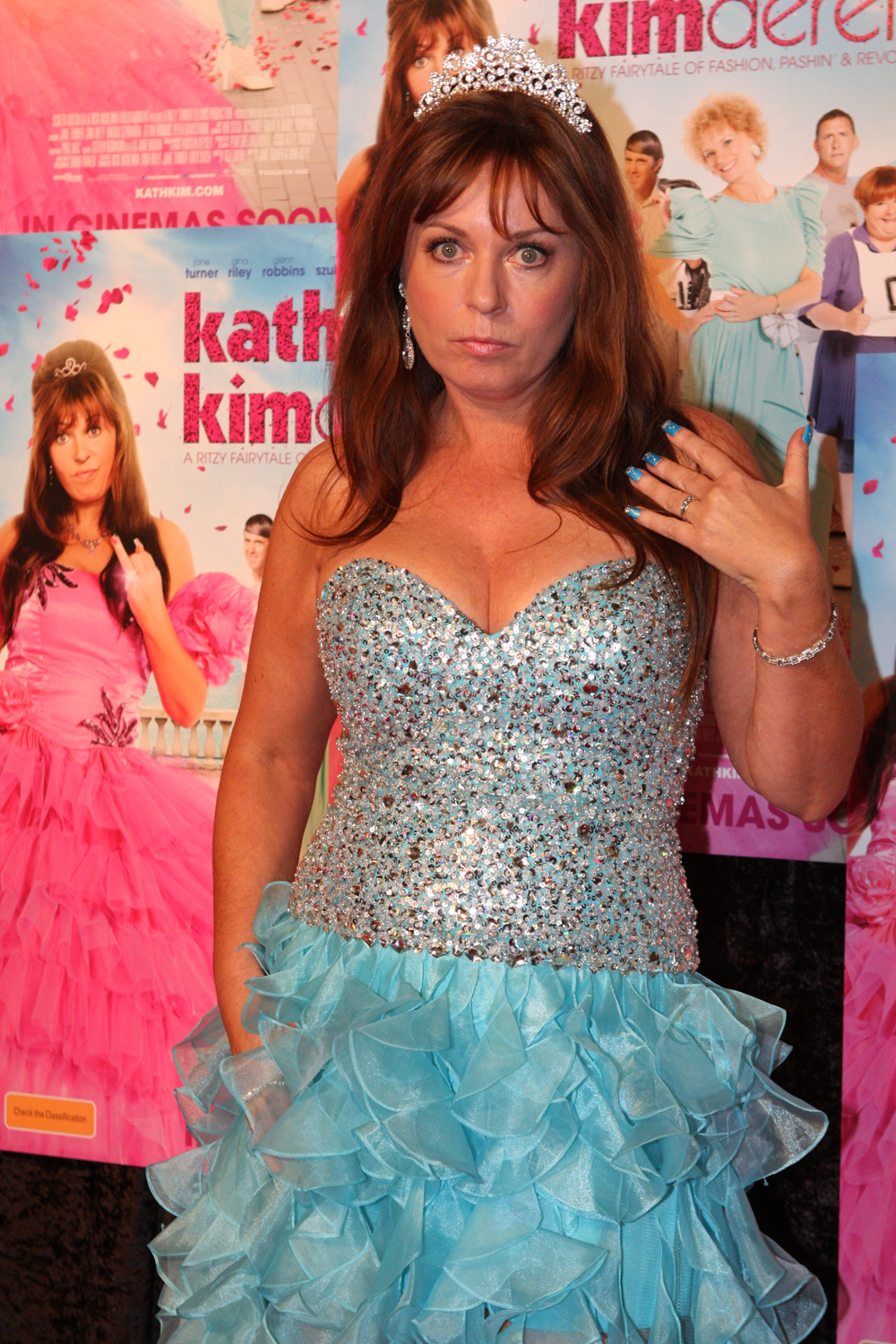
- Riley in character as Kim Craig at the Kath & Kimderella film premiere in August 2012
- Born: 6 May 1961 (age 65); Melbourne, Victoria, Australia
- Occupations: Actress; Writer; Comedian; Singer
- Years active: 1980–2022
- Spouse: Rick McKenna
- Children: 1

Gina Riley (born 6 May 1961) is an Australian retired actress, writer, singer and comedian, known for portraying Kim Craig in the television series Kath & Kim, and for her work in musical theatre.

== Career ==
=== Television and film ===
Riley became a popular television performer in the sketch shows Fast Forward, its successor Full Frontal, Big Girl's Blouse and Something Stupid. In the latter she was also a producer and writer. On Fast Forward, Gina Riley satirised such singers as Tina Arena, Paula Abdul, Bette Midler, Sinéad O'Connor and Dannii Minogue as well as Australian personalities Kerri-Anne Kennerley and Jacki MacDonald. She later appeared in The Games, a spoof behind-the-scenes look at the organising committee of the Sydney Olympics.

She has enjoyed great success as Kim Craig in Kath & Kim, written and created by Riley and her long-time writing partner and friend Jane Turner. Riley also works frequently with Magda Szubanski.

Riley starred as Kim in the Kath and Kim feature film Kath & Kimderella. The film opened in Australia on 6 September 2012, and, despite negative reviews from critics, it was a box-office success, grossing $6,150,771.

In 2015, Riley appeared in an episode of Please Like Me.

In 2022, Riley appeared alongside members of the cast in a Kath and Kim special that screened on Channel 7, which included new skits and unseen footage from the series.

=== Stage ===
In 1987, Riley played the part of 'Chrissie' (loosely based on rock singer Chrissy Amphlett) in Phil Motherwell's musical play Fitzroy Crossing, which enjoyed successful seasons and rave reviews at LaMama Theatre, in Carlton, Victoria. The music for the play was composed by Joe Dolce.

Riley also had roles in musical theatre. In 1992 and 1993, she appeared on stage as Janet in The New Rocky Horror Show; she is included on the cast album. In 1994, she played Trina in Sydney Theatre Company's production of Falsettos, winning a Green Room Award for its Melbourne season. In 1998, she played The Baker's Wife in a Melbourne Theatre Company production of Into the Woods. In 2009, she played Matron 'Mama' Morton in a production of Chicago.

In 2019, Riley starred as Mrs. Lovett in Sweeney Todd: The Demon Barber of Fleet Street opposite Anthony Warlow.

== Personal life ==
Riley is married to Rick McKenna. They are parents to Max McKenna (born 1996) a singer and actor who portrayed Muriel in the original Sydney production of Muriel's Wedding in 2017 and starred as Zoe Murphy in the Dear Evan Hansen US National Tour in 2018.

In March 2013, Riley revealed she was being treated for breast cancer. It was later reported that she made a full recovery.

Riley makes relatively few public appearances as herself. One notable exception was on Enough Rope with Andrew Denton, where she and Turner both appeared as themselves.

== Filmography ==
=== Television ===
Year	Title	Role	Notes
1983	The Sullivans	Elsie	2 episodes
1984	Six of the Best	Sal	
1986	While You're Down There	Various	6 episodes
1986	Just Us	Cathy	TV movie
1990	Acropolis Now	Demi Cashimedes	1 episode
1990–1992	Fast Forward	Various	68 episodes
1992	Bligh	Elizabeth Macarthur	13 episodes
1992	A Royal Commission into the Australian Economy	Peter Harvey	TV movie
1993	Full Frontal	Guest performer	5 episodes
1993	The Making of Nothing	Lyndall Roberts	TV movie
1994	Big Girl's Blouse	Various	9 episodes
1998	Something Stupid	Various	6 episodes
1998–2000	The Games	Gina	26 episodes
2000–2003	The Bob Downe Show	Coralee Hollow	12 episodes
2002–2007	Kath & Kim	Kimberly "Kim" Day Craig / Trude / Robyn Nevinish	32 episodes
2005	Da Kath & Kim Code	Kim Craig / Trude	TV movie
2007	Little Britain: Down Under	Kim Day Craig	TV movie
2015	Open Slather	Various	20 episodes
2015	The Beautiful Lie	Catherine Ballantyne	Miniseries, 6 episodes
2015–2016	Please Like Me	Donna	2 episodes
2017	How to Life	Charlotte Shelton	2 episodes
2022	Fisk	Maureen MacIntyre	1 episode
2022	Our Effluent Life: Kath and Kim	Kim Craig	Miniseries, 2 episodes

=== Film ===
Year	Title	Role	Notes
1986	100% Wool	Therese	
2003	Bad Eggs	AMW Host	Feature film
2012	Kath & Kimderella	Kim Craig (nee Day) / Trude	Feature film
2013	Kath & Kim Kountdown	Kim Craig	
2015	Holding the Man	Popcorn seller (uncredited)	Feature film

== Stage ==
Year	Title	Role	Notes
1980	Cain's Hand		Scott Theatre, Adelaide, St Martins Youth Arts Centre, Melbourne
1980	Slipped Disco	Jean	The Flying Trapeze Cafe, Melbourne
1981	When Lips Collide	Ita	Playbox Theatre, Melbourne
1987	Fitzroy Crossing	Chrissie	La Mama, Melbourne
1988	Dizzy Spells		The Last Laugh, Melbourne
1989	Bob and Coralie's Pick a Hit		The Last Laugh, Melbourne
1990	A Night of Infectious Laughter		Melbourne Athenaeum
1992; 1993	The New Rocky Horror Show	Janet	Comedy Theatre, Melbourne, Her Majesty's Theatre, Sydney
1994	Falsettos	Trina	Sydney Opera House, Monash University, Melbourne, Canberra Theatre with STC; Won Green Room Award
1994	Mack and Mabel – In Concert		State Theatre, Melbourne, State Theatre, Sydney with The Gordon Frost Organisation
1996	Merrily We Roll Along	Mary Flynn	University of Sydney with STC
1997	Big Hair in America	Wanda	Universal Theatre, Melbourne with Stable Productions
1998	Into the Woods	The Baker's Wife	Playhouse, Melbourne with MTC
1999	She Loves Me	Ilona Ritter	Melbourne Concert Hall with The Production Company
2009	Chicago	Matron 'Mama' Morton	Lyric Theatre, Brisbane, Lyric Theatre, Sydney, Her Majesty's Theatre, Melbourne with The Gordon Frost Organisation
2009	Hats Off!		National Theatre, Melbourne
2015	Nice Work if You Can Get It	Estonia Dulworth, The Duchess of Woodford	State Theatre, Melbourne with The Production Company
2016	North by Northwest	Clara Thornhill	State Theatre, Melbourne with MTC
2018	An Ideal Husband	Lady Markby	Playhouse, Melbourne with MTC
2019	Sweeney Todd	Mrs. Lovett	Darling Harbour Theatre, Sydney, Her Majesty's Theatre, Melbourne with Life Like Company
