= Fast Forward (Australian TV series) =

Australian sketch comedy television series

- Genre: Sketch comedy
- Created by: Steve Vizard
- Written by: Andrew Knight; Steve Vizard
- Directed by: Ted Emery
- Starring: Geoff Brooks; Jane Turner; Magda Szubanski; Marg Downey; Michael Veitch; Peter Moon; Steve Blackburn; Ernie Dingo (1989); Steve Vizard (1989–91); Bryan Dawe (1990); Alan Pentland (1990–92, recurring previously); Gina Riley (1990–92); Brendan Luno (1991, recurring previously); Gerry Connolly (1991, recurring previously); Glenn Robbins (1991–92)
- Narrated by: John Deeks
- Theme music composer: Paul Grabowsky
- Composers: Steve Blackburn; Yuri Worontschak
- Country of origin: Australia
- Original language: English
- No. of seasons: 4
- No. of episodes: 90

Production
- Producers: Andrew Knight; Steve Vizard; Ted Emery; Mark Ruse
- Production location: Melbourne
- Running time: 60 minutes
- Production company: Artist Services

Original release
- Network: Seven Network
- Release: 12 April 1989 – 26 November 1992

Related
- Full Frontal; Totally Full Frontal; The D-Generation; Bligh; Big Girl's Blouse; Jimeoin; The Eleventh Hour; Eric; The Micallef Program

Fast Forward is an Australian sketch comedy series, broadcast from April 1989 to November 1992. The show was produced by Steve Vizard, who was also the executive producer, writer, and performer. It starred Jane Turner, Gina Riley, Magda Szubanski, Marg Downey, Michael Veitch, and many others, along with numerous guests and supporting stars.

Fast Forward was succeeded by the related series Full Frontal, and subsequently Totally Full Frontal, which were broadcast from 1993 to 1999.

== Background ==
Many of the stars came from a 1985 Seven Network sketch-comedy pilot called The Eleventh Hour, which also spawned The Comedy Company, via The D-Generation. Fast Forward was commissioned by Seven in late 1988. It was produced by Vizard's production company, United Film Completion, and broadcast on Seven Network. The several working titles for the show include Snapped Cable Television, as well as Fast Forward.

== Production and main cast ==
The show was produced by Steve Vizard, who was also the executive producer, writer, and performer, and starred Jane Turner, Gina Riley, Magda Szubanski (the three of whom went on to star in Kath & Kim), Marg Downey, Michael Veitch, Peter Moon, Alan Pentland, Steve Blackburn, Geoff Brooks, Ernie Dingo, the Rubbery Figures satirical puppets, and numerous guests and supporting stars, such as Gerry Connolly and Bryan Dawe.

Fast Forward was directed by Ted Emery. From its second series onward, Andrew Knight joined Steve Vizard and Ted Emery as executive producers of the show. They went on to establish the leading Australian production house, Artist Services.

== Style ==
Fast Forward was noted for its fast-paced, satirical comedy, which particularly lampooned the media, in particular film and TV, with its parodies of well-known television shows (such as Kung Fu, Lost In Space, The Munsters, and A Current Affair), personalities (such as Clive James, Jana Wendt, Derryn Hinch, and Geoffrey Robertson), and commercials (such as for American Express and Nescafé).

Its subjects were also Australian politics, which it attacked through various political impersonations (including John Howard and Paul Keating), and also using the political puppets, Rubbery Figures, previously seen in small segments on the ABC, based on Peter Nicholson's political cartoons.

Another key distinguishing feature was the use of simulated channel surfing to switch from sketch to sketch, often in the middle of a sketch, sometimes after the punchline. Particularly, a sketch would abruptly switch to a momentary segment of static, followed by another sketch, simulating the effect of the viewer repeatedly switching channels. The channel-surfing device became a distinctive hallmark of the show that helped move quickly from sketch to sketch.

The television and multimedia subject matter of the sketches, pace, style, and devices were differentiated Fast Forward from predecessor sketch-comedy shows of the time, particularly earlier shows such as The Mavis Bramston Show, The Naked Vicar Show, Australia You're Standing In It, The D-Generation, and The Comedy Company. Fast Forward was more media-focused and parody-focused, and the binding force for the whole show was the now-famous channel-changing device.

Fast Forward was also well known for its musical parodies, particularly of current music-video clips. Some of the better-known music parodies included ABBA, Cher, and Dannii Minogue.

== Sketches and content ==
Each episode of Fast Forward featured regular characters, a news-based segment, a major parody of a well-known television show or film, lampoons of television commercials, and political satire, particularly in a segment using the Rubbery Figures political puppets.

Some of the most memorable regular characters included:

- Marg Downey: SBS Presenter
- Magda Szubanski: Pixie-Ann Wheatley; Chenille the Beautician (with Marg Downey as Janelle); the Ugly Couple (with Peter Moon)
- Steve Vizard and Peter Moon: Advertising executives, Brent Smythe and Barry; Indian Rug Fakari salesmen Roger Ramshet and Abdul
- Michael Veitch: gay flight attendants (with Steve Vizard); Kelvin Cunnington; Redmond Herring
- Gerry Connolly: the Queen; Joh Bjelke-Petersen
- Jane Turner: Russian news presenter Sveta (with Peter Moon as Victor), an early incarnation of Kath Day-Knight.
- Steve Vizard: Darren Hunch (parody of Derryn Hinch)
- Ernie Dingo: Robert Gottliebsen
- Steve Blackburn and Geoff Brooks: Arthur and Wayne Dodgy (dodgy salesmen who previously appeared in Australia You're Standing In It)
- Michael Veitch and Glenn Robbins: The Whizz Bang Theatre Company
- Magda Szubanski and Alan Pentland as "Michelle and Ferret", performing a dance routine on New Faces

Some of the most memorable sketches included "Dumb Street", a parody of Home and Away and Neighbours, and a lampoon of Skippy. In one memorable sketch that went to air, Moon and Vizard were both visibly trying to contain their laughter through a series of insults in one of their parodies of Kung Fu.

The political puppets Rubbery Figures were made more "commercial" than on the ABC by inserting them into popular situations outside the political Canberra environment. This led to the Star Trek parody where Paul Keating was Mr. Spock and Bob Hawke was Captain Kirk. Rubbery Figures was a huge hit and a crucial element in the early success of Fast Forward.

In 1991, five Thomas the Tank Engine and Friends skits featured Ertl Thomas models. These segments involved people complaining about Sodor not having female steam engines, the Fat Controller polluting the countryside by pouring purple slime out of the tankers, drunken punks, the engines going on strike, and the engines getting replaced. In these skits, Thomas would do some human things, such as eating breakfast, writing, and going away for the weekend. Percy was referred to as Bertie two times in the first sketch, Gordon at the end of the fourth, and Henry one time in the fifth. The sketches had five original engine characters, Crazy Bartholomew the Loco Locomotive, who was a Thomas model painted yellow, Alfred, who was a Percy model painted red (he was even referred to as Percy at the start of the fifth sketch), Damian the Diesel, who is not seen in person, Edgar, who is a mentioned engine character, and one of the female engines, who was a Percy model painted orange with additional detailing. Toby was also mentioned once at the end of the first sketch, as was Clarabel once in the fourth sketch.

== Episodes ==
Season	Episodes	Originally released	
Season	Episodes	First released	Last released
1	22	12 April 1989	6 September 1989
2	26	19 April 1990	11 October 1990
3	26	11 April 1991	3 October 1991
4	16	13 August 1992	26 November 1992

=== Season 1 (1989) ===
No. overall	No. in season	Title	Directed by	Written by	Original release date
1	1	"Episode 1"	Ted Emery	Gordon Badham, Steve Blackburn, Geoff Brooks	12 April 1989
The Midday Show with Don Lane and Jana Wendt, Burke's Backyard
2	2	"Episode 2"	Ted Emery	Gordon Badham, Steve Blackburn, Geoff Brooks	19 April 1989
3	3	"Episode 3"	Ted Emery	Gordon Badham, Steve Blackburn, Geoff Brooks	26 April 1989
Friday the 13th, Geoffrey Robertson's Hypothetical
4	4	"Episode 4"	Ted Emery	Gordon Badham, Steve Blackburn, Geoff Brooks	3 May 1989
5	5	"Episode 5"	Ted Emery	Gordon Badham, Steve Blackburn, Geoff Brooks	10 May 1989
1989 Logie Awards
6	6	"Episode 6"	Ted Emery	Gordon Badham, Steve Blackburn, Geoff Brooks	17 May 1989
7	7	"Episode 7"	Ted Emery	Gordon Badham, Steve Blackburn, Geoff Brooks	24 May 1989
A Night on Manhattan, Batman
8	8	"Episode 8"	Ted Emery	Gordon Badham, Steve Blackburn, Geoff Brooks	31 May 1989
9	9	"Episode 9"	Ted Emery	Robert Adams, Gordon Badham, Steve Blackburn	7 June 1989
10	10	"Episode 10"	Ted Emery	Gordon Badham, Steve Blackburn, Geoff Brooks	14 June 1989
11	11	"Episode 11"	Ted Emery	Gordon Badham, John barber, Steve Blackburn	21 June 1989
The Towering Poseidon Tidal Earthquake '1977
12	12	"Episode 12"	Ted Emery	Gordon Badham, Steve Blackburn, Geoff Brooks	28 June 1989
Candid Camera
13	13	"Episode 13"	Ted Emery	Robert Adams, Gordon Badham, Steve Blackburn	5 July 1989
Beijing TV News
14	14	"Episode 14"	Ted Emery	Gordon Badham, Steve Blackburn, Geoff Brooks	12 July 1989
15	15	"Episode 15"	Ted Emery	Robert Adams, Gordon Badham, Steve Blackburn	19 July 1989
Tell the Truth
16	16	"Episode 16"	Ted Emery	Robert Adams, Gordon Badham, John Barber	26 July 1989
The Cosby Show, Batman, Beijing TV news
17	17	"Episode 17"	Ted Emery	Robert Adams, Gordon Badham, Steve Blackburn	2 August 1989
Batman, MTV
18	18	"Episode 18"	Ted Emery	Robert Adams, Gordon Badham, Steve Blackburn	9 August 1989
The Addams Family
19	19	"Episode 19"	Ted Emery	Gordon Badham, Steve Blackburn, Geoff Brooks	16 August 1989
Casablanca
20	20	"Episode 20"	Ted Emery	Gordon Badham, Steve Blackburn, Geoff Brooks	23 August 1989
Get Smart
21	21	"Episode 21"	Ted Emery	Steve Blackburn, Geoff Brooks, Ernie Dingo	30 August 1989
Hogan's Heroes
22	22	"Episode 22"	Ted Emery	Steve Blackburn, Geoff Brooks, Ernie Dingo	6 September 1989
Lost in Space

=== Season 2 (1990) ===
No. overall	No. in season	Title	Directed by	Written by	Original release date
23	1	"Episode 1"	Ted Emery	Robert Adams, Gordon Badham, Noel Ballantyne (uncredited)	19 April 1990
Kung-Fu
24	2	"Episode 2"	Ted Emery	Robert Adams, Gordon Badham, Steve Blackburn	26 April 1990
Hawaii Five-O, Tonight Live with Steve Vizard
25	3	"Episode 3"	Ted Emery	Robert Adams, Gordon Badham, Steve Blackburn	3 May 1990
A Country Practice
26	4	"Episode 4"	Ted Emery	Robert Adams, Gordon Badham, Steve Blackburn	10 May 1990
The Beverly Hillbillies, Four Corners
27	5	"Episode 5"	Ted Emery	Robert Adams, Gordon Badham, Steve Blackburn	17 May 1990
The Golden Girls, Beach Party Massacre
28	6	"Episode 6"	Ted Emery	Robert Adams, Gordon Badham, Steve Blackburn	24 May 1990
Happy Days
29	7	"Episode 7"	Ted Emery	Robert Adams, Gordon Badham, Steve Blackburn	31 May 1990
New Faces
30	8	"Episode 8"	Ted Emery	Robert Adams, Steve Blackburn, Geoff Brooks	7 June 1990
The Flintstones
31	9	"Episode 9"	Ted Emery	Robert Adams, Gordon Badham, Steve Blackburn	14 June 1990
I Dream of Jeannie, NBC Today Show
32	10	"Episode 10"	Ted Emery	Robert Adams, Gordon Badham, Steve Blackburn	21 June 1990
Doctor Who
33	11	"Episode 11"	Ted Emery	Robert Adams, Gordon Badham, Steve Blackburn	28 June 1990
The Adventures of Superman, Donahue
34	12	"Episode 12"	Ted Emery	Robert Adams, Gordon Badham, Steve Blackburn	5 July 1990
Prisoner, Floyd on Australian Cooking
35	13	"Episode 13"	Ted Emery	Robert Adams, Gordon Badham, Steve Blackburn	12 July 1990
Play School, Mister Ed
36	14	"Episode 14"	Ted Emery	Robert Adams, Gordon Badham, Steve Blackburn	19 July 1990
Sale of the Century, That's Dancing
37	15	"Episode 15"	Ted Emery	Robert Adams, Gordon Badham, Steve Blackburn	26 July 1990
The Patty Duke Show
38	16	"Episode 16"	Ted Emery	Robert Adams, Gordon Badham, Steve Blackburn	2 August 1990
Sale of the Century, James Bond Goldfinger
39	17	"Episode 17"	Ted Emery	Robert Adams, Gordon Badham, Steve Blackburn	9 August 1990
Perry Mason
40	18	"Episode 18"	Ted Emery	Robert Adams, Gordon Badham, Steve Blackburn	16 August 1990
Bonanza, Seven Samurai
41	19	"Episode 19"	Ted Emery	Robert Adams, Gordon Badham, Steve Blackburn	23 August 1990
Fantasy Island, Dick Smith
42	20	"Episode 20"	Ted Emery	Robert Adams, Gordon Badham, Steve Blackburn	30 August 1990
Skippy, Bewitched, Wheel of Fortune
43	21	"Episode 21"	Ted Emery	Robert Adams, Gordon Badham, Steve Blackburn	6 September 1990
The Partridge Family
44	22	"Episode 22"	Ted Emery	Robert Adams, Gordon Badham, Steve Blackburn	13 September 1990
The Sullivans
45	23	"Episode 23"	Ted Emery	Robert Adams, Steve Blackburn, Geoff Brooks	20 September 1990
Voyage to the Bottom of the Sea, To the Manor Born
46	24	"Episode 24"	Ted Emery	Robert Adams, Gordon Badham, Steve Blackburn	27 September 1990
Gilligan's Island
47	25	"Episode 25"	Ted Emery	Robert Adams, Steve Blackburn, Geoff Brooks	4 October 1990
Cleopatra/The Fall of the Roman Empire, Agatha Christie
48	26	"Episode 26"	Ted Emery	Robert Adams, Gordon Badham, Steve Blackburn	11 October 1990
Pride and Prejudice, The Munsters

=== Season 3 (1991) ===
No. overall	No. in season	Title	Directed by	Written by	Original release date
49	1	"Episode 1"	Ted Emery	Robert Adams, Steve Blackburn, Geoff Brooks	11 April 1991
M*A*S*H
50	2	"Episode 2"	Ted Emery	Robert Adams, Steve Blackburn, Geoff Brooks	18 April 1991
51	3	"Episode 3"	Ted Emery	Robert Adams, Gordon Badham, Steve Blackburn	25 April 1991
Family Feud
52	4	"Episode 4"	Ted Emery	Robert Adams, Gordon Badham, Steve Blackburn	2 May 1991
Batman, Thomas the Tank Engine & Friends
53	5	"Episode 5"	Ted Emery	Robert Adams, Gordon Badham, Steve Blackburn	9 May 1991
Star Trek
54	6	"Episode 6"	Ted Emery	Robert Adams, Gordon Badham, Steve Blackburn	16 May 1991
Donahue
55	7	"Episode 7"	Ted Emery	Robert Adams, Steve Blackburn, Geoff Brooks	23 May 1991
Are You Being Served?
56	8	"Episode 8"	Ted Emery	Robert Adams, Gordon Badham, Steve Blackburn	30 May 1991
Miami Vice
57	9	"Episode 9"	Ted Emery	Robert Adams, Gordon Badham, Steve Blackburn	6 June 1991
The Adventures of Robin Hood
58	10	"Episode 10"	Ted Emery	Robert Adams, Gordon Badham, Steve Blackburn	13 June 1991
Blind Date
59	11	"Episode 11"	Ted Emery	Robert Adams, Steve Blackburn, Geoff Brooks	20 June 1991
The Six Million Dollar Man
60	12	"Episode 12"	Ted Emery	Robert Adams, Gordon Badham, Steve Blackburn	27 June 1991
Dallas
61	13	"Episode 13"	Ted Emery	Robert Adams, Gordon Badham, Steve Blackburn	4 July 1991
The Poseidon Adventure
62	14	"Episode 14"	Ted Emery	Robert Adams, Gordon Badham, Steve Blackburn	11 July 1991
I Love Lucy
63	15	"Episode 15"	Ted Emery	Robert Adams, Gordon Badham, Steve Blackburn	18 July 1991
Dracula
64	16	"Episode 16"	Ted Emery, Kevin Carlin, Jon Olb	Robert Adams, Gordon Badham, Steve Blackburn	25 July 1991
Skippy, Embassy
65	17	"Episode 17"	Kevin Carlin, Jon Olb	Robert Adams, Steve Blackburn, Geoff Brooks	1 August 1991
Sherlock Holmes and The Hound of the Baskervilles
66	18	"Episode 18"	Ted Emery	Robert Adams, Steve Blackburn, Geoff Brooks	8 August 1991
Charlie's Angels
67	19	"Episode 19"	Ted Emery	Robert Adams, Steve Blackburn, Geoff Brooks	15 August 1991
Petticoat Junction
68	20	"Episode 20"	Ted Emery	Robert Adams, Steve Blackburn, Geoff Brooks	22 August 1991
Alien, All Creatures Great and Small
69	21	"Episode 21"	Ted Emery	Robert Adams, Steve Blackburn, Geoff Brooks	29 August 1991
Lost in Space
70	22	"Episode 22"	Ted Emery	Robert Adams, Steve Blackburn, Geoff Brooks	5 September 1991
Fantastic Voyage
71	23	"Episode 23"	Ted Emery	Robert Adams, Gordon Badham, Steve Blackburn	12 September 1991
Indiana Jones and the Temple of Doom
72	24	"Episode 24"	Ted Emery	Robert Adams, Steve Blackburn, Geoff Brooks	19 September 1991
Oprah, Young Talent Time
73	25	"Episode 25"	Ted Emery	Robert Adams, Gordon Badham, Steve Blackburn	26 September 1991
Miss Teen USA
74	26	"Episode 26"	Ted Emery	Robert Adams, Steve Blackburn, Geoff Brooks	3 October 1991
The Midday Show, The Saturday Show

=== Season 4 (1992) ===
No. overall	No. in season	Title	Directed by	Written by	Original release date
75	1	"Episode 1"	Ted Emery	Robert Adams, Steve Blackburn, Geoff Brooks	13 August 1992
Star Wars, The Dating Game, 60 Minutes
76	2	"Episode 2"	Ted Emery	Robert Adams, Steve Blackburn, Geoff Brooks	20 August 1992
The Flying Nun, Flipper, The Book Show, Dumb Street
77	3	"Episode 3"	Ted Emery (uncredited)	Robert Adams, Steve Blackburn, Geoff Brooks	27 August 1992
Apocalypse Now, America's Funniest Bloopers, Backchat, Amazing Stories, A Current Affair
78	4	"Episode 4"	Ted Emery (uncredited)	Robert Adams, John Barber, Steve Blackburn	3 September 1992
Frankenstein, Mother and Son, Donahue
79	5	"Episode 5"	Ted Emery (uncredited)	Robert Adams, Steve Blackburn, Geoff Brooks	10 September 1992
Hard Copy, Godzilla, New Faces, The Book Show, Edith Piaf
80	6	"Episode 6"	Ted Emery (uncredited)	Robert Adams, Steve Blackburn, Geoff Brooks	17 September 1992
The Movie Show, Burke's Backyard, The Hunt for Red October, Four Corners
81	7	"Episode 7"	Ted Emery (uncredited)	Robert Adams, Steve Blackburn, Geoff Brooks	24 September 1992
Picnic at Hanging Rock, Four Corners
82	8	"Episode 8"	Ted Emery (uncredited)	Robert Adams, Steve Blackburn, Geoff Brooks	1 October 1992
The Wizard of Oz, Joseph and the Amazing Technicolor Dreamcoat
83	9	"Episode 9"	Ted Emery (uncredited)	Robert Adams, Steve Blackburn, Geoff Brooks	8 October 1992
The Rocky Horror Picture Show, Strictly Ballroom, The Good, the Bad and the Ugly, Sylvania Waters
84	10	"Episode 10"	Ted Emery (uncredited)	Robert Adams, Steve Blackburn, Geoff Brooks	15 October 1992
Gone With the Wind, Sylvania Waters
85	11	"Episode 11"	Ted Emery (uncredited)	Robert Adams, Steve Blackburn, Geoff Brooks	22 October 1992
Casablanca, Open University, Sylvania Waters
86	12	"Episode 12"	Ted Emery (uncredited)	Robert Adams, Steve Blackburn, Geoff Brooks	29 October 1992
Chariots of Fire, Psycho, Romeo and Juliet
87	13	"Episode 13"	Ted Emery	Robert Adams, Steve Blackburn, Geoff Brooks	5 November 1992
King Kong, Blood Frenzy Massacre 2, 4 Corners
88	14	"Episode 14"	Ted Emery	Robert Adams, Steve Blackburn, Geoff Brooks	12 November 1992
E.T.
89	15	"Episode 15"	Ted Emery	Robert Adams, Steve Blackburn, Geoff Brooks	19 November 1992
Blake's 7, The Saturday Show
90	16	"Episode 16"	Ted Emery	Robert Adams, Steve Blackburn, Geoff Brooks	26 November 1992
Play School, The Sound of Music

== Specials ==
- Fast Forward Exposed (20 April 1993, 45 minutes)
- A Royal Commission into the Australian Economy (5 May 1993, 90 minutes)
- 38 and a Bit Fabulous Years of Australian Television (13 February 1994, 60 minutes)
- The Making of Nothing (20 February 1994, 60 minutes)
- Standing on the Road (1994, 60 minutes)
- Fast Forward Rewinds Steve Vizard (4 July 1994, 60 minutes)
- Fast Forward's Funniest TV Send-Ups (1994, 12 half-hour episodes)
- Fast Forward's Funniest Moments (27 April-13 July 1998, 12 one-hour episodes)
- Ten-Year Bash (October 2002, 48 minutes)
- One More Round (2003, 60 minutes)
- Dragging up the Past (2003, 60 minutes)

== Reception and legacy ==
Fast Forward was Australia's highest-rating and most critically awarded commercial television sketch comedy] show, broadcast for 90 one-hour episodes from 12 April 1989 to 26 November 1992.

It consistently won the ratings for all of its 90 episodes, generally rating in the mid- to high 30s.

The production team and cast decided in late 1992, despite offers to renew from Channel 7, to end the program "on a high", feeling that they did not want it to go downhill and tarnish its legacy as one of Australia's best-ever sketch comedy shows.

Fast Forward was succeeded by the related series Full Frontal, and subsequently Totally Full Frontal, which were broadcast from 1993 to 1999. Full Frontal had a different main cast, but many of the Fast Forward cast guest-starred.

All four seasons plus five "best of" compilations of Fast Forward have been released on DVD. All four seasons were re-released in 2010.

In 2013, the Network Ten-owned channel, One, began airing half-hour-long specials titled Fast Forward Funniest Send-Ups, which first aired in 1994, making it the first time the show has been shown since 1998.

Alan Pentland, who had run Melbourne's first stand-up club, Le Joke also worked with Daryl Somers on Hey Hey It's Saturday. He wrote and performed a two-minute summary of the theory of evolution titled "Darwin's Human Race" (1999), which won Best Animation at Sydney Film Festival, Colorado Mountain Festival, and Nashville Film Festival. He worked in various executive roles in television for around 25 years before turning to writing and performing poetry in 2016, winning a slam poetry competition and the Melbourne Spoken Word Prize in 2017.

== Awards and nominations ==
In 1990, Fast Forward won two Logie Awards; it also received two Australian Television awards (Penguins) for Excellence in Make-up and Achievement in Production. Also in 1990, the company was bestowed with two AWGIEs, the Australian Writers' Guild Awards; one for Fast Forward for best Comedy/Revue/Sketch and the other for Vizard, Co-writer Best Sketch Comedy – Fast Forward. The Variety Club awarded Vizard Comedy Artist Of The Year and Rolling Stone magazine awarded him Television Performer of the Year.

At the 1991 Logie Awards Steve Vizard won the Gold Logie for Most Popular Personality on Australian Television. Vizard also won Most Popular Male Light Entertainer. Magda Szubanski won Most Popular Female Light Entertainer and Fast Forward was awarded Most Popular Light Entertainment Program. Also in 1991, the Fast Forward writing team won an AWGIE for Best Sketch Comedy for Fast Forward.

At the 1992 Logies, Magda Szubanski once again picked up the award for Most Popular Female Performer – Light Entertainment and Fast Forward received the Logie for Most Popular Light Entertainment Program. The Australian Writers Guild presented an AWGIE to Fast Forward for Best Sketch Comedy. Fast Forward also picked up a People's Choice Award for Most Popular Program on Australian Television.

The following year, 1993, Fast Forward won a Logie for Most Popular Comedy Program.

ARIA Music Awards

The ARIA Music Awards is an annual awards ceremony held by the Australian Recording Industry Association. They commenced in 1987.

Year	Nominee / work	Award	Result	Ref.
1990	Fast Forward - Take One	Best Comedy Release	Nominated	

== Home media ==
=== Albums releases ===
List of albums, with Australian chart positions
Title	Album details	Peak chart positions
Title	Album details	AUS
Fast Forward Take One	Released: December 1989; Format: LP; Label: Liberation/CBS (105225 1)	61

=== DVD releases ===
DVD title	Release date	Discs	Versions	Ref.
Fast Forward: In Rewind, Funniest Moments – Volume One	28 April 2004	2	Compilation	
Fast Forward: In Rewind, Funniest Moments – Volume Two	7 May 2004	2	Compilation	
Fast Forward: Funniest TV Send Ups, Vol. 1	21 March 2005	1	Compilation	
Fast Forward: Funniest TV Send Ups, Vol. 2	23 May 2005	1	Compilation	
Fast Forward: Funniest TV Send Ups, Vol. 3	20 June 2005	1	Compilation	
Fast Forward: The Complete Season One	20 March 2006	5	Season sets	
Fast Forward: The Complete Season Two	23 October 2006	6	Season sets	
Fast Forward: The Complete Season Three	4 December 2006	6	Season sets	
Fast Forward: The Complete Season Four	18 January 2008	5	Season sets	
Fast Forward: Series 1	22 March 2010	5	Season re-releases	
Fast Forward: Series 2	22 March 2010	6	Season re-releases	
Fast Forward: Series 3	9 June 2010	6	Season re-releases	
Fast Forward: Series 4	9 June 2010	5	Season re-releases	

== Adaptation ==
The show was adapted for German television under the name Switch by the TV station ProSieben. It was aired for the first time in 1997.
