= Andrew Knight (writer) =

Australian screenwriter and producer

- Occupation: Screenwriter

Andrew John Knight is an Australian TV writer and producer of film and television, known for his work on Rake, Jack Irish, Hacksaw Ridge, Ali's Wedding and The Water Diviner.

== Career ==
Knight co-produced and wrote The Broken Shore, produced and wrote Siam Sunset for Artist Services, and wrote telemovie Mumbo Jumbo. He has also been involved in many comedy shows, co-producing and writing for The Fast Lane, Fast Forward, The D-Generation, and writing for Full Frontal. He was co-creator, principal writer and executive producer of the ABC drama SeaChange.

In 1989, he co founded, with Steve Vizard, the production company Artist Services, and in 2000, he formed Cornerstore Films, which has produced three major television series including the award-winning After The Deluge, which Andrew wrote and produced.

== Recognition and awards ==
At the 2015 AACTA Awards, Knight received the Longford Lyell Award for Outstanding Lifetime Achievement.

Other awards include:

- 2015 Australian Writers' Guild Award for An Original Feature Film Script, The Water Diviner (co-written with Andrew Anastasios)
- 2016 AACTA Award for Best Original Screenplay, Hacksaw Ridge (co-written with Robert Schenkkan)
- 2016 Australian Writers' Guild Award (AWGIE) for An Original Feature Film Script Ali's Wedding (co-written with Osamah Sami)
- 2017 AACTA Award for Best Original Screenplay, for Ali's Wedding
