= Kath & Kim =

Australian comedy television series

- Genre: Sitcom
- Created by: Jane Turner; Gina Riley
- Written by: Jane Turner; Gina Riley
- Directed by: Ted Emery
- Starring: Jane Turner; Gina Riley; Magda Szubanski; Peter Rowsthorn; Glenn Robbins
- Opening theme: "The Joker"
- Country of origin: Australia
- Original language: English
- No. of seasons: 4
- No. of episodes: 32 (list of episodes)

Production
- Production locations: Melbourne, Victoria, Australia
- Editor: Steven Robinson
- Running time: 25 minutes
- Production companies: Australian Broadcasting Corporation; Riley Turner Productions

Original release
- Network: ABC
- Release: 16 May 2002 – 27 November 2005
- Network: Seven Network
- Release: 19 August – 14 October 2007

Kath & Kim (also written as Kath and Kim) is an Australian sitcom that aired on the prime-time slot on ABC Television from 2002 to 2005 and on Seven Network in 2007. The show was produced by Riley and Turner Productions, the firm of Jane Turner and Gina Riley, who star as the titular characters of Kath Day-Knight, a cheery, middle-aged suburban mother, and Kim Craig, her narcissistic daughter. Additional cast members include Glenn Robbins as Kel Knight, Kath's metrosexual boyfriend (later husband); Peter Rowsthorn as Brett Craig, Kim's henpecked husband; and Magda Szubanski as her lonely "second-best friend" Sharon Strzelecki. The series is set in Fountain Lakes, a fictional suburb of Melbourne, Victoria. The series received highly positive reviews from critics, who praised the humour and cast performances, particularly of Turner and Riley.

Aside from the television series which comprises four seasons, the franchise also includes a television film, Da Kath & Kim Code (2005), and a feature film, Kath & Kimderella (2012). The series also spawned a short-lived American remake, which ran for 17 episodes between 2008 and 2009.

A two-part special to mark its 20th anniversary, titled Kath & Kim: Our Effluent Life and Kath and Kim: 20 Preposterous Years, was screened on 20–21 November 2022.

== Premise ==
Kath & Kim follows the day-to-day Australian suburban life of Kath Day-Knight (Jane Turner), her only child Kimberly (Kim) Diane Craig née Day (Gina Riley), Kim's husband and Computa City salesman, Brett Craig (Peter Rowsthorn), Kath's love interest and eventual husband who works as a "purveyor of fine meats", Kel Knight (Glenn Robbins), and long-time family friend Sharon Strzelecki (Magda Szubanski).

Storylines follow the characters' day-to-day lives, and document their personal struggles and the banality of their achievements and aspirations. Kath & Kim satirises the mother-daughter relationship and the habits and values of modern suburban Australians, and emphasises the kitsch and superficial elements of contemporary society, particularly the traditional working class which has progressed to a level of affluence (or "effluence" as the show's title characters would have it) which previous generations had been unable to achieve. Despite this affluence, good taste and cultural sophistication still elude the show's characters.

They visit places such as the Westfield Fountain Gate (some parts filmed at Westfield Southland), the local IKEA, Target and various local restaurants.

It also occasionally mocks Australian and international mass popular culture, such as popular reality television shows Big Brother and Australian Idol. It sometimes makes statements about Australian politics. The crass and embarrassing behaviour of the characters, and their gaudy, out-dated retro fashion sense are popular features of the show. Processed and widely recognised Australian foods, such as Jatz crackers, Tim Tams and Fruche yoghurt are frequently referenced in the series.

Most episodes end with Kath and Kim sitting in Kath's back yard, chatting about issues related to the episode. Sometimes these chats help to complete the story which was told during the episode. This final element is accompanied by the show's credits.

== Cast and characters ==
=== Main cast ===
- Jane Turner as Kath Day-Knight – A middle-aged suburban woman who strives to keep herself fit.
- Gina Riley as Kim Craig – Kath's 20-something-year-old daughter who is known for being lazy and extremely self-centred.
- Magda Szubanski as Sharon Strzelecki – Kim's "second-best friend", described as very lonely, unlucky in love and a sports enthusiast.
- Glenn Robbins as Kel Knight – Kath's boyfriend and later husband, a metrosexual man who is a local "purveyor of fine meats".
- Peter Rowsthorn as Brett Craig – Kim's henpecked husband whom she refers to as a "complete dud".

=== Recurring cast ===
- Zara Harrington, Emma Le Boeuf and Makayla Berkers as Epponnee-Rae Craig – Kim's baby (series 2, episode 8 and onwards), and Morghyne de Vries played her as a young girl in the movie.
- Jane Turner and Gina Riley as Prue and Trude, two snobby women who work in a homewares store (8 episodes, TV movie, plus movie)
- Marg Downey as Marion, a new-age marriage celebrant and counsellor (6 episodes + movie)
- Mick Molloy as Gary Poole, Kim's father (2 episodes, plus movie)
- William McInnes (credited as Rock Hampton) as Sandy Freckle, long-time friend of Kel (2 episodes)
- Tony Martin as Mark, romantic interest of Sharon (4 episodes)
- Peta Brady as Kelly, Brett's supervisor at work (4 episodes, plus TV movie)
- Mark Trevorrow as Daryl Lee, a camp man who works in a menswear shop (3 episodes, plus TV movie). Trevorrow also plays a similar character in the movie.
- Luke Lennox as Brodie (1 episode, plus TV movie)
- Matt Lucas as Karen, Sharon's maternal half-sister (2 episodes)
- Shivantha Wijesinha as Imran (2 episodes)

=== Guest cast ===
- Eric Bana as himself (1 episode)
- Alan Brough (first name used, 1 episode)
- Michael Bublé as himself (TV movie)
- Sibylla Budd as Lisa-Marie Birkenstock (1 episode)
- Rhonda Burchmore as herself (TV movie)
- Glenn Butcher as Rental-Car Agent (TV movie)
- John Clarke as Real-Estate Agent (1 episode)
- Vince Colosimo as Jared (1 episode)
- Gerry Connolly as Merrill Streep (1 episode)
- Rachel Griffiths as herself (1 episode)
- Donna Hay as herself
- Jane Menelaus as Jane (1 episode)
- Mark Holden as himself (1 episode)
- Bill Granger as himself
- Barry Humphries as Monk (TV movie) and as Dame Edna Everage (in the movie)
- Colin Lane as Spa Salesman (1 episode)
- Maggie Beer as herself
- Judith Lucy as Santa's Helper (TV movie)
- Rove McManus as himself
- Shannon Bennett as himself
- Kylie Minogue as adult Epponnee-Rae Craig (episode 3x8, brief appearance in episode 3x7)
- Bridget Neval as Amber (1 episode)
- Andrew O'Keefe as himself
- Geoffrey Rush as Geoff (1 episode)
- Kylie Kwong as herself
- Kate Atkinson as Shop Assistant.
- Rob Sitch (1 episode)
- Nicholas Bell as Airline Rep (1 episode)
- Shane Warne as a Shane Warne impersonator (1 episode)
- Lynda Gibson as Health Spa Patient (1 episode)
- The Wiggles as themselves (TV movie)
- Frank Woodley (1 episode, plus movie)
- Alex Menglet as photographer (1 episode)
- Helen Thomson as Receptionist

Several guest stars are well-known Australian comedy performers, some of whom previously worked with Turner or Riley. Bublé and Lucas were fans of the show and asked to appear in it. Humphries declared himself a fan of the series before taking part.

== Episodes ==
Season	Episodes	Originally released		
Season	Episodes	First released	Last released	Network
1	8	16 May 2002	4 July 2002	ABC
2	8	18 September 2003	6 November 2003	ABC
3	8	7 October 2004	25 November 2004	ABC
Telemovie		27 November 2005		ABC
4	8	19 August 2007	14 October 2007	Seven Network
Movie		6 September 2012		—N/a
5	2	20 November 2022	21 November 2022	Seven Network

=== Overview ===
The storyline of the first series follows Kath's engagement and plans for her wedding to Kel. Kim frequently stays in her mother's house owing to her rocky relationship with Brett (most of which is due to her own childish, spoilt, and rude behaviour towards Brett). Sharon's always around with a helping hand and her own relationship problems. Her history with Brett is also explored.

The second series follows Kim's pregnancy and her rekindled relationship with Brett. Kath and Kel's relationship goes through some teething troubles. Kim and Brett have a baby in the final episode of the second series whom they name Epponnee Raelene Kathleen Darlene Charlene Craig, shortened to Epponnee Rae. Several episodes of the third series focus on Epponnee Rae. The third-season finale features an adult Epponnee Rae, played by Kylie Minogue. The fourth series focused a lot more on Sharon, she meets her half sibling, wins $20k on Deal or No Deal, commits adultery with Brett, and finally finds love, marriage and divorce.

== Production ==
=== Development ===
The characters of Kath, Kim (created by Riley and Turner) and Sharon (created and played by Magda Szubanski) first featured in their current forms during the mid-1990s as a weekly segment of the Australian comedy series Big Girl's Blouse (Seven, 1994–95), having appeared in an embryonic incarnation earlier in the decade on the sketch comedy show Fast Forward (Seven, 1989–92). They also appeared in Something Stupid (Seven, 1998). Robbins had also appeared on Fast Forward, while Rowsthorn and Robbins had previously worked together on The Comedy Company.

The skits were developed by Riley and Turner into a full series. Big Girl's Blouse had been deemed a failure by the ABC head of comedy Geoff Portman who wanted to pull Kath and Kim. But it was championed by Sandra Levy the ABC Head of Television so Kath and Kim had the distinction for a comedy show of being produced by the drama department, and was loved by a very broad audience, including the "suburban people" it parodied.

The name of the series "Kath and Kim" is a pun of the idiom kith and kin which is an old fashioned idiom for 'friends and family'.

Twenty-four episodes lasting approximately twenty-five minutes each across three seasons aired on ABC TV from 2002 to 2004. The series debuted on 15 May 2002 on the ABC Network with "Sex" and became one of the highest-rated shows for ABC. A replacement of a full series occurred in 2005 with the telemovie Da Kath & Kim Code. The fourth season of Kath & Kim began airing on the Seven Network on 19 August 2007; the arrangement with Seven having begun after their contract with the ABC expired.

In late 2009, they announced that writing had begun on season 5, but by May 2010, Turner said: "We sort of felt like it was the end two years ago. We thought, 'We've done enough and the well is dry and we can't think of any more ideas' ... We think we might just leave it for now."

=== Writing ===
The alternative vocabulary including the mixed metaphors, hypercorrection, malapropisms, eggcorns (like "ravishing" instead of "ravenous"), and mis-pronunciations of the regular characters are much repeated by the show's fans. These include: "Look at moi” (look at me)—used by Kath to command attention during arguments, and "It's noice, different and unusual"—used by Kath, Kim and Sharon to express approval or agreement.

=== Filming ===
Kath's home, known as "Chateau Kath", was within the fictionalised suburb of Fountain Lakes, and served as the central filming location for the series. The home, located in Patterson Lakes, Victoria, 35 km east of Melbourne, was originally rented by ABC during the entire run of the series, and chosen for its likeness to Sylvania Waters. The property backs onto a canal, which ABC fenced off during filming in order for it to look more suburban. It was sold in 2016 for $1,485,000. The house was demolished in July 2022.

Other footage was filmed around the Melbourne suburbs of Cheltenham and Moorabbin; scenes set at Fountain Gate were actually filmed at Westfield Southland.

=== Costuming ===
Second-hand shops were used for Kath's clothing, whereas Kim was dressed in current trends.

=== Theme music and opening titles ===
The theme music for Kath and Kim is performed by Gina Riley and is a cover of Anthony Newley's "The Joker", performed in the style of Shirley Bassey's recording of the song. A reworked recording of its debut in the telemovie opening sequence, was utilised for the show's run on the Seven Network.

The title sequence shows the main five regular characters over a white background. In season 3, it was amended to include Epponnee-Rae and Cujo, before switching to a revised version of the previous sequence for the Seven Network run, where Cujo was retained. The five regular cast members are then credited over aerial shots of suburban houses (Szubanski is credited as a "special guest" despite appearing in every episode) before fading into an aerial shot of Kath and Kim's house (some episodes replace it with an aerial shot of the mall, while the episode "The Wedding" replaced it with a ground-level shot of a hospital).

== Broadcast ==
Kath & Kim was broadcast Thursday nights at 8.30 pm throughout its run on ABC, while Seven Network aired the series Sunday nights at 7.30 pm.

The series premiered in the United Kingdom in April 2004, when it was broadcast on the now-defunct subscription channel LivingTV, and later on Ftn. It made its terrestrial television debut when it screened on BBC Two from 12 May 2005. The fourth season has never been broadcast in the UK, but did premiere when it was made available on Netflix.

In 2017, the rights to the series were acquired by the Nine Network, which began airing repeats of the series from 1 August 2017 until 21 November 2017.

In 2018, the series was released on Netflix in several regions, as well as the films and TV specials. In July 2019, the series was launched onto Netflix in Australia as well as the Kountdown Specials and Souvenir Editions.

In 2022, to mark its 20th anniversary, the Seven Network began airing repeats of the series from 29 September 2022.

== Reception ==
=== Ratings ===
Kath & Kim premiered on 16 May 2002 and became one of ABC's highest-rated shows. When the show premiered on the Seven Network, it became the highest-rating episode in Australian television history, until the record was broken by Nine Network's Underbelly: A Tale of Two Cities on 9 February 2009. The fourth season of Kath & Kim debuted with a record-breaking 2.511 million viewers peaking at 2.731 million. In its second and third episodes viewers fell to 1.994 & 1.817 million, respectively; however, viewers then rebounded for its fourth and fifth episodes with ratings of 2.047 and 2.157 million, respectively. Strong ratings continued with viewers of 2.049 and 2.066 million for the sixth and seventh episodes. The eighth episode and show's finale rated 2.338 million giving the fourth season an average viewership of 2.122 million, making it the highest-rating TV season in Australia for 2007 and the highest-rating of all four seasons of the show.

In 2007, Channel Seven started showing repeats of the show from season one onwards which had previously only aired on the ABC network. The repeats proved quite successful, with the first two rating 1.465 and 1.530 million, winning in a very competitive timeslot and being amongst the highest-rating shows of the week.

In the UK, its BBC premiere drew viewing figures of 1.691 million in May 2005.

Season	Timeslot (Australian)	Episodes	First aired	Last aired	Network	Rank	Avg. viewers (millions)
1	Thursday 8:30 pm	8	16 May 2002	4 July 2002	ABC	15	1.254
2	Thursday 8:30 pm	8	18 September 2003	6 November 2003	ABC	1	1.755
3	Thursday 8:30 pm	8	7 October 2004	25 November 2004	ABC	1	1.829
4	Sunday 7:30 pm	8	19 August 2007	14 October 2007	Seven Network	1	2.127

=== Awards and nominations ===
Year	Award	Category	Nominee	Result	Notes	Ref.
2002	AFI Awards	Best Television Drama Series	Mark Ruse (producer)	Won	(Note: AFI award for Best Television Drama Series – Season 1)	
2002	AFI Awards	Best Actress in a Supporting or Guest Role in a Television Drama or Comedy	Magda Szubanski	Won	(Note: AFI Award for Best Actress in a Supporting or Guest Role in a Television Drama or Comedy – Season 1, episode 8)	
2002	AFI Awards	Best Screenplay in a Television Drama	Gina Riley, Jane Turner	Won	(Note: AFI Award for Best Screenplay in a Television Drama – Season 1, episode 8)	
2002	AFI Awards	Best Screenplay in a Television Drama	Gina Riley, Jane Turner	Nominated	(Note: AFI Award for Best Screenplay in a Television Drama – Season 1, episode 2)	
2003	AFI Awards	Best Actor in a Leading Role in a Television Drama or Comedy	Glenn Robbins	Nominated	(Note: KPMG AFI Award for Best Actor in a Leading Role in a Television Drama or Comedy – Season 2)	
2003	AFI Awards	Best Actress in a Leading Role in a Television Drama or Comedy	Jane Turner	Nominated	(Note: Max Factor AFI Award for Best Actor in a Leading Role in a Television Drama or Comedy – Season 2)	
2003	AFI Awards	Best Actress in a Supporting or Guest Role in a Television Drama or Comedy	Magda Szubanski	Nominated	(Note: AFI Award for Best Actress in a Supporting or Guest Role in a Television Drama or Comedy – Season 2)	
2004	AFI Awards	Best Comedy Series - Sitcom or Sketch	Gina Riley, Mark Ruse, Jane Turner	Nominated	(Note: AFI Award for Best Comedy Series - Sitcom or Sketch – Season 3)	
2004	AFI Awards	Best Actress in a Leading Role in a Television Drama or Comedy	Gina Riley	Nominated	(Note: Napoleon Perdis AFI Award for Best Actress in a Leading Role in a Television Drama or Comedy – Season 3)	
2004	AFI Awards	Best Actress in a Leading Role in a Television Drama or Comedy	Jane Turner	Nominated	(Note: Napoleon Perdis AFI Award for Best Actress in a Leading Role in a Television Drama or Comedy – Season 3)	
2004	AFI Awards	Best Actor in a Supporting or Guest Role in a Television Drama or Comedy	Glenn Robbins	Nominated	(Note: AFI Award for Best Actor in a Supporting or Guest Role in a Television Drama or Comedy – Season 3)	
2004	AFI Awards	Best Actress in a Supporting or Guest Role in a Television Drama or Comedy	Magda Szubanski	Nominated	(Note: AFI Award for Best Actress in a Supporting or Guest Role in a Television Drama or Comedy – Season 3)	
2004	AFI Awards	Best Screenplay in a Television	Gina Riley, Jane Turner	Nominated	(Note: AFI Award for Best Screenplay in a Television – Season 3, episode 8)	
2004	AFI Awards	Outstanding Achievement in Craft in Television	Kitty Stuckey	Won	(Note: AFI Award for Outstanding Achievement in Craft in Television – Season 3)	
2003	Logie Awards	Most Popular Light Entertainment Program	Kath & Kim	Nominated	(Note: Logie Award for Most Popular Light Entertainment Program – Season 1)	
2003	Logie Awards	Most Outstanding Comedy Program	Kath & Kim	Won	(Note: Logie Award for Most Outstanding Comedy Program – Season 1)	
2004	Logie Awards	Most Popular Actor	Glenn Robbins	Nominated	(Note: Logie Award for Most Popular Actor – Season 2)	
2004	Logie Awards	Most Popular Light Entertainment Program	Kath & Kim	Nominated	(Note: Logie Award for Most Popular Light Entertainment Program – Season 2)	
2004	Logie Awards	Most Outstanding Comedy Program	Kath & Kim	Won	(Note: Logie Award for Most Outstanding Comedy Program – Season 2 (tied with CNNNN))	
2005	Logie Awards	Most Popular Actress	Gina Riley	Nominated	(Note: Logie Award for Most Popular Actress – Season 3)	
2005	Logie Awards	Most Popular Actress	Magda Szubanski	Nominated	(Note: Logie Award for Most Popular Actress – Season 3)	
2005	Logie Awards	Most Popular Actor	Glenn Robbins	Nominated	(Note: Logie Award for Most Popular Actor – Season 3)	
2005	Logie Awards	Most Popular Light Entertainment Program	Kath & Kim	Nominated	(Note: Logie Award for Most Popular Light Entertainment Program – Season 3)	
2005	Logie Awards	Most Outstanding Comedy Program	Kath & Kim	Nominated	(Note: Logie Award for Most Outstanding Comedy Program – Season 3)	
2006	Logie Awards	Most Popular Actor	Glenn Robbins	Nominated	(Note: Logie Award for Most Popular Actor – Da Kath & Kim Code)	
2006	Logie Awards	Most Outstanding Miniseries or Telemovie	Da Kath & Kim Code	Nominated	(Note: Logie Award for Most Outstanding Miniseries or Telemovie – Da Kath & Kim Code)	
2008	Logie Awards	Most Popular Actress	Magda Szubanski	Nominated	(Note: Logie Award for Most Popular Actress – Season 4)	
2008	Logie Awards	Most Popular Actor	Glenn Robbins	Nominated	(Note: Logie Award for Most Popular Actor – Season 4)	
2008	Logie Awards	Most Popular Light Entertainment Program	Kath & Kim	Won	(Note: Logie Award for Most Popular Light Entertainment Program – Season 4)	
2008	Logie Awards	Most Outstanding Comedy Program	Kath & Kim	Nominated	(Note: Logie Award for Most Outstanding Comedy Program – Season 4)	
2023	TV Tonight Awards	Best Australian Comedy	Kath & Kim (2022 specials)	Nominated		

=== Honours ===
Year	Honour	Character/Show	Result	Notes	Ref.
2024	TV Week 100 Greatest Aussie Characters of All Time	Kath Day-Night	3rd place	(Note: Kath Day-Night ranked 3rd place behind Irene Roberts (Lynne McGranger) – Home and Away, in 2nd place and Alf Stewart (Ray Meagher) – Home and Away, at 1st place.)	
2024	TV Week 100 Greatest Aussie Characters of All Time	Kim Craig	5th place	(Note: Kim Craig ranked 5th place behind Darryl 'Brax' Braxton (Steve Peacocke) – Home and Away, in 4th place.)	
2024	TV Week 100 Greatest Aussie Characters of All Time	Sharon Strzelecki	7th place	(Note: Sharon Strzelecki ranked 7th place behind Sally Fletcher (Kate Ritchie) – Home and Away, in 6th place.)	
2026	TV Week 70 Best Australian TV Shows of All Time	Kath & Kim	1st place	(Note: Announced by TV Week in August 2026.)	

== Home media ==
The enduring public interest and popularity of Kath and Kim has led to a merchandising industry. The title family and supporting characters appear on everything from T-shirts to posters. The Kath & Kim series have been released on VHS (although titles are now discontinued in the VHS format) and DVD, in box sets and separate series editions in both region 4 (Australia, New Zealand, Latin America) as well as region 2 (Europe). The series has also had a CD release, featuring songs from the series and recordings from Kath and Kim. In addition, there has been clothing (such as aprons, T-shirts and oven mitts). Merchandise is available to purchase online from the official Kath & Kim website.

=== DVD releases ===
Title	Release date		Additional
Title	Region 2	Region 4	Additional
Single sets
Series 1	20 June 2005	8 October 2002	8 episodes; 2-disc set; 202 minutes; 1.78:1 aspect ratio; English Dolby Digital 2.0; English subtitles (hard of hearing); Ratings: ACB: PG; BBFC: 15; Special features: Features entitled "Being Stewpid", "Wine Time Philosophy" and "Scenes that are different, un-ewes-yewl" as well as re-living Brett And Kim's Connubials!: Re-released in UK via 2Entertain with alternative cover art on 7 December 2009.
Series 2	27 November 2006	24 November 2003	8 episodes; 2-disc set; 215 minutes; 1.78:1 aspect ratio; English Dolby Digital 2.0; English subtitles (hard of hearing); Ratings: ACB: PG; BBFC: 12; Special features: Features entitled "A bit of huffy puffy with Kath and Kel", "More Yumor", "More Wine Time philosophy" and "Scenes that are different, un-ewes-yewl".: Re-released in UK via 2Entertain with alternative cover art on 7 December 2009.
Series 3	TBA	26 November 2004	8 episodes; 2-disc set; 248 minutes; 1.78:1 aspect ratio; English Dolby Digital 2.0; No subtitles; Ratings: ACB: PG; Special features: feature entitled "'In the Raw' with Kath & Kim" as well as goof reels, deleted scenes, a performance of "Lady Bump" at the Logies, interviews with Kath & Kim, bonus "Wine Time" material as well as Prue and Trued telling it how it is.
Da Kath & Kim Code	TBA	2 December 2005	1 telemovie; 2-disc set; 164 minutes; 1.78:1 aspect ratio; English Dolby Digital 2.0; English subtitles (hard of hearing); Ratings: ACB: PG; Special features: including an extended ending for the telemovie, behind the scenes, goofs, a feature entitled "Barry Humphries at 'The Buckingham'", deleted scenes as well as a feature entitled "Kath & Kim & Bert". The release also includes "Live in London" content which includes Kath & Kim live at the Toast Festival, wine tasting, talking to the BBC as well as having "A Current Affair".
Series 4	TBA	17 October 2007	8 episodes; 2-disc set; 265 minutes; 1.78:1 aspect ratio; English Dolby Digital 2.0; English subtitles (hard of hearing); English Audio Description; Ratings: ACB: PG; Special features: Includes "Stupid Goofs", "behind-the-scenes with Kath & Kim", "Little Britain meet the foxy ladies & see Ricky Pointing & Adam Gilchrist cook-off with Kath & Kim".
Multiple, compilation and re-issue sets
Series 1 & 2	27 November 2006	8 April 2004	16 episodes; 4-disc set; 431 minutes; 1.78:1 aspect ratio; English Dolby Digital 2.0; English subtitles (hard of hearing); Ratings: ACB: PG; BBFC: 15; Special features: See individual releases
Series 1–3	No release	7 April 2005	24 episodes; 6-disc set; 686 minutes; 1.78:1 aspect ratio; English Dolby Digital 2.0; Ratings: ACB: PG; Special features: See individual releases
Series 1 (repackaged)	No release	2007	8 episodes; 2-disc set; 202 minutes; 1.78:1 aspect ratio; English Dolby Digital 2.0; Ratings: ACB: PG; Special features: See original release
Kel's Choice Cuts	No release	6 November 2008	4 episodes: "The Wedding"; "Obsession"; "Foxy on the Run"; "Fame"; 99 minutes; 1-disc set; 1.78:1 aspect ratio; English Dolby Digital 2.0; Ratings: ACB: PG
Series 1 & 2 (repackaged)	7 December 2009	2 July 2009	16 episodes; 4-disc set; 431 minutes; 1.78:1 aspect ratio; English Dolby Digital 2.0; English subtitles (hard of hearing); Ratings: ACB: PG; BBFC: 15; Special features: See individual releases
Series 3 & 4	No release	2 July 2009	16 episodes; 2-disc set; 513 minutes; 1.78:1 aspect ratio; English Dolby Digital 2.0; Ratings: ACB: PG; Special features: See individual releases
Da Kath & Kim Code (repackaged)	No release	1 April 2010	1 telemovie; 2-disc set; 164 minutes; 1.78:1 aspect ratio; English Dolby Digital 2.0; English subtitles (hard of hearing); Ratings: ACB: PG; Special features: See original release set
The Original Kath & Kim: Series 1	No release	2 August 2012	2-disc set; 202 minutes; 1.78:1 aspect ratio; English Dolby Digital 2.0; English subtitles (hard of hearing); Ratings: ACB: PG; Special features: See original release set: Repackaged version of "Series 1"
The Original Kath & Kim: Series 2	No release	2 August 2012	8 episodes; 2-disc set; 215 minutes; 1.78:1 aspect ratio; English Dolby Digital 2.0; English subtitles (hard of hearing); Ratings: ACB: PG; Special features: See original release set: Repackaged version of "Series 2"
The Original Kath & Kim: Series 3	No release	2 August 2012	8 episodes; 2-disc set; 248 minutes; 1.78:1 aspect ratio; English Dolby Digital 2.0; Ratings: ACB: PG; Special features: See original release set: Repackaged version of "Series 3"
The Original Kath & Kim: Series 4	No release	2 August 2012	8 episodes; 2-disc set; 265 minutes; 1.78:1 aspect ratio; English Dolby Digital 2.0; English subtitles (hard of hearing); English Audio Description; Ratings: ACB: PG; Special features: See original release set: Repackaged version of "Series 4"
The Best of Kath & Kim	No release	7 November 2012	8 episodes: "Wedding of the Century"; "The Wedding"; "Obsession"; "Sitting on a Pile"; "Mango Espadrille"; "Fame"; "99% Fat Free"; "The Shower"; 2-disc set; 1.78:1 aspect ratio; English Dolby Digital 2.0; Ratings: ACB: PG
Complete sets
The Hornbag Collection	No release	20 November 2008	Series 1–4; 32 episodes; 8-disc set; 1.78:1 aspect ratio; English Dolby Digital 2.0; Ratings: ACB: PG; Special features: See individual releases: Does not include Da Kath & Kim Code
The Kath & Kim Kollection	No release	1 April 2010	Series 1–4; 32 episodes; 8-disc set; 1.78:1 aspect ratio; English Dolby Digital 2.0; Ratings: ACB: PG; Special features: See individual releases: Repackaged version of "The Hornbag Collection"; Does not include Da Kath & Kim Code
Yuuuge Pack Komplete Kollection	No release	8 November 2017	Series 1–4, The Kath & Kim Code and Kath & Kimderella; 32 episodes; 10-disc set; 1.78:1 aspect ratio; English Dolby Digital 2.0; Ratings: ACB: PG; Special features: See individual releases

=== CD releases ===
A CD, titled "Kath & Kim's Party Tape", was released on 2 May 2004. It reached #17 in the Australian Albums Chart and was certified Gold (50,000+ units sold).

In 2004, Kath & Kim's Party Tape was released in Australia under the Universal record label. It features 21 tracks, including the full-length version of the show's title theme, "The Joker" (as sung by Gina Riley), as well as Diana Ross and Lionel Richie's "Endless Love" and Donna Summer's "MacArthur Park".

Track listing
1. Gina Riley – "The Joker"
2. Kath & Kim (Jane Turner and Gina Riley) – "Wine Time #1"
3. The Tubes – "Don't Touch Me There"
4. Bobby Hebb – "Sunny"
5. Kath & Kim – "Wine Time #2"
6. Diana Ross and Lionel Richie – "Endless Love"
7. Status Quo – "Roll Over Lay Down"
8. Kath & Kim – "Wine Time #3"
9. The Supremes – "Rhythm of Life"
10. Van McCoy – "The Hustle"
11. Yvonne Elliman – "If I Can't Have You"
12. Donna Summer – "MacArthur Park"
13. Kath & Kim – "Wine Time #4"
14. The Commodores – "Three Times a Lady"
15. Sérgio Mendes and Brasil '66 – "Day Tripper"
16. Kath & Kim – "Wine Time #5"
17. Yvonne Fair – "It Should Have Been Me"
18. Stephanie Mills – "Never Knew Love Like This Before"
19. Kath & Kim – "Wine Time #6"
20. Captain & Tennille – "Love Will Keep Us Together"
21. Kath & Kim – "Lady Bump"

== Spin-offs and adaptations ==
=== Feature film ===
On 9 March 2011, Turner and Riley announced plans for a movie, in which, Kath, Kim, Kel, Brett, Sharon and Epponnee would head overseas on holiday. Contracts were written to finance the film's production under the working title of The Kath & Kim Filum, with the word 'film' deliberately misspelt with the letter 'u' in typical Kath and Kim humour. However, the title Kath & Kimderella was ultimately used, and the film was released in Australia on 6 September 2012. It was directed by Ted Emery (director of the television series) and produced by Rick McKenna. The holiday scenes were shot in Positano, Italy, and filming took a total of two weeks.

The film was released in Australian cinemas on 6 September 2012. It grossed in excess of $2.1 million in its first weekend on Australian movie screens.

=== 20th anniversary special ===
In July 2022, it was reported that Kath & Kim would be returning for a 10-minute special to commentate 20 years of the series. The special showcased a countdown of celebrity guests and unseen clips that did not feature in the original series, as well as the cast discussing their favourite scenes. Celebrity guests for the special included Mason Cox, Sonia Kruger and Celia Pacquola. The two specials, Kath and Kim: Our Effluent Life and Kath and Kim: 20 Preposterous Years, aired on 20 and 21 November 2022, respectively.

=== American adaptation ===
Due to the success that Kath & Kim has achieved internationally, it was remade for American audiences by NBC. Riley and Turner served as executive producers on the American version. In this remake, actress Molly Shannon took the role of Kath Day, while Selma Blair took the role of Kim. The character of Sharon does not appear at the insistence of Szubanski.

NBC chose Jason Ensler to direct. Michelle Nader developed the series for American television, which premiered in the United States as part of the Fall schedule of 2008. The series started to shoot in California in July 2008. NBC debuted the American adaptation on 9 October 2008, while Seven started screening it to Australian viewers on 12 October 2008. After airing only two episodes, Seven dropped the sitcom from their lineup due to poor ratings, only to bring it back several weeks later as a late-night schedule filler. In America, reviews were poor, but it averaged roughly around 5 to 7 million viewers per week, and was rewarded with a full season order in October 2008. On 19 May 2009, NBC announced that there would not be a second season of Kath & Kim.
