= Brett Craig =

Character on Australian sitcom "Kath & Kim"

Brett Dean Craig
- Kath & Kim character
- Portrayed by: Peter Rowsthorn
- First appearance: 16 May 2002; Episode 1
- Last appearance: Kath & Kim: Our Effluent Life (2022)
- Created by: Jane Turner & Gina Riley
In-universe information
- Occupation: Salesman; Manager of Krispy Kreme Chadstone
- Parents: Lorraine Craig (Mother); Murry Craig (father)
- Spouse: Kim Craig (2002–2012), (2013-)
- Daughters: Epponnee Rae
- Other relatives: Kath Day-Knight (mother in law); Gary Poole (father in law); Kel Knight (stepfather-in-law)

Brett Dean Craig is a fictional character on the Australian comedy television series, Kath & Kim. He is portrayed by actor, comedian and writer Peter Rowsthorn.

== Background ==
Brett works at Computa City and is married to Kim Craig (Gina Riley) from the start of the series till the end. He lives with her and later, their daughter, Epponee Rae, in their unit; however, most of the time Kim is living with Kath Day-Knight (Jane Turner) & Kel Knight (Glenn Robbins), as they always are having problems. Brett's marriage to Kim contains no actual bond between the two; thus, causing Brett to cheat on her on multiple occasions, even with Kim's second best friend, Sharon or his manager Kelly.

At Kel and Kath's wedding, Brett is Kel's best man. Brett has a good relationship with Kim's mother Kath, and her husband Kel. To save their marriage, by the second season, Brett and Kim announce they are trying for a baby. Kim gives birth to Epponee Rae Charlene Kathleen Darlene Craig in the season finale.

Brett has a good friendship with Kim's second best friend, Sharon Strezlecki. Initially Brett was first dating Sharon before he and Kim met. Sharon has been trying to get Brett back ever since. In the fourth series, Brett sleeps with Sharon. Kim walks in and sees them. Even though Kim is married to Brett, Brett still loves Sharon. He reveals this at the very end of the fourth series. In one episode, Kath Day-Knight, Brett's mother-in-law, has a dream into the future. She dreams that Kim and Brett have divorced, and that he is married to Sharon. Sharon and Brett have triplets! Brett sometimes refers to Sharon as 'Shazz'.

Brett loves cricket and Australian rules football and would rather sit at home watching it than helping Kim pick out an outfit for his daughters first day on Neighbours.

In Da Kath & Kim Code, Brett is attracted to his boss, Kelly. He cheats on Kim; but she takes him back (as always is the case). However, despite the reunion, Brett continued the affair. Brett strives for greatness while working for Computa City (Harvey Norman) during the course of the series, however by the end he is ultimately fired and currently works at Krispy Kreme Doughnuts. In Kath & Kimderella, Brett became unemployed.

== Relationships ==
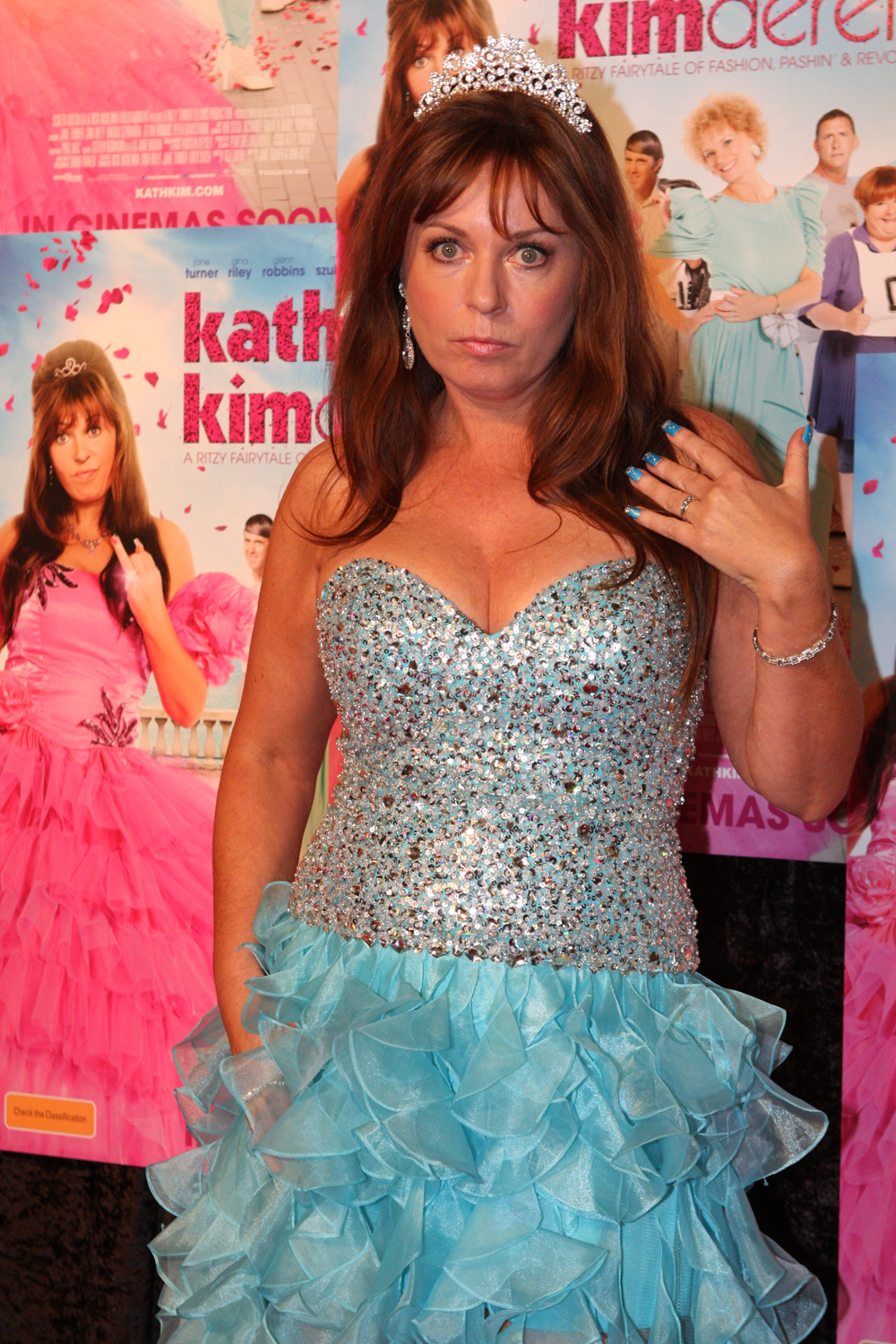
Brett's wife Kim Craig

=== Kim ===
Kim Craig – Kim is Brett's lazy and rude wife. Their relationship is dysfunctional, Brett and Kim can't agree on anything, Kim usually threatens to divorce Brett even though they have a baby in the TV series. Brett is usually seen cheating on Kim. In the "Da Kath and Kim code" Brett has to move out of the house and stay at a hotel with Kel. They first divorced in 2012. In 2013 they remarried following Kim’s divorce from Prince Julio.

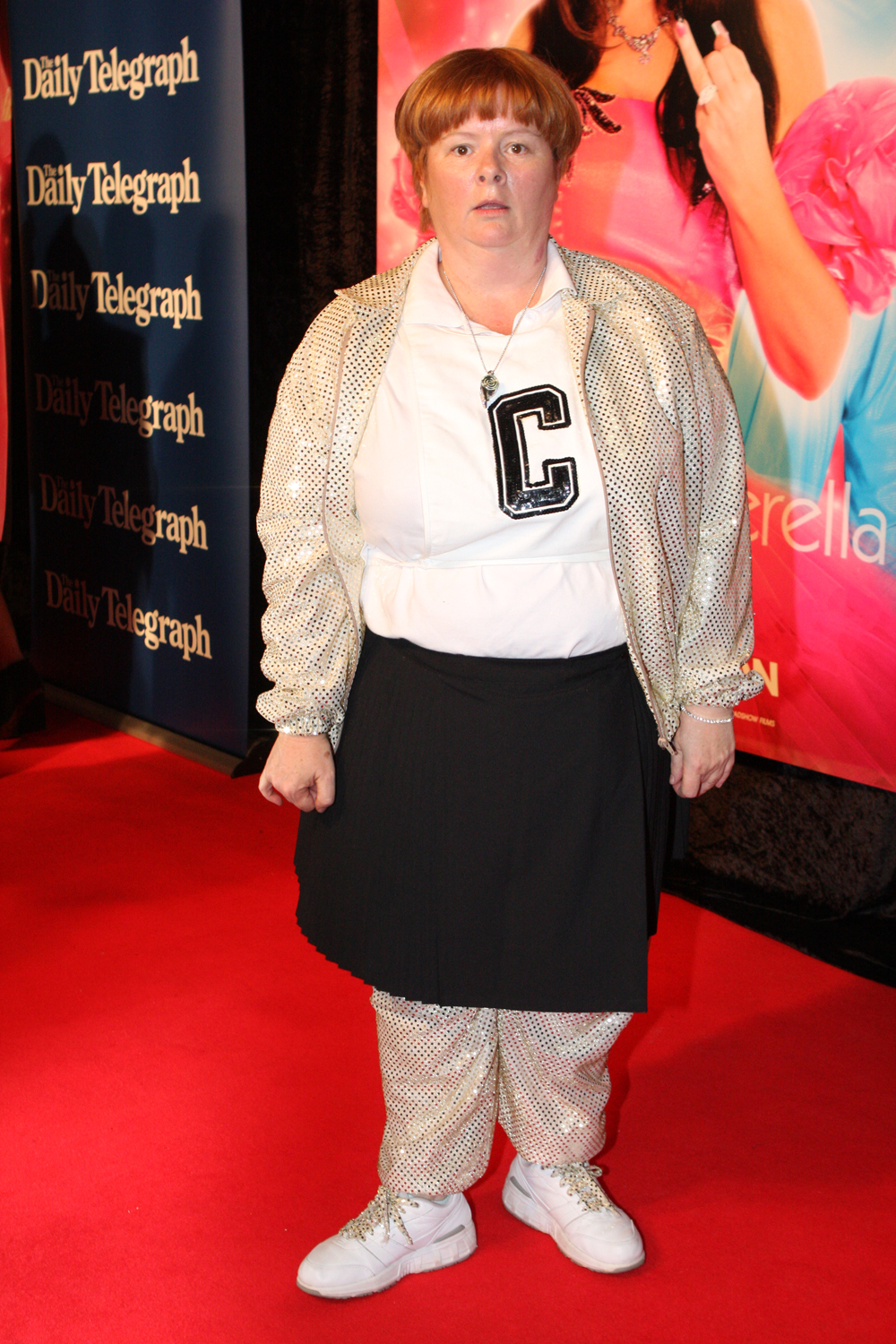
Friend and later partner Sharon Strzelecki

=== Sharon ===
Sharon Strzelecki – Sharon and Brett used to date before the series. During the episode "lust" Sharon and Brett sleep together. Sharon doesn't blame Brett for them breaking up (since every knows he can't control himself). In the future Brett and Sharon are married and seem not to care what Kim thinks about their future relationship, even though Kim hates the pair of them.

=== Kelly ===
Kelly (played by guest star Peta Brady) is Brett's demanding boss, Brett and Kelly have a sexual relationship as seen in the "Da Kath and Kim code". Brett once thought that Kelly was asking him to hangout late after work and kiss, but in fact she was telling Brett that one of his colleagues was sick and she needed help sorting out packaging DVDs.

== Recurring gags and features ==
Almost every character on the show has their own humorous features and Brett also, isn't without.

- Cujo – Brett's rottweiller, Cujo is spoilt by Brett as he shows much affection for her, even to the point where he admires her over Kim at times. He chooses to offer her food before Kim, and even cancels flight plans, because he can't stand to be without her. Cujo moves in with Kath and Kel when Brett and Kim stay at Kath's house, certainly longer than planned.
- Pants Man – Brett has cheated on Kim numerous times. The Bolton Twins (Kylie and Dannii), Kelly (Boss at Computa City), a girl from software, and Sharon.
  - Dud Root - Although he has had many sexual escapades, he is always referred to as a dud root, someone who is not very good at it.
