= Kim Craig =

- Kath & Kim character
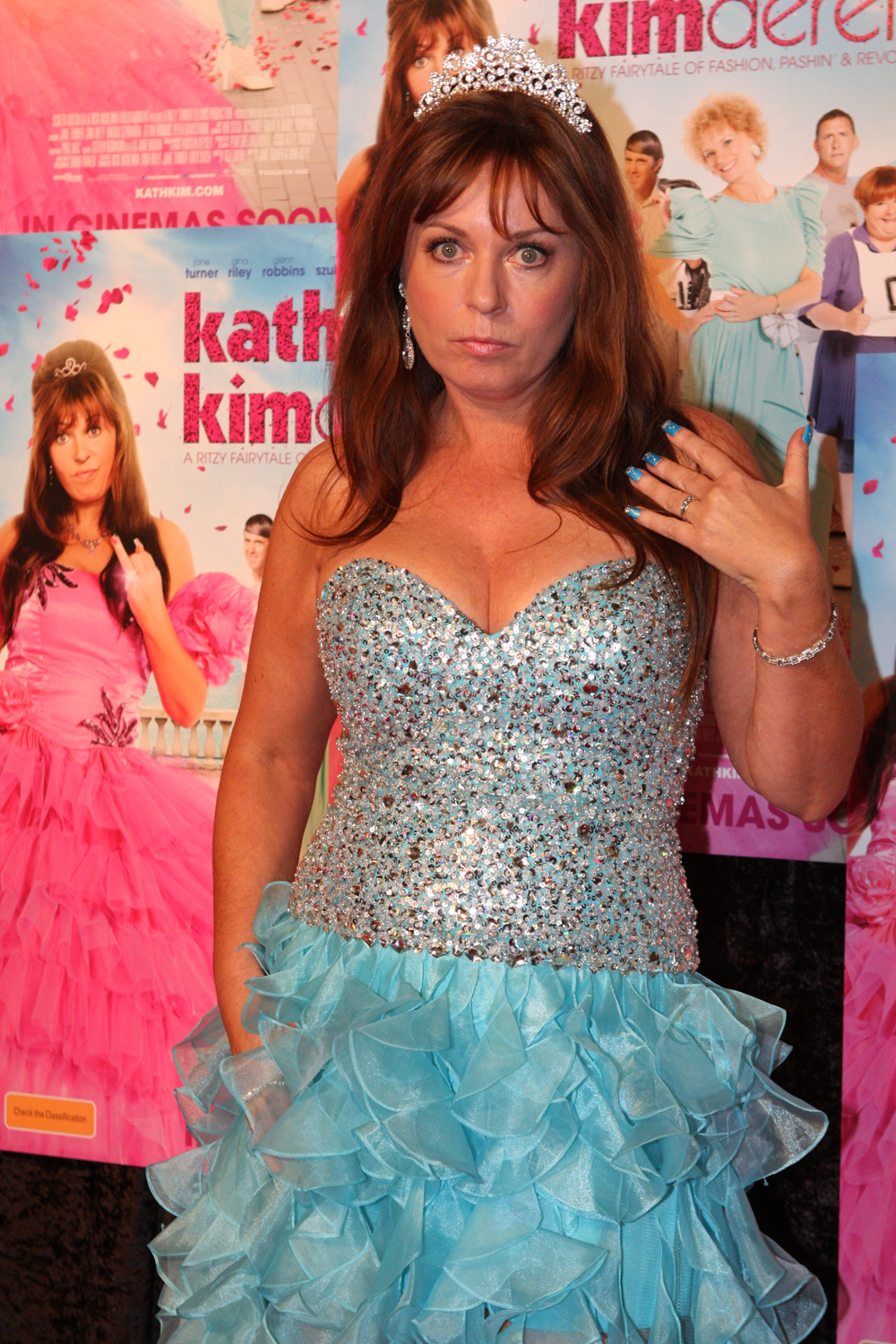
- Gina Riley as Kim Craig at the Kath & Kimderella film premiere
- First appearance: Fast Forward (1989-1994)
- Last appearance: Kath & Kim: Our Effluent Life (2022)
- Created by: Gina Riley; Jane Turner
- Portrayed by: Gina Riley; Selma Blair (US Adaptation)

In-universe information
- Full name: Kimberly Diane Craig (née Day)
- Nicknames: Kimmy (Sharon, Kath); Kimbo (Brett)
- Gender: Female
- Occupation: Stupid Girl (according to Kath); Fraudster; Unemployed; Stay At Home Mother; Trophy wife 6 months at call centre (formerly, left because of stress...theirs); 2 weeks as a Door Bitch at the Tulip Farm (series 3, formerly, "took a package, literally")
- Family: Kath Day-Knight (mother); Gary Poole (father); Kel Knight (step father)
- Spouses: Brett Craig (2002-), Prince Juleo (2012)
- Children: Eppon'ne Rae (daughter)

Kimberly Diane "Kim" Craig (née Day) is the moody, immature and accident-prone daughter in the Australian sitcom Kath & Kim, portrayed by Gina Riley. Along with co-star Jane Turner who plays Kim's onscreen mother Kath Day-Knight, Riley is the creator and writer of the series. Turner invented the character of Kim Craig during the nineties while performing on Australian sketch comedy shows such as Big Girl's Blouse.

Kath & Kim first aired on 16 May 2002, and became a hit in Australia as well as internationally. The series ended in 2007. Riley returned to screens as Kim in the film version Kath & Kimderella, which premiered in cinemas in September 2012.

== Personality ==
=== Physical appearance ===
Kim is often portrayed as lazy, rude and accident-prone. She is often seen lying down most of the time, shopping, escaping or snacking.

Kim often wears short T-shirts which allow her belly to show. Her fashion choices change frequently, at some points she wears comfortable clothing (e.g. baggy pants and a sweatshirt) and the rest of the time obsesses over herself in the mirror and talks about the latest fashion trends, which don't usually flatter her. Kim has long brown hair and a fringe and always wears make-up. Kim smokes and can be seen in the pantry of their Fountain Lakes Home, scouring it for food (usually which Sharon ends up taking and Kim reacts).

Kim is also seen reading Australian magazines such as New Idea and Famous.

=== Personal outlook ===
Kim's outlook on herself appears to occasionally vary, but she is mostly characterized as very arrogant and stuck up. Kath often calls Kim a “Stupid Girl”. She has called herself a "Yummy Mummy!" and most of the time she refers to herself as a "horn-bag" and says that people would kill to be with "this" (referring to herself). She loves to refer to herself as a "trophy wife" and has tried to use her looks to get Brett promoted on multiple occasions, calling herself "his biggest asset and secret weapon".

However at other points in Kath & Kim she appears to be very unhappy with herself and self-conscious of her weight. This attitude contrasts with that of her mother, Kath, who is happy with her outward appearance and calls herself "high maintenance". Kim remains mostly unemployed and puts in little effort in getting a job - let alone keep one, as illustrated by her constant hiring and firings from the call center. In the episode "The Moon", Kim's astrological sign is revealed to be Scorpio.

== Relationships ==
=== Brett ===
Brett, Kim's estranged husband, is played by Peter Rowsthorn. They are newly married at the start of the series and Kim leaves him after a few months, claiming her marriage is "Over! O-V-A-H!". Their relationship can be very superficial. Brett obviously loves Kim and always tries to show her affection; Kim frequently rejects him and only seems to show affection when she wants something. Brett cheats on her numerous times. However, they always reconcile. Frequently, he cancels, bans or major delays her hobbies or plans for Kim. This causes Kim to exclaim "I hate you!" or "I want a divorce!" to make Kim angry and upset.

In Da Kath & Kim Code, Brett cheats on Kim with his boss. Kim reacts badly for a few minutes but seems to not care later, accepting that her marriage was going nowhere. Brett's affair with his boss continues behind Kim's back.

Brett cheats on Kim with his 75 kilo Rottweiler Cujo in the episode "Gay", she reacts heavily and wants revenge on the Rottweiler.

When Brett cheats on Kim with Kylie & Dannii Bolton in the episode "Sport", she reacts heavily and wants revenge on the twins.

=== Kath ===
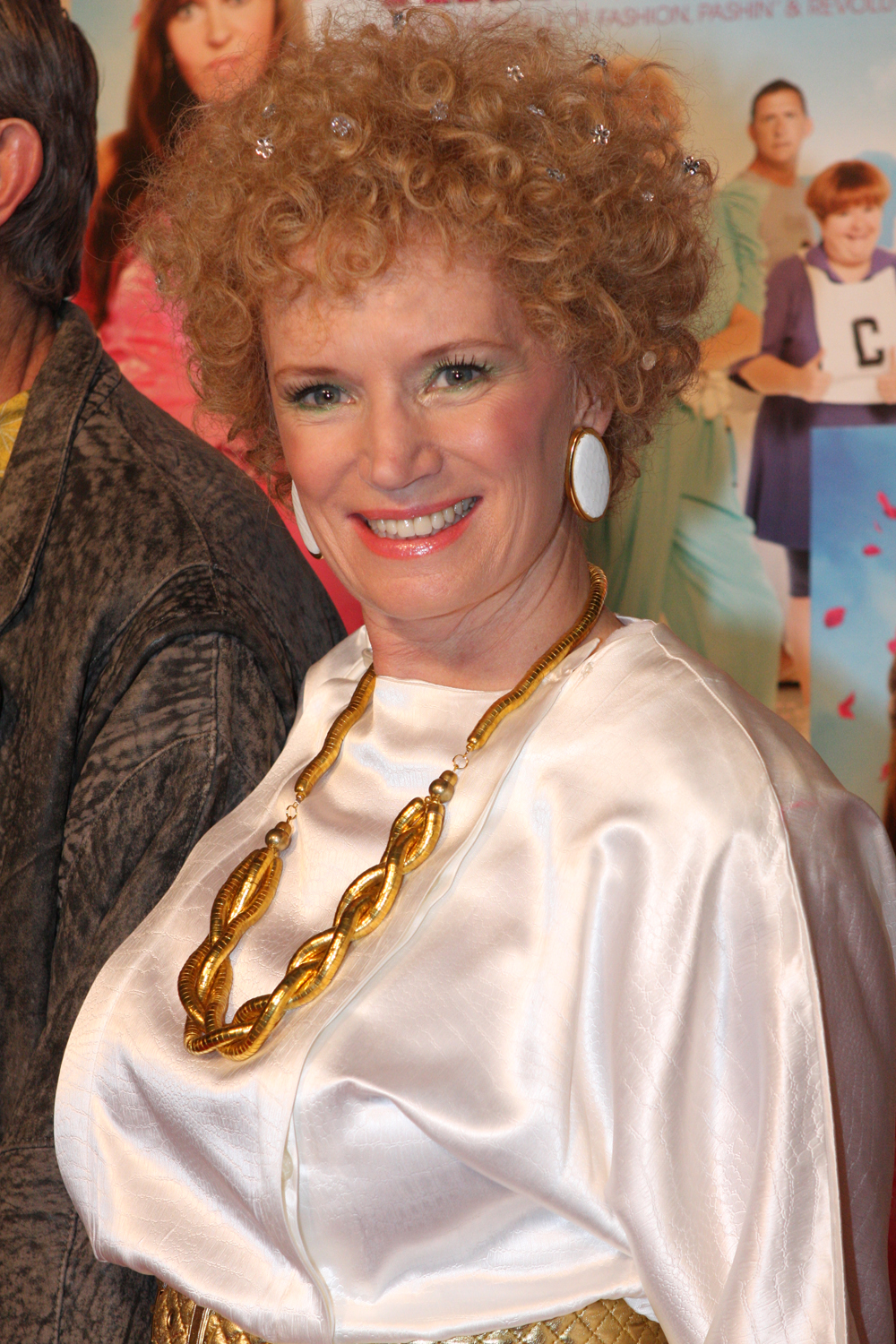
Kath Day

Kath Day-Knight, Kim's content fifty-year-old mother is played by Riley's co-star and creative Kath & Kim partner, Jane Turner. The relationship between the two is both good and bad. They often argue about various things, with Kath always referring to Kim as a "stupid girl". Growing up, Kim adopted a disrespectful attitude towards Kath, who was abandoned by Kim's father and Kath's ex-husband Gary Poole when Kim was baby. Despite this, Kim continues to take advantage of Kath. It appears she has no one else to go to besides Kath (and maybe her "second best friend", Sharon). Kim is always running back home to Kath and her new husband Kel, and lives with them by the end of the series. During the fourth season, Kim got to be such a bother to Kath and Kel that they opted to purchase their next-door-neighbour's mansion-like house, but were unsuccessful as no one auctioned to buy their own house.

=== Sharon ===
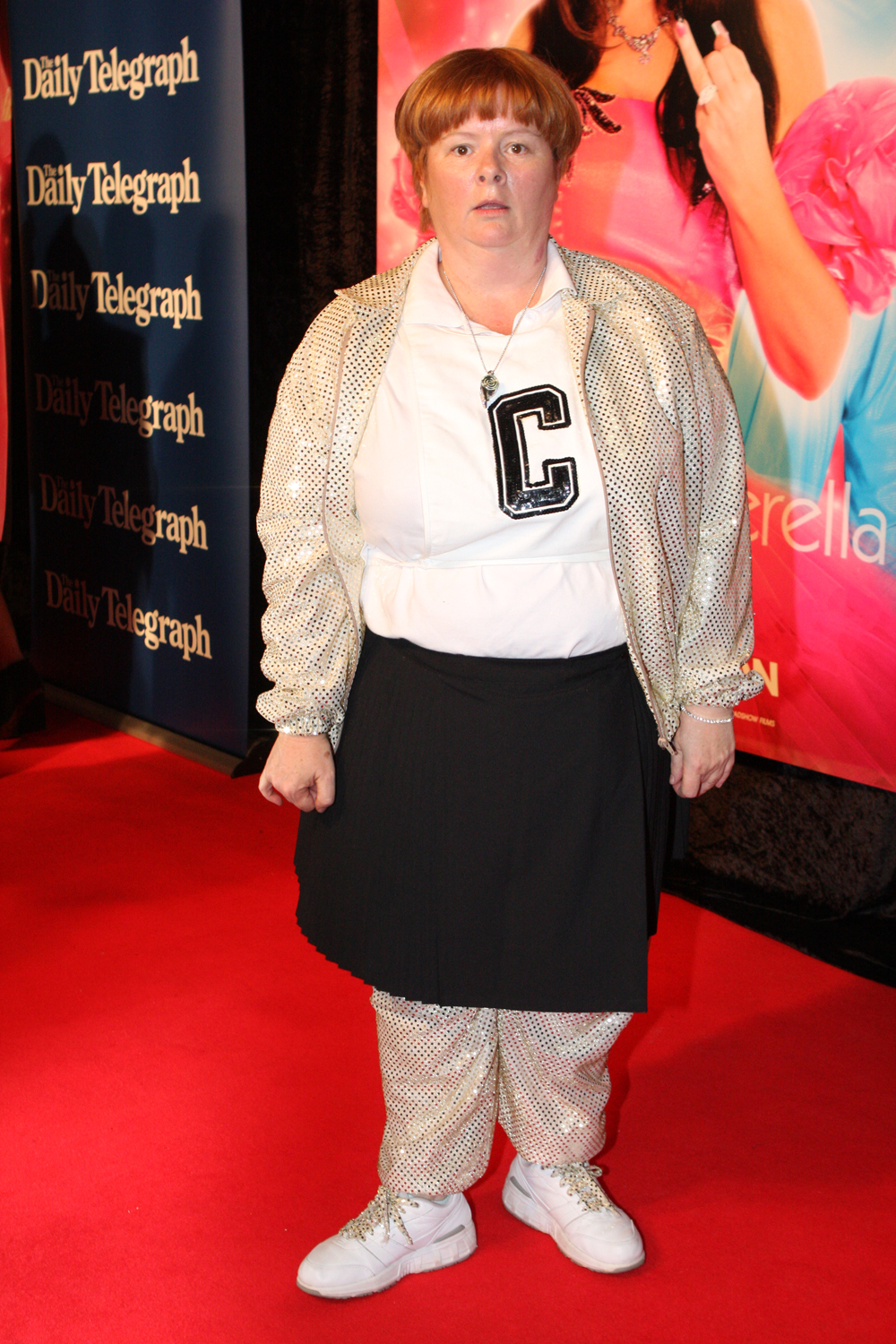
Sharon Strzelecki

Sharon Strzelecki is played by popular Australian comedy actress Magda Szubanski who had previously acted in the international film Babe. Sharon is Kim's "second best friend". (Kim claims she has another best friend, "Tina" - who is subsequently never seen during the show.) Sharon and Kim are often seen "hanging out" together.

Kim takes advantage of Sharon's friendship and willingness to do absolutely anything to help her. Kim shows little respect or affection for Sharon. When Sharon shares her desire to track down her mother in the episode "Roots", Kim laughs and retorts, "why would she want to meet you!". In the same episode, Sharon meets her overweight model sister, Karen (Matt Lucas), but Karen bonds with Kim instead of Sharon. Whenever Sharon is seen crying, Kim always makes a rude remark. For example, when Sharon finds out that her "fiancee" is really just spam on a computer in Da Kath & Kim Code, Kim says, "oh Sharon... I knew you would never get married, I just knew it." Kim is exceptionally mean to Sharon, often zeroing in on her biggest insecurities such as her desperation to find a man, her weight, or her appearance - and then exploiting them. Despite the ups and downs, the two remain in an awkward and unequal friendship. After Sharon sleeps with Brett in the Season 4 finale "Lust", Kim tells Sharon that she's dropping her to sixth best friend.

=== Kel ===
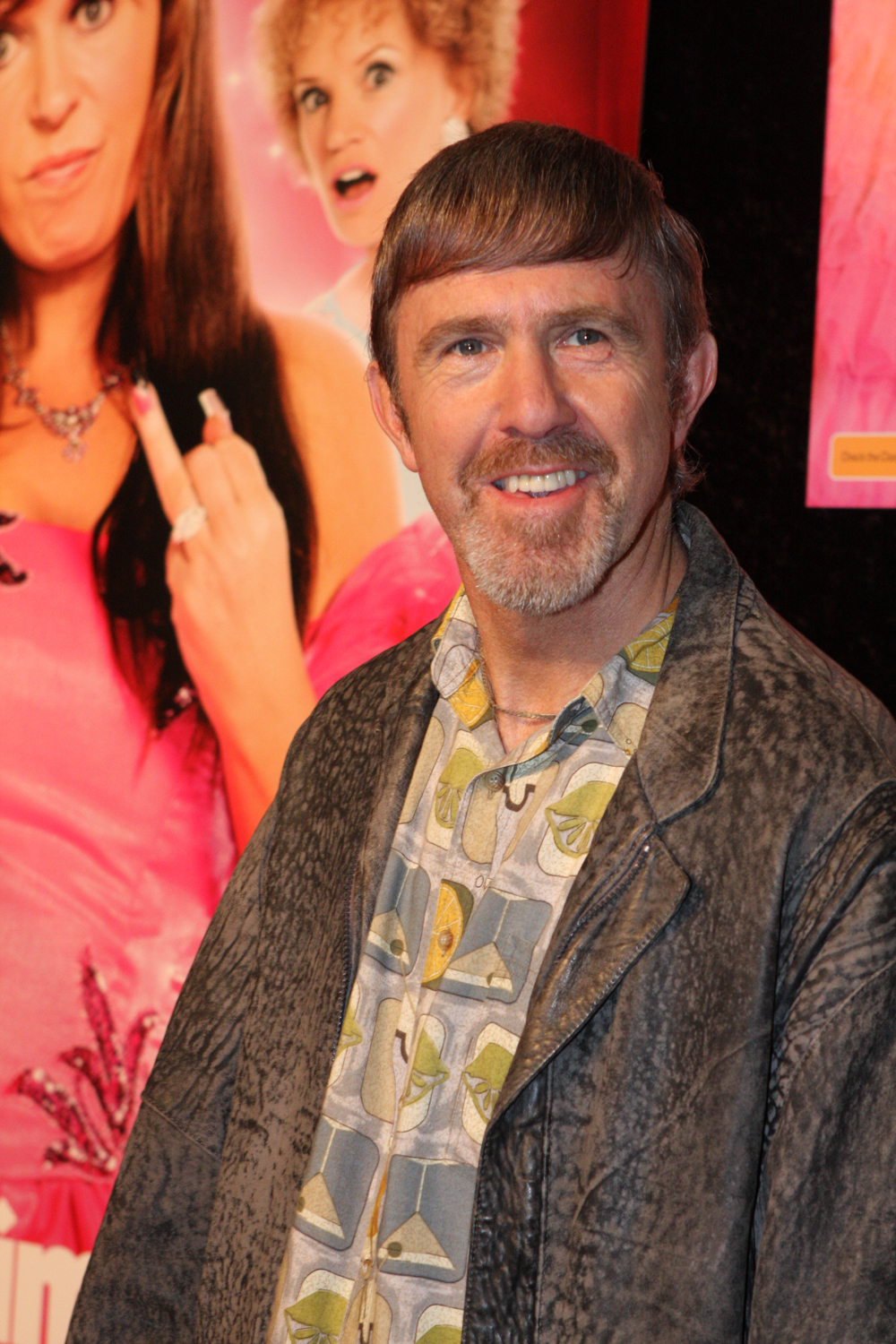
Kel Knight

Kel Knight, Kim's metrosexual stepfather, is played by Glenn Robbins. From the beginning of the series Kim has an instant dislike of Kel, perhaps because Kath & Kim had each other all of their lives without a father/husband figure in place. Kim insists that Kel is "using" Kath for manipulative reasons, however she is proven wrong. Kim and Kel rarely interact, and when they do, the mood is "off" and the scene is completely awkward - with one muttering a single word to the other, and the other either walking away or trying to put on a smile. Kel is now the focus of Kath's attention, and this annoys Kim because she likes to always be the centre of attention wherever she goes.

=== Cujo ===
Cujo is Brett's 75 kilo rottweiler. Kim has an intense dislike of Cujo and once bit her head for not getting off Kim's bed. Kim also once repeatedly tapped Cujo so she would jump off Epponnee's pram. Cujo hates Kim as well. In a Season 2 episode, Kim taps on the door and says to Cujo, "it's all right Cujo, it's just Kimmy". In response, Cujo starts barking until Brett tells her to be quiet.

== Education ==
Due to Kim's lack of commitment, she has never actually completed any of her education, most notably her high school education.

=== Fountain Lakes High ===
Kim attended Fountain Lakes High, but left in year 10 (this was not an unheard of practice until fairly recently in Australia).

=== Cake decorating course ===
She also started a cake decorating course, but didn't complete it. Kath finished her cake for her.

=== Nail design course ===
She also started a nail design course, but didn't complete it.

== Family ==
Kim shows no appreciation to her family, often slandering them for their mishaps. Kim's family with Brett is very dysfunctional. Throughout her pregnancy they face many problems, most of which are their own creation, such as issues with renovating their house. The young couple, along with their daughter Epponnee Rae, always end up moving back with Kath and Kel despite the older couple understandably wanting their space. When Kim's father Gary Poole unexpectedly returns to Melbourne after 25 years in exile in Hong Kong, Kim unwisely loans him money for "ventures", ultimately causing her and Brett to lose their marital home to repossession.

Kim tries to have Epponnee try out for the Australian Soap Neighbours, however Brett is against it - showing the couple's opposing values and life goals. During an episode which seems to take place in the future but is later revealed to be a dream, Kim and Brett have divorced, Brett has married Sharon, and Brett and Sharon have had triplets together. In that episode, Epponnee (played by Kylie Minogue for a one-off portrayal) is getting married and treats Sharon better than Kim. Elsewhere in the series, it was revealed that Brett and Sharon dated prior to Kim's relationship with Brett.

=== As a mother ===
Kim enjoys the idea of being a mother to Epponnee Rae, but does not show a lot of responsibility for her. Epponnee Ray is named after a dog (however, Kim says she'd already thought of this name and Kath "stole it"). Like most of her relationships, Kim lavishes affection on Epponnee Ray when she can be useful for something, such as Bubs Idol. On rare occasions, Kim will actually yell at the infant, telling her to stop crying so she could hear the television. Brett is seen giving more affection to their child and enjoys taking her to work, although he partially does this to help boost sales. Kath is also very good with Epponnee, taking care of her on occasions and creating a nursery for Epponnee just prior to her birth.

Kim believes that Epponnee Rae will be her ticket to a brighter future and grooms her to be a performer, despite the fact that Epponnee Rae is not even 6 months old. She manages to find Epponnee a position on the Australian Soap opera Neighbours, however the gig fails due to Epponnee vomiting on Harold Bishop.

== Quirks, personality traits and features ==
Almost every character on the show has their own humorous features and Kim also has a few notable ones. One very recurrent reference; Kim makes to her "best friend" Tina. Tina is mentioned several times by Kim, Kath, Brett and Sharon as being Kim's apparent best friend however has never been seen, and has always had problems and could never show up to Kim's important affairs.

Kim does have weight issues, and acknowledges it on some occasions. Kath usually tries to 'helpfully' point out when Kim is eating unhealthy food, which makes Kim more defensive than usual. Both Kim and Kath like to refer to themselves as "hornbags".

Kim often compares herself and her actions to those of celebrities including Melanie Griffith, Rachel Hunter, Madonna and Jennifer Aniston. When Kath says she is doing something stupid, she will respond with "is ____ stupid Mum?".

Rude comebacks aimed at Sharon are a large part of Kim's humour. Whenever there is a situation in which Sharon cries or breaks down; Kim makes it worse. An example is when Sharon cried about not having any love, Kim responds "I knew you would never get married... but the good news is I'm getting back with Brett".

Another recurring gag in the show is Kim's tumultuous relationship with Kath's new husband Kel, who tries to make an effort with her and likes to think of himself as a father figure. However, their interactions are always awkward and often interrupted.

Kim watches shows like Big Brother, Survivor, The Weakest Link and Deal or No Deal; and is often glued to the television set, choosing to reprise her duties as a couch potato rather than her duties as a mother.

== Kath & Kimderella film premiere ==
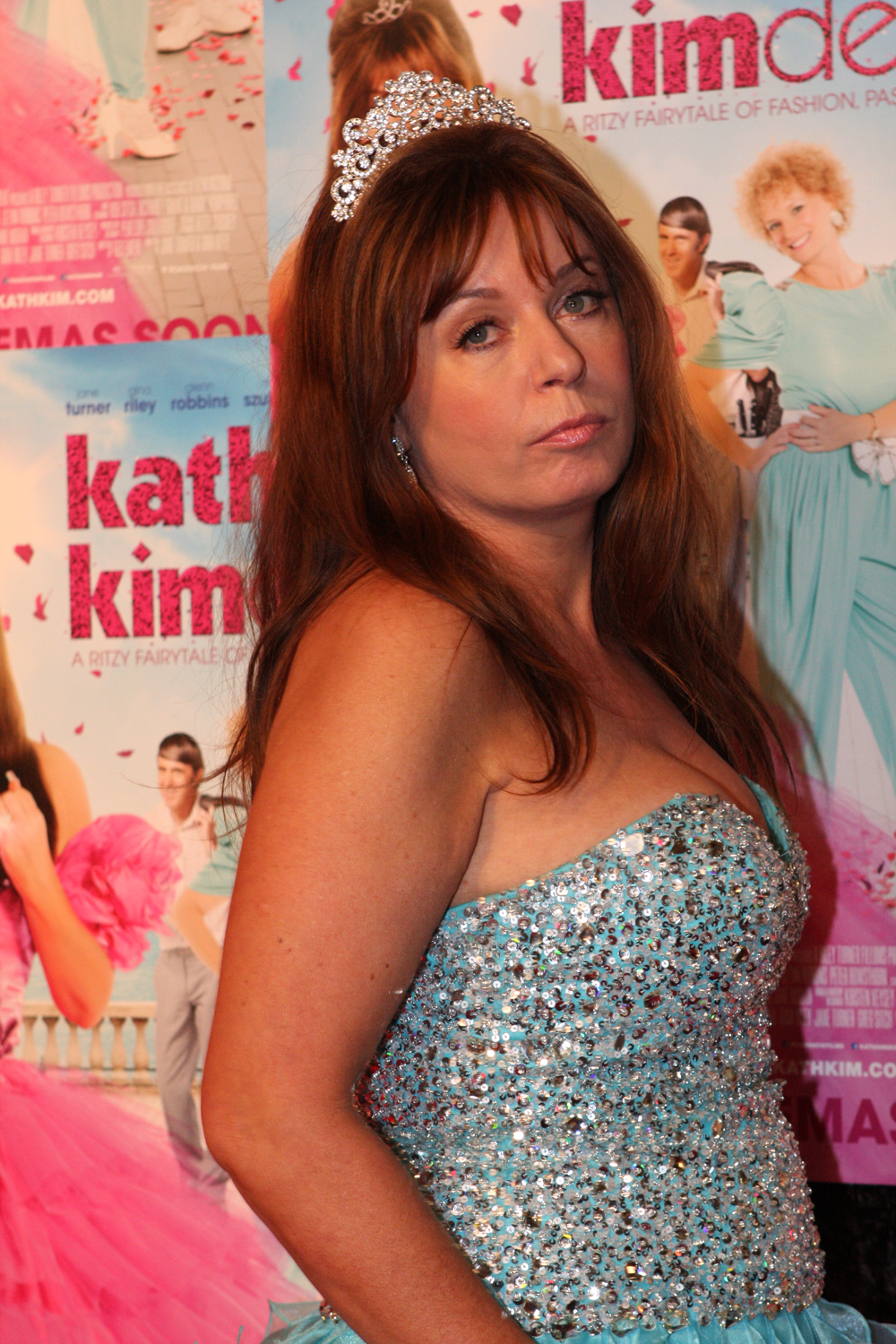

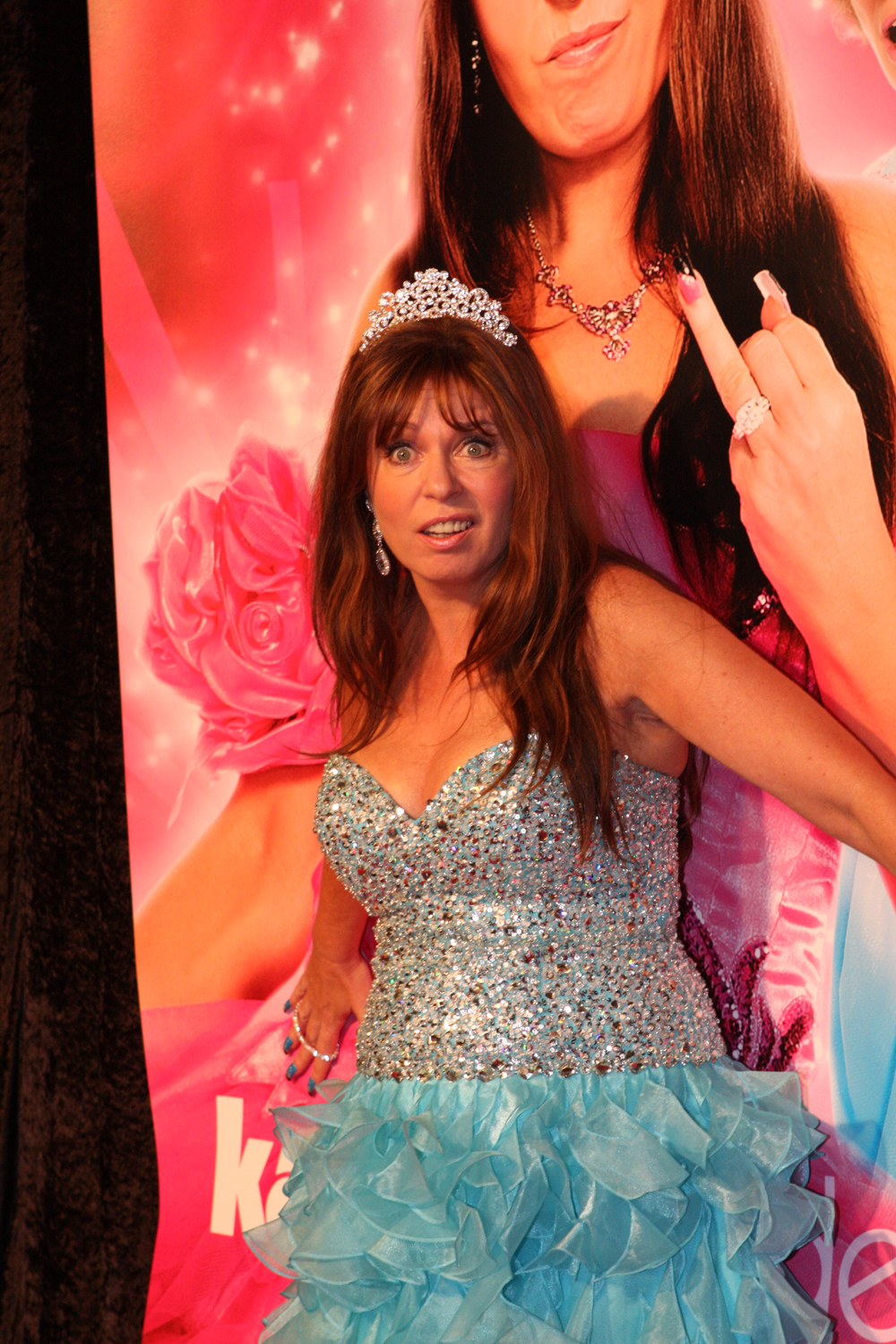

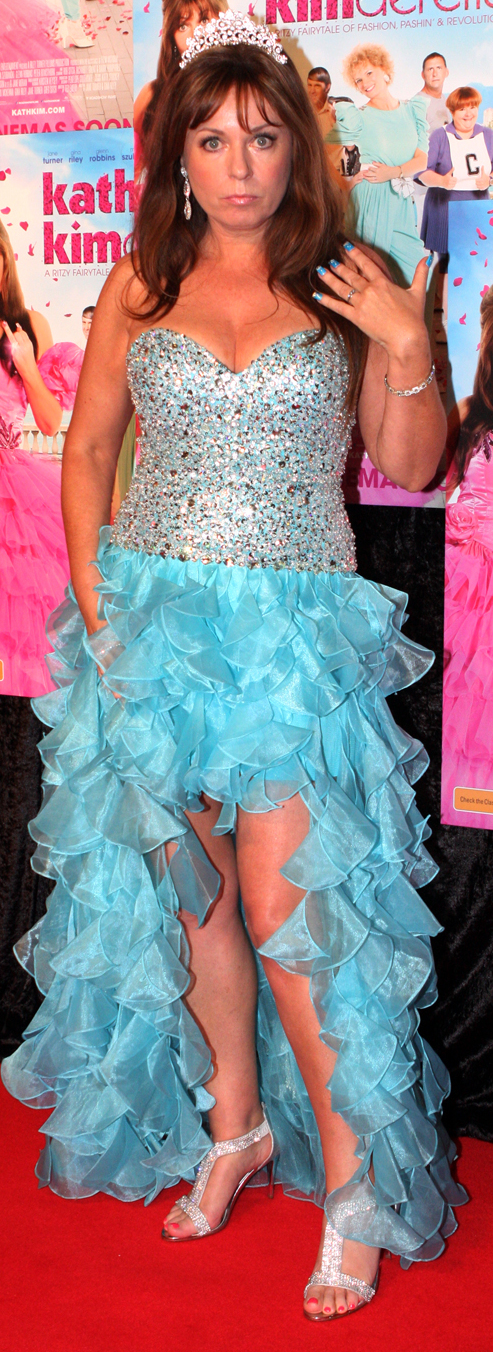

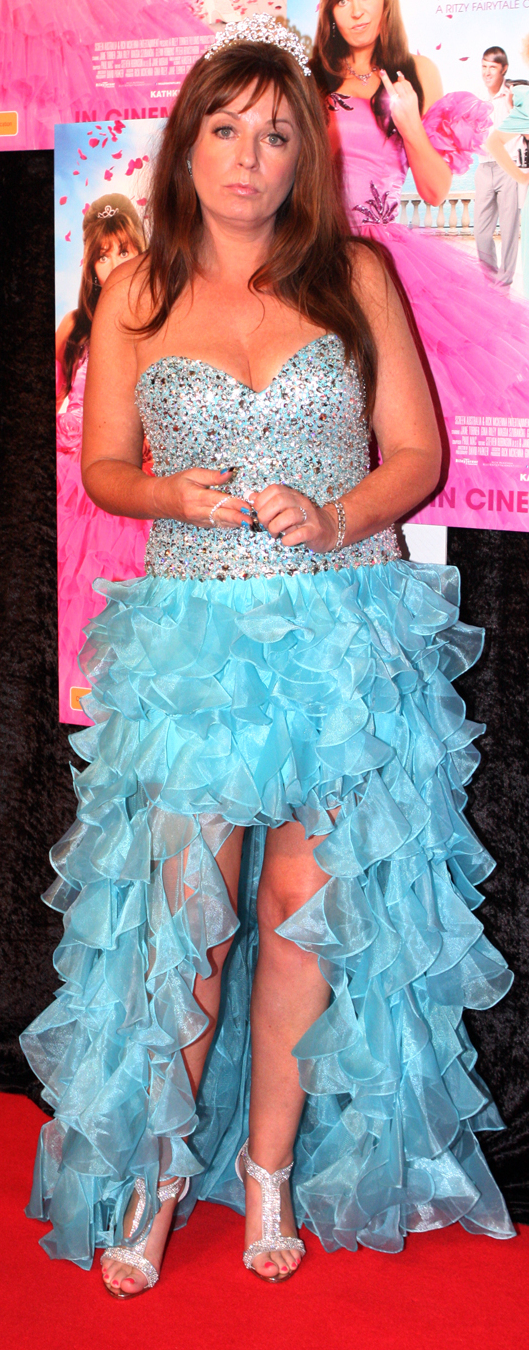

== See also ==
=== Other characters ===
- Kath Day-Knight
- Sharon Strzelecki
- Kel Knight
- Brett Craig
