= Sharon Strzelecki =

- Kath & Kim character
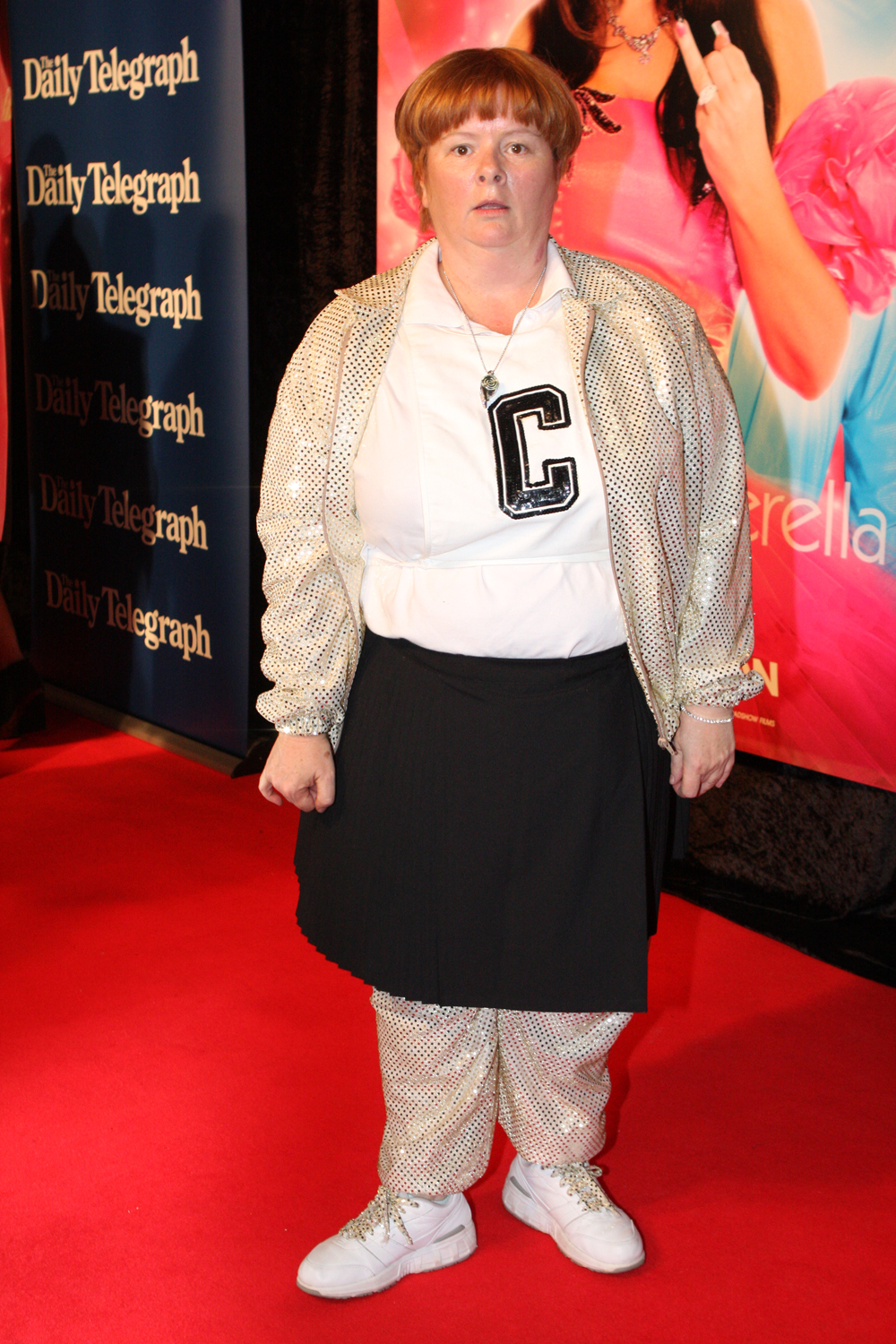
- Magda Szubanski as Sharon at the Kath & Kimderella film premiere
- First appearance: Big Girl's Blouse
- Last appearance: Kath & Kim: Our Effluent Life (2022)
- Created by: Magda Szubanski
- Portrayed by: Magda Szubanski

In-universe information
- Full name: Sharon Karen Strzelecki
- Nickname: Shazza (Brett)
- Gender: Female
- Occupation: Netball player Nurse
- Family: Karen (sister); Caroline (mother); Debbie (step-mother)
- Spouses: Wayne Shaun 2007

Sharon Karen Strzelecki (/strɛzˈlɛki/ strez-LEH-kee) is a fictional character on the Australian comedy series Kath & Kim. She is portrayed by Australian actress Magda Szubanski. The character first appeared on Big Girl's Blouse in 1994 alongside Kath Day-Knight (Jane Turner) and Kim Craig (Gina Riley). Sharon is characterized as an accident and injury-prone, sports-obsessed individual who is frequently unlucky in love and referred to as "a bit desperately lonely".

In the American version of Kath & Kim, Sharon has no equivalent. The character in the American version was initially to have the name Debbie Cox and work with animals, but Szubanski, who had created Sharon, refused to permit adaptation for the show.

== Personality ==
=== Physical appearance and personal outlook ===
Sharon is portrayed as a sports enthusiast. She displays notable skill in sports such as netball and cricket. Sharon has distinctive orange-brown hair in a bob. In most episodes, she is shown wearing her netball cardigan with a white or pastel T-shirt.

Sharon is characterized by her lack of confidence, often appearing with her head down and showing signs of low self-esteem or depression. However, she also exhibits moments of happiness and cheerfulness, particularly when playing netball. She is portrayed as a kind and caring individual, consistently placing the needs of others above her own, despite often receiving little love or care in return.

In Kath & Kimderella, Sharon embarks on the "Orlando Bloom diet" and experiences significant weight loss. This storyline reflects real-life events, as actress Magda Szubanski had undergone weight loss with the Jenny Craig program during the show's hiatus. Sharon's love for KFC is highlighted in Da Kath & Kim Code.

"I've never thought that the gag of Sharon is the weight. I've always said the thing that defines Sharon is netball. What I based her on was those kind of people who, on a cold, wet Saturday morning, get up and they get the bibs and the balls and they teach junior netball and don't get paid for it but they have that sense of civic duty." – Magda Szubanski

=== Hobbies ===
Sharon is deeply passionate about sports. Sports uniforms make up almost the entirety of her wardrobe. She is particularly active in netball, where she serves as team captain of the Sapphires and, in one instance, the Unicorns (featured in Season 2, "My Boyfriend"). Sharon is also skilled in indoor cricket and has played the sport in four different Australian states. Additionally, she has golfed and competed in shot put at the national level, often referencing these achievements in the series.

Beyond participating in sports, Sharon enjoys watching football, cricket, and rugby. Her love of food is a recurring theme, often leading her to raid the snack supply at the Day household. This behavior frequently causes conflict with Kim, who scolds Sharon for "stealing" her snacks. In one episode, Sharon becomes distraught when the snacks Kim wins in a competition are eaten.

Sharon also shows an interest in the lives of Kim and, occasionally, Kath, often aiding Kim in her peculiar and self-centered schemes without hesitation. Her unwavering loyalty to her friends is a central element of the character.

== Relationships ==
=== Love life and romantic relationships ===
Sharon is notable for her tumultuous and often unsuccessful love life. Throughout the series, Sharon comes close to forming relationships, but each attempt ends in failure.

In Da Kath & Kim Code, Sharon nearly marries a supposed fiancé named "Marriat," only to reveal that he was merely spam from a website. Sharon has a complicated history with Kim's husband, Brett, having had brief romantic entanglements with him both before and after his marriage to Kim.

Mark (Tony Martin), another of Sharon's romantic interests, is an ex-boyfriend with whom she has an inconsistent relationship. While Mark occasionally expresses affection for Sharon, he often appears disinterested, and their relationship is challenged when Sharon nearly loses him to a "leggy Riverdancer." Sharon also shows interest in Kel's friend, Sandy Freckle, known for pursuing Kel's former partners. However, Sandy's attention is focused on Kath rather than Sharon.

Sharon has had a romantic connection with a hospital co-worker, Alan (Alan Brough), though this relationship never becomes serious, however, Sharon enlists Kim to give her a makeover for her coffee date with Alan. Her struggles in love are depicted in the episode "Lust," where it is revealed that Sharon turns to chocolate to cope with her romantic disappointments.

Sharon has a short lived romance with a jockey, Damien (Jane Turner), whom she met while at the Melbourne Cup. The two make out in the porter-loos, and Sharon later tells Kim that she was going out with him again after inviting herself. Damien is later seen watching Sharon's eventual wedding to Wayne Shaun.

Sharon's fictional love life also extends to comedic portrayals of celebrity encounters. She is shown to have "pashed" (Australian slang for passionate kissing) and "married" cricketeer Shane Warne. Additionally, in character as Sharon, she shared a "pash" with Heath Ledger on the red carpet at the AFI Awards in 2006 while performing as an assistant stage manager.

=== Kim ===
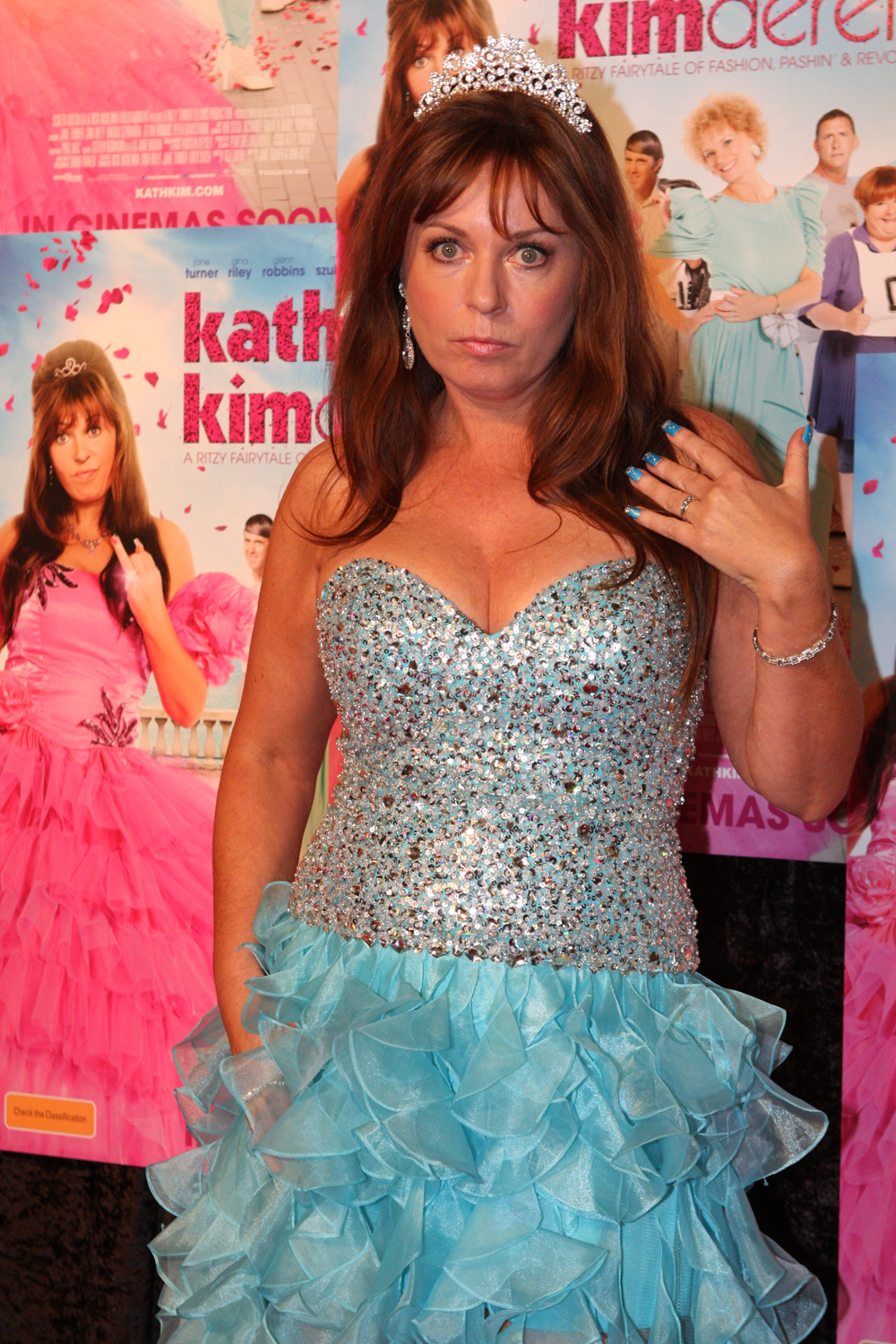

Sharon and Kim share a complex and often one-sided friendship. While Sharon consistently demonstrates loyalty and kindness toward Kim and her family, Kim regards Sharon as her "second-best friend". This dynamic is highlighted by Kim's tendency to treat Sharon dismissively unless she wants something from her, often beginning requests with phrases like, "Sharon, because you are my second-best friend..."

Kim frequently belittles Sharon, mocking her for being "good-for-nothing" and pointing out her lack of success in love. Despite this, Sharon remains a supportive friend, willing to help Kim in various situations.

Sharon consistently looks up to Kim as a person in personality and looks, and often agrees with her when she says that she is pretty and stylish. Sharon often asks Kim for advice on how to get a boyfriend, and says "I wish I could be just like you" (referring to Kim).

Kim's ambivalence toward Sharon's close friendship with Brett, her husband, causes tension to their relationship. Sharon and Brett share a strong platonic bond, which causes Kim to often be jealous or dismissive of their camaraderie.

Kim takes advantage of Sharon's accommodating nature, frequently enlisting her to run errands or drive her and her daughter, Epponnee-Rae, to various locations, even when Sharon has other obligations.

=== Brett ===
Brett Craig, often called "Bretty" by Sharon, is Kim's husband and a close friend of Sharon. In the episode where Epponnee-Rae, Brett and Kim's daughter, is born, it is revealed that Sharon and Brett dated during high school. Brett ended their relationship when he became interested in Kim, despite her initial lack of interest or affection toward him.

In one episode, Sharon expresses a desire to have a child on her own using a donor. She subtly hints at wanting Brett to be the father, stating, "I want a person who is the husband of a close friend... and has a baby like Epponnee-Rae, to be the father."

The dynamic becomes more complicated in the final season when Sharon and Brett have a one-night stand, a moment that Kim discovers. Despite this revelation, their actions do not significantly alter the relationships within the group, other than Kim demoting Sharon to her "sixth-best friend."

=== Kath Day-Knight ===
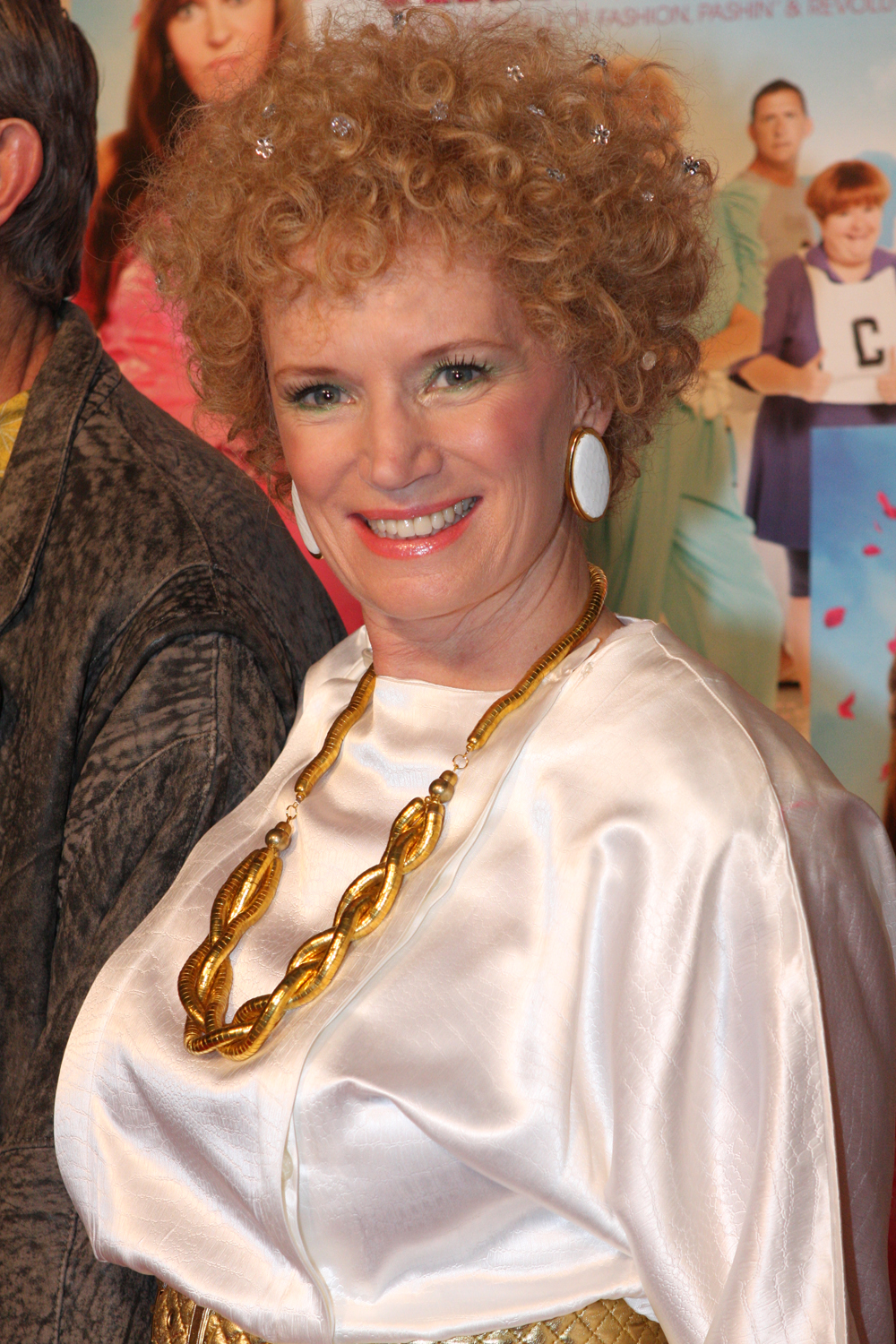
Kath Day-Knight

Sharon and Kath maintain a positive relationship, with Kath often acting as Sharon's advocate when Kim mistreats her. Kim's tantrums directed at Sharon frequently revolve around trivial matters, such as disputes over food, and Kath typically steps in to defend Sharon during these episodes.

Instances of tension between Kath and Sharon are rare. Notable exceptions include the episode "Party," in which Kath becomes upset with Sharon after her drink is spiked, and an occasion where Kath firmly advises Sharon to "get help" before a volleyball game.

=== Wayne Shaun ===
Wayne Shaun (Shane Warne) is a Shane Warne impersonator who becomes Sharon's husband in the final episode.

Sharon and Wayne's relationship appears to have several difficulties. At the end of the finale, Sharon enters Kath's home visibly upset, revealing that Wayne had purchased a mobile phone, a decision that seemed to trouble her. The fate of their marriage is left uncertain, though the credits scene shows Wayne in a spa with Kath and Kim, discussing strategies to win Sharon back.

== Family ==
=== Parents ===
Little is consistently known about Sharon's parents, as the storyline surrounding her family contains notable discrepancies.

Regarding Sharon's father, she mentions in one episode that he "moved with his new family to Tewantin". In another episode, Sharon arrives at Kath and Kel's home after losing her job and apartment, explaining that her father, who owned the property, returned to renovate and raise the rent, forcing her out.

In Series 1, during the episode "Hen's Night," Sharon explains that she struggled to properly organize Kim's hen night due to the need to care for her ill mother, who, according to Kim, had a "dicky pancreas." Sharon defends her mother, stating that she was in a coma at the time and therefore unable to call with congratulations.

In Series 4, Sharon claims her birth mother abandoned her as a baby and moved to Great Britain, never making contact again. Sharon also reveals the existence of a younger half-sister, Karen (Matt Lucas), who was born to her mother after remarrying in Britain.

=== Karen ===
Karen is Sharon's half-sister. She appears in two episodes, most notably in the episode "Roots," where Sharon embarks on a mission to reconnect with her birth mother but instead discovers the existence of Karen. Karen, portrayed by Matt Lucas, is a plus-sized model who travels frequently and happens to be in Australia for modeling work when Sharon contacts her.

When Sharon and Kim meet Karen, Sharon is largely ignored as Karen quickly forms a bond with Kim, spending all her time with her instead. Before departing, Karen forcibly kisses Brett, an action to which neither Kim nor Sharon reacts.

Karen makes another appearance in the series finale, "Wedding of the Century", though not in person. Before Sharon's marriage to Wayne, Sharon plays a video message from Karen, who declines to attend the wedding. In the message, Karen relays that their mother hates her. Karen also claims she was treated like a "princess" by their mother, growing up with everything she ever wanted.

== Quirks, personality traits and features ==
Sharon is known for several recurring behaviors and traits.

One of Sharon's common habits involves Kath's refrigerator. She often enters the Day-Knight residence through the sliding door and immediately raids the fridge, eating whatever she finds, typically frankfurts. She also has a penchant for finishing Kim's snacks, such as Dippity Bix or fat-free Fruche. This often leads to a predictable exchange where Kim exclaims, "Sharon! That was my last ___!" Sharon defensively responds, "Well, I didn't know, Kim!" to which Kim concludes, "Well, you never bloody know, Sharon!"

Sharon is frequently depicted with various injuries and physical ailments. She is often seen wearing a cast, splint, neck brace, or eye patch, or showing signs of "pash rash" (as Kim refers to it), boils, or carbuncles. Many of her injuries are attributed to her enthusiastic participation in sports, though some have other origins. Notably, a grotesque dermatological affliction on her face is revealed to be the result of a monkey bite sustained during a trip to Bali. She has also broken her fibula five times. She also states on multiple occasions that she is allergic to alcohol and marshmallows.

A devoted cricket fan, Sharon idolizes Shane Warne. She is frequently shown reading Warne's books and attempting his signature move, "the flipper." In Season 4, her admiration takes center stage when she marries a Shane Warne look-alike. On the morning of her wedding, she is seen holding two photographs of Warne—one from his younger years and one from later in his career—both of which resemble her fiancé.

Another recurring gag involves Sharon's kissing scenes. After she kisses someone, red marks often appear around her mouth, and she is left grinning.

== In other media ==
Magda Szubanski has reprised her role as Sharon on several occasions outside the series.

In 2005, Szubanski appeared as Sharon in a televised fundraiser supporting victims of the 2004 Indian Ocean tsunami.

In 2019, Szubanski appeared as Sharon on an interview for the breakfast television show Today where she meets a group of fans that named a netball team after her. She has a band aid on her face, claiming to be an injury of a cat scratch.

In 2019–2020, she featured in a series of advertisements for Uber Eats alongside Kim Kardashian.

In 2020, Szubanski again portrayed Sharon in a tribute video dedicated to health workers during the COVID-19 pandemic.

In 2022, Szubanski featured in an advertisement for the new Google Pixel collection, appearing in scenes at a restaurant, on the netball court and in a park.

In 2025, Szubanski again portrayed Sharon in an advertisement for Google Ads, where she ran a company by the name of 'Bowled & Beautiful', specialising in giving a Bowl Cut to all those who enter. She also features as Sharon in an instructional video on how to use Google Ads.

In the same year, Szubanski portrayed Sharon in a series of advertisements for Medibank, in which mental health conversations with family are encouraged by depicting two previously unseen children of Sharon, Tim and Pam.

== See also ==
- Strzelecki (disambiguation)

=== Other characters ===
- Kim Craig
- Kath Day-Knight
- Kel Knight
- Brett Craig
