= Da Kath & Kim Code =

2005 Australian TV movie

- Genre: Comedy
- Created by: Jane Turner; Gina Riley
- Written by: Jane Turner; Gina Riley
- Directed by: Ted Emery
- Starring: Gina Riley; Jane Turner; Glenn Robbins; Peter Rowsthorn
- Composer: Jeremy Smith
- Country of origin: Australia
- Original language: English

Production
- Executive producers: Gina Riley; Jane Turner; Rick McKenna
- Producers: Jane Turner; Gina Riley; Rick McKenna
- Editor: Steven Robinson
- Running time: 90 minutes
- Production company: Riley Turner Productions

Original release
- Network: ABC
- Release: 27 November 2005

Da Kath & Kim Code is a 2005 Australian comedy telemovie of the television series Kath & Kim.

After three seasons of Kath & Kim (2002–2004), Gina Riley and Jane Turner initially planned to take 2005 off from television. But in July, they announced that they would be writing and filming a 90-minute telemovie. The telemovie screened in Australia and New Zealand in November and December 2005 respectively. The telemovie was sold to networks in the United Kingdom and the United States. It was the last Kath & Kim production to be shown on the ABC before it moved to the Seven Network for the 2007 season. The plot is a parody of the 2003 popular novel The Da Vinci Code by Dan Brown.

== Plot ==
Kel and Kath return from The Da Vinci Code European tour and begin frantic preparations for Christmas. During the two weeks leading up to Christmas Day Kim discovers that Brett is once again having an affair, this time with his boss Kelly. Brett stays at "The Buckingham Motel". Kim eventually asks him back, but he is still conducting the affair. Sharon meets a man, Marriat, online and they become engaged. She is heartbroken to later learn that he does not actually exist, but is just a blog. Kath and Kel become backup dancers for Michael Bublé at Carols by Candlelight, Melbourne. Kath's affection for him results in Kel letting out his "green eyed monster", with Kel punching Bublé in the middle of the performance. She tells him that he shouldn't bother going home as he wouldn't be welcome. Kel too goes to stay at "The Buckingham". Kath forgives Kel and he returns home for Christmas. Kath and Kel also receive strange messages from John Monk (Barry Humphries), the albino running Da Vinci Code tour, including one saying "44 Euros". John Monk visits their home. Kel thinks he has cracked the code and Monk is going to kill them, but he just wants to offer them a franchise. An epilogue shows Kath's first day as a tour guide on the Da Vinci Code 2 tour: G'day Leonardo.

== Cast and characters ==
=== Main ===
- Jane Turner as Kath Day-Knight
- Gina Riley as Kim Craig
- Magda Szubanski as Sharon Strzelecki
- Glenn Robbins as Kel Knight
- Peter Rowsthorn as Brett Craig
- Barry Humphries as John Monk (special guest)
- Peta Brady as Kelly
- Heather Mitchell as Heather

=== Special guests ===
Michael Bublé, Rove McManus, Rhonda Burchmore and The Wiggles appeared as themselves.

== Ratings ==
The movie aired on 27 November 2005, and was the ABC's top rated program for 2005, achieving an average audience of 2.1 million and a peak audience of 2.4 million.

== DVD release ==
Da Kath & Kim Code was released to DVD as a 2-disc set on 1 December 2005, and was bundled with Kath & Kim Live in London. The DVD was briefly discontinued and repackaged again on 1 April 2010.

== Awards and nominations ==
Year	Award	Category	Recipients and nominees	Result
2006	Logies	Most Popular Actor at the Logies	Glenn Robbins	Nominated
2006	Logies	Most Outstanding Miniseries / Telemovie at the Logies		Nominated
