= Kel Knight =

Fictional character on the television show Kath & Kim

- Kath & Kim character
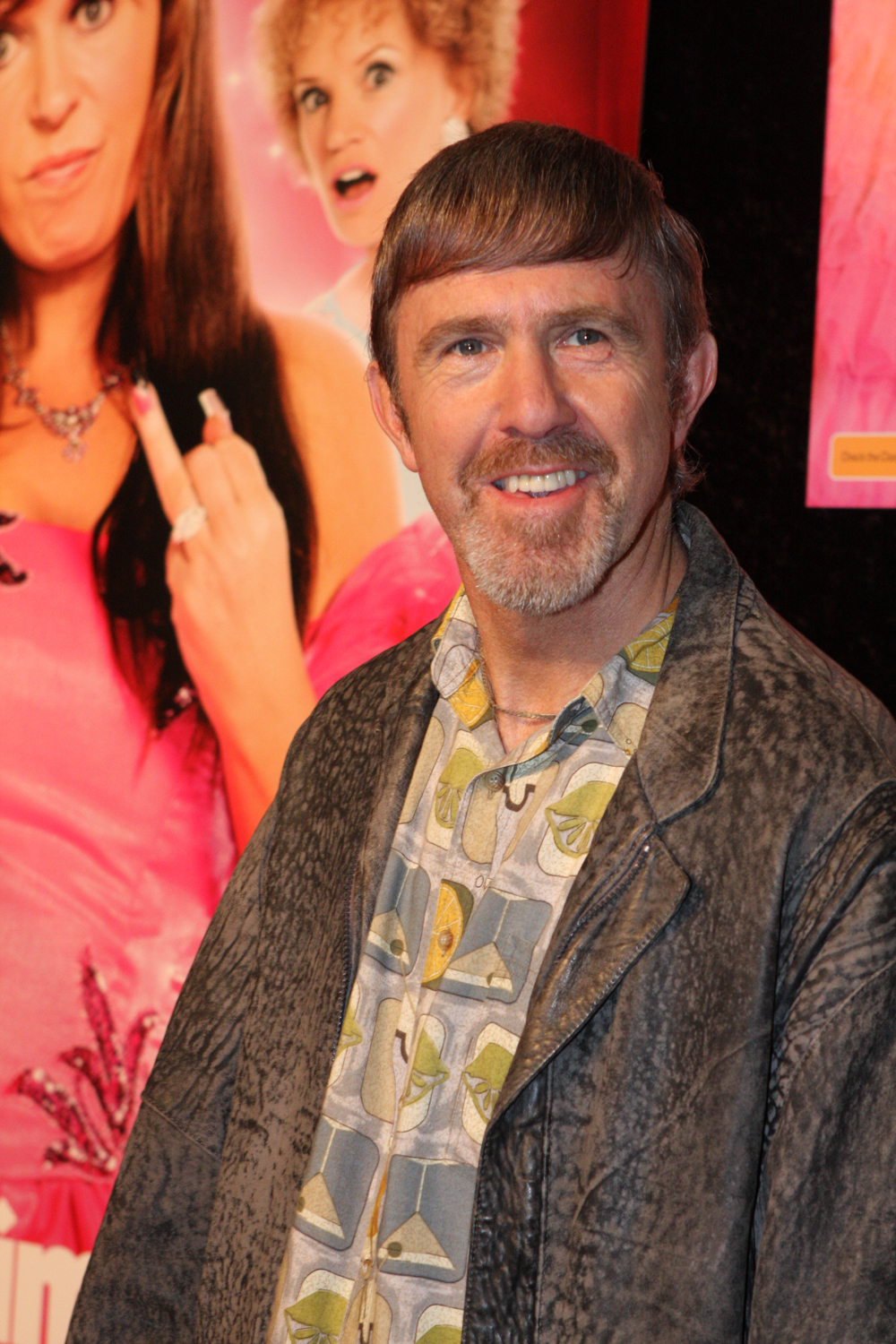
- Glenn Robbins as Kel Knight at the Kath & Kimderella film premiere
- First appearance: 16 May 2002; Episode 1
- Last appearance: Kath & Kim: Our Effluent Life (2022)
- Created by: Gina Riley; Jane Turner
- Portrayed by: Glenn Robbins

In-universe information
- Full name: Kelvin Graham Knight
- Gender: Male
- Occupation: Butcher; Purveyor of Fine Meats
- Family: Brett Craig (step son-in-law); Epponnee Rae (step granddaughter); Beryl Aniston (mother); Jennifer Aniston (cousin)
- Spouses: Kath Day-Knight (2002—2003 annulled; 2004—present)
- Children: Kim Craig (step daughter)
- Nationality: Australian

Kelvin "Kel" Graham Knight is a fictional character in the Australian television show Kath & Kim. He is the husband of Kath Day-Knight and is a passionate "purveyor of fine meats". He is portrayed by the comic actor Glenn Robbins.

John Michael Higgins portrayed his equivalent (Philip "Phil" Lesley Knight) in the U.S. version of Kath & Kim, and his portrayal was highly criticized.

== Personality ==
Kel comes across as an honest, respectable, reliable man who finds out he has many talents throughout the episodes.

=== Physical appearance and personal outlook ===
Kel takes pride in maintaining himself, although not to Kath's extent. He has greased-down hair and wears pants which are too high for his body, often showing his socks. He exercises often, enjoying power walks and using the home gym.

=== Hobbies ===
Kel's main hobby is probably his job. He takes great pride in his butcher shop at Fountain Gate Shopping Centre and also loves to cook. Together with Kath, Kel loves to exercise and do aerobics. He is a Sydney Swans supporter, much to the annoyance of Kath who supports Richmond Tigers. He is somewhat sexually ambiguous and is seen as a metrosexual. During series four he wins Fountain Gate retailer of the year and starts coming home early from work and putting up posters around his workshop to show he won, which proves that Kel is extremely passionate about butchering. Kel also didn't show up to work one time after beating up Eric Bana; this is the only time Kel has been seen slacking off work.

=== Background ===
Kel is four months younger than Kath. He was very reluctant on the day of their (first invalid) marriage. Kel had previously had four of his past girlfriends/fiancées taken away from him, feeling he was unlucky in love and became drunk on the wedding day. He has always been a gourmet butcher. In season 1, episode 2 "Gay" it is revealed Kel is bisexual, and has had past experiences with men in the Navy. It is speculated very lightly that Kel might have possibly acted again on his bisexuality again in the episode before the wedding when Kath wonders how he managed to get the carriage for the wedding from the man who offered himself to Kath for the carriage, in which Kel replies with "Let's just say I did what was necessary".

=== Struggles in Kath & Kimderella ===
During the film Kel is seen having a fear of flying, after a session with former marriage counsellor Marion his phobia is cured.

== Relationships ==
=== Kath ===
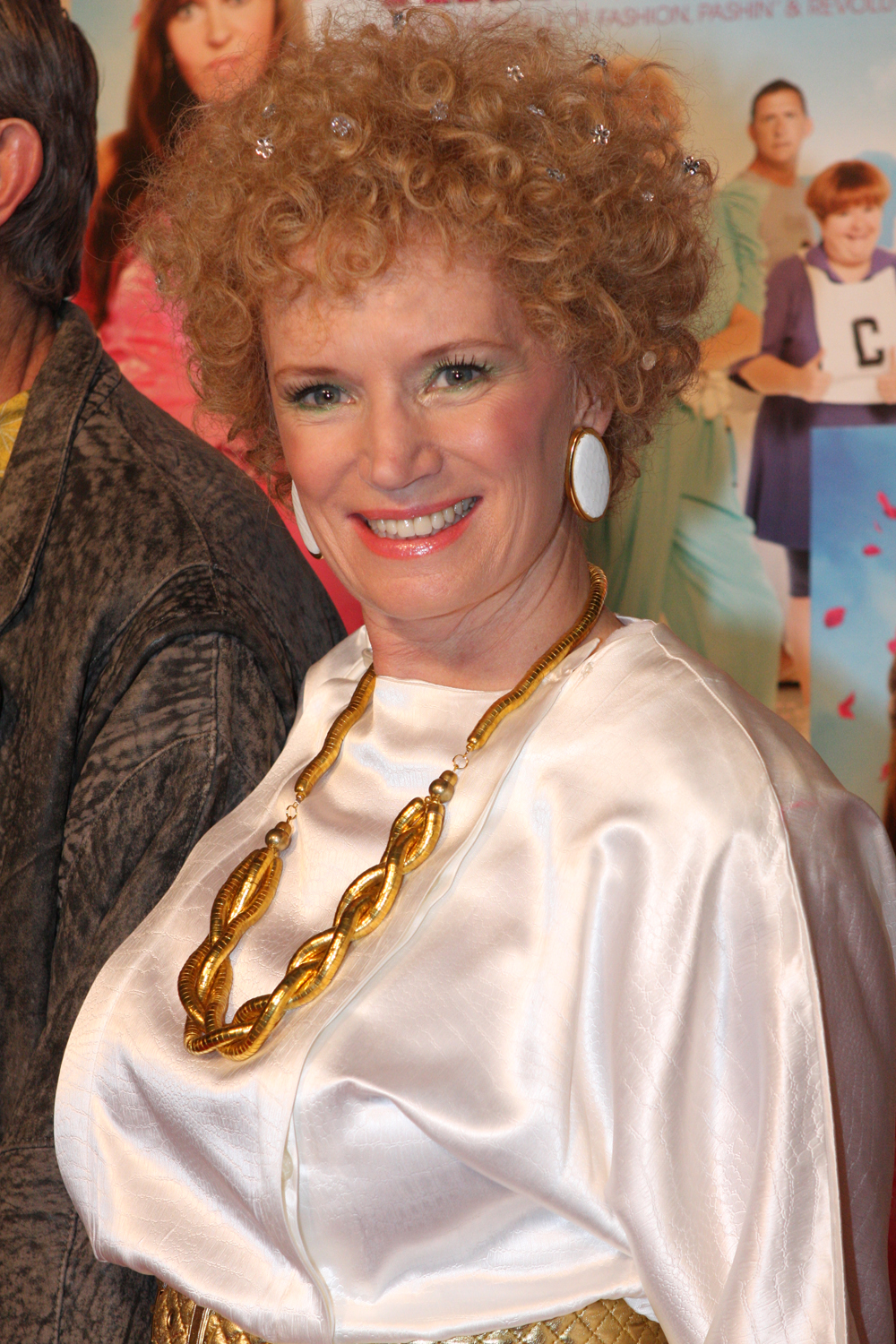
Kath Day-Knight

Kel's relationship with Kath is very good. They have odd traditions including their work-out time, which includes awkward stretching and power walking. The relationship has had limited difficulties on various occasions where Kath's ex-husband Gary Poole showed up and revealed that the marriage (Kath & Kel) was invalid as he and Kath were, in fact, still married since the 1970s. Also, Kath being older than Kel has created worry for herself. Kel likes to take over Kath's duties sometimes (as seen in "Inside Out") which annoys her; as she likes to be kept busy and be in charge.

=== Kim ===
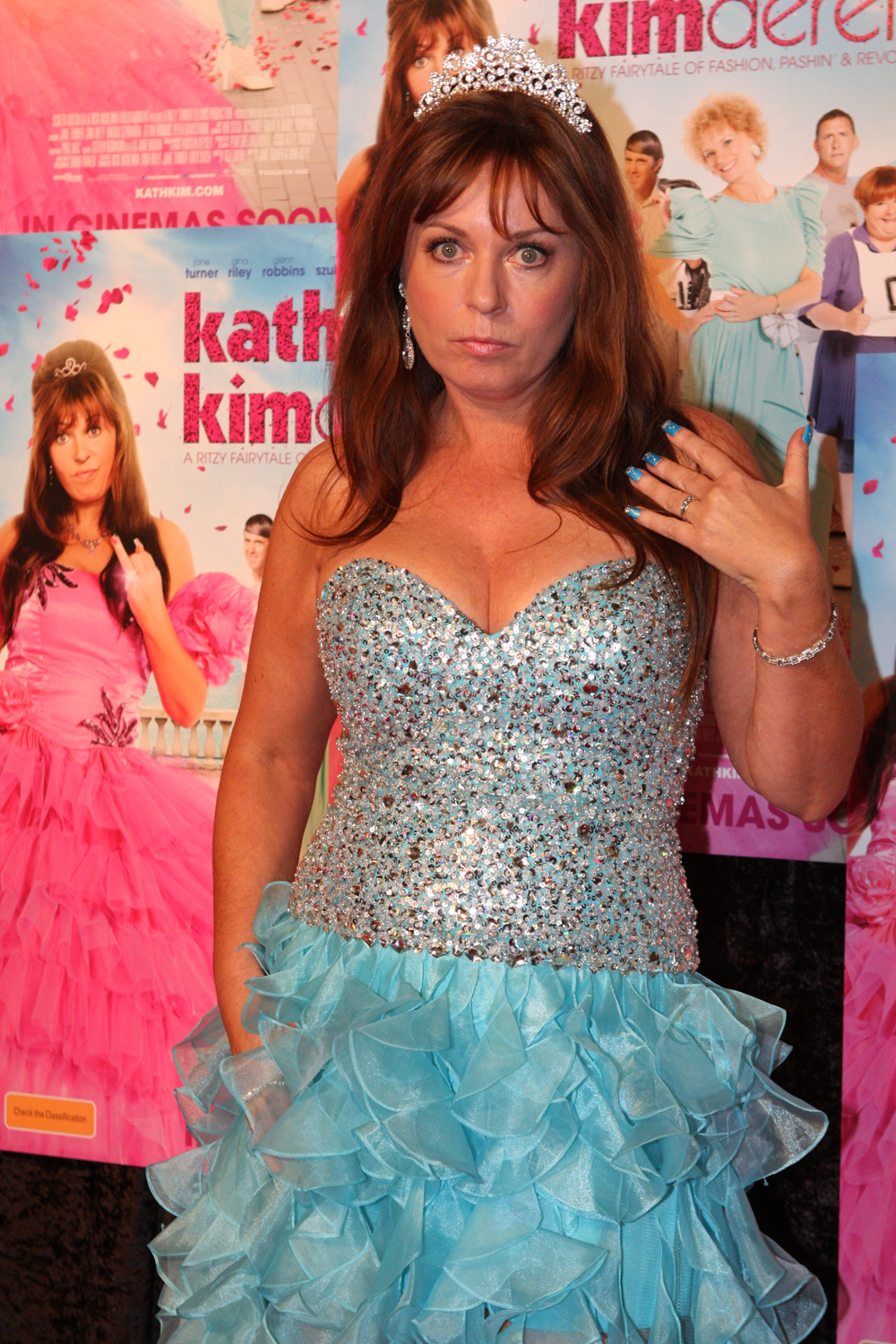
Kim Craig

Kim Craig, Kel's step-daughter and Kath's daughter, is played by Gina Riley. From the beginning of the series, Kim had an instant dislike of Kel, due to the fact that Kath & Kim had each other all of their lives without a father/husband figure in place. Kim and Kel rarely interact, and when they do, the mood goes "off" and the scene is completely awkward, with one muttering a single word to the other and the other either walking away or trying to give out a grin. Kel is now the focus of Kath's attention which annoys Kim who likes to always be the centre of attention. Kel often tries to express his opinion of Kim to Kath, who does not always agree with what is said.

=== Sharon ===
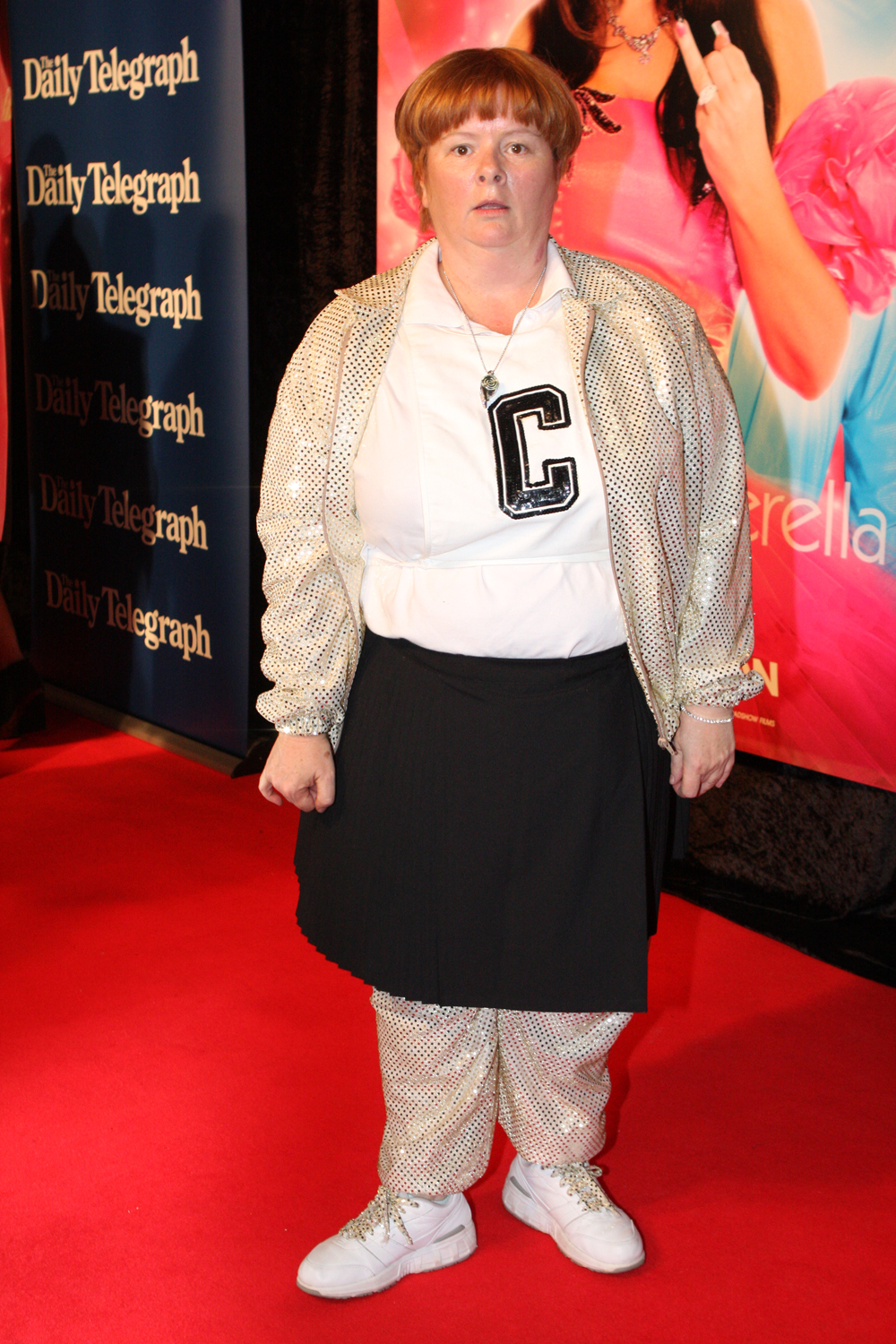
Sharon Strzelecki

Sharon Strzelecki, played by Magda Szubanski shows respect towards Kel throughout the entire series. She is first introduced to Kel when Kath introduces the two. They don't usually talk. A mutual respect seems to exist between these characters however, with Kel having referred to Sharon as a "good stick".

=== Brett ===
Brett, Kel's step son-in-law and Kel's best man at the wedding, is played by Peter Rowsthorn. Brett is usually the one who gets informed about Kath and Kel's sexual activities.

=== Romantic life ===
Before Kel met Kath, he had a bad history with women. Every person he came close to marrying was always snatched away from him by longtime friend Sandy Freckle, which raised doubt to his mind before his marriage to Kath.

== Information ==
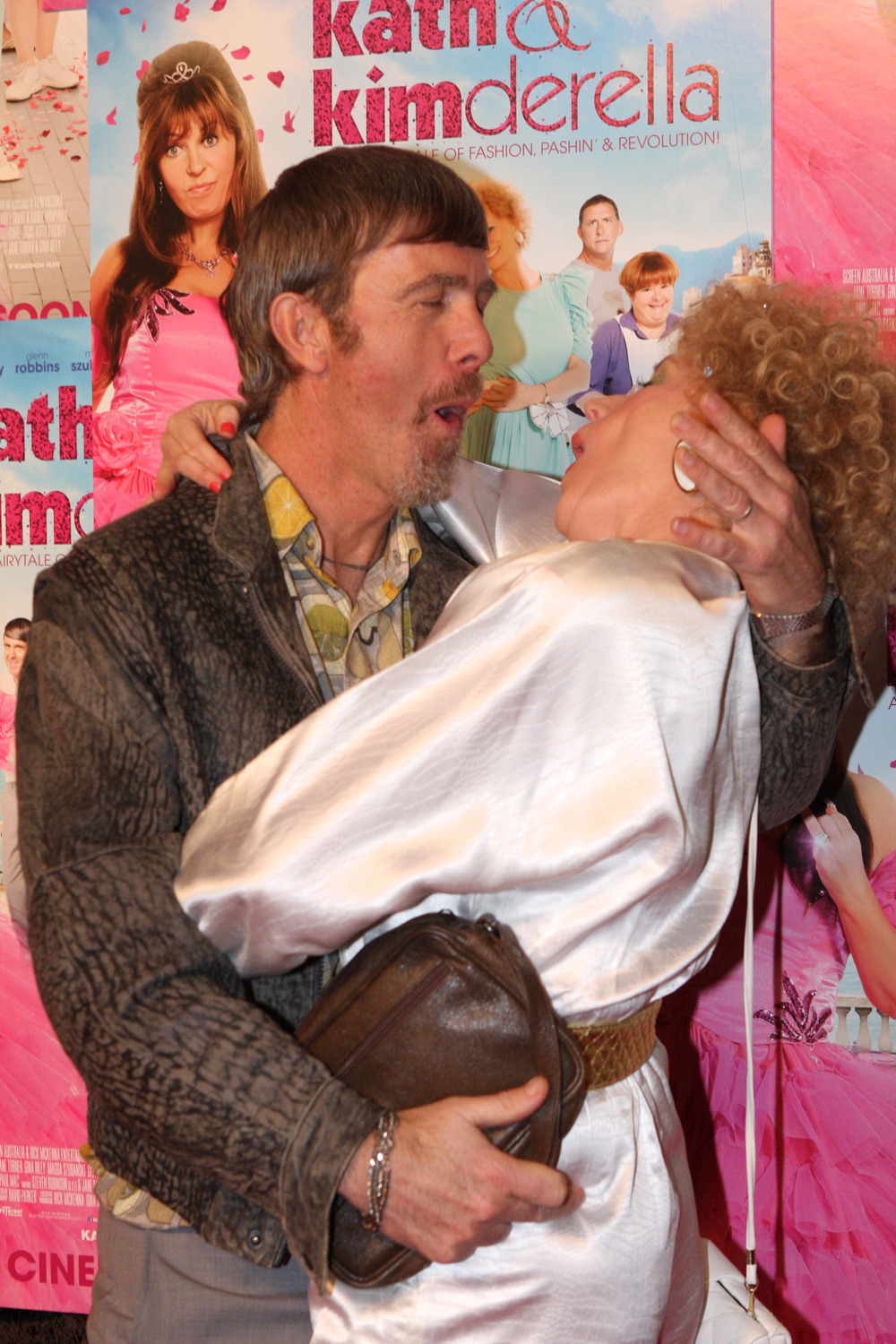
Kath and Kel kissing

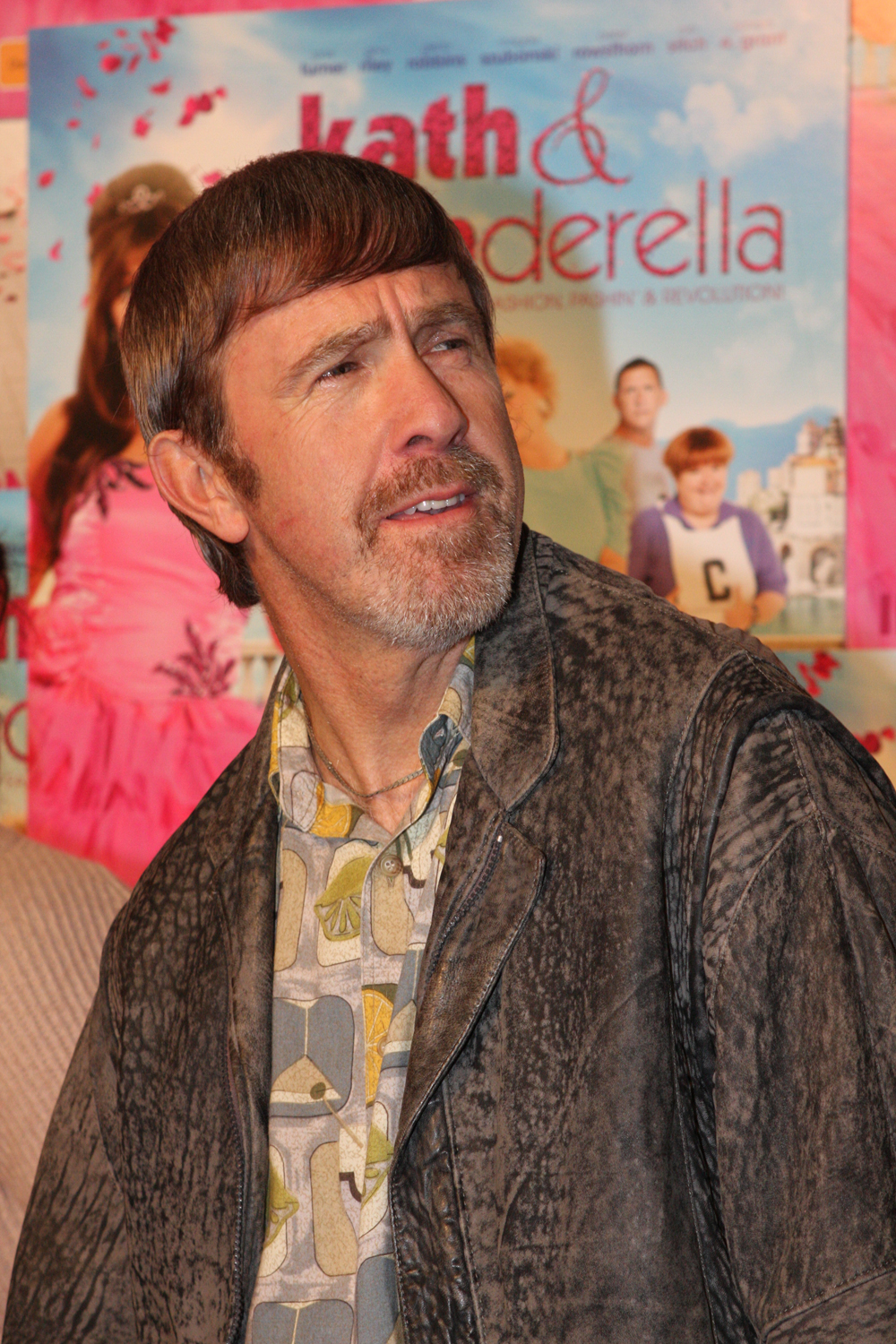
Kel's hair

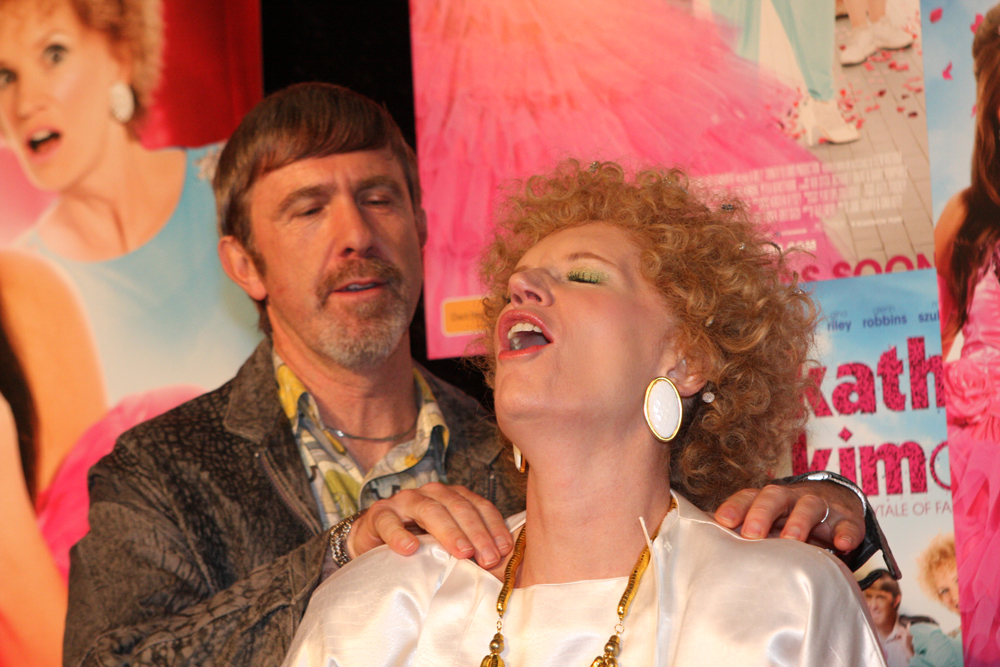
Kel massaging Kath

=== Short story lines ===
Throughout the series, Kel's storylines include taking over as the lady of the house which annoys Kath, the lead up to his marriage to Kath, entering a midlife crisis and having 'mock angina' leading to a 99% fat free obsession. In "Da Kath & Kim Code", Kel develops a strong dislike of Michael Bublé, as Kath has a crush on him and Kel does not approve. Kel is a Sydney Swans supporter in the Australian Football League, something Kath was not aware of until they were married.

=== Quirks, personality traits and features ===
Kel wears a combover hairstyle kept in place with Brylcreem and is never without one of his manbags. Kel is often seen wearing a pair of shorts, way above the kneeline, when he is powerwalking. One of Kel's many interests is books and he seems to have a soft spot for the South African author Bryce Courtenay. This is evident in many episodes. For example, in episode 3, failing to make communication with the other butchers at a meat retreat, he pulls out the book The Power of One. In episode 4, he mentions the author twice: Kath is reading the Anti Candida diet book, and Kel mentions Bryce Courtenay, although Courtenay did not actually write the book (far from his genre). Later on, Kel complains of Kath participating in the musical The Hours. Kath recommends he joins the play, which he does, due to them having busy schedules, looking for some time to spend together. Kath explains to Kel that it was a book/movie adaptation to which Kel responds, "That was that Bryce Courtenay book, wasn't it?". However, Bryce did not write this book either. In series 4, when Kath, Kim, Kel and Brett were playing Trivial Pursuit, Kath asked Kel who wrote Captain Underpants and he replied Bryce Courtenay.

=== Physical appearance ===
Kel has greased down hair in every episode, held in place with Brylcreem.

Kel is seen wearing a vinyl coat: during the TV series he is seen wearing coats purchased from Mens Land, which is mentioned by Kel in the "Da Kath & Kim Code".

Kel is seen with a man bag made out of pleather during the TV series. When Kath and Kel are going on their honeymoon, Kel asks if his man bags can fit in Kath's bag; however, Kath tells Kel he needs only one, which proves that Kel is extremely metrosexual and has an intensive fondness for man bags.

=== Smart car ===
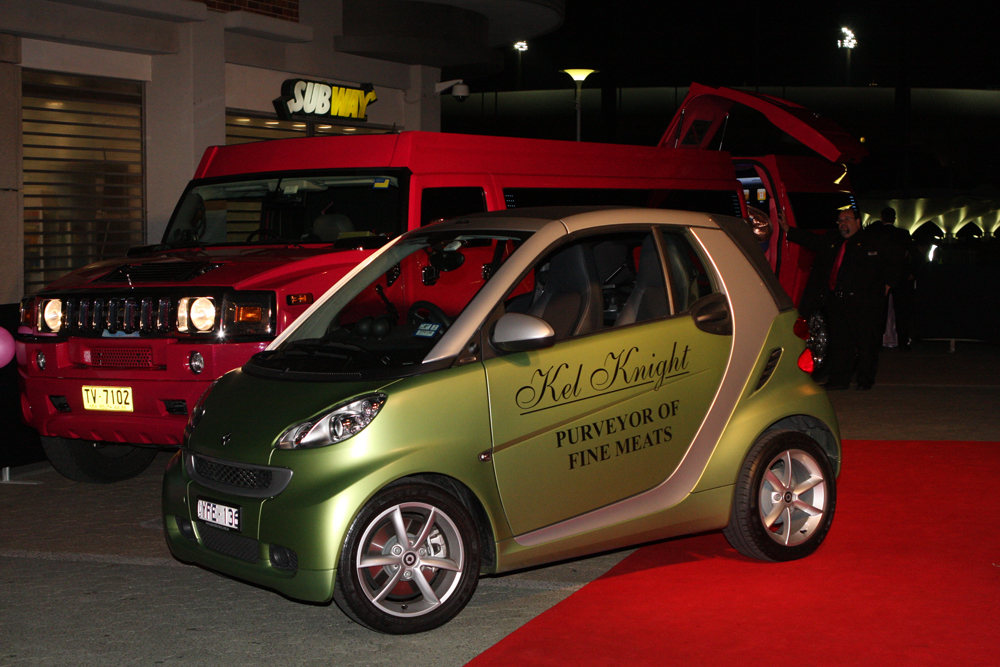
Kel's car at the Kath & Kimderella film premiere

Kel is known for driving a smart car around in the series

== See also ==
=== Other characters ===
- Kim Craig
- Kath Day-Knight
- Sharon Strzelecki
- Brett Craig
