= Kath Day-Knight =

- Kath & Kim character
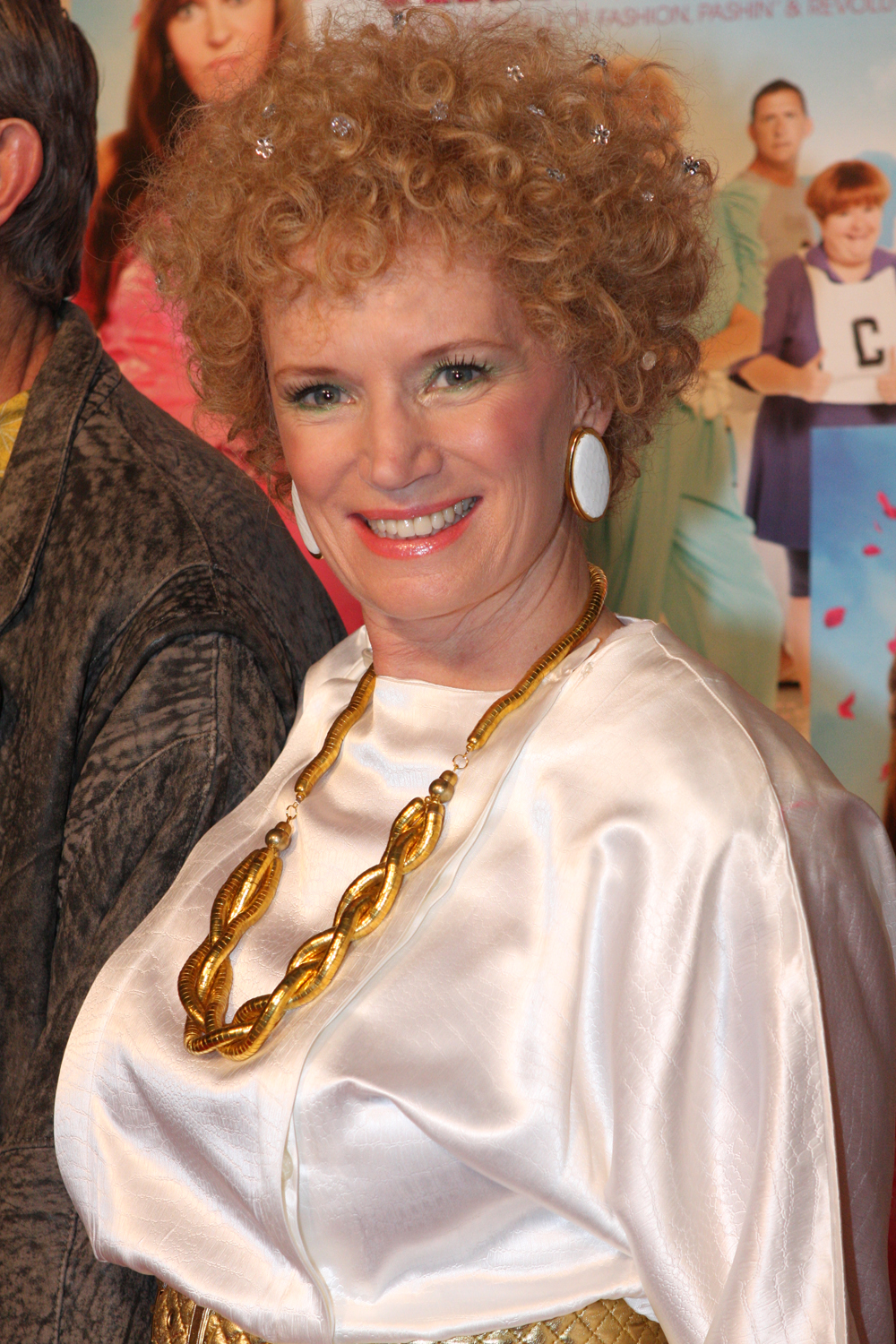
- Jane Turner As Kath at the film premiere of Kath & Kimderella
- First appearance: Fast Forward
- Last appearance: Kath & Kim: Our Effluent Life (2022)
- Created by: Gina Riley; Jane Turner
- Portrayed by: Jane Turner; Molly Shannon (US Adaptation)

In-universe information
- Full name: Kathleen Darleen Day-Knight
- Gender: Female
- Occupation: House Wife; Tafe Student (completed 34 adult education diplomas); Real Estate Agent; Entrepreneur; Actress
- Family: Epponee Rae (granddaughter); Brett Craig (son-in-law)
- Spouses: Gary Poole (?-2004; divorced); Kel Knight(2002—2003 annulled; 2004—present)
- Children: Kim Craig (daughter)
- Nationality: Australian

Kathleen "Kath" Darleen Day-Knight (formerly Poole) is a fictional character featured in the Australian television series Kath & Kim and is portrayed by Jane Turner. Her character has appeared on multiple Australian comedy series, first appearing as an early incarnation on Fast Forward, and later Big Girl's Blouse and Something Stupid as the more familiar Kath. She is revealed to be a Leo (series 2 episode 3; The Moon).

Molly Shannon portrayed her American version in the short lived American series. Kath's character is considered an Australian comedy icon. Kath was featured in Kath & Kimderella in 2012.

The idea for the series was originally grasped during the nineties while successful Australian shows such as Big Girl's Blouse had skits on them with identical characters of the same name. Kath & Kim aired first on 16 May 2002, and become a hit in Australia and internationally. The series ended in 2007; Turner returned to screens as Kath in 2012 with Kath & Kimderella which premiered in cinemas September-2012.

Jane Turner works with Gina Riley exclusively on Kath & Kim, as they are both credited as script writers and creators of the show itself.

== Personality ==
=== Physical appearance ===
Kath considers herself a sexy and successful mother who embodies the stereotypical housewife/urban mother personality. Kath's appearance is notable; mostly her hair, a curly blonde perm. Kath is proud of her fashion sense, even though she favours an outdated 80s fashion style, including shoulder pads, high-waisted trousers, brightly patterned sweaters and oversize earrings. Her favourite singer is Barbra Streisand and her favourite song to dance to is Darren Hayes's "Insatiable."

=== Personal outlook ===
Kath is extremely proud of herself and her looks. She is confident with a positive outlook on life; in fact the opening scene of season one episode one features Kath reflecting on how proud she is of her looks and calls herself "high maintenance". She is exasperated by her daughter Kim, who by contrast is overweight, lazy and rude. She and her husband Kel like to think of themselves as being adventurous, they have a healthy and active sex life and both love dancing. Kath loves her morning 'huffy-puffy' sessions on the Ski-time buttock and thigh toner. She and Kel have been known to indulge in Irish dancing as a form of sexual foreplay. Despite never having self image problems, Kath suffers occasional feelings of sadness for being four months older than husband Kel. She has an emergency fund for plastic surgery when the time comes but has so far limited herself to herbal facelifts.

=== Background and short story lines ===
Kath was born in 1954, and was married to Garry Poole. She lived in Fountain Lakes with Kim alone before meeting Kel. It was revealed that she was still married to Garry at the time, causing her worry she might get sent to prison for bigamy. They officially divorced and she married Kel again legally. Other than this, little is known about Kath's life although while sorting through old family pictures, Kath discovers that she is of Aboriginal descent, and this is proven by a DNA test. She is also of Manx and Chinese descent. She is primarily a housewife and doesn't have a full-time job although she did take a number of Tafe courses including in Real Estate as well as Yoga. She likes acting and appears in community theatre productions and a television commercial for adult nappies (causing sales to plummet). During the season finale, Kath & Kel make their house into a Bed and Breakfast named Kath & Kel's Kountry Kottage after they unsuccessfully attempt to buy their neighbour (and nemesis) Mandy's house next door. Kath is constantly frustrated by Kim and Brett's presence in her house after they move in during season two, and particularly after they turn the upstairs bathroom into a bedroom for Epponnee, forcing Kim and Brett to use Kath's ensuite. Kath is a strong supporter of the Richmond Tigers.

== Relationships ==
=== Kim ===
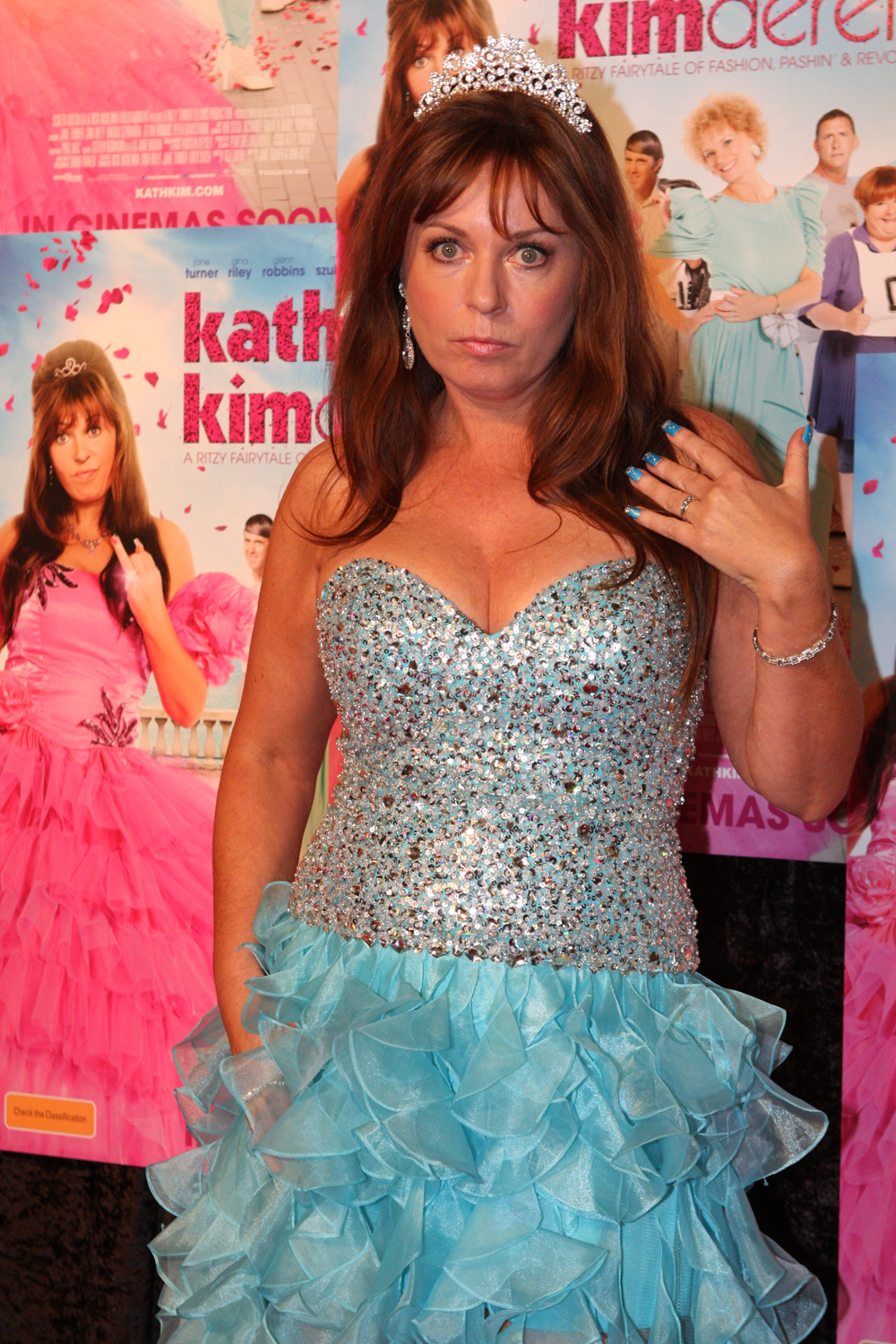
Kim Craig

Kim Craig, played by Gina Riley is Kath's lazy, ignorant, rude and shallow twenty-seven-year-old daughter. Kim took large advantage of Kath growing up, due to the fact that they had no male figure and Kath's husband Gary Poole left them to fend for themselves. Kim continues to take advantage of Kath as an adult, living in her house, eating her food and messing it up (which Kath hates as she is a "Neat-Freak"). Kath often doesn't take Kim's life and her several problems seriously, such as her repeated marriage break-ups with Brett. Kath is exasperated by Kim's presence and often nags her to move out and be more responsible. A running gag in the show are unreturned DVDs that Kath keeps nagging to Kim to return (that eventually by the end of the series have run up $90,000 in fines). During the final season, Kim got to be such a bother to Kath & Kel that they try to purchase their next-door neighbour Mandy's house, but are unsuccessful when nobody buys their own house. Ultimately, Kath and Kim do have a close relationship, as seen by the end of each episode where they chat and gossip in the back garden.

=== Kel ===
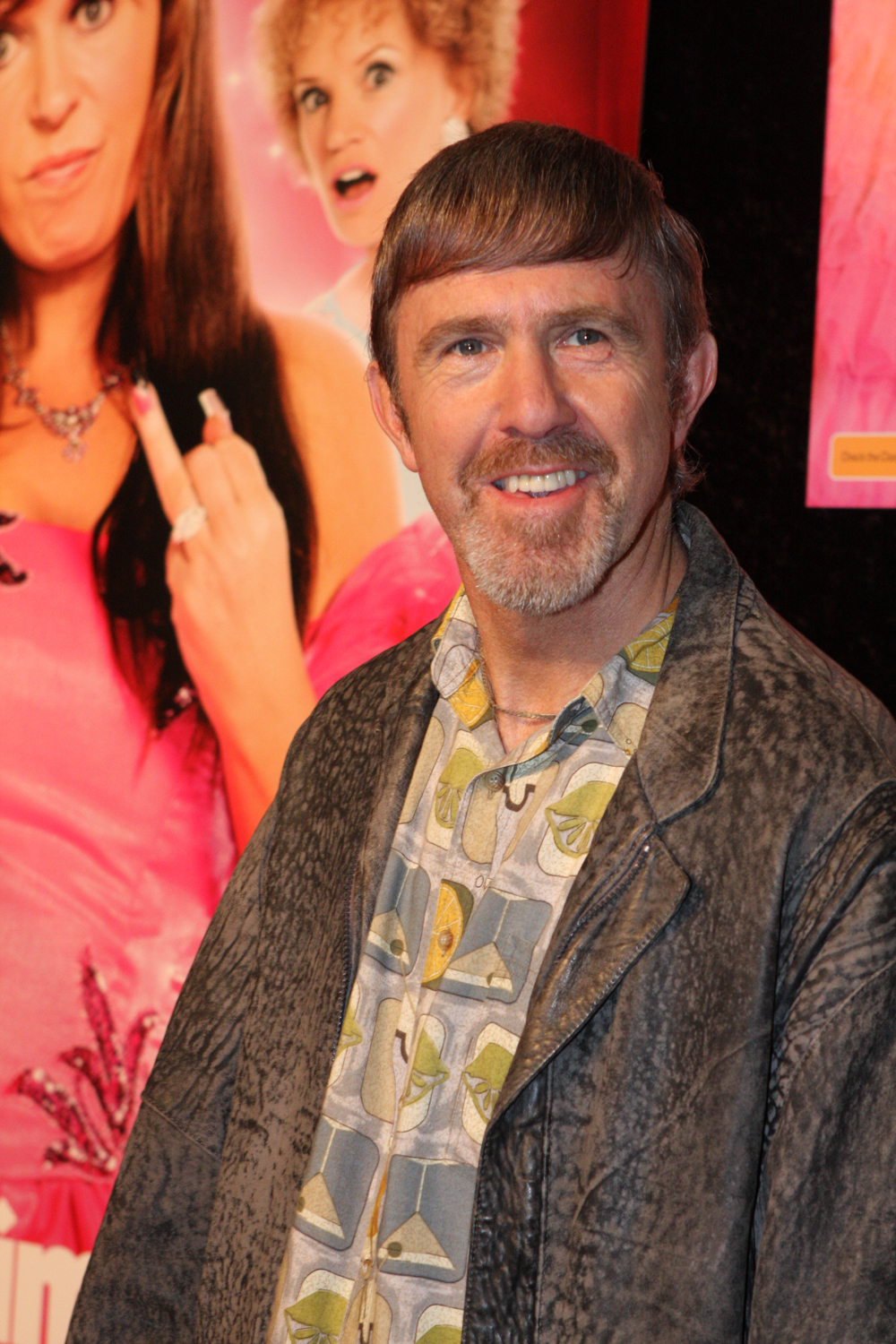
Kel Knight

Kel Knight Is Kath's metro husband, played by Glenn Robbins. Their relationship has always been fun, with the two "Oldies" feeling liberated. They married and moved in together. Kath and Kel have an almost picture-perfect marriage with relatively minor downfalls compared to Kim and Brett, such as the time when Kel took over duties as the house woman (cooking, cleaning and maintaining the house) which bothered Kath to the brink; also the fact that Kim hates Kel and has never accepted her mother getting married at fifty years old and having a life outside of hers.

=== Sharon ===
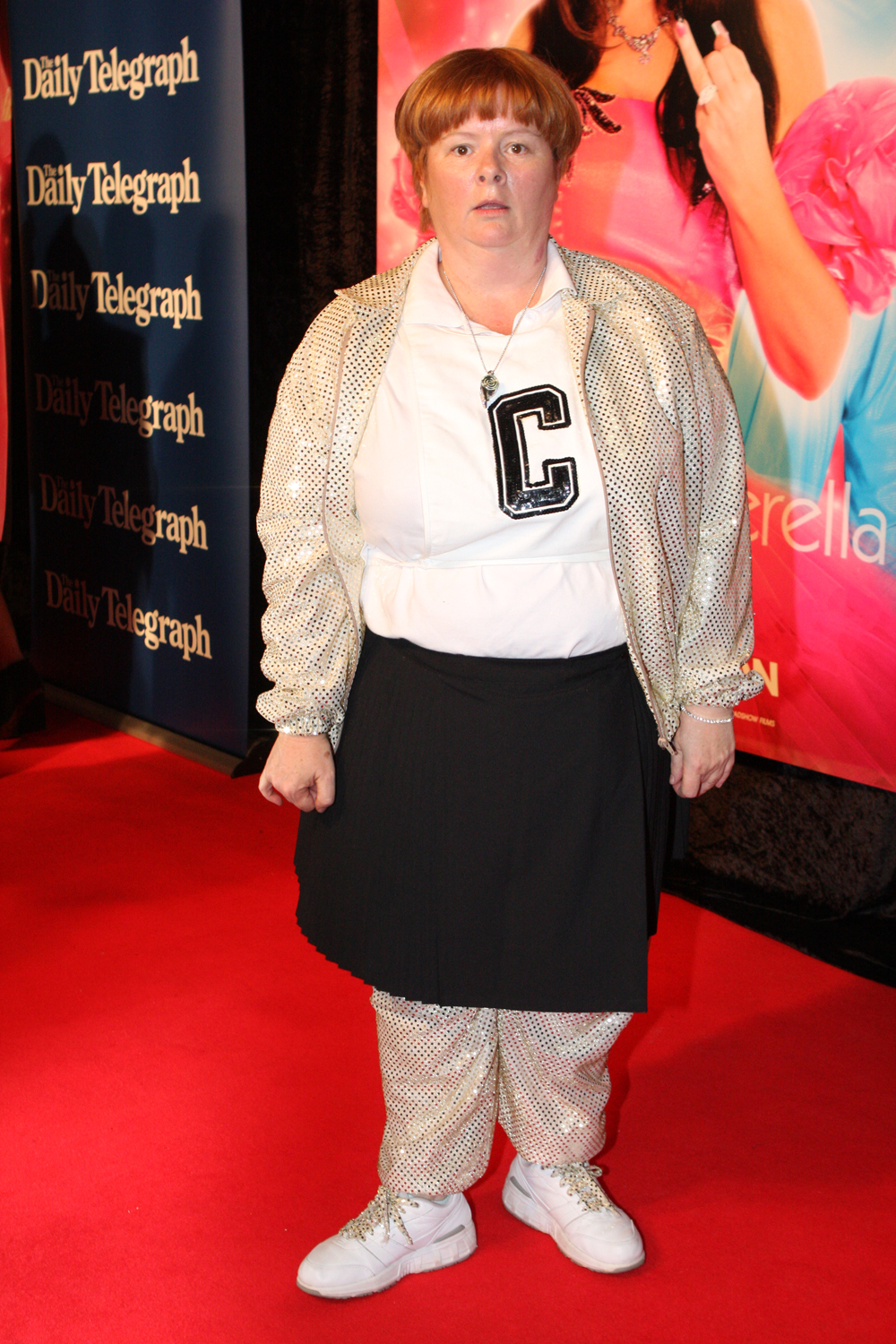
Sharon Strzelecki

Sharon Strzelecki is Kim's second best friend. During the series Kath and Sharon like each other, Kath is usually the one standing up for Sharon when Kim throws a tantrum at Sharon (usually concerning food). The only time Kath is seen throwing a tantrum at Sharon is when her drink was spiked in the episode "Party".

=== Brett ===
Brett is Kath's son-in-law, during the series Brett is bombarded with Kath and Kel's sexual relationship (usually when they would just come back from a holiday). In the episode "Holiday" Brett and Kim plan a romantic trip to Queensland, however Brett ends up going to Queensland for a 'working holiday' with Kath and Kel also Sharon, Kath gets angry with Brett making her upset and their relationship is temporarily ruined, however after returning home they reinstate their relationship.

=== Other relationships ===
Kath is very much liked by Kim's husband, Brett Craig and Kim's second-best friend Sharon Strzelecki. Kath appears to be there for the two of them while Kim sits and watches Television or is obsessed with herself. Kath also provides advice to them, Sharon especially. Kath encouraged Sharon to chase her roots in the last season, which led her to meet her obnoxious (almost Kim's reflection) half sister Karen (played by Matt Lucas). Kath is also a loving grandmother to her beautiful infant granddaughter, Epponee Raye and is there for her more than her own daughter, Kim.

== Quirks, personality traits and features ==
Kath has many different habits and mannerisms which have gained iconic status in Australian culture, particularly her idiomatic accent and frequent mispronunciations and malapropisms.

Kath consistently makes references to her dozens of courses in TAFE during the series; these include cycling and tennis, real estate, floral design, interior design, and business studies. When Kim, Sharon, Kath or others are in a difficult situation, she will stop and say "time out" and "look at me" with an exaggerated West Melbourne accent ("look at moi") and get everyone present to stare her in the eye. She will then go on to say "I've got one word to say to you", which will usually be followed with a comment of more than one word. When Kath and Kim (and often Sharon) see something they like or something out of the blue, they all murmur to each other "It's nice, It's different, It's unusual" all at the same time. These two running jokes are the taglines of the franchise, and are widely quoted in popular culture.

== See also ==
=== Other characters ===
- Kim Craig
- Sharon Strzelecki
- Kel Knight
- Brett Craig
