= List of Kath & Kim episodes =

The following is an episode list of the Australian comedy program Kath & Kim, initially on ABC TV, and as of 2007, on the Seven Network.

There have been four series of eight episodes each, one telemovie, and one movie. The first three series and the telemovie ran on ABC from 2002 to 2005. The fourth series initially aired on the Seven Network in 2007, and the movie was released in 2012. A two-part 20th anniversary special aired in 2022.

== Series overview ==
Season	Episodes	Originally released		
Season	Episodes	First released	Last released	Network
1	8	16 May 2002	4 July 2002	ABC
2	8	18 September 2003	6 November 2003	ABC
3	8	7 October 2004	25 November 2004	ABC
Telemovie		27 November 2005		ABC
4	8	19 August 2007	14 October 2007	Seven Network
Movie		6 September 2012		—N/a
5	2	20 November 2022	21 November 2022	Seven Network

== Episodes ==
=== Season 1 (2002) ===
No. overall	No. in season	Title	Directed by	Written by	Original release date	Prod. code
1	1	"Sex"	Ted Emery	Jane Turner & Gina Riley	16 May 2002	101
Kath's recently married daughter Kim moves back in insisting her marriage to Brett is over. Kim begins to suspect Brett is having an affair and has her second best friend Sharon stalk him. Meanwhile Kim is disgusted that her mother Kath is dating butcher Kel Knight. Kel proposes to Kath at Harvey Norman.
2	2	"Gay"	Ted Emery	Jane Turner & Gina Riley	23 May 2002	102
Kim swears off men and takes up golf with Sharon. This leads Kath to suspect Kim is a lesbian. When Kath voices her theory to Kel, he reasons that homosexual activity isn't unusual or uncommon: after all he was in the navy for six years. Kath begins to question her relationship with Kel. Kim goes speed dating with Sharon, who meets fiddler Mark. None of the men are interested in Kim and she calls Brett to come rescue her.
3	3	"Sport"	Ted Emery	Jane Turner & Gina Riley	30 May 2002	103
Kim joins Sharon's netball team so she can rough up the Bolton twins, who seduced Brett when he was drunk. Kel is obsessed with making the perfect gourmet sausage.
4	4	"Fat"	Ted Emery	Jane Turner & Gina Riley	6 June 2002	104
Kim quits smoking but her increased eating means she cannot fit into her bridesmaid's dress. She tries the Celine Cuisine diet plan, based on Celine Dion's diet. Sharon becomes a marriage guidance counsellor. Kath and Kel fall out over their vows when they meet Marion the marriage celebrant.
5	5	"Old"	Ted Emery	Jane Turner & Gina Riley	13 June 2002	105
Kim makes Kath feel self conscious about her age so she invests in the new homeboy fashion range. Kath is upset when Kel stands her up several times (he's secretly learning to waltz). Kim maintains her treat-'em-mean-keep-'em-keen campaign with Brett.
6	6	"Money"	Ted Emery	Jane Turner & Gina Riley	20 June 2002	106
Kath is desperate to raise the money to hire a carriage for the wedding. When all else fails she holds a lingerie party, with Kim and Sharon as models. Kel asks Brett to be his best man. Kim becomes obsessed with the internet, indulging in home shopping and chatroom dating. Kel suspects Kath has a new lover.
7	7	"Party"	Ted Emery	Jane Turner & Gina Riley	27 June 2002	107
Kim organises Kath's hen's night after rejecting Sharon's idea—a marathon session of Rocky and Mighty Ducks videos. Kath and Kim have a night to remember after their drinks are apparently "spiked". Kel and Brett's sedate "Buck's turn" ends horribly when they are robbed and chained up in their underwear outside Flinders Street station.
8	8	"The Wedding"	Ted Emery	Jane Turner & Gina Riley	4 July 2002	108
The big day is beset by hitches: Kath suffers a horse hair allergy and from slippery shoes, Kim forgets to clean the bin before filling it with punch, Kel indulges in too much Dutch courage, the horse used to pull the carriage goes on the rampage. Kim, Kath and Sharon end up in hospital.

=== Season 2 (2003) ===
No. overall	No. in season	Title	Directed by	Written by	Original release date	Prod. code
9	1	"The Announcement"	Ted Emery	Jane Turner & Gina Riley	18 September 2003	201
Brett has changed the locks to keep Kim out of the marital unit. They reconcile on New Year's Eve, and announce they are trying for a baby. After the injuries suffered at the wedding, Kath has lost her libido, and even the orgy scene from Eyes Wide Shut fails to revive it. Kath and Kel seek help from Marion, who espouses nudism. Kim worries there is something wrong when she fails to "fall", and tells Brett to wear looser trousers. Kath's libido returns after her nudist phase. Sharon's first date with Mark is a disaster when she goes nude to a costume party. Brett also tries nudism, but Kim was actually pregnant all along and was misreading the results of her pregnancy test.
10	2	"Inside Out"	Ted Emery	Jane Turner & Gina Riley	25 September 2003	202
New to Kath's home, Kel strives for domestic excellence—which extends to prissy nagging—leaving Kath feeling useless with nothing to do. Kim and Brett start renovating their unit, resulting in endless arguments. Looking for an outlet, Kath arrives to help them, but soon wears out her welcome. Sharon plays war games. Brett's tree-felling attempts damage the roof and Kim and Brett move back in to Kath's.
11	3	"The Moon"	Ted Emery	Jane Turner & Gina Riley	2 October 2003	203
Brett is working 48 hours straight and a bored Kim makes a nuisance of herself at Kath's. Sharon is reunited with old school friend Lisa-Marie (Sibylla Budd) making Kim jealous. Kim refuses to attend the school reunion, but when Sharon and Lisa-Marie plan to attend it together Kim decides to go. Kim's attempt at fashion attracts ridicule. Kath plans her and Kel's honeymoon while he struggles to prepare his GST reporting. When all planes are grounded due to a GST-related strike they spend their holiday at the airport. Sharon plans to move to the Gold Coast with Lisa-Marie. Kel returns to his GST reporting while cursing John Howard. Kim and Sharon have a strident reconciliation.
12	4	"Obsession"	Ted Emery	Jane Turner & Gina Riley	9 October 2003	204
Kath and Kel are exhausted by all their boxercising and Kel can't perform sexually. Sharon's boyfriend Mark has ditched her in favour of Moira, a leggy riverdancer. Brett applies for a promotion at work, and Kim decides to become a corporate wife to assist him. Kath and Kel undergo cosmetic enhancement. Kim causes havoc at Brett's after work drinks. Sharon tries river dancing to win back Mark's affections. Kel's libido suddenly returns at an inopportune moment.
13	5	"My Boyfriend"	Ted Emery	Jane Turner & Gina Riley	16 October 2003	205
Sharon enlists her boastful boyfriend Mark for her netball team. Kim has doubts about Brett's manliness. Kath's attempts to make a fruit hat for her floral design course go awry when she loses phone reception and Telstra aren't forthcoming.
14	6	"Another Announcement"	Ted Emery	Jane Turner & Gina Riley	23 October 2003	206
Kim and Brett clash over potential names for their baby. Brett refuses to go to the birth classes. Sharon applies to become a Commonwealth Games volunteer. Kath and Kel buy a pet dog and name it "Epponnee-Rae". Kim is upset as she was planning that name for her baby.
15	7	"The Shower"	Ted Emery	Jane Turner & Gina Riley	30 October 2003	207
Kim is upset when her best friend Tina can't come to the baby shower: she says she has to stay home because of a pencil in her eye. Sharon takes a shine to Kel's best friend Sandy Freckle (William McInnes) but Sandy seems more interested in Kath.
16	8	"The Hideous Truth"	Ted Emery	Jane Turner & Gina Riley	6 November 2003	208
When Kim goes into labour Kath reminisces about the ordeal she went through giving birth to Kimberley Diane Poole with little help from the father, Gary Poole. Kim recalls her first meeting with Brett, when he had bad hair and was dating Sharon. A blast from the past arrives at the hospital.

=== Season 3 (2004) ===
No. overall	No. in season	Title	Directed by	Written by	Original release date	Prod. code
17	1	"Cactus Hour"	Ted Emery	Jane Turner & Gina Riley	7 October 2004	301
The mood is tense at Lagoon Court when Kath's first husband and Kim's dad Gary Grace Poole moves back in claiming to be broke and homeless. Gary claims he never signed his divorce papers from Kath. This leaves Kath and Kel's marriage invalid and Kath fearing bigamy charges. Kim is loving herself sick as a new mum.
18	2	"The Mango Espadrille"	Ted Emery	Jane Turner & Gina Riley	14 October 2004	302
Kath, Kim and Sharon go to the races. Kath tries to help out at the butcher shop. Epponnee auditions for Bubs Idol.
19	3	"Sitting on a Pile"	Ted Emery	Jane Turner & Gina Riley	21 October 2004	303
Kel attends a conference but fails to click with anyone. Kath plans a lunch with Barb Cousins but due to a missed message is at the wrong venue and thinks she's been stood up. Kim and Sharon go on a factory outlet shopping tour. Brett visits his mum, Lorraine (also played by Magda Szubanski). Kel and Kath make friends with a doppelganger couple (played by Geoffrey Rush and Jane Menelaus).
20	4	"Kicking Up a Stink"	Ted Emery	Jane Turner & Gina Riley	28 October 2004	304
Kim's cabbage diet has an unexpected side effect: flatulence. Kel and Kath star in The Hours – The Musical directed by the intense and demanding Robyn Robinson (Gina Riley). Robyn seems to have it in for Kath—but she loves Kel. Kim ruins Sharon's attempt at running a fitness boot camp and her independent attempt at exercise results in a bruised ego and swollen nose. Sharon instead becomes stage manager on The Hours. Kim goes off her cabbage diet but luckily cabbage pastizzis are the lusty Mrs Robinson's favourite.
21	5	"Hello Nails!"	Ted Emery	Jane Turner & Gina Riley	4 November 2004	305
Sharon's got a date so Kim gives Sharon a major makeover. Kath insists upon updating the home theatre system as it is three years old, but Kel's attempts to secure a good deal fail, and Kath likes Brett's ideas better anyway. With the new system in place Kath develops a TV addiction.
22	6	"High and Dry"	Ted Emery	Jane Turner & Gina Riley	11 November 2004	306
Brett's exciting news means Kim has to pull her considerable weight financially, so she gets a job as a door bitch. Ditto Kath, whose new career venture as an underwear model leads to television stardom for her and Kel.
23	7	"Foxy on the Run"	Ted Emery	Jane Turner & Gina Riley	18 November 2004	307
Sharon is anxious to be Epponnee-Rae's godmother. Kath plans a big party for Kel's 50th birthday—a milestone that has Kel suffering a mid-life crisis. Kim dreams of wearing size 10 sass & bide jeans for her birthday.
24	8	"99% Fat Free"	Ted Emery	Jane Turner & Gina Riley	25 November 2004	308
Kath and Kel go fat-free after seeking advice from their doctor. Brett and Kim clash over their child's career path after Kim decides Epponnee will join the cast of Neighbours. Flash forward segments feature the wedding of Epponnee-Rae (Kylie Minogue).

=== Da Kath & Kim Code ===
Riley and Turner planned to take 2005 off from television, but in July, they announced that they would be writing and filming a 90-minute telemovie. The movie aired on 27 November 2005, and was the ABC's top rated program for 2005, achieving an average audience of 2.1 million and a peak audience of 2.4 million. The telemovie screened in New Zealand in December and was sold to networks in the United Kingdom and the United States. It was the last Kath & Kim production shown on the ABC before it moved to the Seven Network.

Kel and Kath return from The Da Vinci Code European tour and begin frantic preparations for Christmas. During the two weeks leading up to Christmas Day Kim discovers that Brett is once again having an affair, this time with his boss Kelly. Brett stays at "The Buckingham Motel". Kim eventually asks him back, but he is still conducting the affair. Sharon meets a man, Marriat, online and they become engaged. She is heart broken to later learn that he does not actually exist, but is just a blog. Kath and Kel become backup dancers for Michael Bublé at Carols by Candlelight, Melbourne. Kath's affection for him results in Kel letting out his "green eyed monster". She tells him that he shouldn't bother going home as he wouldn't be welcome. Kel, too, goes to stay at "The Buckingham". Kath forgives Kel and he returns home for Christmas. Kath and Kel also receive strange messages from John Monk (Barry Humphries), the albino running Da Vinci Code tour, including one saying "44 Euros". John Monk visits their home. Kel thinks he has cracked the code and Monk is going to kill them, but he just wants to offer them a franchise. An epilogue shows Kath's first day as a tour guide on the Da Vinci Code 2 tour: G'day Leonardo.

The telemovie featured a number of notable Australian guest cast including Rove McManus, Rhonda Burchmore and The Wiggles.

Da Kath and Kim Code was released to DVD as a 2-disc set on 1 December 2005, and was bundled with Kath & Kim Live in London. The DVD was briefly discontinued and repackaged again on 1 April 2010.

=== Season 4 (2007) ===
Following a break in 2006, Kath & Kim began shooting a fourth season with the series moving to the Seven Network. The season premiered on Sunday 19 August 2007 at 7:30 pm, attracting an Australian audience of 2.521 million nationally. Sharon and Kim appear on fellow Seven Network show Deal or No Deal in a few specially-filmed scenes. Special guests to feature in this season include Matt Lucas, Shane Warne, Rob Sitch, Andrew O'Keefe, Eric Bana, Maggie Beer, Shannon Bennett, Bill Granger, Donna Hay and Kylie Kwong.

No. overall	No. in season	Title	Directed by	Written by	Original release date	Prod. code	Aus. viewers (millions)
25	1	"Holiday"	Ted Emery	Jane Turner & Gina Riley	19 August 2007	401	2.521
Brett plans a romantic trip away with Kim in tropical Queensland to try and re-invigorate their marriage. Much to Brett's chagrin, Kath, Kel and Sharon go along. Brett clashes with Kath and she storms off. Sharon is accused of ball tampering, again.
26	2	"Fame"	Ted Emery	Jane Turner & Gina Riley	26 August 2007	402	2.016
Kim is sparing no expense to ensure Epponnee's first birthday party blows everyone out of the water. Kel wins a retailer's award but lets it go to his head, resulting in a punchup with Eric Bana at celebrity event at Bonbeach station.
27	3	"Work"	Ted Emery	Jane Turner & Gina Riley	2 September 2007	403	1.767
Kath becomes a health professional—with a TAFE certificate to prove it—and gives Kel yoga massages. When Kel is injured and off work, his new apprentice Katie (Katie Hastings) revamps the butcher store, which includes bringing in the fresh "grass" she has grown at home in her hydroponic garden. Kim plans a new career as a cosmetic surgeon—with Sharon as her guinea pig. Brett is busting to impress his bosses at work.
28	4	"Environment"	Ted Emery	Jane Turner & Gina Riley	9 September 2007	404	2.045
Kim has her sights set on a private school for Epponnee. Kath and Kel invest in a grey water recycling system, which nearly rolls away in the car park.
29	5	"House"	Ted Emery	Jane Turner & Gina Riley	16 September 2007	405	2.144
Kath and Kel's ensuite receives much traffic after Kim and Brett move in and convert the other bathroom into a nursery, and the downstairs toilet becomes blocked. With the neighbour's house for sale, Kel puts in an offer. Sharon and Kim put their smarts on the line as contestants on Deal or No Deal.
30	6	"Roots"	Ted Emery	Jane Turner & Gina Riley	23 September 2007	406	2.050
Kath unravels a secret about her family's heritage. Sharon meets her long-lost half-sister from England, Karen (Matt Lucas). Sharon is disappointed when Karen bonds with Kim. Kath looks into her Aboriginal heritage, but Kim isn't happy to find out about her ancestry. Kel is disappointed when his research fails to turn up any nobility amongst his ancestors, until Karen's wig and Kim's celebrity magazine suggest otherwise.
31	7	"Lust"	Ted Emery	Jane Turner & Gina Riley	7 October 2007	407	2.069
Sharon has sworn off men and has been celibate for three months. Brett has had a one-night stand and Kim throws him out. Sharon becomes too lusty watching sportsmen on TV and uses chocolate as a substitute. With nowhere to go Brett stays with Sharon but with the sport on TV and no chocolate in the house they wind up in bed together, giving Kim a nasty shock the following morning.
32	8	"Wedding of the Century"	Ted Emery	Jane Turner & Gina Riley	14 October 2007	408	2.304
Sharon falls in love with Wayne (played by celebrity guest Shane Warne), and Kath and Kim plan Sharon's wedding. Brett is fired from Computa City but gets a job at Krispy Kreme Doughnuts. Brett buys another apartment for Kim and Epponnee and a car for Sharon: a Mitsubishi Colt as a limosuine for her upcoming wedding. Kath and Kel embark on a new business venture, turning their house into a beautiful bed and breakfast. After Sharon's wedding she sadly announces Wayne has bought a phone. Kath & Kel's Kountry Kottage is overrun by family members returning to stay: Brett and Kim can no longer afford the apartment as Kim owes $90,000 in overdue DVD fines.

=== Specials (2022) ===
Title	Directed by	Written by	Original release date	Aus. viewers (millions)
"Our Effluent Life"	Ted Emery	Jane Turner & Gina Riley	20 November 2022	0.786
"20 Preposterous Years"	Ted Emery	Jane Turner & Gina Riley	21 November 2022	0.506
