= 2000 Australian Film Institute Awards =

Australian film and TV awards ceremony

42nd Australian Film Institute Awards
- Date: 18 November 2000
- Site: Fox Studios Australia, Sydney
- Hosted by: Jonathan Biggins

Highlights
- Most awards: Film: Looking for Alibrandi and Bootmen (5); TV: Grass Roots (5)
- Most nominations: Film: Chopper (10); TV: Grass Roots (12)

Television coverage
- Network: SBS

The 42nd Australian Film Institute Awards (generally known as the AFI Awards) were held on 18 November 2000 at the Fox Studios Australia in Sydney. The ceremony was broadcast on SBS and hosted by comedian Jonathan Biggins. Presented by the Australian Film Institute (AFI), the awards celebrated the best in Australian feature film, documentary, short film and television productions of 2000. AFI introduced five new television categories for the 2000 awards, including best performance for an actor or actress in a guest role and a television open craft award. The awards for Best Performance By an Actor or Actress in a Television Drama were also judged over three episodes instead of one. The nominations were announced on 18 October 2000. Chopper received the most nominations in the feature film category with 10, while Grass Roots received 12 nominations in the television category.

== Winners and nominees ==
Winners are listed first and highlighted in boldface.

=== Feature film ===
Best Film	Best Direction
**Looking for Alibrandi – Robyn Kershaw**; Better Than Sex – Bruna Papandrea and Frank Cox; Bootmen – Hilary Linstead; Chopper – Michele Bennett	**Andrew Dominik – Chopper**; Jonathan Teplitzky – Better Than Sex; Kate Woods – Looking for Alibrandi; Pip Karmel – Me Myself I
Best Actor in a Leading Role	Best Actress in a Leading Role
**Eric Bana – Chopper**; Steve Bastoni – 15 Amore; David Wenham – Better Than Sex; Sam Worthington – Bootmen	**Pia Miranda – Looking for Alibrandi**; Julia Blake – Innocence; Rachel Griffiths – Me Myself I; Susie Porter – Better Than Sex
Best Performance by an Actor in a Supporting Role	Best Performance by an Actress in a Supporting Role
**Simon Lyndon – Chopper**; Martin Henderson – Kick; Sam Neill – My Mother Frank; Terry Norris – Innocence	**Greta Scacchi – Looking for Alibrandi**; Elena Cotta – Looking for Alibrandi; Sacha Horler – Russian Doll; Kris McQuade – Better Than Sex
Best Original Screenplay	Best Adapted Screenplay
**Stavros Kazantzidis and Allanah Zitserman – Russian Doll**; Jonathan Teplitzky – Better Than Sex; Pip Karmel – Me Myself I; Mark Lamprell – My Mother Frank	**Melina Marchetta – Looking for Alibrandi**; Andrew Dominik – Chopper; Harry Cripps, Greg Haddrick, Simon Hopkinson – The Magic Pudding
Best Cinematography	Best Editing
**Steve Mason – Bootmen**; John Brock – 15 Amore; Geoffrey Hall and Kevin Hayward – Chopper; Toby Oliver – Looking for Alibrandi	**Martin Connor – Looking for Alibrandi**; Jane Moran – Bootmen; Ken Sallows – Chopper; Denise Haratzis – Me Myself I
Best Sound	Best Original Music Score
**David Lee, Laurence Maddy, Andrew Plain, Ian McLoughlin – Bootmen**; Frank Lipson, Glenn Newnham, Steve Burgess, John Schiefelbein – Chopper; Phil Judd, Dave Eggins, Julius Chan, Liam Egan, Les Fiddess – The Magic Pudding; Phil Judd, Bronwyn Murphy, Liam Egan, Julius Chan – A Wreck A Tangle	**Cezary Skubiszewski – Bootmen**; David Hirschfelder – Better Than Sex; Mick Harvey – Chopper; Carlo Giacco – 15 Amore
Best Production Design	Best Costume Design
**Murray Picknett – Bootmen**; Tara Kamath – Better Than Sex; Paddy Reardon – Chopper; Stephen Curtis – Looking for Alibrandi	**Tess Schofield – Bootmen**; Emma Hamilton Lewis – 15 Amore; Paul Warren – The Wog Boy; Louise Wakefield – Walk the Talk

=== Non-feature film ===
Best Documentary	Best Direction in a Documentary
**The Diplomat – Sally Browning and Wilson da Silva**; A Death in the Family – Terry Carlyon and Robyn Miller; Stolen Generations – Tom Zubrycki; Uncle Chatzkel – Rod Freedman and Emile Sherman	**Tom Zubrycki – The Diplomat**; Terry Carlyon – A Death in the Family; Amiel Courtin-Wilson – Chasing Buddha; Wain Fimeri – Pozieres
Best Short Fiction Film	Best Short Animation Film
**Confessions of a Headhunter – Sally Riley**; Flowergirl – Cate Shortland; Kulli Foot – Brendan Fletcher; The Extra – Darren Ashton	**Brother – Adam Elliot**; Full Circle – Adam Head; Leunig: Tricks – Andrew Horne; The Way of the Birds – Sarah Watt
Best Screenplay in a Short Film	Best Cinematography in a Non-Feature Film
**Adam Elliot – Brother**; Sally Riley and Archie Weller – Confessions of a Headhunter; Peter Carstairs – Gate; Vikki Blanche – The Other Days of Ruby Rae	**Klaus Toft, Campbell Miller, Wade Fairley, Malcolm Ludgate – La Nina**; David Burr – Breathe; Kathryn Milliss – The Letter; Vincent Taylor – The Nightlight
Best Editing in a Non-Feature Film	Best Sound in a Non-Feature Film
**Andrea Lang – Thomson of Arnhem Land**; Louis Byrne-Smith – The Extra; Patrick Hughes – The Director; Jack Rath and Phillip Crawford – Hurt	**Mark Tarpey, Paul Pirola, Livia Ruzic – Pozieres**; Craig Carter, Mark Street, Bryce Grunden, Emma Bortignon – La Nina; Paul Miskin – The Third Note; Liam Price – Intransit

=== Television ===
Best Telefeature or Mini Series	Best Episode in a Television Drama Series
**On the Beach (Seven Network) – John Edwards, Errol Sullivan, Jeff Hayes, Greg Coote**; Halifax f.p. – Series 5: "A Person of Interest" (Nine Network) – Roger Le Mesurier, Roger Simpson, John Hugginson; The Secret Life of Us – Series 1 (Network Ten) – John Edwards, Amanda Higgs; Waiting at the Royal (Nine Network) – Andrew Wiseman, Richard Keddie	**Grass Roots – Series 1, Episode 8: "The Whole Year" (ABC) – John Eastway**; Grass Roots – Series 1, Episode 7: "Late July 4.00pm to 10.30pm" (ABC) – John Eastway; Grass Roots – Series 1, Episode 2: "Late September" (ABC) – John Eastway; SeaChange – Series 3, Episode 3: "Hungi Jury" (ABC) – Sally Ayre-Smith
Best Episode in a Television Drama Series (Long)	Best Children's Television Drama
**All Saints – "Valley of the Shadows: Part 1" (Seven Network) – Jo Porter**; All Saints – "Dead on Time" (Seven Network) – Jo Porter; Something in the Air – "Movers and Shakers" (ABC) – Roger Le Mesurier, Roger Simpson, Ros Tatarka; Something in the Air – "We Will Remember Them" (ABC) – Roger Le Mesurier, Roger Simpson, Ros Tatarka	**Eugénie Sandler P.I. – Episode 2 (ABC) – Margot McDonald**; Eugénie Sandler P.I. – Episode 13 (ABC) – Margot McDonald; Round the Twist – "Whirling Derfish" (ABC) – Patricia Edgar; Thunderstone – "Before The Comet" (Network Ten) – Jonathan M. Shiff
Best Achievement in Direction in a Television Drama	Best Screenplay in a Television Drama
**Peter Andrikidis – Grass Roots – Series 1, Episode 8: "The Whole Year" (ABC)**; Ken Cameron – Halifax f.p – Series 5: "A Person Of Interest" (Nine Network); Glenda Hambly – Waiting at the Royal (Nine Network); Richard Jasek – Something in the Air – "We Will Remember Them" (ABC)	**Geoffrey Atherden – Grass Roots – Series 1, Episode 8: "The Whole Year" (ABC)**; Geoffrey Atherden – Grass Roots – Series 1, Episode 7: "Late July, Friday 4pm to 10.30pm" (ABC); Anne Brooksbank – Halifax f.p. – Series 5: "A Person of Interest" (Nine Network); Katherine Thomson – Something in the Air – Episode 36: "We Will Remember Them" (ABC)
Best Actor in a Leading Role in a Television Drama	Best Actress in a Leading Role in a Television Drama
**Geoff Morrell – Grass Roots – Series 1, Episode 8: "The Whole Year" (ABC)**; Tom Long – SeaChange – Series 3, Episode 2: "How Much Greener Was My Neighbour's Valley" (ABC); Rhys Muldoon – Grass Roots – Series 1, Episode 7: "Late July, Friday 4pm to 10.30pm" (ABC)	**Anne Phelan – Something in the Air – Episode 36: "We Will Remember Them" (ABC)**; Rhondda Findleton – Grass Roots – Series 1, Episode 7: "Late July, Friday 4pm to 10.30pm" (ABC); Sophie Heathcote – Grass Roots – Series 1, Episode 8: "The Whole Year" (ABC); Anita Hegh – Stingers – Series 2, Episode 18: "Men In The Dark" (Nine Network)
Best Performance by an Actor in a Telefeature or Mini Series	Best Performance by an Actress in a Telefeature or Mini Series
**Andy Anderson – Halifax f.p. – Series 5: "A Person of Interest" (Nine Network)**; Simon Baker – Secret Men's Business (ABC); Nicholas Eadie – Halifax f.p. – Series 5: "A Hate Worse Than Death" (Nine Network); Joel Edgerton – The Secret Life of Us – Series 1 (Network Ten)	**Noni Hazlehurst – Waiting at the Royal (Nine Network)**; Essie Davis – Halifax f.p. – Series 5: "The Spider And The Fly" (Nine Network); Rebecca Gibney – Halifax f.p. – Series 5: "A Person of Interest" (Nine Network); Jo Kennedy – Waiting at the Royal (Nine Network)
Best Performance by an Actor in a Guest Role in a Television Drama Series	Best Performance by an Actress in a Guest Role in a Television Drama Series
**Chris Haywood – Stingers – Series 2, Episode 18: "Men in the Dark" (Nine Network)**; Aaron Blabey – Stingers – Series 3, Episode 17: "Second Chance" (Nine Network); Daniel Daperis – Stingers – Series 3, Episode 2: "Forced Perspective" (Nine Network); David Field – Grass Roots – Series 1, Episode 2: "Late September" (ABC)	**Lois Ramsey – Grass Roots – Series 1, Episode 2: "Late September" (ABC)**; Deborra-Lee Furness – SeaChange – Series 3, Episode 3: "Hungi Jury" (ABC); Natalia Novikova – SeaChange – Series 3, Episode 2: "How Much Greener Was My Neighbour's Valley" (ABC)

=== Additional awards ===
Raymond Longford Award	Byron Kennedy Award
**Anthony Buckley** (producer)	**Matt Wheeldon** and **Gary Doust** – Founders of Popcorn Taxi; **Stephen Jenner** and **David Barda** – Founders of IF Magazine
Young Actors' Award	Best Foreign Film
**Kane McNay – Mallboy**; Xaris Miller – Eugénie Sandler P.I. – Episode 2 (ABC)	**American Beauty – Bruce Cohen and Dan Jinks**; All About My Mother – Agustín Almodóvar; Being John Malkovich – Michael Stipe and Sandy Stern; The Sixth Sense – Kathleen Kennedy, Frank Marshall and Barry Mendel
Open Craft Award	Open Craft Television Award
**Phillip Crawford (for original concept) – Hurt**; Mike Daly (for special effects) – Intransit; Guy Gross (for original score) – Uncle Chatzkel; Magda Hughes (for acting) – The Other Days of Ruby Rae	**Roger Ford** and **Sally Shepherd** (for set design) – On the Beach; Brent Crockett (for cinematography) – Halifax f.p. – Episode: "A Person of Interest"; Martin McGrath (for cinematography) – On the Beach; Mark Wareham (for cinematography) – Beastmaster – Episode: "The Last Unicorn"
