= Ladies in Black (film) =

2018 Australian film by Bruce Beresford

- Theatrical release poster
- Directed by: Bruce Beresford
- Written by: Bruce Beresford; Sue Milliken
- Based on: The Women in Black by Madeleine St John
- Produced by: Sue Milliken; Allanah Zitserman
- Starring: Angourie Rice; Rachael Taylor; Julia Ormond
- Cinematography: Peter James
- Edited by: Mark Warner
- Music by: Christopher Gordon
- Production companies: Lumila Films Pty Ltd; The Ruskin Company; Ladies in Black SPV Pty Ltd
- Distributed by: Sony Pictures Releasing International; Stage 6 Films
- Release date: 20 September 2018
- Running time: 109 minutes
- Country: Australia
- Language: English
- Budget: $11 million
- Box office: $9.6 million

Ladies in Black is a 2018 Australian comedy-drama film directed by Bruce Beresford, starring Angourie Rice, Rachael Taylor, Julia Ormond, Ryan Corr and Shane Jacobson.

The film is based on the 1993 novel The Women in Black by Madeleine St John, and tells the story of a group of department store employees in 1959 Sydney.

The film was released on 20 September 2018.

== Plot ==
Lisa is hired as a new assistant at Goode's department store in Sydney during the 1959 Christmas season. She makes friends with Fay, who is initially wary of immigrants; Patty, who seeks more attention from her husband; and Magda, an immigrant from Slovenia who introduces her to her other European friends. Patty buys a pink nightdress to get her the attention from her husband she seeks, but he believes he has upset her with his attention and disappears for the season. Magda invites Lisa and Fay to a New Year's Eve party at Magda's house and introduces Fay to Rudi, a Hungarian immigrant who is looking for a wife. Lisa is introduced to Michael, the son of Hungarian immigrants to Australia. A dress Lisa wants to buy is marked down from 150 guineas to 75 guineas during the next summer sale, then later to 50 guineas.

Patty's husband returns and they reconcile when she explains she wants his attention, and Patty soon becomes pregnant. Lisa gets honours on her school leaving exam and applies for a scholarship at Sydney University after getting the approval of her father. Rudi buys a new apartment and proposes to Fay in it. Lisa is upset the dress she likes is no longer on display, but Magda has only hidden it away now so it has been reduced to 35 guineas, which Lisa can now afford. She buys the dress and wears it to a party celebrating her test scores. Magda says she has picked out a location for a store where she will sell high-end fashion. Magda asks Lisa what she will do after finishing her studies at Sydney University and Lisa says she wants to be an actress, or a poet, or a novelist, or maybe all three.

== Cast ==
- Julia Ormond as Magda
- Sepideh Fallah as Rania
- Angourie Rice as Leslie "Lisa" Miles
- Rachael Taylor as Fay Baines
- Ryan Corr as Rudi
- Susie Porter as Mrs. Miles
- Shane Jacobson as Mr. Miles
- Noni Hazlehurst as Miss Cartwright
- Genevieve Lemon as Mrs. Wentworth
- Nicholas Hammond as Mr. Ryder
- Alison McGirr as Patty Williams
- Vincent Perez as Stefan Szombathelyi
- Kate Miller-Heidke as Nightclub Singer
- Jesse Hyde as Michael
- Luke Pegler as Frank
- Danny Adcock as Doctor
- Deborah Kennedy as Myra's Mother

== Production ==
Ladies in Black was twenty years in the making, with writer-director Bruce Beresford attached to the project. Beresford and novelist Madeleine St John, who wrote the book of which the film is an adaptation, were university friends, and Beresford had promised to one day adapt her novel into film since first reading it around its original publication. Ladies in Black is the film that almost got away from Beresford and his friend and producer Sue Milliken, a film the funding agencies kept rejecting. But the X-factor was the involvement of Allanah Zitserman as co-producer. Zitserman's credentials include: producer of three movies, including Russian Doll (2001) and the founder and director of Dungog Film Festival in NSW's Hunter Region. "If it hadn't been for Allanah's dynamism, we'd never have got the money" says Beresford. "She was relentless."

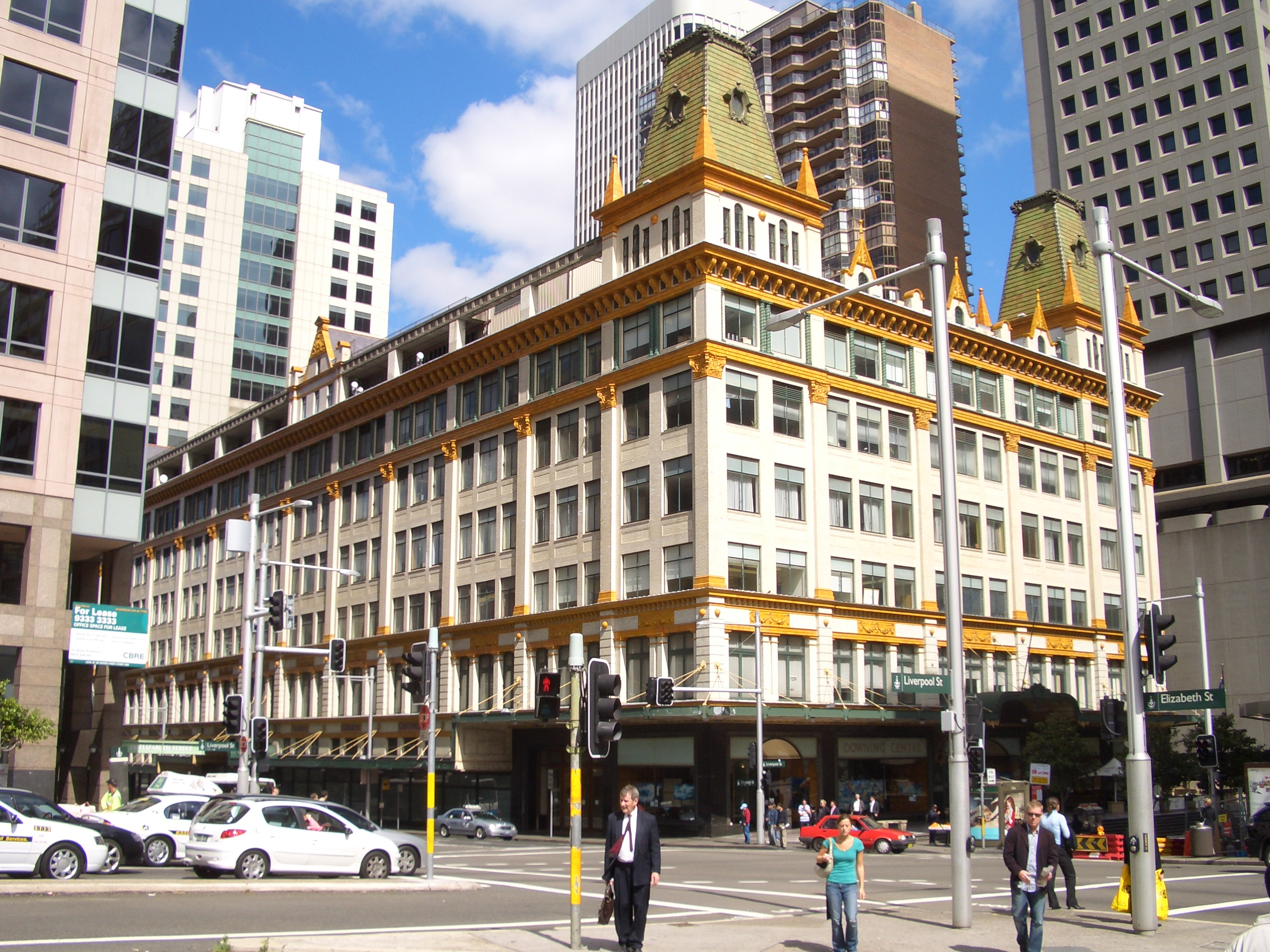
Exterior of the former Mark Foy's store, currently the Downing Centre, was used as "Goode's" department store

In October 2017, the cast was announced, with principal production commencing that month in Sydney, Australia.

The exterior of the fictional "Goode's" department was the former Mark Foy's store, currently the Downing Centre.

== Release ==
=== Box office ===
Prior to release, Ladies in Black was projected to have "a sizable opening weekend and a long run sustained by word-of-mouth and repeat business." On its opening weekend, the film earned $1,865,134 in Australia, placing second behind Johnny English Strikes Again.

=== Critical response ===
Ladies in Black received generally positive reviews from critics. On review aggregation website Rotten Tomatoes, the film has an approval rating of 88% based on 33 reviews, with an average rating of 6.9/10. The website's critics consensus reads: "Ladies in Black gleans socially relevant observations from Australian history with entertaining flair, embroidering a tale that touches on immigration and female empowerment with a fashionable pizazz [sic]."

Neil Young of The Hollywood Reporter said of the film, "Ladies in Black quietly but effectively points out the seldom-stressed positives of immigration and integration, and thus deserves attention far beyond its own native shores". Jake Wilson in The Sydney Morning Herald says the period details "carry the authority of first-hand experience". Australian film critic David Stratton, writing for The Australian, wrote "Ladies in Black may be seen mistakenly as lightweight or slight; it isn't. It brims with subtext and nuance and at the same time succeeds in being a thoroughly enjoyable entertainment."

=== Accolades ===
Award	Category	Subject	Result
AACTA Awards (8th)	Best Film	Sue Milliken	Nominated
AACTA Awards (8th)	Best Film	Allanah Zitserman	Nominated
AACTA Awards (8th)	Best Direction	Bruce Beresford	Nominated
AACTA Awards (8th)	Best Adapted Screenplay	Bruce Beresford	Nominated
AACTA Awards (8th)	Best Adapted Screenplay	Sue Milliken	Nominated
AACTA Awards (8th)	Best Actress	Julia Ormond	Nominated
AACTA Awards (8th)	Best Actress	Angourie Rice	Won
AACTA Awards (8th)	Best Supporting Actress	Noni Hazlehurst	Nominated
AACTA Awards (8th)	Best Cinematography	Peter James	Nominated
AACTA Awards (8th)	Best Editing	Mark Warner	Nominated
AACTA Awards (8th)	Best Original Music Score	Christopher Gordon	Won
AACTA Awards (8th)	Best Costume Design	Wendy Cork	Won
AACTA Awards (8th)	Best Hair and Makeup	Anna Gray	Won
AACTA Awards (8th)	Best Hair and Makeup	Beth Halsted	Won
AACTA Awards (8th)	Best Hair and Makeup	Jen Lamphee	Won
