= Horseplay (2003 film) =

- DVD Cover
- Directed by: Stavros Kazantzidis
- Written by: Stavros Kazantzidis; Allanah Zitserman
- Produced by: Allanah Zitserman executive Bruno Charlesworth; Martin Fabinyi; Michael Gudinski
- Starring: Marcus Graham; Abbie Cornish; Tushka Bergen; Jason Donovan
- Cinematography: David Eggby
- Edited by: Andrew Macneil
- Production companies: Macquarie Film Corporation; Mushroom Pictures
- Distributed by: Buena Vista International
- Release date: 22 May 2003
- Country: Australia
- Language: English
- Box office: AU$140,550 (Australia)

Horseplay is a 2003 Australian Comedy drama film, written & directed by Stavros Kazantzidis and co-written & produced by Allanah Zitserman, starring Abbie Cornish and Marcus Graham. The film is set around the famous Melbourne Cup horse race, in Melbourne, Australia. The film was released on 22 May 2003.

== Plot ==
Horseplay follows Max Mackendrick, and aspiring horse trainer who dreams of winning the Melbourne Cup.

Max is married to Alicia, daughter of a horse trainer. He is banned from a race track. In order to raise some money, he fixes a raise by having the wife of a jockey kidnapped.

== Cast ==
- Marcus Graham as Max MacKendrick
- Tushka Bergen as Alicia Coxhead
- Jason Donovan as Henry
- Abbie Cornish as Becky Wodinski
- Amanda Douge as Grace
- Bill Hunter as Barry Coxhead
- Natalie Mendoza as Jade
- Terence Donovan as Mr Perlman
- Damien Richardson as Gilles
- Krista Vendy
- Alyssa McClelland as Cindy Perlman
- Jacek Koman as Roman

== Production ==
The filmmakers said they were inspired by Jacobean theatre and Ealing comedies of the 1950s. Shooting began on 5 November 2001 and finished seven weeks later.

The film was part of the initial slate of five films from the Macquarie Film Corporation, others including Dirty Deeds, The Nugget, Crackerjack and Takeaway.

== Reception ==
On the SBS Movie Show David Stratton called the film "a disappointment after the generally entertaining Russian Doll. Burdened with too many characters and too many sub-plots, plus too much violence and 4-letter dialogue, the generally excellent actors have little chance to bring the characters to life, added to which just about everyone in the film is extremely unlikable. The tone is uneven, and though there are some amusing scenes, and it's handsomely produced, this is a horse burdened with just too much baggage."

== Soundtrack ==
1. "Would I Lie to You" – Deborah Conway
2. "Every 1's a Winner" – Kate Ceberano
3. "The Thrill Is Gone – Renee Geyer
4. "Everybody" – Abi Tucker
5. "The Payback – James Brown
6. "Now That We've Found Love" – Third World
7. "I See You Baby" – Groove Armada
8. "I Just Wanna Be Loved" – Etherfo
9. "You Took All I Had" – Etherfo
10. "Watch My Lips" – Nigel Westlake
11. "Relax Max" – Nigel Westlake
12. "Would You Kill For It" – Nigel Westlake
13. "Race Fixing" – Nigel Westlake
14. "Till Death Us Do Part" – Nigel Westlake
15. "Torpedo" – Nigel Westlake
16. "The Train Ride to Hell" – Nigel Westlake
17. "Don't Move" – Nigel Westlake
18. "Just Drive" – Nigel Westlake
19. "Horny Ed" – Nigel Westlake
20. "Ecstasy" – Nigel Westlake
21. "He's The Guy" – Nigel Westlake
22. "Case Dismissed" – Nigel Westlake
