= Kath & Kimderella =

2012 Australian comedy film by Ted Emery

- Theatrical release poster
- Directed by: Ted Emery
- Written by: Gina Riley; Jane Turner; Magda Szubanski
- Produced by: Gina Riley; Jane Turner; Rick McKenna; Greg Sitch
- Starring: Jane Turner; Gina Riley; Magda Szubanski; Peter Rowsthorn; Glenn Robbins; Rob Sitch; Richard E. Grant; Barry Humphries
- Cinematography: David Parker
- Edited by: Steven Robinson
- Music by: Kim Green; Andrew Kotatko
- Production companies: Turner Productions; Screen Australia
- Distributed by: Roadshow Films
- Release date: 6 September 2012
- Running time: 86 minutes
- Country: Australia
- Language: English
- Box office: $6,150,771

Kath & Kimderella is a 2012 Australian film. It is a spin-off of the television series Kath & Kim, created by Gina Riley and Jane Turner. It was written by and stars Riley, Turner and Magda Szubanski.

The film was released theatrically in Australia in September 2012 and on Blu-ray and DVD on 23 May 2013. It premiered on Australian television five days later on the Seven Network.

== Plot ==
Kath Day-Knight (Jane Turner) is still living in Fountain Lakes, Melbourne, however Kel (Glenn Robbins) has become a bore after their honeymoon period and Kim (Gina Riley) has moved back in after a divorce from Brett (Peter Rowsthorn), despite receiving marriage counselling from Marion (Marg Downey). While visiting the local pharmacy for wart remover, Kath fills out a form for a chance to win a holiday to the (fictional) "Kingdom of Papilloma" on the heel of Italy (with the real scenes being filmed in Positano). Initially asking Kel, who refuses to travel because of his fear of flying and his dedication to watching the finals of MasterChef, Kath reluctantly decides to take Kim and Sharon (Magda Szubanski) along on the trip. Coincidentally, Prue (Jane Turner) and Trude (Gina Riley) are clandestinely embarking on a holiday to Italy at the same time.

After a 50-plus hour flight, the three arrive in Italy exhausted. Becoming energised again following a stop at a cheap knock-off fashion shop, they arrive in Papilloma to find that their accommodation has closed down. Deciding to take their complimentary trip to the castle which sits atop the hill, they meet page Alain (Richard E. Grant), who Sharon takes a liking to, and King Javier (Rob Sitch), who takes a liking to Kath, and allows all three to stay in the castle, under the impression the three are rich from their imitation-brand clothing and can save him from bankruptcy. Meanwhile, a strange noise can be heard echoing throughout the castle, eyes watch from holes in pictures, and a masked figure, revealed to be the son of Javier, Prince Julio (Erin Mullally), becomes attracted to Kim (thinking that she is royalty from her top bearing the title "Princess").

Javier shows Kath through the town, where it becomes apparent that he is not liked by the poor townspeople, being spat at and having a tomato thrown at him. He later invites the three to an '80s-esque club, where they dance to "Wake Me Up Before You Go-Go" before Javier arrests a gay couple who were dancing, informing Kath that homosexuality is illegal in Papilloma. At a later date, the three are invited to a royal ball, to which Kim wears a large gypsy-inspired pink dress. The masked figure approaches and proposes to Kim, who initially refuses because she thinks his mask is hiding a disfigurement. Disregarding Javier's protests, Julio unmasks himself, revealing a handsome face, blond hair hidden by a wig and his crooked teeth to be fake. The invited townspeople gasp as it becomes apparent from his appearance he is not the queen's son. Kim then accepts (stating that she has "done worse"), and the imminent royal wedding makes worldwide news.

The same night, a fire is noticed on one of the castle's turrets. Rushing inside, the royals, along with Kath, Kim and Sharon, discover that the queen has appeared and set the castle on fire from Kim and Sharon's bedroom using Kim's hair straightener. However, the queen is suddenly killed by a falling chandelier and the fire is put out; Javier puts the girls' minds at ease when he explains that the queen was locked up because she was "crazy", jealous of his attraction to Kath and the source of the noises made around the castle.

Back in Australia, Kel is watching MasterChef with Brett when a news update from Papilloma about the royal wedding interrupts the show, and Brett realises it is Kim getting hitched. Javier is then shown grabbing Kath's backside, and Kel thinks she is having an affair. The pair decide to fly to Papilloma, but not before Kel receives hypnosis therapy from Marion to combat his fear of flying, which turns strangely sexual and programs him with the phrase "Tray tables up". While on the flight with Brett and Epponnee-Rae (Morghyne de Vries), now a spoiled brat who participates in child beauty pageants, Kel hears the phrase during the announcement that the flight will soon be touching down. In a trance, he makes his way to the toilet, where he undresses before later collecting his luggage, opens the sealed door (with the plane having just pulled into the airport), triggering the evacuation slide and leaves.

In Papilloma, Kath confronts Javier about being a despot, who rules Papilloma as an absolute monarch. Kel interrupts Javier attempting to put the moves on Kath, and the two engage in a sword duel for her affections; Kel wins and Javier flees. Kim and Sharon become lost before the wedding after exploring their shared bedroom's closet, with Kim having been sabotaged and attempted to be killed by maid Isabella (Jessica De Gouw), who loves Julio and earlier had been teased by Kim. After Kim and Sharon come across a disco-like chamber, it is revealed that Alain has kept all of the imprisoned townspeople and homosexuals there, and they are soon freed, as Kath and Kel, making their way to the wedding, discover the lost Kim and Sharon. Kim laments her messy hair, however Kath, in a fantasy moment, practices her amateur TAFE-learnt "wicca" on Kim, giving her a makeover (but not before turning her into Dame Edna).

With the four finally arriving at the wedding, Epponnee-Rae and Brett (who made their way to Papilloma with Prue and Trude, who are also in attendance) interrupt Kim and Julio's vows, and set off a heated argument in which it is revealed that Kim is not actually royalty, and that Julio (who had earlier revealed that his mother is Elle Macpherson) is not Javier's son, as he fathered no children. Gary Poole (Mick Molloy, who earlier appeared in a flashback), Kath's ex-husband and Kim's father, is revealed to be an extradited royal descendant, therefore making Kath a queen and Kim a princess. Alain also confesses he was "forced" to make love to the queen, and fathered a daughter, the maid Isabella, who professes her love for Prince Julio.

Following the unsuccessful wedding, the royals (including Kath and Kim) along with Kel and Brett appear on a balcony above the town square, where the townspeople chant for food. Javier decides to relinquish some of his power (allowing Papilloma to become a democracy), and a party with plentiful food is later thrown, which the townspeople attend. At the party, Sharon passionately kisses Alain, who tells her he cannot return her affections because she is gay (which had been hinted at throughout the film, referencing Szubanski's real-life coming out), leaving her confused and disheartened before she meets Stephanie (Tasneem Roc), who shares her interest in golf and netball. Kath and Kim later discuss returning to Australia after their eventful, fairy tale-like holiday.

== Cast ==
- Jane Turner as Kath Day-Knight and Prue
- Gina Riley as Kim Craig and Trude
- Magda Szubanski as Sharon Strzelecki
- Glenn Robbins as Kel Knight
- Peter Rowsthorn as Brett Craig
- Rob Sitch as King Javier of Papilloma
- Richard E. Grant as Alain
- Barry Humphries as Dame Edna Everage
- Alex Perry as himself
- Marg Downey as Marion
- Nicholas Bell as Priest
- Glenn Butcher as Sergio
- George Calombaris as himself
- Jessica De Gouw as Isabella
- Julie Forsyth as Queen Christina
- Bryce Hardy as Bryce Waterhouse (flight attendant)
- Mick Molloy as Gary Poole
- Erin Mullally as Prince Julio
- Robert Ratti as Tony
- Tasneem Roc as Stephanie Murdoch
- Lisa Spurrell as Cloaked Person
- Mark Trevorrow as Marko
- Frank Woodley as Castle Translator

== Production ==
The film was originally titled Kath & Kim – The Filum. The title was later changed with Riley stating that the new title reflects the elements of the storyline of Kath and Kim in a fractured fairytale. The holiday scenes were shot in Positano, Italy and filming took a total of two weeks.

== Reception ==
The film opened at number one at the Australian box office, taking in $2.1 million. It was the second highest opening for an Australian film in 2012, behind The Sapphires.

As of July 2020, 26% of the nineteen reviews compiled by Rotten Tomatoes are positive, with an average rating of 3.64/10. ABC Television's film review series At the Movies rated the film two stars out of five; critic David Stratton, who reviewed the film, admitted he was not a fan of the television show that inspired it.

== Box office ==
As of 16 October 2012 the film had grossed $6,150,771 at the Australian box office.
