= List of awards and nominations received by SeaChange =

Wentworth awards and nominations
Awards and nominations
Award	Wins	Nominations
ARIA Music Awards	0	1
Australian Film Institute	3	23
Australian Guild of Screen Composers	1	1
Logie Awards	8	19

Totals (Note: Certain award groups do not simply award one winner. They acknowledge several different recipients, have runners-up, and have third place. Since this is a specific recognition and is different from losing an award, runner-up mentions are considered wins in this award tally. For simplification and to avoid errors, each award in this list has been presumed to have had a prior nomination.)
- Wins: 12
- Nominations: 44

SeaChange is an Australian drama television series that aired on ABC (Australian Broadcasting Corporation) from 1998 to 2000 and on Nine Network, where it was revived in 2019.

The series is the successful recipient of several awards and nominations, most notably from the Australian Film Institute (now the AACTA Awards) and the Logie Awards, while it has also been awarded for its music and score.

== ARIA Music Awards ==
Year	Category	Nominee	Result	Ref
2001	Best Original Soundtrack, Cast or Show Album	Richard Pleasance (Note: ARIA Music Award nomination – Best Original Soundtrack, Cast or Show Album – for "The Very Best of SeaChange".)	Nominated	

== Australian Film Institute ==
Year	Category	Nominee	Result	Ref
1998	Best Episode in a Television Drama Series	Sally Ayre Smith (Note: AFI Award nomination – Best Episode in a Television Drama Series – for "Stormy Weather" (season 1, episode 7).)	Nominated	
1998	Best Screenplay in a Television Drama	Deb Cox (Note: AFI Award nomination – Best Screenplay in a Television Drama – for "Stormy Weather" (season 1, episode 7).)	Nominated	
1998	Best Actor in a Leading Role in a Television Drama	David Wenham (Note: AFI Award nomination – Best Actor in a Leading Role in a Television Drama – for "Balls and Friggin' Good Luck" (season 1, episode 9).)	Nominated	
1999	Best Episode in a Television Drama Series	Sally Ayre Smith (Note: AFI Award nomination – Best Episode in a Television Drama Series – for "Manna from Heaven" (season 2, episode 8).)	Nominated	
1999	Best Episode in a Television Drama Series	Sally Ayre Smith (Note: AFI Award nomination – Best Episode in a Television Drama Series – for "Playing with Fire" (season 2, episode 9).)	Nominated	
1999	Best Episode in a Television Drama Series	Sally Ayre Smith (Note: AFI Award nomination – Best Episode in a Television Drama Series – for "Law and Order" (season 2, episode 13).)	Nominated	
1999	Best Screenplay in a Television Drama	Deb Cox, Andrew Knight (Note: AFI Award nomination – Best Screenplay in a Television Drama – for "Manna from Heaven" (season 2, episode 8).)	Nominated	
1999	Best Screenplay in a Television Drama	Deb Cox (Note: AFI Award nomination – Best Screenplay in a Television Drama – for "Law and Order" (season 2, episode 13).)	Nominated	
1999	Best Actor in a Leading Role in a Television Drama	John Howard (Note: AFI Award nomination – Best Actor in a Leading Role in a Television Drama – for "Law and Order" (season 2, episode 13).)	Nominated	
1999	Best Actress in a Leading Role in a Television Drama	Jill Forster (Note: AFI Award recipient – Best Actress in a Leading Role in a Television Drama – for "Manna from Heaven" (season 2, episode 8).)	Won	
2000	Best Performance by an Actress in a Guest Role in a Television Drama Series	Natalia Novikova (Note: AFI Award nomination – Best Performance by an Actress in a Guest Role in a Television Drama Series – for "How Much Greener was My Neighbour's Valley" (season 3, episode 2).)	Nominated	
2000	Best Performance by an Actress in a Guest Role in a Television Drama Series	Deborra-Lee Furness (Note: AFI Award nomination – Best Performance by an Actress in a Guest Role in a Television Drama Series – for "Hungi Jury" (season 3, episode 3).)	Nominated	
2000	Best Actor in a Leading Role in a Television Drama	Tom Long (Note: AFI Award nomination – Best Actor in a Leading Role in a Television Drama – for "How Much Greener was My Neighbour's Valley" (season 3, episode 2).)	Nominated	
2000	Best Episode in a Television Drama Series	Sally Ayre Smith (Note: AFI Award nomination – Best Episode in a Television Drama Series – for "Hungi Jury" (season 3, episode 3).)	Nominated	
2001	Best Direction in Television Drama	Stuart McDonald (Note: AFI Award nomination – Best Direction in a Television Drama – for "I Name Thee Bay of Pearls" (season 3, episode 8).)	Nominated	
2001	Best Actress in a Leading Role in a Television Drama	Sigrid Thornton (Note: AFI Award nomination – Actress in a Leading Role in a Television Drama – for Season 3.)	Nominated	
2001	Best Screenplay in a Television Drama	Hannie Rayson, Andrea Denholm (Note: AFI Award nomination – Best Screenplay in a Television Drama – "Love in the Time of Coleridge" (season 3, episode 11).)	Nominated	
2001	Best Screenplay in a Television Drama	Andrew Knight, Andrea Denholm (Note: AFI Award nomination – Best Screenplay in a Television Drama – "I Name Thee Bay of Pearls" (season 3, episode 8).)	Nominated	
2001	Best Actor in a Leading Role in a Television Drama	William McInnes (Note: AFI Award nomination – Best Actor in a Leading Role in a Television Drama – for Season 3.)	Nominated	
2001	Best Actor in a Leading Role in a Television Drama	John Howard (Note: AFI Award nomination – Best Actor in a Leading Role in a Television Drama – for Season 3.)	Nominated	
2001	Best Episode in a Television Drama Series	Sally Ayre Smith (Note: AFI Award nomination – Best Episode in a Television Drama Series – for "Half Life" (season 3, episode 13).)	Nominated	
2001	Best Episode in a Television Drama Series	Sally Ayre Smith (Note: AFI Award recipient – Best Episode in a Television Drama Series – for "I Name Thee Bay of Pearls" (season 3, episode 8).)	Won	
2001	Best Actress in a Leading Role in a Television Drama	Kerry Armstrong (Note: AFI Award recipient – Actress in a Leading Role in a Television Drama – for Season 3.)	Won	

== Australian Guild of Screen Composers ==
Year	Category	Nominee	Result	Ref
1999	Best Original Song Composed for a Feature Film, Telemovie, TV Series or Mini-Series	Richard Plesance (Note: Australian Screen Music Award recipient – Best Original Song Composed for a Feature Film, Telemovie, TV Series or Mini-Series – for "SeaChange Theme Song", featuring Wendy Morrison.)	Won	

== Logie Awards ==
Year	Category	Nominee	Result	Ref
1999	Most Outstanding Actress	Sigrid Thornton (Note: Logie Award nomination – Most Outstanding Actress – for Season 1.)	Nominated	
1999	Most Outstanding Actor	David Wenham (Note: Logie Award recipient – Most Outstanding Actor – for Season 1 (tied with Tony Martin for Wildside.)	Won	
1999	Most Outstanding Drama Series	SeaChange (Note: Logie Award recipient – Most Outstanding Drama Series – for Season 1.)	Won	
2000	Most Popular Personality on Australian Television	Sigrid Thornton (Note: Gold Logie Award nomination – Most Popular Personality on Australian Television – for Season 2.)	Nominated	
2000	Most Popular Actress	Sigrid Thornton (Note: Logie Award nomination – Most Popular Actress – for Season 2.)	Nominated	
2000	Most Outstanding Actress	Sigrid Thornton (Note: Logie Award recipient – Most Outstanding Actress – for Season 2.)	Won	
2000	Most Outstanding Actress	Kerry Armstrong (Note: Logie Award nomination – Most Popular Actress – for Season 2.)	Nominated	
2000	Most Outstanding Actor	William McInnes (Note: Logie Award recipient – Most Popular Actor – for Season 2.)	Won	
2000	Most Outstanding Actor	John Howard (Note: Logie Award nomination – Most Popular Actor – for Season 2.)	Nominated	
2000	Most Outstanding Drama Series	SeaChange (Note: Logie Award recipient – Most Outstanding Drama Series – for Season 2.)	Won	
2001	Most Popular Personality on Australian Television	Sigrid Thornton (Note: Gold Logie Award nomination – Most Popular Personality on Australian Television – for Season 3.)	Nominated	
2001	Most Popular Actress	Sigrid Thornton (Note: Logie Award nomination – Most Popular Actress – for Season 3.)	Nominated	
2001	Most Popular Actor	William McInnis (Note: Logie Award nomination – Most Popular Actor – for Season 3.)	Nominated	
2001	Most Outstanding Actress	Sigrid Thornton (Note: Logie Award nomination – Most Outstanding Actress – for Season 3.)	Nominated	
2001	Most Outstanding Actress	Kerry Armstrong (Note: Logie Award recipient – Most Outstanding Actress – for Season 3.)	Won	
2001	Most Outstanding Actor	William McInnis (Note: Logie Award nomination – Most Outstanding Actor – for Season 3.)	Nominated	
2001	Most Outstanding Actor	John Howard (Note: Logie Award recipient – Most Outstanding Actor – for Season 3.)	Won	
2001	Most Popular Program	SeaChange (Note: Logie Award recipient – Most Popular Drama Program – for Season 3.)	Nominated	
2001	Most Outstanding Drama Series	SeaChange (Note: Logie Award recipient – Most Outstanding Drama Series – for Season 3.)	Won	
