= Margaret Roc =

Australian children's writer

- Born: 14 July 1945 (age 80); Stirling, Scotland
- Education: University of Sydney; University of Technology Sydney; University of Western Sydney
- Occupations: Author; Editor; Teacher
- Known for: Children's fiction and non-fiction
- Notable work: Little Koala; Australia's Critically Endangered Animals

Margaret Roc (born 14 July 1945) is an Australian author, co-author and editor of over fifty published fiction and non-fiction books for children and teachers.

== Biography ==
Roc was born in Stirling, Scotland, the youngest of three children. She immigrated to Australia with her family at age eight in 1953.

Roc graduated in 1969 from the University of Sydney majoring in Psychology and Government and subsequently attained her Diploma in Education in 1970, also at the University of Sydney. She obtained her Remedial Teacher's Certificate in Special Education from the Kuring-gai College of Advanced Education (now part of the University of Technology, Sydney) in 1974. Other qualifications include her Masters of Arts (Education) in 1975 from the University of Sydney, her Masters of Arts (Creative Writing) in 2001 from the University of Western Sydney. In 2004 Roc obtained her Graduate Diploma of Information from the University of Technology, Sydney.

Roc has worked as a teacher, special education teacher and teacher-librarian at a number of inner Sydney public schools and continues to teach in Sydney.

Roc has an ongoing collaboration with author and editor Kathleen Hawke. Their books Australia's Critically Endangered Animals and Australia's Deadly and Dangerous Animals and Plants are on the booklist for the Premier's Reading Challenge, a literacy initiative designed to promote reading to children.

Roc is a member of The Australian Society of Authors and the Society of Children's Book Writers and Illustrators.

Roc married husband John in 1965. She has two children: James Roc, and actress Tasneem Roc.

== Selected bibliography ==
=== Children's non-fiction ===
- Kangaroos (Reed Education, 1980)
- Australian Communities (Methuen, series with Kathleen Hawke, 1982)

Sheep Property
Mining Town
Rural City
River Towns

- New Technologies (Methuen, series with John Roc, 1984)

Computers at Work
Computers and Leisure

- Living and Growing (Macmillan, series co-author with Kathleen Hawke, 1991)

Babyhood
Early Childhood
Childhood
Adolescence
Adulthood
Old Age

- Fair Go for Everyone (Macmillan, co-author 1991)
- Platypus(Macmillan, 1993)
- Butterfly (Macmillan, 1993)
- Dolphin (Macmillan, 1993)
- Frog (Macmillan, 1993)
- Cicada (Macmillan, 1994)
- Dog (Macmillan, 1994)
- Koala (Macmillan, 1994)
- Fish (Macmillan, 1994)
- Australian Habitats (Macmillan, series co-author with Kathleen Hawke, 1998)

Deserts
Rainforests
Wetlands
Oceans
Temperate Forests
Grasslands

- Australia's Critically Endangered Animals (Heinemann, 2006 with Kathleen Hawlke)
- Australia's Deadly and Dangerous Animals and Plants (Heinemann, 2006 with Kathleen Hawke)

=== Children's fiction ===
- I Love... (Methuen, series with Kathleen Hawke, 1979)

I Love Butterflies
I Love Going to the Beach
I Love Chairs that Are Big and Soft
I Love Running When I Take Off My Shoes

- Shakespeare Readers (Shakespeare Head Press series, 1985)

Splash!
Kick Off!
Sing, Clap, Play a Tune!
Saddle Up!
Bone for Lady
Miffy
Cubs and Campfires
Brownies in Action

- Oodles of Noodles (Hodder & Stoughten, 1987)
- Little Koala (HarperCollins, 1989)
- Little Koala Finds a Friend (HarperCollins, 1997)

== Contributor ==
- Bronze Swagman Book of Bush Verse 19th Edition (1990)
