= Kain O'Keeffe =

Australian actor

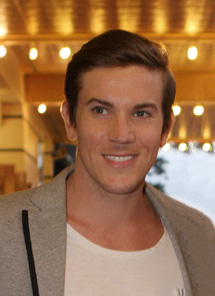
- O'Keeffe at the 2011 premiere of 33 Postcards
- Occupation: Actor
- Years active: 2002–present

Kain O'Keeffe is an Australian actor, known for his appearances in Australian television dramas and minor roles in films.

== Career ==
Between 2003 and 2005 O'Keefe filmed two guest appearances in the Seven Network television series All Saints. In 2005, O'Keeffe made his film debut aged fourteen in Swimming Upstream, starring as a Harold Jr. O'Keeffe then secured a regular role Blue Water High as Guy Spender, after previously appearing in a guest role as another character called Ryan. O'Keeffe said that he did not mind filming more than one role in the same series, because he felt the industry was "quite small". He said that he hoped to gain more acting roles from starring in the programme. O'Keeffe also starred in the television pilot of television series Resistance, working alongside Nicholas Hope and Jane Badler. In 2009, it was announced that O'Keeffe had joined the cast of Home and Away playing the role of Brendan Austin as part of the serial's new family. O'Keeffe was working alongside his former Blue Water High colleague, Rebecca Breeds. He also starred in the film I Wish I Were Stephanie V, which went on to win "Best Feature Film" at INDIE FEST USA and gained further distribution in 2011.

ABC later picked up the rights to Resistance and went the programme went into pre-production in 2011, with a planned airdate of late 2012.

== Filmography ==
Acting
Year	Title	Role	Notes
2002	Young Lions	Thug #1	
2003	Swimming Upstream	Young Harold Jr.	
2003	All Saints	Todd Sorenson	
2004	Fireflies	Kieran Sharp	Regular role
2005	All Saints	Jamie Stoner	
2005	Blue Water High	Ryan	Guest role
2005	Home and Away	Callan Sherman	Season 18 (guest role)
2007	Pirate Islands: The Lost Treasure of Fiji	Tyler Bradden	Regular role
2007	McLeod's Daughters	Ross	
2008	Burden	William Johnson	Short film
2008	Out of the Blue	Callan 'Blade' Moore	
2008	Blue Water High	Guy Spender	Regular role
2008	Resistance	Brandon	Pilot episode
2009–10	Home and Away	Brendan Austin	Seasons 22–23 (recurring role)
2009	I Wish I Were Stephanie V	Brendan	
2009	The 7th Hunt	Chris Roberts	
2010	Underbelly: The Golden Mile	Westie #1	
2010	Packed to the Rafters	Liam	Guest role
2011	33 Postcards	Dave	
2012	Neighbours	Vaughn Redden	
2017	Hooked	Busboy	

Other work
Year	Title	Credited work			Notes
Year	Title	Director	Writer	Editor	Notes
2011	Scent	Yes	Yes	Yes	Short film
2015	Willam: Thick Lights (feat. Latrice)	Yes			Music video
2016	Willam: Uck Foff	Yes		Yes	Music video
2016	Christmas Queens				Co-director
2017	The AAA Girls (feat. Alaska Thunderfuck, Willam and Courtney Act: AAA)	Yes		Yes	Music video
2017	The AAA Girls: Heather	Yes			Music video
2017	The AAA Girls: Meet & Greet	Yes		Yes	Music video
2018–21	William's Beatdown	Yes		Yes	2 episodes (director), 1 episode (editor)
2018	Willam: Aileen			Yes	Music video
2020	Willam: Derrick	Yes		Yes	Music video
2019	Exposed				Cinematographer (TV series)
2022	Access All Areas: The AAA Girls Tour	Yes		Yes	
2022	Dr. Jackie			Yes	1 episode
2022	Alaska Thunderfuck: All That She Wants	Yes		Yes	Music video
2023	Sissy That Talk Show with Joseph Shepherd				Cinematographer (8 episodes)
