= Tasneem Roc =

Australian actress (born 1978)

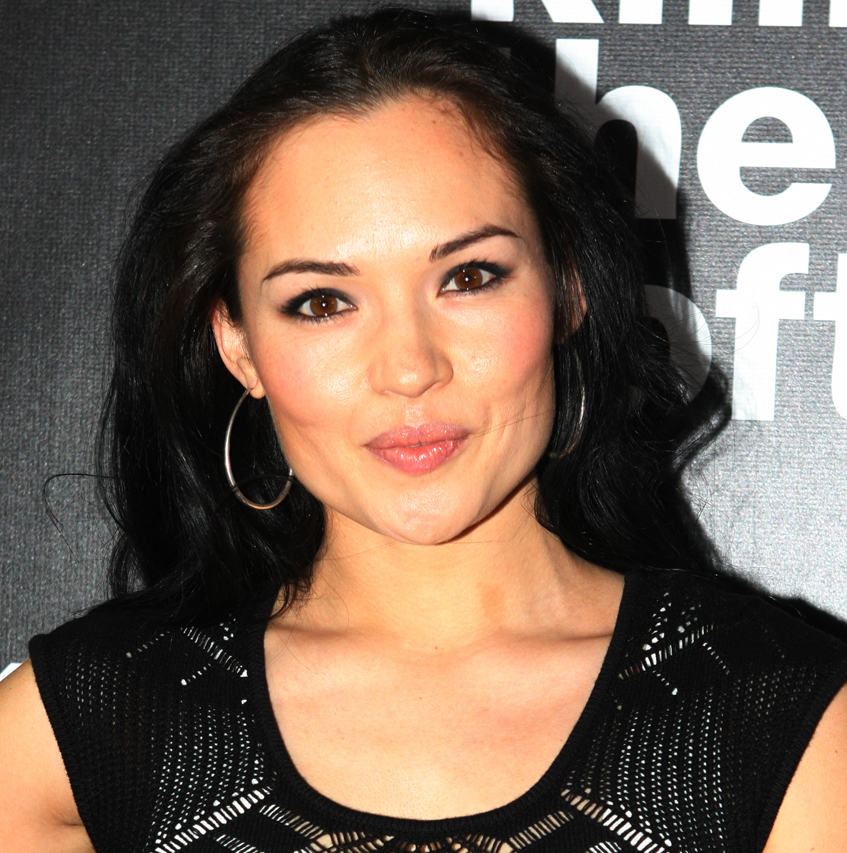
- Roc at the Killing Them Softly Australian premiere in September 2012.
- Born: 11 December 1978 (age 47); Sydney, Australia
- Education: Turramurra High School
- Alma mater: University of Sydney
- Occupation: Actress
- Website: tasneemroc.com

Tasneem Roc (born 11 December 1978) is an Australian actress of film and television.

== Early life and education ==
Tasneem Roc was born in Sydney. Roc's mother, writer Margaret Roc, is from Scotland and her father, John Roc, is a Karen from Myanmar. Her brother is James Roc.

Roc attended Turramurra High School and went on to study acting at the Australian Theatre for Young People, located in Woolloomooloo (a suburb of Sydney). She graduated from the University of Sydney.

== Career ==
Roc began her career in 1997 on the Australian television drama series Heartbreak High in season six as activist high-school student Thania Saya.

She then appeared in a guest role on the ABC drama series Head Start in 2001 as Skye Quinn, the disruptive daughter of Garrett Quinn. She appeared as a guest on the UK Sky TV sports drama series Dream Team in 2001–03 as home-wrecking U.S. professional tennis player Shannon Eden-Childs. She also appeared as victim of crime Tina Chang in a guest role on ABC TV's legal dramedy Crownies in 2011.

Roc appeared, in 2007–2021, in the award-winning SBS mini-series East West 101 as Amina Malik – a role for which she learnt some Arabic, and Islamic prayers – as the wife of Muslim detective Zane Malik. The cast was presented with the award for Outstanding Performance by an Ensemble Cast at the 2012 Equity Awards.

She appeared as British journalist Stephanie Murdoch in Kath & Kimderella, a 2012 comedy film based on the television comedy series Kath & Kim.

Roc appeared in Reef Doctors, the Australian drama produced by Jonathan M. Shiff that premiered on Network Ten on 9 June 2013. The show stars Lisa McCune as Sam Stewart, the leader of a team of doctors serving the remote Hope Island Clinic on the Great Barrier Reef. Roc played nurse practitioner Olivia Shaw.

She appeared as Yael in Josh Lawson's 2014 debut comedy film The Little Death and in the 2015 Seven Network miniseries Winter, starring Rebecca Gibney and Peter O'Brien.

In 2016, Roc appeared as Nerissa on the children's adventure television series Mako: Island of Secrets and in 2024 as Camala in the romantic comedy film Mother of the Bride .

== Filmography ==
=== Film ===
| Year | Title | Role | Notes |
|---|---|---|---|
| 2006 | Duck Man | | Short film |
| 2009 | The 7th Hunt | Becky (The Hand) | |
| 2011 | Burning Man | Oncology Nurse | |
| 2012 | Not Suitable for Children | Miranda | |
| 2012 | Kath & Kimderella | Stephanie Murdoch | |
| 2014 | The Little Death | Yael | |
| 2014 | Housemates | Miki | Short film |
| 2017 | Falling | Rebecca | Short film |
| 2020 | Love and Monsters | Anna Lucia | |
| 2022 | Christmas Ransom | Kate (Young Mum) | |
| 2024 | Mother of the Bride | Camala | |

=== Television ===
| Year | Title | Role | Notes |
|---|---|---|---|
| 1997 | Heartbreak High | Mariel | Episode: "6.32" |
| 1999 | Heartbreak High | Thania Saya | Main role (season 7) |
| 2001 | Head Start | Skye Quinn | Guest role (5 episodes) |
| 2002–03 | Dream Team | Shannon Eden-Childs | Guest role (6 episodes) |
| 2007–2011 | East West 101 | Amina Malik | Supporting role |
| 2008 | Out of the Blue | Suze | Episode: "1.94" |
| 2009 | Packed to the Rafters | Female Reporter | Episode: "Losing the Touch" |
| 2009–10 | Home and Away | Suzy Sudiro | Guest role (7 episodes) |
| 2010 | Sea Patrol | Neysa | Episode: "Crocodile Tears" |
| 2010 | Spirited | Viola Take | Guest role (season 1) |
| 2011 | Crownies | Tina Chang | Episodes: "1.7", "1.12" |
| 2013 | Reef Doctors | Olivia Shaw | Main role |
| 2015 | Winter | Emma Tan | Episode: "Gone Girl" |
| 2016 | Mako: Island of Secrets | Nerissa | Episodes: "Letting Go", "Homecoming" |
| 2017 | Here Come the Habibs | UN Woman | Episode: "Lockdown" |
| 2017 | Cleverman | Sarah Gottlieb | Episode: "Skin" |
| 2017 | Unsynced | Tonya Cummins | Episodes: "Smack in the Water", "Transient", "Cummins vs. International Games Committee" |
| 2018 | Harrow | Jill McCloud | Episodes: "Finis Vitae Sed Non Amoris", "Non Sum Qualis Eram" |
| 2018-2019 | Rake | Li-Ming Wu | Episodes: "5.4", "5.7", "5.8" |
| 2019 | Doctor Doctor | Amelia | Episode: "Oh Baby" |
| 2019 | The Commons | Zahra Malik | Episode: "1.3" |
| 2021 | Reckoning | Prosecutor | Episode: "Best Life" |
| 2021 | The Bureau of Magical Things | Dr Apinya Surinat | Recurring role (season 2) |
| 2021 | Total Control | Mima Scot | 1 episode |
| 2022 | The PM's Daughter | Presenter | 1 episode |
| 2022 | God's Favorite Idiot | Maggie | 1 episode |
| 2023 | North Shore | Claire Buchanan | 1 episode |
