= Dungog Film Festival =

Former event in New South Wales, Australia

- Genre: not-for-profit, arts organization
- Location: Hunter Region town of Dungog
- Established: 2007

The Dungog Film Festival was an annual event held in the Hunter Region town of Dungog. The Dungog Film Festival was a not-for-profit arts organization that was dedicated to celebrating and promoting the Australian screen industry. The festival provided education of the Australian film and TV industry through a range of initiatives. Some proceeds of the festival have gone towards preserving the James Theatre. The festival aimed to support the Australian Film and TV Industry in a non-competitive environment that exclusively showcased Australian screen content.

Dungog Film Festival showcased feature films, short films, television, documentaries, Australian classics and music videos. The festival also had education program, including workshops, seminars, master classes with prominent directors, and the In The Raw script readings for television series, miniseries and feature films scripts. It was considered the biggest festival of Australian cinema in the world, as well as the largest short film festival in Australia. Screenings took place in local venues including the iconic James Theatre and the RSL auditorium. The 2010 festival attracted over 9,000 people and national media coverage including Sunrise, NBN News and Network Ten.

The Dungog Film Festival has been replaced by the Dungog Festival, an annual event that includes a major film component which in 2016 included a short film competition, a showcase program of documentaries and feature films, and a series of filmmaker workshops and panels with a range of screen industry guest speakers.

== History ==
=== Inception ===
The festival was established in 2007 by film-makers Allanah Zitserman (Festival Director) and Stavros Kazantzidis (Managing Director). Their aim was to foster a greater appreciation for Australian films among Australian audiences, strengthen bonds within the Australian film and television communities, and present a cultural experience in a distinctly Australian rural setting. Over the years, film luminaries, emerging talent, actors, film buffs, students, industry executives and journalists attended Dungog in increasing numbers. Film industry professionals enjoyed the Festival because it offered a world-class festival experience with a laid-back and intimate atmosphere.

The last film festival was held in 2012. A new event, the Dungog Festival, with a focus on film, food and fresh air, was established in 2014 and is held annually, run by the Dungog Arts Foundation.

=== Dungog ===
Dungog is located 215 km (134 mi) north of Sydney, 76 km (47 mi) north of Newcastle and 52 km (32 mi) north of Maitland in the Hunter Region of New South Wales. It is historically known for its timber, cattle and dairy produce and is also home to the James Theatre, the oldest still operating purpose-built cinema in Australia. Prior to white settlement the area was populated by the Gringai tribe, who called the region "Tunkok" or "Tungog", or "the place of thinly wooded hills" in the Awabakal dialect. The area is also renowned for its magnificent cedar trees, which were used in the construction of the Sydney Opera House. Every year Dungog transforms during the film festival into a hub of film-makers and tourists.

=== James Theatre ===
The James Theatre is the oldest operating purpose-built cinema in Australia. Opened in December 1912 by the Dungog Electric Light Company the site was originally used as an open-air theatre. Subsequently, under the control of James Stuart (hence the James Theatre) by 1914 it had been roofed and in 1930 it underwent extensive reconstruction, equipping it for talkies. It is believed that the Spanish-style façade, which gives the theatre its flair, was also added in the 1930s. In 1976 the Dungog Shire Council (DSC) acquired the building as a Community Centre and the cinema operation continued under the expert care of Ken Reeve, a regional cinema hero, until his retirement in 2007. The cinema was run by the Hobson family for a number of years until operations were taken over by volunteers. In 2011 The Friends of the James Theatre Incorporated was established to assist in fundraising ventures to support the ongoing maintenance of and improvements to The James. In 2025 there are over 35 volunteers supporting the various aspects of running a theatre including Projection, Sound and Lighting, Promotion/Marketing and Front of House.

== Raising awareness for Australian films ==
Media coverage of the festival generates important public relations for Australian films. Dungog Film Festival acts as a platform for these films to gain much-needed exposure in the market. Road Train (Xavier Samuel, Sophie Lowe, Bob Morley, Georgina Haig) screened at the 2010 Festival and was initially unable to obtain a theatrical release. However, due to the media coverage the festival was able to generate for the film, a distribution deal and funding were secured. In 2009, the Dungog campaign for Unfinished Sky kicked off its national release. The film went on to earn the second highest box office result for an Australian film that year. The Jammed, initially heading straight to DVD, was picked up for a theatrical release at the 2007 festival by John L. Simpson Producer and CEO of Titan View. It went on to be a box office hit and won the IF Best Film and Screenplay Awards that year.

== Education programs ==
The Dungog Film Festival's education programs include the Student Program, In The Raw - live script reads, Master Classes, Workshops, Seminars and Meet the Filmmaker sessions (in collaboration with iTunes). Other programs are Speed Auditioning, Rural Schools Program and the Dungog Collection on iTunes. Dungog Film Festival's Rural School's program gives students in regional communities the opportunity to be mentored by industry professionals in screen arts. DFF has also run workshops on film editing, visual effects and postproduction run by volunteers from the University of Newcastle. In 2010, Dungog Film Festival also partnered with Jennifer's Words and managed a mentoring program where students from Dungog High School scripted, filmed and edited an advertisement, which was screened at the closing night of the Festival.

== In the Raw ==
The festival's In the Raw script development program presents live script readings of some of Australia's new screenplays, read by actors. It offers an opportunity for audiences to witness first-hand the development of some yet-to-be produced screenplays, as well as the chance to actively take part in a discussion regarding their development.

This program allows writers, actors and producers to road test their work on a real audience before heading into production. Two screenplays previously read at "In the Raw" have gone into production: Pauline Chan's Mei Mei (starring Claudia Karvan and Guy Pearce) and Julia Leigh's Sleeping Beauty (starring Emily Browning, Michael Dorman and Ewen Leslie).

== Speed auditioning ==
In its inaugural year, 2010, "Speed Auditioning" had an overwhelming response from young actors around Australia. This program offers budding talent the chance to get their name up in lights, in a "so you think you can act" competition. Actors brave a two-minute, open, speedy audition, with only ten finalists invited to the festival to compete in the final round. At the festival, the finalists chose a genre and were given a scene to read to camera. They also performed the scene live for the judges. These included Jeremy Hartley Sims, Nadia Tass, Brendan Cowell, Rowan Woods, Denise Roberts, Cameron Daddo and CEO of Paramount Mike Selwyn. This program gives young actors an unparalleled chance to shine in front of the Australian film industry and a wide audience.

== Community involvement ==
Each year young people from the local community join up with the festival's volunteer program. During the 2010 festival over 150 community members aged from 16 to 75 participated in the program. Local businesses along the main street, Dowling Street, become involved in the festival's annual window competition. Retail businesses along the main street dresses their shop-front window to reflect an Australian film. Prizes are awarded to the most creative design. As well as working with students from the local high school on film-making workshops, Dungog Film Festival provides assistance to the Council run visitor information Centre in order to deal with the increase of visitors during the festival.

== Growth of the festival ==
The 2010 Festival saw over 9,000 people attend over four days, an increase on the 2009 attendance figure of 6,500. The number of films screened during the festival increased from 57 films in 2007 to 164 films in 2010. The number of venues utilized by the Dungog Film Festival has also increased, and the reach of the Festival has broadened through partnerships with iTunes, AFTRS, NIDA, and Newcastle University.

== Directors ==
- Allanah Zitserman - Founder and Festival Director
- Stavros Kazantzidis - Founder and Managing Editor
