= Pamela Gordon (actress) =

American actress

- Born: April 8, 1937; Pittsburgh, Pennsylvania, U.S.
- Died: September 21, 2003 (aged 66); Los Angeles, California, U.S.
- Resting place: Mount Sinai Memorial Park Cemetery
- Education: Carnegie Mellon University
- Occupation: actress
- Spouse: Marc Wedner
- Children: 2

Pamela Gordon Wedner (stage name Pamela Gordon, 8 April 1937 – 21 September 2003) was an American film and stage actress. She was particularly known for her short height and deep, gravelly voice.

Born in Pittsburgh, Pennsylvania, Gordon acted in local theater as a child. She attended Bennington College, and then Carnegie Mellon University where she received a B.A. in dramatic arts.

She was a member of the Actors Studio. In 1961, she moved to California. She worked in television, film, commercials, and live theatre. Gordon acted in Padua Hills Playwrights’ Festival productions, an experimental Los Angeles–based theatre group that was originally active from 1980s through 1995.

Her films include Frances (1982), Weird Science (1985), Another Day in Paradise (1998) and Chuck & Buck (2000).

She was acting in Harvey at the Laguna Playhouse six weeks before she died, aged 66. She died of esophageal cancer and the complication of pulmonary failure.

Gordon was married to Marc Wedner for 43 years.

== Filmography ==
=== Film ===
Year	Title	Role	Notes
1982	Frances	Mental Patient	
1985	Weird Science	Wyatt's Mother	
1986	Poltergeist II: The Other Side	Kane's People	
1988	The Night Before	Burly Waitress	
1991	To the Moon, Alice	Fushsia Woman	Short
1993	Reckless Kelly	Hollywood Policewoman	
1993	Bloodstone: Subspecies II	Mummy	Direct-to-video
1994	Bloodlust: Subspecies III	Mummy	Direct-to-video
1994	The Road Killers	Clerk	
1997	Star Maps	Customer	
1998	Another Day in Paradise	Waitress	
1999	My Favorite Martian	Scientist	
1999	Catfish in Black Bean Sauce	Jasmine	Voice
1999	Ladies Room	Dorothy	Short
1999	Buddy Boy	Marilyn	
1999	Starry Night	Margot	
1999	Deadtime	Baker	Short
2000	Chuck & Buck	Buck's Mom	
2000	Everything Put Together	Nurse A	
2000	Destiny Stalled	Mrs.	Short
2000	Grand Central	Lady with the Rose	Short
2000	Might as Well Be Swing	Barbara	Short
2000	Freud and Darwin Sitting in a Tree	Grandmother	Short
2001	Wrong Way to Sundance	Colleen's Mom	
2002	The Dogwalker	Betsy	
2002	Stealing Harvard	Loretta	
2003	The Technical Writer	Camille	
2003	Baadasssss!	Ethel	

=== Television ===
Year	Title	Role	Notes
1974	The Last Angry Man	Mrs. O'Brien	TV movie
1985	The Twilight Zone	Second Shopper	Episode: Shatterday; Segment "A Little Peace and Quiet"
1985	Hill Street Blues	Apartment Manager	Episode: "In the Belly of the Bus"
1987	Santa Barbara	Bertha / Bag Lady	3 episodes
1989	Tales from the Crypt	Old Crone	Episode: "Only Sin Deep"
1991	The Flash	Morgue Attendant	Episode: "Good Night, Central City"
1991	Crazy from the Heart	Winifred	TV movie
1992	The Wonder Years	Miss Harrelson	Episode: "Of Mastodons and Men"
1994	Frasier	Marvella	Episode: "Travels with Martin"
1994	My So-Called Life	Waitress	Episode: "Father Figures"
1994	ER	Regina	2 episodes
1995	Alien Nation: Body and Soul	Dr. Adrian Tivoli	TV movie
1998	Buddy Faro	Velma Fleckner	Episode: "Touched by an Amnesiac"
1999	Wasteland	Agnes	Episode: "Death Becomes Her"
1999	Zoe, Duncan, Jack and Jane	Mrs. Milch	Episode: "The Advice"
1999	Freaks and Geeks	Chain Smoking Woman	Episode: "Tricks and Treats"
1999	Time of Your Life	Adele	Episode: "The Time the Millennium Approached"
2000	The X-Files	Proprietor	Episode: "Theef"
2000	Charmed	Amanda	Episode: "How to Make a Quilt Out of Americans"
2000	The West Wing	Woman in Bar	Episode: "In the Shadow of Two Gunmen: Part I
2001	Two Guys, a Girl and a Pizza Place	Law Office Receptionist	Episode: "An Eye for a Finger"
2001	That's Life	Mrs. Alvatroni	2 episodes
2001	The King of Queens	Enid / Judi	2 episodes
2001	NYPD Blue	Whack Job	Episode: "Two Clarks in a Bar"
2002	The Nightmare Room	Madame Zora	Episode: "My Name Is Evil"
