= The 7th Hunt =

2009 film

- Directed by: Jon Cohen
- Written by: Jon Cohen
- Starring: Cassady Maddox; Imogen Bailey; Matthew Charleston; Kain O'Keeffe; Tasneem Roc
- Distributed by: Left Films (2014, worldwide); Pave TV (2025, worldwide streaming)
- Release date: 2009
- Running time: 99 minutes
- Country: Australia
- Language: English

The 7th Hunt is an independent horror film from Australia, starring swimsuit model and actress Imogen Bailey of Neighbours fame. It is widely considered to be of the Ozploitation (Australian Exploitation) genre.

== Synopsis ==
A group of five sociopaths abduct five innocent people and hold them hostage in an abandoned facility, with plans to torture and kill them for their own entertainment. Each captor has their own specific way of inflicting pain and punishment. Embarking on their seventh killing spree, the killers encounter a few formidable foes, with unexpected results. Meanwhile, the five hostages will have to try to survive the night.

== Cast ==
- Cassady Maddox as Callie Clarke
- Imogen Bailey as Ariel Clarke
- Olivia Solomons as Sarah Fairmont
- Matthew Charleston as Ricky Walker
- Kain O'Keefe as Chris Roberts
- Sarah Mawbey as Catherine (The Inquisitor)
- Tasneem Roc as Becky (The Hand)
- Jason Stojanovski as The Sniper
- Darren K. Hawkins as The Hacker
- Malcolm Frawley as The Knife
- Chris Galetti as The Mastermind
- Louis Hunter as Tom

== Production ==
The film was directed by J.D. Cohen, co-directed by Darren K Hawkins for Cinegear Productions / Coherent Productions in 2008.

== Release ==
The film first screened in 2009. It featured in the New York City Horror Film Festival, the Grimm Up North Film Festival in the UK, and the Atlanta Horror Film Festival.

It was released on DVD in February 2011.

== Critical response ==
Dread Central rated the film 1/5, calling it "yet another post-Saw abduction/torture flick on a low budget", made with a lack of skill and with one-dimensional characters. Horror Chronicles criticised the production values and noted a similarity to Hostel but suggested it might appeal to fans of torture porn. Horror News was more positive, praising it for some originality, while noting the lack of a backstory.

== See also ==
- Cinema of Australia
