= Reef Doctors =

- Genre: Drama
- Directed by: Colin Budds; Grant Brown
- Starring: Lisa McCune; Richard Brancatisano; Rohan Nichol; Susan Hoecke; Andrew Ryan; Tasneem Roc; Rod Mullinar; Justin Holborow; Chloe Bayliss; Kristof Piechocki; Matt Day
- Opening theme: "Medicine Woman", by Billie Jade Hastings
- Ending theme: "Medicine Woman"
- Composers: Ric Formosa; Ricky Edwards
- Country of origin: Australia
- Original language: English
- No. of series: 1
- No. of episodes: 13

Production
- Executive producers: Jonathan M. Shiff; Julia Adams
- Producer: Jonathan M. Shiff
- Cinematography: Zenon "Butch" Sawko
- Editor: Philip Watts
- Camera setup: Multi-camera
- Running time: 42 minutes
- Production companies: Jonathan M. Shiff Productions; ZDF Enterprises

Original release
- Network: Network Ten (episodes 1–2); Eleven (episodes 3–13)
- Release: 9 June – 7 September 2013

Reef Doctors is an Australian television drama series that premiered on Network Ten on 9 June 2013.

== Pre-production ==
Reef Doctors was the first non-children's show produced by Jonathan M Shiff. As well as starring in the series, Lisa McCune is a co-producer. Filming commenced on 28 November 2011 in Queensland, around the Great Barrier Reef, and finished in April 2012. The series was due to be broadcast from September 2012, but was pushed back to June 2013.

== Ratings and reception ==
The series received mixed reviews upon its long-overdue premiere.

The first episode finally aired on 9 June 2013 at 6:30pm, attracting low ratings of just 357,000 for Network Ten. These low figures caused Ten to move the show into a different time-slot, on Fridays at 9:30pm, but even that proved to be too much to ask, because it then failed to attract reasonable viewing figures in its changed time-slot. As a result, the show was subsequently moved to Ten's digital channel Eleven from 29 June 2013.

== Cast ==
- Lisa McCune as Dr. Sam Stewart
- Richard Brancatisano as Dr. Rick D'Alessandro
- Rohan Nichol as Toby McGrath
- Susan Hoecke as Freya Klein
- Andrew Ryan as Gus Cochrane
- Tasneem Roc as Olivia Shaw
- Rod Mullinar as Sonny Farrell
- Justin Holborow as Jack Stewart
- Chloe Bayliss as Nell Saunders
- Kristof Piechocki as Malcolm Reid
- Matt Day as Prof. Andrew Walsh
- Alexandra Davies as Gillian
- Paul Bishop as Inspector Matthew Stanton
- Sally McKenzie as Gracie
- Annabelle Stephenson as Sarah
- Michael Dorman as Scottie
- Tony Nikolakopoulos as Barry

== Episodes ==
No.	Title	Directed by	Written by	Original release date	Australian viewers (thousands)
1	"Venom Doc"	Colin Budds	Jutta Goetze	9 June 2013	357,000
2	"Episode Two"	Colin Budds	Fiona Wood	21 June 2013	193,000
3	"Episode Three"	Colin Budds	Mia Tolhurst	29 June 2013	N/A
4	"Episode Four"	Colin Budds	Sue Hore	6 July 2013	N/A
5	"Episode Five"	Colin Budds	John Ridley	13 July 2013	N/A
6	"Episode Six"	Colin Budds	Anthony Morris	20 July 2013	N/A
7	"Episode Seven"	Colin Budds	Deb Parsons	27 July 2013	N/A
8	"Episode Eight"	Grant Brown	Elizabeth Coleman	3 August 2013	N/A
9	"Episode Nine"	Grant Brown	Annie Beach	10 August 2013	N/A
10	"Episode Ten"	Grant Brown	Fiona Wood	17 August 2013	N/A
11	"Episode Eleven"	Grant Brown	Meaghan Rodriguez	24 August 2013	N/A
12	"Episode Twelve"	Grant Brown	Anthony Morris	31 August 2013	N/A
13	"Episode Thirteen"	Grant Brown	Jutta Goetze	7 September 2013	N/A

== Home media ==
Series	DVD release dates	Distributor
Series	Region 4	Distributor
1	7 November 2013 (AUS)	Universal Home Entertainment
1	20 July 2022 (AUS)	Via Vision Entertainment
