= Krista Vendy =

Australian actress

- Born: 1 January 1973 (age 53); Ballarat, Victoria
- Occupations: Actress, Model, Philanthropist.
- Years active: 1999–current
- Spouse: Brett Rogers (since 2018)
- Children: 2
- Family: Kristian Schmid (cousin)

Krista Vendy is an Australian actress who played teacher Teresa "Tess" Bell on the Australian soap opera Neighbours from 1999 to 2001 and in 2023 and 2025.

== Early life ==
Vendy was born and raised in Ballarat, Victoria, to an Austrian mother, Crystal, and Australian father, David. She was a dancer from the age of 5, and played the clarinet at school.

After finishing school, she moved to Melbourne and began a professional modelling career, going on to become a successful model in Australia, Asia and Europe. She also entered beauty pageants winning "Dream-girl of the Year" in Turkey, and placed in the Top 5 for Miss Globe and Miss Tourism International. Following this, she worked behind the scenes, choreographing pageants in India and Sri Lanka.

Upon returning to Australia, Krista joined a modelling agency where she was scouted by Scott Michaelson from Neighbours, and cast as Tess Bell in Neighbours.

== Career ==
Vendy came to fame playing schoolteacher Tess Bell on Neighbours from 1999 to 2001. After Neighbours, she guest starred in further television roles including, Blue Heelers, Shock Jock, Nightmares and Dreamscapes, Pizza and Underbelly Files: Chopper. She was also a regular guest on Good Morning Australia four years.

Krista then travelled to the US, where she appeared in television commercials, was in several plays and had guest roles in television shows Mental and Leverage.

Her film credits include Matching Jack, The Writer, Fat Pizza, Horseplay and The Incredible Hulk.

Krista also studied acting whilst in Los Angeles.

== Personal life ==
Vendy's brother, Simon, is a senior paramedic. Vendy is the cousin of Kristian Schmid, and was managed by Scott Michaelson, both of whom are past Neighbours stars.

Vendy resides in Los Angeles and Melbourne. She dated actor William Hurt from 2006 to 2010. Vendy married Australian entrepreneur Brett Rogers in 2018.

Vendy studied archaeology at UCLA.

== Filmography ==
=== Television ===
| Year | Title | Role | Type |
|---|---|---|---|
| 1999–2001; 2023–2025 | Neighbours | Tess Bell | TV series, 224 episodes |
| 2000–04 | Good Morning Australia | Regular guest | TV series, 5 episodes |
| 2001 | Pizza | Secretary | TV series, season 2, episode 5: "Melbourne Pizza" |
| 2002 | Blue Heelers | Meg Regan | TV series, season 9, episode 3: "If It Ain't Hurtin'" |
| 2002 | Shock Jock | Yoni Shaktipat | TV series, season 2, episode 3: "Heaven Must Be There" |
| 2006 | Nightmares & Dreamscapes: From the Stories of Stephen King | Front Desk Clerk | TV series, season 1, episode 1: "Battleground" |
| 2009 | Leverage | Receptionist | TV series, season 1, episode 10: "The 12-Step Job" |
| 2009 | Mental | Celeste | TV series, season 1, episode 5: "Roles of Engagement" |
| 2018 | Underbelly Files: Chopper | Fanny | TV miniseries, 1 episode |
| 2020 | AussieWood | Anna Harrison | TV series |

=== Film ===
| Year | Title | Role | Type |
|---|---|---|---|
| 2003 | Horseplay | Tiffany Byrnes | Feature film |
| 2003 | Fat Pizza | Green Peace Secretary | Feature film |
| 2005 | The Writer | The Prostitute | Short film |
| 2008 | The Incredible Hulk | Female Bar Tender | Feature film |
| 2010 | Matching Jack (aka Love and Mortar) | Angela | Feature film |
| 2015 | Run | Waitress | Short film |
| 2016 | Windows | The Machine | Short film |
| 2019 | Who Needs the Guy | Kerry | Short film |
| 2019 | Choir Girl | Polly | Feature film |
| 2022 | Victim | Tanya | Short film |
