= Chris Piechocki =

Australian actor

Kristof "Chris" Piechocki (born 14 August 1979, in Gdańsk, Poland), is an Australian actor.

== Personal ==
At the age of 9 months, Piechocki moved from communist Poland to Perth, Western Australia with his family. At the age of 19, he joined a Polish youth theatre group in Perth.

== Career ==
Piechocki attended the Western Australian Academy of Performing Arts in 2002 to study acting. He is also a graduate in commerce and holds a Master of Philosophy from the University of Sydney.

In 2007, he returned to Poland to perform the role of an Australian in a television series Tylko Milosc. He also taught English pronunciation to contestants in the Polish edition of Star Academy.

In 2011, he was cast for a minor role in a new Channel Ten TV series, Reef Doctors, filmed on the Great Barrier Reef in Queensland, and another small part in the ABC TV series Miss Fisher's Murder Mysteries, filmed in Melbourne.

== Filmography ==
- Reef Doctors TV series (2012)
- Miss Fisher's Murder Mysteries TV series (2012)
- Klub Szalonych Dziewic TV series (2010)
- Londynczycy TV series (2009)
- Tylko Milosc TV series (2007–2009)
- Egzamin z Zycia (2008)

== Other appearances ==
- Orzel czy reszta (2008)
- Staff member of Polish TV Star Academy, (Fabryka Gwiazd) (2008),
