= Mother of the Bride (2024 film) =

Film by Mark Waters

- Release poster
- Directed by: Mark Waters
- Written by: Robin Bernheim
- Produced by: Brad Krevoy
- Starring: Brooke Shields; Miranda Cosgrove; Benjamin Bratt
- Cinematography: Ed Wu
- Edited by: Travis Sittard
- Music by: Caroline Ho
- Production company: Motion Picture Corporation of America
- Distributed by: Netflix
- Release date: May 9, 2024
- Running time: 90 minutes
- Country: United States
- Language: English

Mother of the Bride is a 2024 American romantic comedy film directed by Mark Waters and written by Robin Bernheim. It stars Brooke Shields, Miranda Cosgrove, Sean Teale, Chad Michael Murray, Rachael Harris, and Benjamin Bratt.

Lana Winslow is surprised by her daughter Emma who returns from London with news of her impending Thailand wedding in a month's time and is further shocked upon learning her fiancé's father is her college sweetheart who jilted her 30 years ago.

The film was released on Netflix on May 9, 2024.

== Plot ==
After spending a year working for Discovery Resorts in London, Emma Winslow is thrilled when her boyfriend RJ surprises her with a proposal. She gladly accepts but worries about how her mother, Lana, will react, as it has just been the two of them since her father died when she was eight.

In San Francisco, Lana Winslow, who leads a medical research lab, is surprised when Emma announces she will not be going to grad school or job hunting but instead plans to start her own business. Emma explains she will receive a six-figure sponsorship for promoting Discovery and then shocks Lana further by revealing she is getting married in a month at a resort in Phuket, Thailand. Once assured Emma is certain, Lana expresses her happiness for her daughter. The wedding costs are covered by Discovery in exchange for publicity.

In Thailand, Lana is joined by her best friend Janice and their Stanford friends, Scott and Clay, who recently married. Lana soon learns RJ is the son of Will Jackson, Scott’s brother and her ex-boyfriend from Stanford.

Before dinner with Emma, RJ, and Will, Lana confides in Emma that Will ghosted her after graduation, prompting her to change her number and move away to avoid being hurt again. A geneticist, Lana worries RJ might do the same to Emma, but Emma reassures her not to worry.

At dinner, Lana and Will agree to be matron-of-honor and best man. RJ thanks Lana for her cappuccino maker present, while Will gifts them his Tribeca condo. Later, Lana shares with Janice her insecurities about competing with Will. Meanwhile, Discovery’s brand manager, Camala, excludes Lana from much of the wedding planning to prioritize certain brands and designers.

Janice arranges a date for Lana with Lucas Campion, a doctor from LA, after he helps Will when Lana accidentally hits him in the groin during a pickleball game. However, she does not stay for very long during the date. The next day, Camala shows Lana the flamboyant black designer dress she is to wear in the wedding. She reluctantly agrees to it, feeling the brand manager is taking away the joy of the wedding by imposing plans to make it into an event.

As Lana is not included in that day's wedding plan, she and the Stanford group head out to a secluded island and go skinny dipping. As it is prohibited on hotel property, they get reprimanded. Camala threatens to pull funding for the wedding, so Emma accuses Lana of intentionally undermining the wedding and tells her to leave.

Having overheard their exchange, Will takes Lana for a ride to cheer her up. The jeep they take to the remote spot fails to start for their return, so they head down to the nearest beach to flag down a boat. There, they finally talk about their past and make peace.

As Emma regrets scolding Lana, RJ suggests she apologize. Realizing Will and Lana are missing, a resort employee grabs a boat to fetch them and arrives just before they can kiss. Seeing Will and Lana looking cozy together on their return to the hotel, Lucas asks her to call if things do not work out with Will. Lana reconciles with Emma who then tells Camala that the wedding is going to run her way from now on.

At the rehearsal dinner, Lana overhears Will talking to a woman named Katrina on the phone, saying he cannot live without her. Feeling déjà vu, she retires to her room. Emma senses there is something off about her mother and goes to her room. They talk, and Emma falls asleep next to her.

The next day, although Lana becomes overwhelmed and cries, the wedding ceremony runs smoothly. When Emma throws the bouquet, Lana dodges it, but Will catches it for her. Confronting her, he demands to know why she has been ignoring him. When Lana asks Will about Katrina, he reveals that she is his personal assistant who had brought the original ring he had bought for Lana many years ago. Will proposes and, after a moment's hesitation, she happily accepts.

== Cast ==
- Brooke Shields as Lana
- Miranda Cosgrove as Emma
- Benjamin Bratt as Will
- Rachael Harris as Janice
- Sean Teale as RJ
- Chad Michael Murray as Lucas
- Michael McDonald as Clay
- Wilson Cruz as Scott
- Tasneem Roc as Camala
- Dalip Sondhi as Harley

== Production ==
In February 2023, Netflix announced a romantic comedy film written by Robin Bernheim and to be directed by Mark Waters was in pre-production. Brooke Shields, Miranda Cosgrove, Benjamin Bratt, Chad Michael Murray, Rachael Harris, Sean Teale, Wilson Cruz, Michael McDonald, Tasneem Roc, and Dalip Sondhi were added to the cast. Principal photography began in April 2023 in Phuket, Thailand.

== Release ==
Mother of the Bride was released on Netflix on May 9, 2024. By the end of June, the film amassed 77 million views.

== Reception ==
On the review aggregator website Rotten Tomatoes, 13% of 48 critics' reviews are positive, with an average rating of 3.3/10. The website's consensus reads: "Mother of the Bride serves an oft-overlooked demographic and takes us to crystalline beaches before it ceremonially drowns in generic waters." Metacritic, which uses a weighted average, assigned the film a score of 39 out of 100, based on 12 critics, indicating "generally unfavorable" reviews.

Benjamin Lee from The Guardian scored the film a two out of five, writing: "It's a slight cut above just how very bad these things can get, but not enough to edge it toward something that would deserve your full attention. So errand away, Mother of the Bride will be just fine playing in the background". Jennifer Green reviewing for Common Sense Media gave the film a score of three out of five.
