= Fireflies (Australian TV series) =

- Genre: Drama
- Created by: John O'Brien
- Starring: Kain O'Keeffe; Libby Tanner; Jeremy Sims; Natasha Novak; Nadia Townsend; Christopher Morris; Rob Steele
- Theme music composer: Paul Kelly, Stephen Rae
- Opening theme: "Beautiful Feeling"
- Composer: Paul Kelly
- Country of origin: Australia
- Original language: English
- No. of seasons: 1
- No. of episodes: 22

Production
- Running time: 60 minutes
- Production company: Southern Star

Original release
- Network: ABC
- Release: 1 February – 1 June 2004

Fireflies is an Australian television show which aired on the Australian Broadcasting Corporation (ABC) in Australia and RTÉ One in Ireland. It debuted on 7 February 2004 and screened as 22 episodes. The series was set in the fictional country town of Lost River, population 487. The location was the actual Hunter Valley town of Wollombi, and other scenes are set in the district and along the southern end of the Putty Road to Singleton. It was centred on the lives of a group of volunteer firefighters, during the hottest, driest summer in decades. The theme song "Beautiful Feeling" was written and performed by Paul Kelly.

== Songs and music ==
All the songs and music used on Fireflies was written, produced, and sung by Paul Kelly.

- Change Your Mind
- Beautiful Feeling
- Foggy Highway
- Just About to Break
- I Wasted Time
- You Broke a Beautiful Thing
- Beautiful Promise
- Boon Companion
- If I Could Start Today Again
- I Smell Trouble
- Emotional
- My Way is to You
- Your Lovin' is On My Mind
- Give Into My Love
- View From the Ridge
- Making Hay While the Sun Shines
- Beggar on the Street of Love
- Midnight Rain
- Take Your Time
- The Lion and the lamb
- Nothing Lost, Nothing Gained
- To Be Good Takes a Long time (To Be Bad No Time at All)
- Last Train to Heaven
- Everybody Wants to Touch Me
- Smoke Under the Bridge
- These are the Days
- Sure Got Me
- Taught by Experts
- Rally 'Round the Drum
- Be Careful What You Pray For
- Difficult Woman
- You're So Fine

== Cast ==
- Russell Kiefel as Sharpie
- Anna Hruby as Rebekah Sharp
- Libby Tanner as Lil Yengill
- Jeremy Sims as Tim 'Bakka' Burke
- Natasha Novak as Svettie Burke
- John Waters as Perry Luscombe
- Abe Forsythe as Hank Sharp
- Steve Rodgers as Constable Mike Jones
- Nadia Townsend as Fifi Sharp
- Christopher Morris as Joey Burke
- Edmund Cinis as Carter
- Keeara Byrnes as Candy
- Hayley McInerney as Taz Luscombe
- Rhonda Doyle as Ali
- Ashley Fitzgerald as Noodle
- Kain O'Keeffe as Kieran Sharp
- Peter Lamb as Eris
- Barbara Angell as Mena
- Bradley Byquar as Patto
- Helen O'Leary as Luisa
- Russell Newman as Jeff Burke
- Stephen Leeder as Bryce

== Guest cast ==
- Phil Bradac as Firie
- Erich Thill as Bikie
- Larry O'Carroll as Larry
- Tanya Randolf as Tanya
- Ros Bailey as Reggie
- Rob Steele as Stewart MacTavish
- Kim Knuckey as Noel McKinley
- Scott Pollard as Steve
- Janice Oxenbould as Peg
- Keith Agius as Morgan Long
- Tony Eastley as Newsreader
- Stephen Holt as Ginge
- Sandy Ireland as Suzie
- Jie Pitman as Nathan 'Rolly' Patterson
- Ling-Hsueh Tang as KC
- Shayne Francis as Donna Bruce
- Lyn Lee as Val
- Johann Walraven as Ziggy
- Rob Carlton as Kewie Holman
- Kaitlyn Cox as Hotel Receptionist
- Kevin Donohue as Fly
- Stan Kouros as Maurice Badroek
- Toby Levins as Roy
- Anne-marie Mazza as Juno Hardcliffe
- Ian McColm as Laggan Firie
- Jimmy Pike as Johnny Blunt
- Cameron Wade as himself
- Rowan Webb as Firie #1
- John Whitman as Musician #1
- Mark Duffy as Fire Investigator
- Justin Rosniak as Steve (2 episodes)
- Jon Sivewright as Strike Team Firie (1 episode)

== List of episodes ==
Ep.	Title	Original Air Date	Episode Summary	
1	Fireflies: Part 1	7 February 2004	-	
2	Fireflies: Part 2	7 February 2004	-	
3	Sifting Through The Ashes	14 February 2004	Lost River is in recovery from a devastating fire that nearly took the lives of some of their best firefighters and local farmers. Perry struggles to come to terms with the loss of his home, while Lill and his daughter Taz rival for his attention. Meanwhile, tension mounts between Joey and Fifi over Fifi's actions concerning their baby. Luisa learns that her secret love affair with the local cop Mike, is no longer a secret. It all comes to a head when Rebekah Sharp turns up and announces that Luisa's husband Eris was inside a fire truck engulfed by flames. Suddenly Luisa realises that a lot more people know about her affair than she thought. She rushes to be with Eris who is feeling lost and alone. Backa is trying to deliver on his promise to be "there" for his wife Svettie, but his fire crew has been traumatised and there's counselling to be done.	
4	Hide And Seek	21 February 2004	-	
5	Best Laid Plans	28 February 2004	-	
6	Training Daze	6 March 2004	-	
7	Hazard Reduction	13 March 2004	Fifi has to deal with her unpredictable brother Hank who has just returned from prison and has a different story to tell to everyone he meets. Back at home the Sharp family try to welcome this free radical element as Hank tries to wheedle his way back into Fifi's life. Lill and Perry are trying hard to deal with Taz, Perry's moody teenage daughter who's arrived for the holidays. She clashes with Lill over everything and confronts her father with her palpable distaste for her stepmother. Lill prepares for the fire controlled Hazard Reduction but is unprepared for the discovery she makes when she and Svettie clean out Peg's house. Elsewhere, Backa struggles with the responsibilities of a dangerous burn-off and the knowledge that his deal with his Uncle Jeff may well betray his brother.	
8	Ride With Style	20 March 2004	-	
9	Home Is Where The Heat Is	27 March 2004	In a last bid attempt to save her failing shop and keep her family together Svettie has borrowed a large amount of cash from a loan shark. But she's keeping it a secret from Backa, telling him the sudden injection of funds has come from the sale of some milking machinery stored in their back shed. Now they're on easy street, for a while at least. In a mood to celebrate Backa and Svettie have the best day they've had in months, even years! The day soon heats up toward boiling point. At the Sharp's a lazy summer barbecue descends into chaos. Eldest son Hank has returned to Lost River and he's ready to cause as much trouble as possible - especially for Fifi. Hank can't forgive the fact that his younger sister is now all grown up and responsible and pushes to find the bad girl he farewelled when he went to jail three years ago. When Rolly Patterson arrives mid-party and makes a beeline for Fifi it seems Hank might get to see the old Fifi after all. There are others for Hank to 'play' with too, in the shape of Kieran and his girlfriend Noodle and when Perry's daughter Taz turns up, it's open season... Perry and Lill arrive at the scene to pick up a distraught Taz and it leaves Perry with a sinking feeling. Is he ready to become a parent the second time around? For Lill, one of the core promises of their relationship has been broken.	
10	The Longest Day	1 April 2004	-	
11	While The Cat's Away	8 April 2004	-	
12	Home Time	15 April 2004	-	
13	Clouds Got In The Way	22 April 2004	Lill's newly published children's book arrives and she prepares to test it out on the kids of Lost River. Surrounded by children at play and talking through issues of motherhood with her female friends, Lill is forced to confront her desire for a child. But it's Perry who brings the matter out into the open when he asks Lill an important question about their relationship. Sharpie and Rebekah decide to get Joey and Fifi a new bed now that Joey has moved in with the Sharps. Sharpie does a deal with an old mate and scams a free bed for them. The 'honeymoon' period is short and sweet for Fifi and Joey but with a little peppermint oil, some vinegar and a new set of sheets, they sort themselves out and clear the air. The Twelfth Green Developments group holds a public meeting to address community concerns about the golf course and resort intended for Lost River. Backa and Svettie want to work with the developers, claiming the project will bring economic benefit to the town. Perry, Lill and especially Eris have a different take on the matter though, questioning the motives and plans of the consortium. Backa and Eris begin a public argument over the future of their town and community. But the two men have a reality check when they are called out to investigate a gas smell. What they discover puts everything into perspective.	
14	Keep Your Enemies Close	29 April 2004	-	
15	Fish Or Cut Bait	6 May 2004	-	
16	Between A Rock And A Rock	13 May 2004	-	
17	Kin Oath	20 May 2004	Peg Beecher is back and after escaping from her nursing home, she makes a beeline for her house only to find it's been rented out to the new doctor and his family. When Peg lands on Lill's doorstep, Lill decides to champion her cause, but she doesn't know what she's let herself in for. Peg's not happy, so it's tantrums all round first at Lill and Perry's, then at Backa and Svettie's. Backa is agonising over whether to sell the homestead paddock that his father's ashes are on while Svettie sympathises with his dilemma she knows they need the money and pushes him accordingly. Backa visits Joey to ask his advice, but Joey is furious that Backa would even contemplate doing such a thing. Meanwhile, Lill and Perry are still trying to patch up their relationship as best they can. Fifi comes home to find Hank acting even more suspiciously than usual, and when he hands her over some cash she knows something is going on. At dinner the next night, the Sharps hear of a bookie robbery over the radio. While everyone suspects Hank, nothing is said. Hank is full of bravado and when he destroys a piece of Joey's property, Fifi is pushed over the edge. She will be forced to choose between her new life with Joey and her family.	
18	Sons And Lovers	27 May 2004	-	
19	Closing In	3 June 2004	Perry's moved into the mud brick house and Lill is happy about that-or is she? During a drunken phone call with Perry's ex-wife, Lill realises her relationship may really be over. Then the unravelling starts as her happiness turns and reality starts closing in. Can she live without Perry? It's another hot day and a fire has started in the Tuza State forest. Fifi learns that Fire Control Officer Bryce Austin will do everything he can to save Fox Cove, including putting his own house at risk. Meanwhile, Mike is closing in on Svettie and Sharpie's dope crop. He's torn between being the cop and living in a small country town where he has become familiar with the residents. It's a fine line and Mike is still an outsider. But a secret is out about Mike and his world is about to close in on him too.	
20	Fighting Fire With Fire	17 June 2004	Lost River's very existence is threatened by the fires. Backa believes that it is less than 24 hours before the fires reach the village. The Lost River brigade also insist on sniping in front of Divisional Commander Donna Bruce. Svettie makes an unexpected visit to the station and learns that the fire may reach Deep Creek by nightfall and alerts Sharpie, who enlists the help of his son Hank, to help harvest their Deep Creek plantation before the fire arrives. Meanwhile, Lill asks Perry for a truce until the fire has passed, but Perry refuses. Backa convinces Donna that the only way he can unite his brigade is to get them out to the fire ground. However, when they confront the raging fire, the flames have spread too far and Backa is forced to fall back to Deep Creek to backburn. Svettie, cut off from all communication, is in the middle of the area he intends to burn. Kieran, knowing where his father, brother and Svettie are, convinces Lill that they must warn them before they get trapped. When Lill becomes a hero on the fire ground, she realises maybe she'll be able to survive on her own after all.	
21	Precious Things	24 June 2004	The fire front is racing into Lost River, it's much bigger than they thought and the water pressure has failed. The trucks are going to have to relay back and forth to the dam at Sharpie's to refill, and when they discover that Suzie's place is burning inside the roof, Backa has to make a difficult call. Meanwhile, Lill's left Perry with a box and a question. Joey's thrown into the thick of things at the Sharps, with Hank being his usual infuriating self and Sharpie way too relaxed to be much good. Svettie knows exactly what to save-but what should she do first when she can't leave the shop? It's going to be a long day at Lost River.	
22	When The Smoke Clears	24 June 2004	In the final hour of Fireflies, days have passed since the fires. Everyone is trying to return to normal and clean up the damage, but it's not going to be easy. Lill tries her hand at spinning. She has a few CWA ladies over for a spinning session-nothing more meditative or calming, until Perry arrives and shocks her with the news that he's changed his mind. After many arguments and tension, he has finally decided that he does want to have a baby with her. Now she really has something to meditate on while she spins her wool! Fifi and Joey are begrudgingly living with Uncle Jeff, but they're hoping it's only temporary. It's got to be temporary. Just has to be. But Joey knows that with the fires gone and their caravan burnt out, Fifi's going to have to reconcile with her family. It's eating her up inside, and Uncle Jeff's icy deal making isn't helping. Sharpie's just getting by. His house was saved, but now he's got a son on the critical list in hospital, another son who wants to marry his 15-year-old girlfriend and a wife and daughter estranged from each other. Sharpie starts wondering where he went wrong. As for Backa, he just wants to give up the captaincy as he always promised Svettie and get on with his life. The only hitch is that no new captain is coming forward. He then discovers four cases of illegal cash crop in the back shed and at last the truth comes out, layer on layer of it-Svettie's debts, Svettie's lies, their real financial situation, the fish-farming investments. It'd be funny if it weren't so shocking. And Constable Mike Jones is sniffing around, dropping hints. Backa's convinced Mike knows about the drugs. But it's a funny old world, as Lill realises she's torn between the man she loves who's promising her everything she ever wanted-and a married man who isn't promising her anything. Maybe the secret is to see things clearly and stop fooling herself. Maybe the secret is to open her eyes and wait for the smoke to clear.	-

== Home media ==
It was announced by Via Vision Entertainment in April 2019 that they would be releasing the complete season of Fireflies on DVD.

Title	Format	Ep #	Discs	Region 4 (Australia)	Special features	Distributors
FireFlies (Complete Season)	DVD	22	7	5 June 2019	None	Via Vision Entertainment

== See also ==
- List of Australian television series
