= The Technical Writer =

- Directed by: Scott Saunders
- Written by: Michael Harris; Scott Saunders
- Produced by: Jim Calabrese; Michael Harris; Susan Leber; David W. Leitner; Scott Saunders
- Starring: Michael Harris; Tatum O'Neal; William Forsythe
- Cinematography: David W. Leitner
- Edited by: David Leonard
- Music by: Stephen Cullo
- Release date: 2003
- Running time: 96 minutes
- Country: United States
- Language: English

The Technical Writer is a 2003 drama film directed by Scott Saunders, who co-wrote screenplay with lead actor Michael Harris. It also stars Tatum O'Neal and William Forsythe.

== Plot ==
A shut-in is seduced by the new neighbour from downstairs.

== Cast ==
- Michael Harris - Jessup
- Tatum O'Neal - Slim
- William Forsythe - Joe
- Pamela Gordon - Camille
- Oksana Babiy - Nasty (as Oksana Babiy)
- Natalia Novikova - Risa
- John Lanzillotto - Johnny the doorman

== Reception ==
The film received mixed to poor reviews. Liz Braun, writing in the Toronto Sun, gives it 3 1/2 out of 5 and states "The Technical Writer is a film that works because of the writing. Jessup's transformation -- via passion -- is not a Hollywood geek-to-hunk fantasy but a rather endearing study of a regular guy's surprise to discover his own capacity for joy." Film Threat's Merle Bertrand concluded "This is still a decent film, however. Like an instruction booklet that's actually well written and interesting, “The Technical Writer” is, for the most part, a pleasant and unexpected surprise." Variety's Dennis Harvey begins "A tepid drama that starts out looking like a routine erotic-thriller but ends up as something even less interesting". Geoff Pevere of the Toronto Star gave it 2/5 saying "While the set-up is pure neo-noir -- vamp wife, slimeball husband, sucker hero -- The Technical Writer takes its eye off the light at the end of the tunnel." Writing in the Globe and Mail Stephen Cole gave it one star, saying "What a load! The Technical Writer is a numbingly bad movie and a glorious inspiration to every wannabe filmmaker with a "deeply personal" script wasting away in the bottom drawer of his or her desk."
