= List of Kath & Kim characters =

The following page is a list of characters in the Australian comedy television series Kath & Kim.

== Characters ==
=== Main characters ===
==== Kath Day-Knight ====
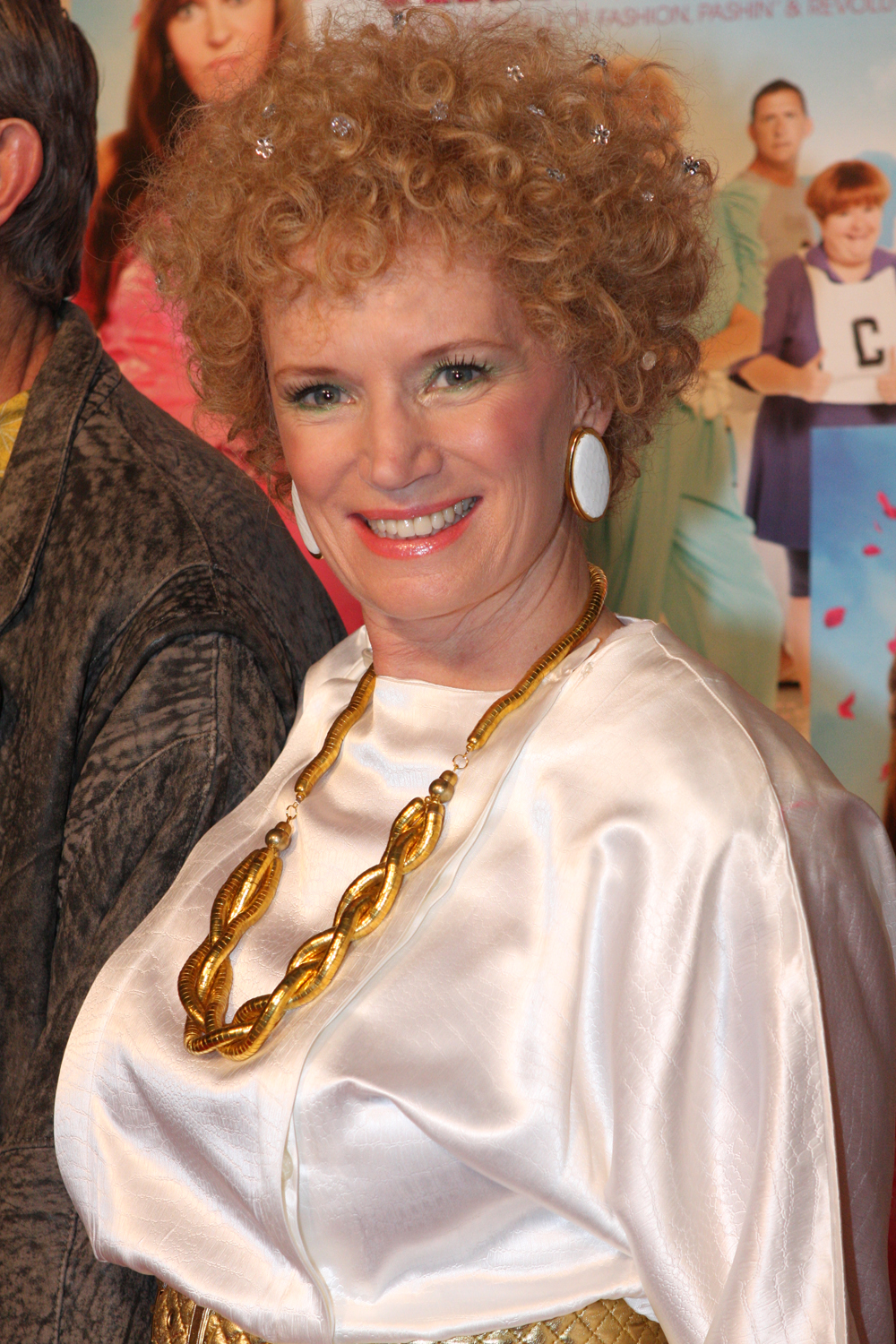
Kath Day-Knight

Kath Day-Knight is a cheery middle-aged woman, the mother of Kim and the wife (after Season 1) of Kel.

Kath was born in 1954, and was married to Gary Poole (Kim's father) for a short time in the late seventies. It is revealed in 2x08 that Garry left just after Kim was born. Kath got the house when Gary left, which she sold, leaving her reasonably well off. She lives in Fountain Lakes with Kel (after Season 1) and frequently with Kim (who keeps breaking up with Brett). In Season 4, Kim, Brett and Epponee all move in with them. Kath doesn't have a permanent job, but has done a large number of TAFE courses. In the 2005 telemovie, Kath and Kel got offered a franchise called The Da Vinci Code Tours, but that is never mentioned in the next season.

While sorting through old family pictures, Kath realizes that she is of Aboriginal Descent after taking a DNA test which proved it in the episode "Roots". She is also of Manx and Chinese descent. Kath also experiences problems with her age; feeling too old at times as she is four months older than her husband, Kel. Kath is a supporter of the Richmond Tigers.

==== Kim Craig nee Day ====
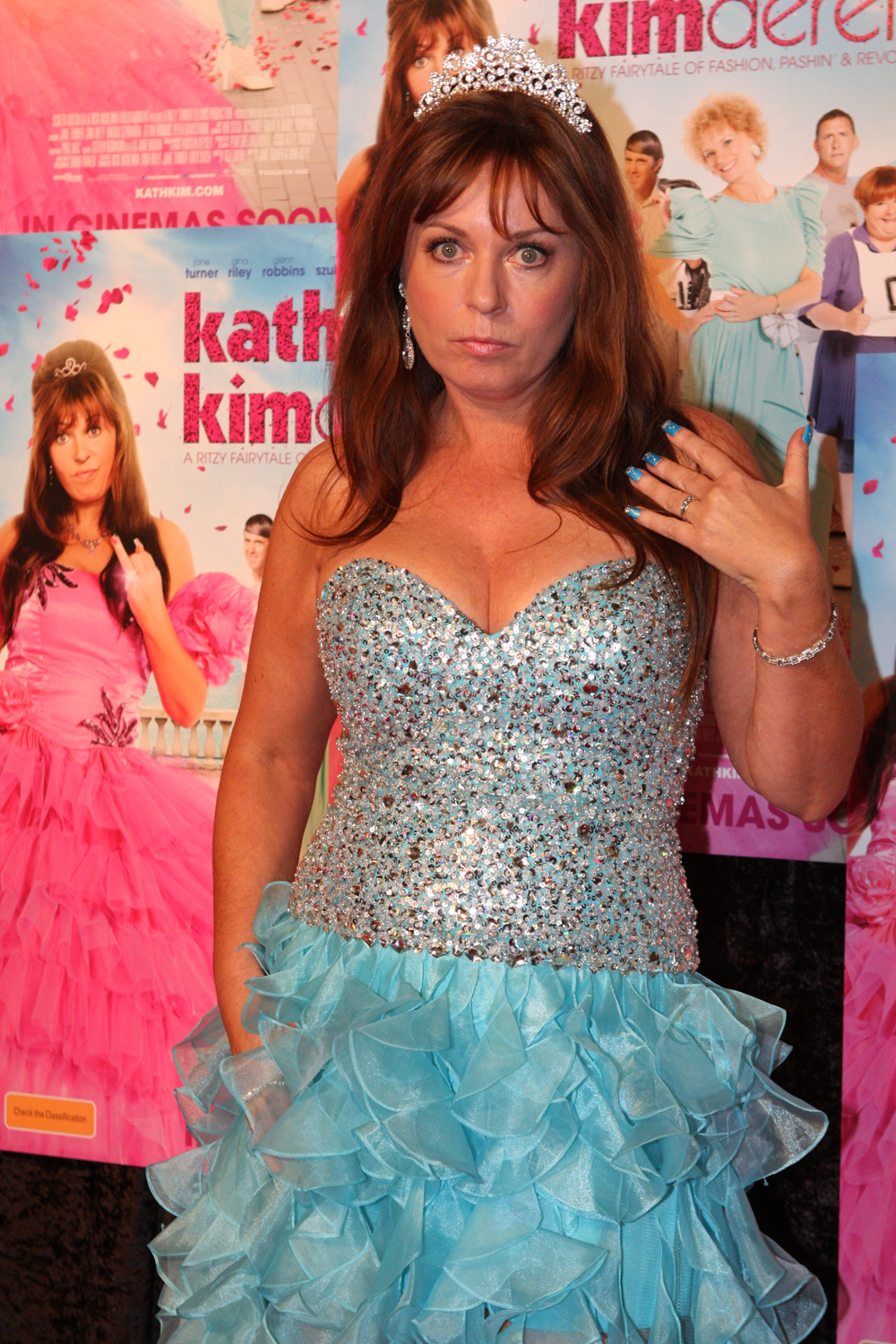
Kim Craig

Kim Craig is a lazy, self-absorbed, ever-complaining, screaming, spoilt and accident-prone woman. She is the daughter of Kath and the wife of Brett. She is often seen lying down, shopping, going out or snacking. In Season 1 she works in a call centre, but she loses that job. In Season 2 she is pregnant, and from Season 3 onwards she is mostly a stay-at-home mum.

Kim often wears short T-shirts which allow her belly to show. Her fashion choices change frequently, at some points she wears comfortable clothing (e.g. baggy pants and a sweatshirt) and the rest of the time obsesses over herself in the mirror and talks about the latest fashion trends, which don't usually flatter her. Kim has long brown hair, a fringe and always wears make-up. Kim smokes and can be seen in the pantry of their Fountain Lakes Home, scouring it for food (usually which Sharon ends up taking and Kim reacts). Kath calls Kim a "Stupid Girl".

Kim is also seen reading Australian magazines such as New Idea and Famous.

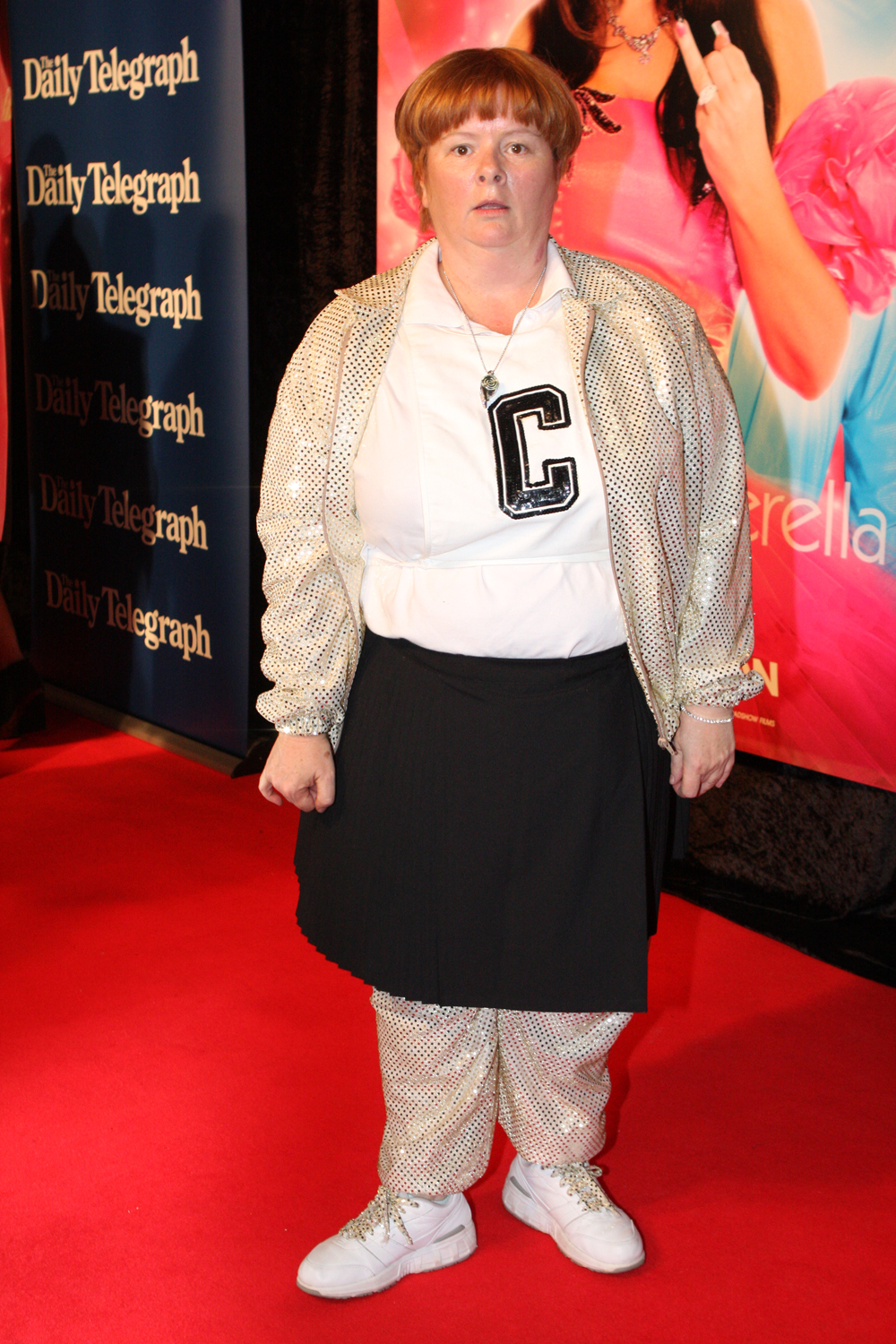
Sharon Strzelecki

==== Sharon Karen Strzelecki ====
Sharon Strzelecki is Kim's "second best friend". Her main interest is sport, and sports uniforms (summer and winter) make up the entirety of her wardrobe. She is particularly active in netball, where she is team captain of the Sapphires (and also the Unicorns), and indoor cricket. However, she is known to have golfed and to have participated in shot put at the national level. She often makes reference to it in the series, and says her mother (if she met her) would be "pleased" with her that she has found success in the Sporting Arena. Sharon also watches football, cricket and Rugby. She enjoys eating in addition, usually will barge into the Day residence and open up a box of snacks; which Kim walks in and scolds Sharon for stealing her snacks, they fight and swear at each other. Sharon also takes an interest in Kim's (and occasionally Kath's) life, and often unquestioningly aids Kim in her bizarre and frivolous endeavours. Sharon has played Indoor Cricket in 4 different states. She is a huge fan of Shane Warne.

She frequently has injuries or visible conditions such as hives.

Sharon has a terrible love life, and is described by viewers and characters in the show as "unlucky in love", mainly by Kath who feels great compassion for Sharon. It is revealed in the Season 2 finale that Sharon dated Brett before Kim did. Sharon has come close to having relationships numerous times, each unsuccessful. In Da Kath & Kim Code she Sharon finds love; however at the end of the tele-movie she reveals that her unseen fiancée "Marriat" was in fact just spam on a computer website when he was tragically killed in a plane crash at the end of the telemovie. In season 4 she has a fling with Brett. It was revealed that Sharon uses chocolate (Cadbury Favourites) to fill the need for love (as seen in the episode "Lust"). In the finale to season 4 she finally marries, to a Shane Warne impersonator named Wayne. However, in the movie she is single again, and at the end of the movie it is strongly suggested that she discovers she is gay.

==== Kel Knight ====
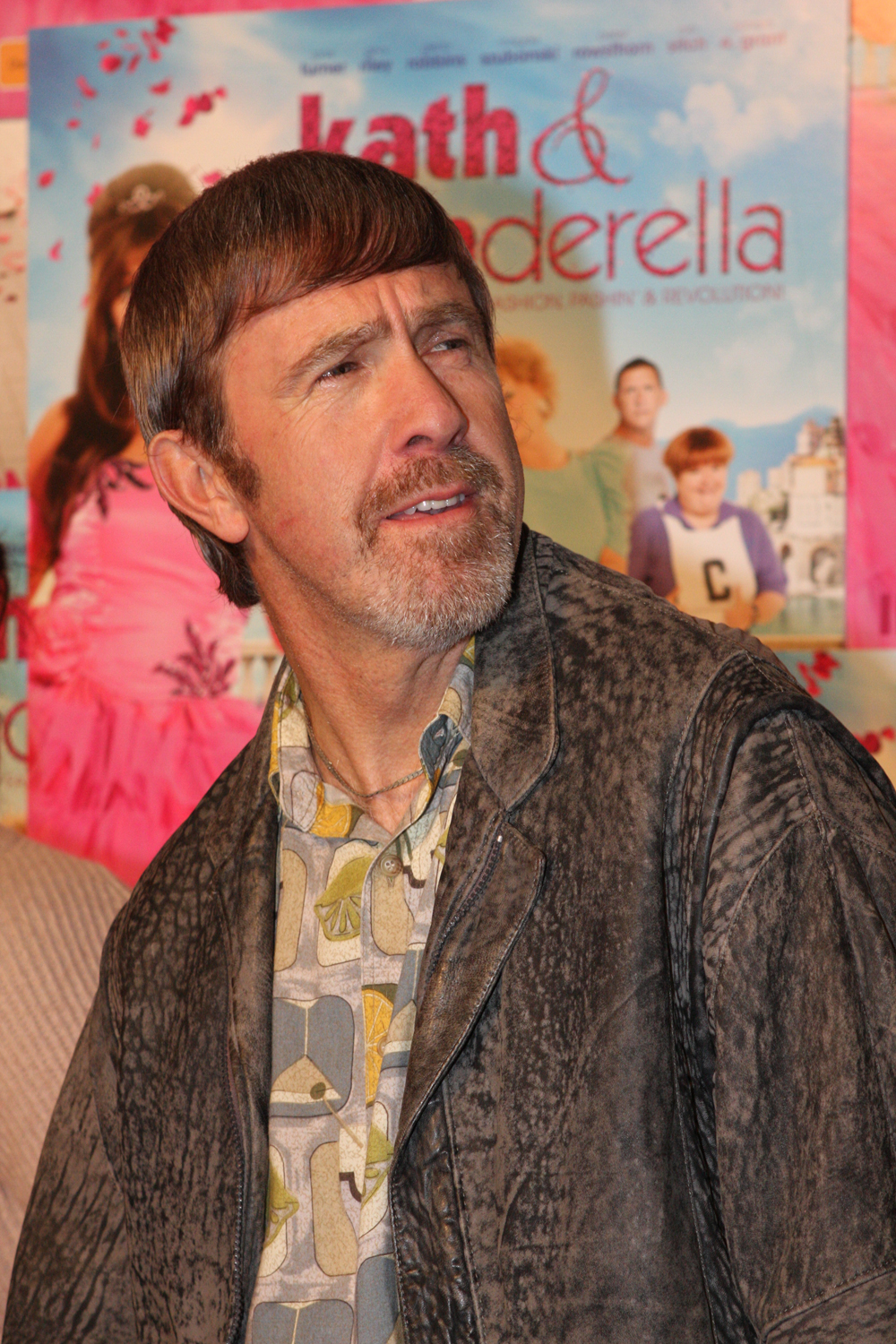
Kel Knight

Kel Knight is Kath's husband after Season 1. He is a butcher (calling himself a "purveyor of fine meats") and is what Kath considers a "great Hunk O' Spunk". He is very much in love with Kath. He gets on well with Brett, but Kim doesn't particularly like him and he often says the wrong things to her.

Kel is four months younger than Kath. He was very nervous on the day of their marriage. Kel had previously had four past fiancées leave him, and it was later revealed that they all left him for his friend Sandy Freckle.

Together with Kath, Kel loves to exercise and do aerobics and power walking. He is a "metrosexual" and likes man bags. Kel served in the navy throughout his youth.

Kel's four former fiancés whom left him at the altar during his lifespan were Yoko, Debbie, Jan and Shelia, and they fell in love with Sandy Freckle.

==== Brett Craig ====
Brett Craig is Kim's husband. Brett works at Computa City and is married to Kim Craig (Gina Riley) from the start of the series till the end. He lives with her and later, their daughter, Epponee Rae in their unit; however most of the time Kim is living with Kath Day-Knight (Jane Turner) & Kel Knight (Glenn Robbins), as they are always having marital problems. Brett's marriage to Kim contains no actual bond between the two; thus causing Brett to cheat on her on multiple occasions (even with Kelly or Sharon).

At Kel & Kath's wedding, Brett is Kel's best man. Brett has a good relationship with Kim's mother Kath, and her husband Kel. To save their marriage, by the second season, Brett and Kim announce they are trying for a baby. Kim gives birth to Epponee Rae Charlene Kathleen Darlene Craig in the Season 2 finale.

Brett has a good friendship with Kim's second best friend, Sharon Strezlecki. Initially Brett was first dating Sharon before he and Kim met. Sharon has been trying to get Brett back ever since. In the fourth series, Brett sleeps with Sharon. Kim walks in and sees them. Even though Kim is married to Brett, Brett still loves Sharon. He reveals this at the very end of the fourth series. In one episode, Kath Day-Knight, Brett's mother-in-law, has a dream into the future. She dreams that Kim and Brett have divorced, and that he is married to Sharon. Sharon and Brett have triplets. Brett sometimes refers to Sharon as 'Shazz'.

Brett loves cricket and Australian rules football and would rather sit at home watching it than helping Kim pick out an outfit for his daughters first day on the TV show Neighbours.

In Da Kath & Kim Code, Brett is attracted to his boss, Kelly. He cheats on Kim; but she takes him back (as always is the case). However, despite the reunion, Brett continued the affair. Brett strives for greatness while working for Computa City (Harvey Norman) during the course of the series, however by the end he is ultimately fired and currently works at Krispy Kreme Doughnuts.

In season 4 he was having an affair with Sharon. It was revealed that Sharon uses chocolate (Cadbury Favourites) to fill the need for love (as seen in the episode "Lust"). In the finale to season 4, Kim and Brett bought an apartment but was cancelled due to Kim's DVD overdue fines, but wanted a divorce.

=== Recurring characters ===
These characters have all starred in at least two episodes of Kath & Kim.

Character	Actor	Episodes
Epponee-Rae	various	2x08, 3, telemovie, 4, movie
Epponee-Rae	Epponnee-Rae (full name Epponnee-Raelene Kathleen Darlene Charlene Craig) is the daughter of Brett and Kim. Her name is frequently shortened to 'Eps', 'Baby Eps' or Epponnee. She is born in the Season 2 finale, and is a baby throughout Season 3, the telemovie and Season 4. In the movie she is a young girl (played by Morghyne de Vries). In 3x08 Kath has a dream of an adult Epponnee (played by Kylie Minogue) on her and Romeo's wedding day.	
Trude	Gina Riley	1x08, 2x02, 3x02, 3x07, 3x08, telemovie, 4x02, 4x04, 4x08, movie
Trude	A snobby, wealthy shop assistant and satirical parody of typical upper-class Australian women who works at homewares store "House" at Fountain Gate. She works alongside best friend Prue and both speak in a highly exaggerated upper-class Australian accent sometimes mispronouncing words completely (one of their favourites being the word 'great' which they pronounce as 'graysh'). Trude enjoys making fun of and looking down upon Kath, Kim and even Kel's common and simple ways and inferior wealth, often resulting in Prue exclaiming "Oh you're dreadful!" She is married to Graham, 'Melbourne's top plastic surgeon' and Trude will often complain about their marital woes.	
Prue	Jane Turner	1x08, 2x02, 3x02, 3x07, 3x08, telemovie, 4x02, 4x04, 4x08, movie
Prue	A snobby, wealthy shop assistant who works at homewares store "House". She works alongside best friend Trude and is considerably less nasty towards Kath and Kim. She is fond of expensive European homeware brands such as Le Creuset, Bodum and Orrefors much to the confusion of Kim when looking for wedding gifts for Kath. Prue's wealth comes from being married to a high profile, shady, stockbroker named Adrian who at one point is almost faced with jail time but does a deal with the police and blames everyone else instead, including Trude's husband Graham.	
Marion	Marg Downey	1x04, 1x08, 2x01, 3x01, 3x07, 3x08, movie
Marion	An inept marriage/love counsellor with somewhat unusual methods which tend to take her clients by surprise. She was responsible for the marriage and counselling of Kath and Kel, but was imprisoned.	
Gary Poole	Mick Molloy	2x08, 3x01, movie
Gary Poole	Gary is Kath's ex-husband and biological father of Kim, but left just after Kim was born, saying he was going out for cigarettes. When Kim was only one day old, he ran off with Wendy Patterson into a tax haven and spent twenty years in exile in Hong Kong before unexpectedly coming back to Melbourne after the birth of Epponnee Rae and learning that he and Kath were still legally married, thus causing Kath and Kel's marriage to be annulled. He departed the country after shoplifting the re-mortgaging of Kim and Brett's unit with $200,000 smackers and his divorce from Kath was now official.	
Sandy Freckle	Rock Hampton (aka William McInnes)	2x07 and 2x08
Sandy Freckle	Sandy, a beach-bum, is one of Kel's best mates and worst enemies due to the fact he steals all of Kel's girlfriends.	
Mark	Tony Martin	1x02, 1x08, 2x04 and 2x05
Mark	Sharon's on-again/off-again boyfriend who works at Molly Blooms, a nightclub. He also plays the fiddle, notably at Kath and Kel's wedding.	
Kelly	Peta Brady	1x06, 2x04, 3x01, 3x02 and the telemovie
Kelly	Brett's demanding boss at Computa City with whom he ended up having an affair.	
Darryl Lee	Mark Trevorrow	1x06, 2x08, telemovie, 4x02, movie.
Darryl Lee	Is a tailor who works at a formal hire store in Fountain Gate who helps Kel out with his suit purchases. Trevorrow also plays a lookalike of Darryl in the movie.	
Karen	Matt Lucas	4x07 and 4x08
Karen	A plus sized model who was travelling for work in Australia. She is Sharon's long lost half-sister from the United Kingdom. She also appears in the series finale in a recorded message to Sharon before her wedding and informs her that she and her mother won't be attending her wedding, and that her mother hates her.	

=== One-off characters ===
As family members:

- Magda Szubanski played Brett's mother Lorraine in 3x03.
- Kylie Minogue guest-starred as Epponnee Rae, in the future, on her wedding day, in 3x08. She also had a brief, uncredited role at the end of 3x07 as herself.
- Shane Warne guest-starred as Wayne, a Shane Warne impersonator who marries Sharon in 4x08.

As themselves:

- Rachel Griffiths guest-starred as herself, at the races with a very drunk Kath, in 3x02.
- Mark Holden guest-starred as himself, when Kim enters her baby daughter Epponee Rae into a baby competition called Bub's Idol (as Holden was a judge on Australian Idol), in 3x02.
- Michael Bublé guest-starred as himself, when Kath and Kel became back-up dancers at his performance which Kath was having an affair with, and was later bashed by Kel, in the telemovie.
- The Wiggles, Rove McManus and Rhonda Burchmore guest-starred as themselves in the telemovie.
- Eric Bana guest-starred as himself in 4x02 while attending a coffee cart opening party at Bonbeach railway station.
- Maggie Beer, Shannon Bennett, Bill Granger, Donna Hay, and Kylie Kwong all guest-starred as themselves in 4x03 as customers of Kel's butcher shop.
- Andrew O'Keefe guest-starred as himself as the host of Deal or No Deal in 4x05.

Others:

- Glenn Butcher Has played various characters throughout every series and the movies. Series one: a bartender during Kath's hens night. Series two:Judge for the volunteers of the Melbourne Commonwealth Games. Series Three: A waiter at a local restaurant at which Kath had been stoodup. Da Kath & Kim code as a car rental sales man who rents out a car to John Monk. A gay man in the movie.
- Sibylla Budd guest-starred as Lisa-Marie, Sharon's (temporary) new best friend, in episode 2x03.
- Vince Colosimo guest-starred as Jared, Brett's colleague, in 2x04.
- Kate Atkinson guest-starred as a shop assistant helping Kim in 2x04. In 3x02 she guest-starred as the mother of a child at Bub's Idol, getting in a physical altercation with Kim.
- Judith Lucy guest-starred as Bettina, a birthing-class teacher, in 2x06. She returned in the telemovie to play Santa's Elf
- Frank Woodley guest-starred in 2x07 as a Wrestling fan, and as a deaf translator in the movie.
- Geoffrey Rush and his wife Jane Menelaus guest-starred in 3x03 as neighbours Geoff and Jane who which Kath and Kel attended the Boz Scaggs concert. Menelaus also played the wedding shop assistant in 1x05.
- Gerry Connolly guest-starred as Meryl Streep, musical director at the Fountain Lakes Players, in 3x04.
- Alan Brough played Alan, Sharon's love interest and fellow hospital volunteer in 3x05.
- John Clarke guest-starred in 3x06 as a real estate agent.
- Colin Lane guest-starred in 3x06 as a spa salesman.
- Barry Humphries guest-starred as John Monk, an albino The Da Vinci Code European tour guide in the telemovie. He also made a brief appearance as Dame Edna in the movie.
- Rob Sitch guest-starred as the host of the Fountain Gate Retailer of the Year Awards in 4x02. He also played King Javier in the movie.
- Katie Hastings appeared in 4x03 as Kel's apprentice butcher.
