= Allanah Zitserman =

Australian scriptwriter and film producer

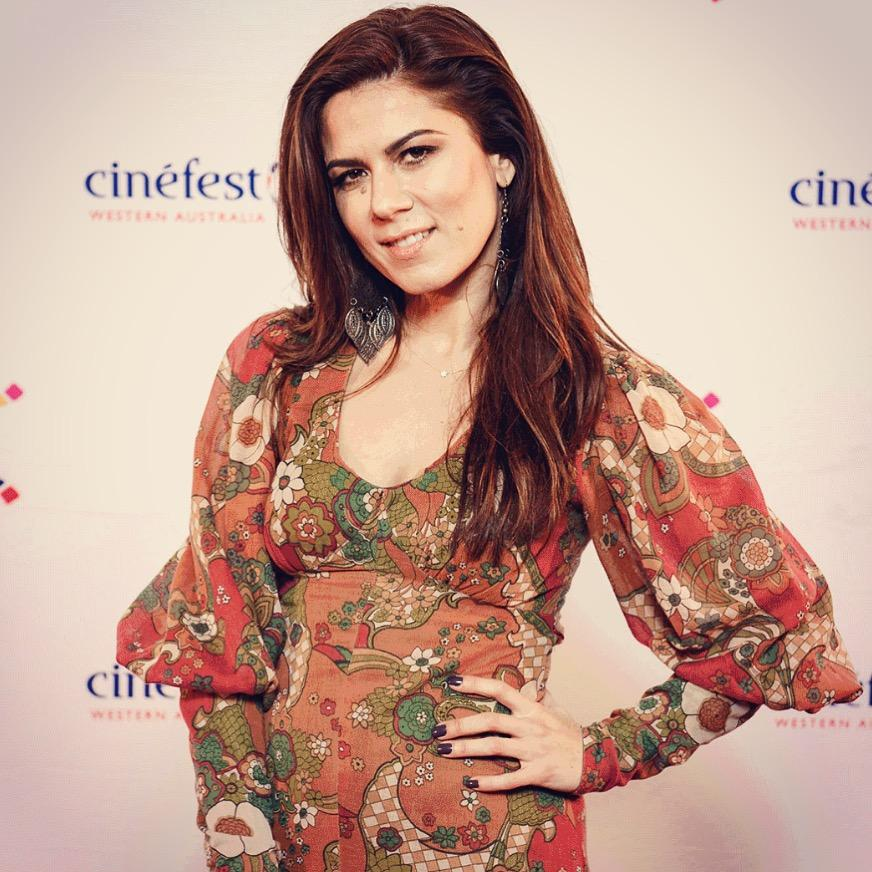
Allanah Zitserman on the red carpet at CinefestOz 2018

Allanah Zitserman is an Australian scriptwriter and film producer, founder of Dungog Film Festival, and director of Lumila Films.

== Education ==
Zitserman graduated from University of Technology, Sydney (UTS) in 1998 with a Bachelor of Business and Communications.

== Career ==
In the late 1990s, when she was 19, Zitserman started the popular nightspot, Barbarella at Soho Bar.

After graduating, Zitserman, took a production job on Strange Planet (1999), starring Naomi Watts and Claudia Karvan. Shortly after, she set up a film development and production company. A year later, she produced and penned her debut feature film Russian Doll (film) starring Hugo Weaving. Russian Doll earned Zitserman an AACTA Award for Best Original Screenplay. In 2003, she followed this up by cowriting and producing the black comedy Horseplay starring Abbie Cornish.

Zitserman then worked in script development for a few years in London. While overseas, she curated several private functions at international festivals including the Marrakech and Cannes Film Festivals.

In 2005, Zitserman returned to Australia, committing her time to both script development and spearheading Dungog Film Festival, winner of the 2012 IF Awards Best Film Festival.

In 2006, Zitserman was awarded the Australian Film Commission's Writer's Fellowship.

From 2008 until 2012, Zitserman created the script development program "In The Raw", which saw many of its projects produced including Last Cab to Darwin, Sleeping Beauty, Strangerland (starring Nicole Kidman) and Little Death. As an extension of her festival work, in 2009, Zitserman founded a film distribution company that championed local independent films. The company released many quality Australian films that would otherwise not have had a theatrical run, including the hard-hitting hit cult film, The Combination (film).

In 2017, Zitserman started production on the feature film Ladies in Black, directed by Bruce Beresford. Beresford and his friend writer/producer Sue Milliken had been in development on the film since 1994. Zitserman joined the team in 2016. Beresford, in an article in The Australian, emphasises Zitserman's importance in her involvement as a producer on the film, particularly her role in securing funding from Sony Pictures and Screen Australia. The film was released worldwide through Sony Pictures, starting in Australia on 20 September 2018. Ladies in Black (film) was the highest grossing Australian film in 2018, amassing a lifetime international gross profit of over $17 million dollars. It was the most nominated film at the 2018 AACTA Awards, with 11 nominations, and has been critically acclaimed as a "love letter to Sydney".

== Filmography ==
=== Feature films ===
Year	Title	Writer	Producer	Director
2001	Russian Doll	Yes	Yes	No
2003	Horseplay	Yes	Yes	No
2018	Ladies in Black	No	Yes	No
2022	Untitled (in development)	Yes	Yes	Yes
