= Natalia Novikova =

Australian actress

- Born: ~1971
- Occupation: Actress

Natalia Novikova is Russian-born Australian actress also known as Natasha Novak. For her performance in SeaChange, she was nominated for the 2000 Australian Film Institute Award for Best Guest or Supporting Actress in Television Drama. Other roles include Russian Doll, The Handler, Fireflies and The Technical Writer.

== Filmography ==
=== Television appearances ===
Year	Title	Role	Notes
2021	The Newsreader	Astrid	1 episode
2018	Wentworth (TV series)	Zara Dragovich	9 episodes
2018	Jack Irish	Jaeger	6 episodes
2015	House Husbands	Mia	1 episode
2011	Rush	Katya	2 episodes
2011	Killing Time (TV series)	Dina	1 episode
2004	Fireflies (TV series)	Svettie Burke	22 episodes
2004	Fireflies	Svettie Burke	TV Movie
2003	The Handler	Elena	3 episodes
2000	SeaChange	Francesca	1 episode
1998	Cody: The Wrong Stuff	Petra	TV Movie
1997	Fallen Angels	Nadia	1 episode

=== Film appearances ===
Year	Title	Role	Notes
2022	Petrol	Masha	
2021	The Wake	Svetlana	Short
2015	Force of Destiny	Mrs Brodie	
2014	Rabbit	Sonia	Short
2013	Galore	Luisa	
2012	The Land Between	Alisa	Short
2012	Agency Time	Traveller	Short
2003	Balmain Boys	Katerina	
2003	The Technical Writer	Risa	
2001	Russian Doll	Katia	
1998	The Venus Factory	Tasha	
1996	Gunsmoke		Short
1996	Cody: Fall from Grace	Petra	
