= Russian Doll (film) =

2001 Australian film

- Theatrical release poster
- Directed by: Stavros Kazantzidis
- Written by: Stavros Kazantzidis; Allanah Zitserman
- Produced by: Allanah Zitserman
- Starring: Hugo Weaving; David Wenham
- Cinematography: Justin Brickle
- Edited by: Andrew Macneil
- Music by: Mark Rivett
- Production company: Beyond Films
- Distributed by: Beyond Films (AUS); Mushroom Pictures (AUS); Lot 47 Films (US)
- Release date: April 6, 2001
- Running time: 90 mins
- Country: Australia
- Language: English
- Box office: A$464,065 (Australia)

Russian Doll is a 2001 Australian romantic comedy film directed by Stavros Kazantzidis and produced by Allanah Zitserman, starring Hugo Weaving, David Wenham and Natalia Novikova Set in and around the Bondi Beach area of Sydney, Australia, the film follows Harvey, a neurotic private investigator and wannabe crime writer, who gets asked to marry his best friend's mistress. The film was released on 6 April 2001.

== Plot ==
Harvey, a self-doubting private investigator, plans to marry his girlfriend until he is hired to solve an adultery case and discovers the adulterer is cheating with his fiancée. Lost and dejected, Harvey quits his job and wallows in booze and the occasional odd blind date. Meanwhile, Katia, a Jewish woman from St. Petersburg, arrives in Sydney after answering an ad from an international matchmaking agency. But instead of love, she finds her prospective groom dead on arrival. Stranded in a foreign city with no one to turn to, Katia meets Ethan, a married man and Harvey's best friend. Ethan is soon scheming to figure out a way to keep Katia in the country without his wife Miriam discovering the affair. Ethan comes up with the perfect solution: he offers Harvey enough money to start writing the novel he has always dreamed of, if he agrees to marry Katia. Harvey is appalled by the idea. Ethan's marriage had been his only example that love can faithfully exist. However, since he needs the money to get started on the book, he reluctantly agrees to let Katia move in. But soon this "marriage of convenience" is anything but, as Miriam learns about the upcoming nuptials and is so pleased that her husband's best friend has finally found someone, she insists on turning the wedding into a grand affair. Inevitably, Ethan and Harvey's friendship is tested and hidden emotions are revealed between Harvey and Katia. Amid all the chaos of planning the wedding, every one is left to wonder, is this any way to find true love?

== Cast ==
- Hugo Weaving as Harvey
- David Wenham as Ethan
- Natalia Novikova as Katia
- Rebecca Frith as Miriam
- Sacha Horler as Liza
- Felicity Price as Phaedra
- Laurie Foell as Eve Davenport

== Reception ==
Russian Doll received generally positive reviews from critics. The Movie Show with Margaret and David had a positive review of Russian Doll, on Episode 16 2001. David Stratton said of the film, "Writer/Director Stavros Kazantzidis and co-writer Allanah Zitserman, have come up with an engaging latter-day screwball comedy with Russian Doll, which is traditionally plotted, but beautiful acted. The basic idea, take a couple who dislike each-other and throw them together until they inevitably they fall in love is far from new, but it comes up fresh here thanks to the brisk playing, strong cast and delightful surprises, like the appearance of Sacha Horler as a clingy Russian friend of Katia, who latches on to the unwilling Harvey. There are livelky songs and music on the soundtrack, and there's plenty of fun to be found in this very likeable romance." Margaret Pomeranz also received it well, noting that "It's not a genre that Australian films have tackled very often, and not very often with great success either, but i think this works. I think Hugo [Weaving] makes a lovely romantic leading man, and she [Natalia Novikova] is just so alive, she just bursts onto that screen. She's fabulous. And I love the texture of the Russian community in Sydney." David continued "It's a modest film, but it achieves everything it sets out to achieve". They both gave it a 3.5 star rating.

=== Awards and nominations ===
Award	Category	Subject	Result
Australian Film Institute	Best Performance by an Actress in a Supporting Role	Sacha Horler	Nominated
	Australian Film Institute Award for Best Screenplay	Stavros Kazantzidis, Allanah Zitserman	Won
