= Stavros Kazantzidis =

Greek-Australian writer, director and producer

Stavros Kazantzidis is an Australian-Greek writer, director, and producer. He graduated from the Australian Film, Television and Radio School in 1992. His graduation film, Road to Alice, won Best Short Film at the Australian Film Institute Awards. He was also the winner of 'Young Filmmaker of the Year' at the Edinburgh International Film Festival that same year. Kazantzidis wrote, directed, and produced Love & Other Catastrophes, the international indie hit, which was nominated for Best Film in 1996 at the Australian Film Institute Award. In 2000, Kazantzidis's film Russian Doll won the Best Original Screenplay at the Australian Film Institute Awards.

== Filmography ==
- Mother Mountain (2022)
- Horseplay (2003)
- In the Cut (2003)
- Russian Doll (2000)
- Strange Planet (1999)
- True Love & Chaos (1997)
- Love & Other Catastrophes (1996)
- Road to Alice (1990)
