= Howard T. Owens =

American media executive

Howard Owens
- Education: Southern Methodist University
- Occupations: Founder & Co-CEO, Propagate Content
- Spouse: Marnie Owens

Howard Thomas Owens is an American media executive who is the founder and Co-CEO of Propagate Content.

== Early life ==
Born to Howard T. Owens Jr., an American politician, lawyer, and judge. Before launching his media career, Owens was an attorney in private practice in Bridgeport, Connecticut, where he also served as a staff clerk for the Office of the State's Attorney. Owens is a graduate of Southern Methodist University (BA) and received his Juris Doctor from the Quinnipiac University School of Law.

== Career ==
=== William Morris Agency ===
Prior to Reveille, Owens was an agent in the corporate consulting and television packaging divisions at the William Morris Agency, representing television producers as well as top brands including Maxim Magazine, InStyle Magazine, eBay and Miramax Films. Before working at William Morris, he co-founded and served as a managing partner for Outdoor Concepts, a privately held outdoor media company that was purchased by Titan Media/New York.

=== Reveille ===
In 2002, Howard T. Owens served as Managing Director, Co-Head of Domestic Television and Head of Digital for Reveille LLC, which he co-founded with Ben Silverman. Owens was responsible for creating and developing a wide range of innovative programming and content for television and across various online platforms.

While at Reveille, Owens was the co-creator and executive producer of Nashville Star, which aired for five seasons on USA Network and debuted on NBC in the summer of 2008. Owens also executive produced American Gladiators, the hit show from NBC that premiered in January 2008, and was a co-executive producer of NBC's The Biggest Loser, My Dad Is Better Than Your Dad, MasterChef, and One Born Every Minute, as well as Eyes on Target on the History Channel.

Owens is also the co-creator and co-executive producer of NBC's The Restaurant, Bravo's Blow-Out, and MTV's Date My Mom and Parental Control. He executive produced the first two seasons of F/X's 30 Days, as well as ESPN's Bound for Glory, an eight-episode docu-series that Reveille produced in partnership with Full Circle Entertainment and was fully financed by Dodge, State Farm, and Reebok. Owens also crafted Reveille's landmark deal with Microsoft, whereby Reveille created and produced online content for MSN. Additionally, in digital, he produced over 20 web series including Who Knew?, Fit to Boom, Real-Life Makeover with Holly Robinson Peete, and Appetite for Life with Andrew Zimmerman, among others.

Owens departed Reveille in June 2011.

=== National Geographic Channels ===
On 4 November 2011, Owens was named President of National Geographic Channels where he oversaw the programming, development, communications, research, and business affairs units at the U.S. networks.

=== Propagate Content ===
In March 2015, Owens founded Propagate Content, an independent TV production company, backed by A&E Networks. Owens was the founding CEO of the company. He and chief creative officer David McKillop, former A&E channel general manager, are also owners of the company. In May 2015, Propagate announced key hires and had a small slate of projects in development: Apple's first original unscripted television series, produced in partnership with musician and tech entrepreneur will.i.am and a scripted series, Isn't That Rich? with ABC Studios, and Red Team for Amazon.

By April 2016, McKillop had exited the company, at which time Ben Silverman joined the company as co-chairman and co-CEO, bringing with him a handful of projects from Electus. A&E Networks had also given another round of funding to the company.

In early June 2016, the Oxygen Channel greenlit Propagate's Unprotected, a docu-comedy. In January 2017, Propagate started up its international distribution division head by president Cyrus Farrokh. The company signed in February 2017 to develop, pitch, and produce in the U.S. market Caracol formats.

By January 2018, Propagate Content agreed to create content based on stars Gwyneth Paltrow, and Grammy Award winner Zac Brown, and lifestyle brands. Also, its slate included 17 series in production and 40 development projects across 21 channels and streaming services.

Propagate Content received additional investment in January 2018 from The Raine Group to speed up growth and fund targeted acquisitions and new ventures. In April 2018, Propagate invested in Incognita, former Europacorp Deputy CEO Edouard de Vesinne's production company, as its European production arm. The company was also in the process of setting up a podcast studio to develop properties due to its success in adapting the Lore podcast to TV and the Sword and Scale podcast series. Propagate purchased Electus, including its majority share in Artists First, from IAC in October 2018 using Raine's funds.

== Awards ==
As part of the "30 Days" production team, Owens received two 2007 Insight Awards of Excellence from the National Association of Film and Digital Media Artists for his work on the "Atheist/Christian" episode and for outsourcing other episodes. In addition, Owens received a GLAAD Award for the episode "Straight/Gay" and has been honored by the Muslim Public Affairs Council with its 2005 Voice of Courage and Conscience Media Award for the episode "Muslims and America". He was also nominated for a PGA award for his work on "30 Days."

== Credits ==
Year	Production	Role
2003–2004	The Restaurant	Co-executive producer
2003–2008	Nashville Star	Executive producer
2004–2006	Date My Mom	Executive producer
2005	Bound for Glory	Executive producer
2005–2008	30 Days	Executive producer
2006–2010	Parental Control	Executive producer
2005–2009	The Biggest Loser	Co-executive producer
2007–2010	Shear Genius	Executive producer
2008	American Gladiators	Executive producer
2008–2009	Kath & Kim	Executive producer
2010	Shear Genius	Executive producer
2011	MasterChef	Executive producer
2011	One Born Every Minute	Executive producer
2008–2013	Tabatha's Salon Takeover	Executive producer
2013	Killing Kennedy	Executive producer
2016	Jackie	Executive producer
2017	Planet of the Apps	Executive producer
2017–2018	Lore	Executive producer
2018	November 13: Attack on Paris	Producer
2018–present	Charmed	Executive producer
2018–present	In Search of...	Executive producer
2018–present	Haunted	Executive producer
2019–present	Blood & Treasure	Executive producer
2019–present	Hot Date	Executive producer
2019–present	Prank Encounters	Executive producer
2019–present	Kings of Pain	Executive producer
2023	Untold: Jake Paul the Problem Child	Executive producer
