= Identity (game show) =

American TV game show

- Created by: Tim Puntillo
- Developed by: Reveille Productions
- Presented by: Penn Jillette
- Narrated by: Joe Cipriano
- Country of origin: United States
- No. of seasons: 1
- No. of episodes: 12

Production
- Executive producers: Ben Silverman; H.T. Owens; Andrew Golder; Tim Puntillo
- Camera setup: Multi-camera
- Running time: 60 minutes
- Production companies: A Golder Productions; Valencia Productions Incorporated; Reveille Productions

Original release
- Network: NBC
- Release: December 18, 2006 – April 27, 2007

Identity is an American game show, created by Tim Puntillo, and produced by Reveille Productions for NBC. Hosted by magician Penn Jillette (of Penn & Teller), with narrations by Joe Cipriano, the format focuses on contestants working out which facts are linked to one of 12 strangers in each episodes, through visual observations and deductions, with correct matches increasing the prize money they can walk away – up to a jackpot of $500,000 for matching all identities. Contestants have access to lifelines, denoted as "helps", which can assist at times, and may also ask questions to some of the strangers at various points during the game show.

Identity ran for only one season, beginning strongly with its premiere on December 18, 2006, before ratings declined over the course of its broadcast until its final episode on April 27, 2007. Despite plans to air a second season, NBC chose not to commission further episodes, though the format was later leased to other countries including France, Russia and the United Kingdom.

== Format ==
In each episode, a contestant is introduced to 12 different strangers each standing on number podiums, before being given a list of 12 "identities" – each is a fact pertaining to each stranger, regarding elements such as occupations, hobbies, height or weight, age, and so forth, some of which can allude to multiple strangers. The contestants task is to try to deduce which stranger corresponds to each fact, sometimes through visual observations, and at certain points, through asking questions about the stranger's background. The strangers may provide their first name, either at the beginning or during the course of the episode, and are often dressed in misleading outfits to disguise their identity. During the course of the game show, contestants can sometimes be aided with opinions from close friends and family members attending their participation.

If a contestant decides to link a fact to a stranger, they must "seal the identity" with their own podium, to which the host Jillette will then ask that stranger if this is their identity. A correct match will increase the prize money the contestant earns, as listed in the table below:

Correct matches	Amount won
1	$1,000
2	$5,000
3	$10,000
4	$15,000
5	$25,000
6	$50,000
7	$75,000
8	$100,000
9	$150,000
10	$250,000
11 (and 12)	$500,000

At any point during the game, the contestant may choose to quit the game with the winnings won up to that point. However, while the contestant can make one mistake with an identity (dubbed the "Mistaken Identity" help, which may not be used once the contestant reaches $250,000 with two identities remaining), a second mistake will lose them the game and leave them with nothing. At times, the contestant can rely on two lifelines (denoted as "helps") to aid them:

- Tri-dentity: A chosen identity is narrowed down to three strangers, to which the contestant must correctly match the identity to one of these three (or quit the game) and cannot pick another identity until then. This help is only active until there is just four strangers remaining.
- Ask The Experts: Contestants may ask a panel of three experts to give them informed opinions on which stranger can be matched to a chosen identity. These experts have no inside knowledge of the strangers and can only rely on their professional training and experience to make educated guesses. The contestant is not bound to relying on their opinions and can choose another identity to work on if unsure. This help is available at any point in the game.

=== Other helps ===
In addition to the three explained helps, there are several other points of assistance offered to the contestant:

- During Identity’s premiere week, Jillette would ask the contestant which stranger they wanted to know more about. He would then ask that stranger their first name and several pieces of information which are not directly related to any of the identities, such as whether they had any pets. When Identity debuted as a weekly series, this was formalized: at the beginning of the game, the contestant may ask for the first names and a biographical fact about three of the twelve strangers. After the third correct match, the contestant could ask about two of the remaining nine strangers, and after the sixth match, may ask about one of the remaining six.
- After the fourth correct match, Jillette would introduce the contestant's friends or family members. The friends and family typically have a suggestion prepared as to the identity of one of the strangers after they are introduced. However, the friends or family members may sometimes lead a person to match an identity to the wrong stranger or take the money when they would have won a bigger prize.
- The audience is not obligated to remain silent until an identity is sealed. The audience often voices their opinion on a selection. Occasionally when a contestant fails to recognize a celebrity of some sort and tries to select their for the wrong identity, the audience can dissuade the contestant with their reaction.
- Jillette himself, particularly on early identities, has shown apparent intention on warning, or hinting at the contestants when they are making a blatantly-erroneous selection, though he also sometimes is prevented from doing so by a contestant's quick sealing of an identity.

=== Identities and strangers ===
The 12 strangers stand on individually numbered podiums and are referred to mainly by number, though names are often revealed in the progress of the show.

Usually at least one identity is made blatantly obvious from physical appearance alone (blatant examples include a "Sumo wrestler" in fighting garb, and a "George W. Bush impersonator"). Celebrity strangers may be easily recognizable by the contestant or the contestant's friends (once they are allowed to help). There were no intentionally misleading costumes (e.g., a physicist dressed as a sumo wrestler when both "physicist" and "sumo wrestler" were possible identities), although strangers often break stereotypes (e.g., a female prison guard, a goateed, long-haired nuclear physicist wearing a leather jacket, or a preschool teacher dressed in a bikini). There was even a missionary wearing a bikini in one episode.

Strangers have confirmed their identities in a variety of ways; musicians, for example, have been handed instruments and asked to play if they can (similarly, opera singer Jennifer Wallace revealed her identity by holding a very high note). Some "skill" identities have been confirmed by demonstration; for example, a go-go dancer danced on stage. Sometimes strangers perform from their podiums, while others are brought to the front of the main stage. Other strangers confirm their identities with a remark which pertains to their identity. An NFL player hesitated and then signaled "It's good" with his hands signaling a field goal, while a mall Santa laughed "ho ho ho". Most follow their comment up with "Yes, I am [the identity]" (though the audience reaction often masks this), and some strangers say only that.

In cases where the stranger is prepared to demonstrate his or her identity, but the contestant selects the wrong stranger for that identity, the mistaken stranger will be asked to try to demonstrate that identity, only to refuse at the last moment and confirm he is not that identity. Strangers that were prepared to demonstrate their identity but were not given the opportunity (the player loses or quits the game) may be asked to demonstrate this when the full answers are revealed to the player.

== Interactive game ==
During the program's broadcast in December 2006, Identity was accompanied by an interactive game, in a similar arrangement to other NBC game shows such as Deal or No Deal and 1 vs. 100. Designed as an at-home game open to residents of the continental United States called "The Identity Challenge", players who participated were chosen at random and could win won $10,000 by choosing which of five strangers represents a product, or a profession related to the advertised product.

On the first two nights, three of the five were revealed to be incorrect throughout the game, and the answer was revealed before the final commercial break. On the next three, there was no such narrowing; all five strangers remained throughout the show. To encourage viewers to watch television commercials during the show, the correct answer to the "Identity Challenge" question was revealed during a related commercial within the first 20 minutes of the show. The interactive feature was later dropped before the program's sixth episode on March 16, 2007.

== Ratings and episode air dates ==
Episode number	Air date	Rating	Share	18–49	Total Viewers
1	December 18, 2006	7.6	12	4.5	12.1
2	December 19, 2006	5.4	9	3.0	8.4
3	December 20, 2006	5.5	9	3.0	8.5
4	December 21, 2006	6.1	11	3.1	9.2
5	December 22, 2006	5.0	9	2.4	7.4
6	March 16, 2007	5.8	10	2.9	8.7
7	March 23, 2007	3.7	8	1.8	5.5
8	March 30, 2007	4.8	8	1.6	6.4
9	April 6, 2007	4.1	8	1.7	5.8
10	April 13, 2007	4.4	8	1.9	6.3
11	April 20, 2007	3.3	6	1.4	4.7
12	April 27, 2007	3.5	7	1.5	5.0

== International versions ==
Country	Name	Host	Channel	Prize	Year aired
Albania	Të panjohurit	Ardit Gjebrea	TV Klan	€20,000	January 10, 2021 – present
Argentina	Los desconocidos de siempre	Alex Caniggia	El Trece	AR$2,000,000	January 9, 2023 – August 19, 2023
Azerbaijan	Kim kimdir?	Azer Axsham (2008–2010); Vusal Murtuzaliyev (2017–2018)	Azad Azerbaijan TV	10,000₼	2008–2010; 2017–2018
Bulgaria	Скрита самоличност Skrita samolichnost	Gerasim Georgiev - Gero	NOVA	100,000лв	June 3, 2024 – December 31, 2024
Chile	Identity	Vivi Kreutzberger	Mega	Cl$50,000,000	March 22, 2010
China	猜的就是你	Zhang Shaogang	Guangxi TV	Gift pack of family's dream	January 2, 2013
Denmark	Identity-hvem er hvem?	Thomas Mygind	Kanal 5	500,000kr	February 14, 2008
Finland	Tuntemattomat	Jaakko Saariluoma	MTV3	€30,000	January 11, 2008 – June 12, 2009
France	Identity	Jean-Luc Reichmann	TF1	€150,000	February 14, 2009 – June 5, 2010
Georgia	ინტუიცია Intuitsiya	Nika Kavtaradze	Imedi TV	20,000ლ	May 13, 2010 – mid-2010s
Greece	Tαυτότητα; Taftótita	Miltos Makrides	Star Channel	€150,000	2007
Hong Kong	亮相	Eric Kot	TVB	HK$200,000	May 5, 2008
Italy	Soliti ignoti – Identità nascoste Soliti ignoti – Il ritorno	Fabrizio Frizzi (2007–2012); Amadeus (2017–2023)	Rai 1	€250,000 €500,000	2007–2012; 2017–2023
Italy	Chissà chi è	Amadeus	NOVE	€200,000 €400,000	September 22, 2024 – January 30, 2025
Israel	מסדר זיהוי; Misdar Zihui	Shlomo Baraba	Channel 10	₪500,000	June 13, 2007
Mexico	Identidad	Andrés Bustamante	Azteca 13	MX$250,000	July 18, 2007
Russia	Интуиция; Супер-Интуиция; Intuitsiya; Superintuitsiya	Viktor Loginov	TNT	1,000,000 руб. 500,000 руб.	September 7, 2007 – April 27, 2013
Singapore	Identity	Muhammad Syamim	Mediacorp Channel 5 (2007–2009); Events TV Plus (2017–end-2010s)	S$100,000	August 27, 2007 – December 26, 2009; October 19, 2017 – end-2010s
South Korea	공통점을 찾아라	Suh Kyung-Suk	SBS	50,000,000₩	March 2008
Spain	Identity	Antonio Garrido	La 1	€100,000	July 16, 2007 – September 15, 2008
Thailand	ใครคือใคร Identity Thailand	Kathsepsawad Palakawong na Ayuthaya	MCOT Channel 9 (2013–2014); Workpoint TV (2015–2016)	฿100,000	February 7, 2013 – February 13, 2016
Turkey	Kimsin Sen	Mustafa Sandal	Star TV	150.000 TL	February 14, 2010 – 2010s
Ukraine	Інтуїція (1–4 season); Суперінтуїція (5–9 season); Intuitsiya; Superintuitsiya	Andriy Domanskyi (1–2 season); Alexander Pedan (3–4 season); Serhiy Prytula (5–9 season)	Novyi Kanal	50,000 ₴	January 8, 2010 – December 30, 2011; August 27, 2015 – May 13, 2020
United Kingdom	Identity	Donny Osmond	BBC Two	£10,000	2007
