= Ben Silverman =

American media executive (born 1970)

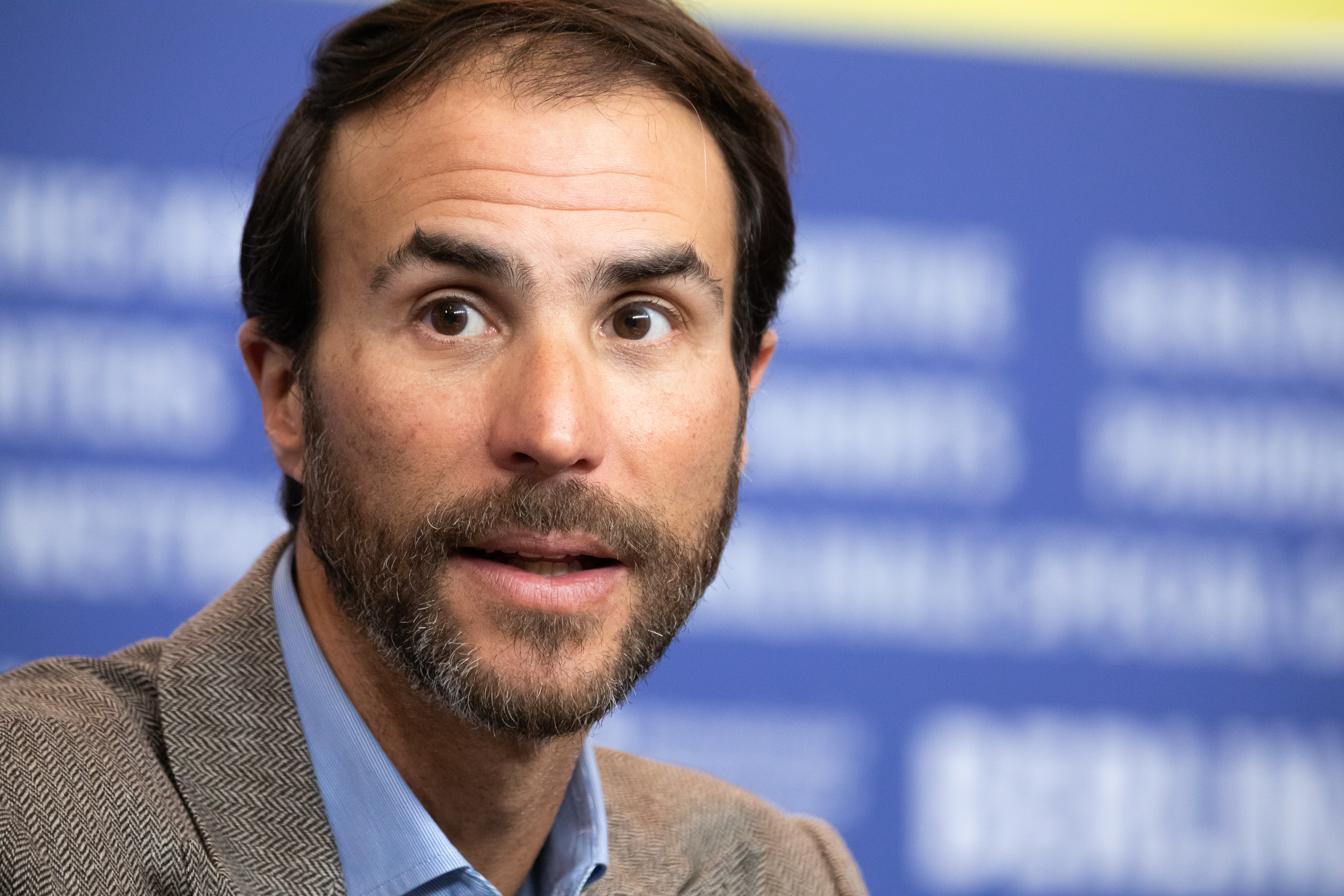
- Silverman in 2020
- Born: Benjamin Noah Silverman; Pittsfield, Massachusetts, US
- Education: Tufts University
- Occupations: Chairman, Propagate Content
- Spouse: Jennifer Cuoco (m. 2010)
- Father: Stanley Silverman

Benjamin Noah Silverman is an American media executive. He is the co-CEO and chairman of the entertainment production company Propagate.

From 2007–2009, Silverman served as co-chairman of NBC Entertainment and Universal Media Studios. He is also an Emmy, Golden Globe, Peabody, and NAACP-winning executive producer of such shows as The Office, Jane The Virgin, Ugly Betty, Marco Polo, The Tudors,The Biggest Loser, Stick, and Best Medicine.Silverman is a New York Times Best Seller author of Welcome to Dunder Mifflin: The Ultimate Oral History of the Office—The Definitive History of the Landmark TV Show, and The Night Before Christmas at Dunder Mifflin. Silverman also produced CW's praised No Tomorrow and Apple's first television show Planet of the Apps. On July 10, 2014, The Banff World Media Festival presented Silverman with the Award of Excellence in Digital Innovation. As of the fourth quarter 2016, Silverman's most recently released feature film Hands of Stone starring Edgar Ramirez, Robert De Niro and Usher, and was released theatrically in North America on August 26, 2016 through The Weinstein Company. Silverman Executive Produced a number of documentaries including the Hillary for Hulu in 2020; Untold sports documentary series for Netflix; I’m Chevy Chase and You’re Not for CNN; The Last First: Winter K2 for Apple; LFG for HBO Max; and Jerry West: The Logo for Prime Video.

== Life and career ==
Silverman was born in Pittsfield, Massachusetts. He was raised in a Reform Jewish family in Manhattan where he attended Rodeph Sholom School. Silverman is a 1992 magna cum laude graduate of Tufts University, where he majored in history and belonged to the Epsilon Theta chapter of the Theta Chi fraternity. His mother, Mary (Delson) Silverman, was an actress and programming executive whose career included employment at the Disney Channel, BBC, USA Network, Lifetime Television, and Court TV. His father, Stanley Silverman, is a music composer/arranger.

He had summer internships at Warner Bros., and after college in 1993, worked at CBS and then worked for Brandon Tartikoff at New World Entertainment. He worked for the William Morris Agency starting in 1995; Silverman was in charge of the international packaging division, where he was the company's youngest division head, packaging more than 25 television series, including Who Wants to Be a Millionaire, Weakest Link, Big Brother, and Queer as Folk. He worked for William Morris Agency until 2002, when he left to found Reveille.

In 2007, Silverman received the P.T. Barnum Award from Tufts University for his exceptional work in the field of media and entertainment. Silverman is involved with multiple philanthropic endeavors, including Seeds of Peace, a group helping to foster peace among young people from adversarial cultures. In addition, Silverman sits on the Cedars-Sinai Hospital board of governors. Silverman also serves on the board of directors of Best Buddies, a non-profit organization dedicated to enhancing the lives of people with intellectual disabilities by providing guidance and integrated employment.

In 2008, Silverman received an Honorary Rose for lifetime achievement the Rose d'Or ceremony.

In 2009, Silverman received a Brandon Tartikoff Legacy Award.

Silverman married Jennifer Cuoco, a real estate agent, in December 2010.

=== Reveille ===
Silverman is the founder of Reveille, a television, film, and theater production and distribution company now owned by Shine Limited under News Corporation. He founded Reveille in 2002 in order to exploit international formats by selling them in the United States. Through his work at Reveille, he is the executive producer of such shows as NBC's The Office, The Restaurant, The Biggest Loser, and ABC's Ugly Betty, as well as several cable shows, including Nashville Star, on USA Network, 30 Days on FX, MTV's Parental Control and Date My Mom, Blow Out on Bravo, and House of Boateng on the Sundance TV.

Journalist Michael Wolff wrote a 2001 profile of Silverman in New York Magazine a year before he founded Reveille. "In some sense, he's like those boy geniuses of the eighties and nineties who invented new financial instruments -- junk bonds and derivatives and whatnot. The discovery and marketing of a new format is really like that. It's creating something that is negotiable and transferable and that people believe in deeply -- it solves all their problems. Now, obviously, there is a certain obsolescence to these formats (with junk bonds you had inevitable bankruptcies). And Ben, of course, is already searching the world for new formats. Variety shows might be a possibility," Wolff wrote.

=== NBC ===
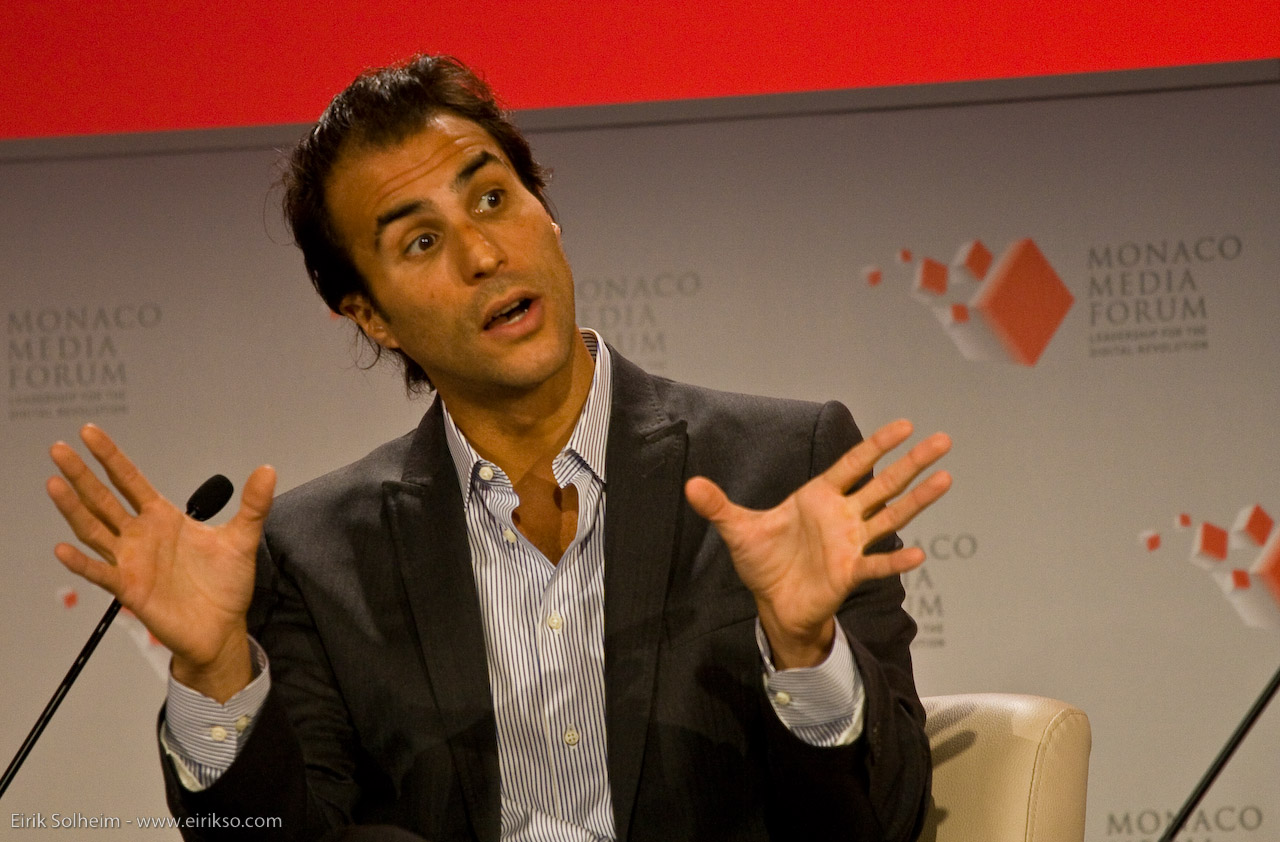
NBC Entertainment co-chairman Silverman in November 2008

Silverman was named co-chairman of NBC Entertainment in 2007 (along with Marc Graboff), succeeding Kevin Reilly. That same year, Silverman was the first producer since Norman Lear, 34 years earlier, to have two shows nominated for an Emmy in the best comedy category (The Office and Ugly Betty). He is credited for his role in saving the critically acclaimed but low-rated NBC drama Friday Night Lights by striking an innovative deal with DirecTV. The satellite television provider agreed to take on a substantial amount of the show's production budget in exchange for exclusive first-window airing rights on its 101 channel. NBC would then repurpose the episodes to be aired on the network later in the season.

=== Electus ===
On July 27, 2009, Silverman announced he was leaving NBC to form a new company, Electus, in partnership with Barry Diller's IAC/InterActiveCorp, that would produce and distribute programs across media platforms, for television, the Web and mobile devices. As part of its inception, IAC partnered Electus with the interactive comedy portal CollegeHumor. In January 2010, Silverman and Electus partnered with Jason Bateman and Will Arnett to launch their sponsor-driven advertising and digital production company DumbDumb. Electus also has partnerships with 5x5 and DiGa. On May 8, 2014, The CW announced a first season order for Silverman's new television show Jane The Virgin.

=== Acting roles ===
Silverman had a cameo appearance in the first episode of the fifth season of the television show Entourage. Silverman read a single line in which he expressed annoyance at Johnny Drama wasting his time.

Silverman appeared in four episodes during the ninth season of the television show The Office, starting with "Here Comes Treble"; he played Isaac, one of Jim's business partners.

== Credits ==
List of Silverman productions
Year	Production	Role
2003–2004	The Restaurant	Executive producer
2003–2008	Nashville Star	Executive producer
2005–2008	30 Days	Executive producer
2005–2011	The Office	Executive producer
2005–2011	The Biggest Loser	Co-creator / Executive producer
2006–2011	Ugly Betty	Executive producer
2007–2010	The Tudors	Co-creator / Executive producer
2008–2009	Kath & Kim	Executive producer
2010	MacGruber	Co-executive producer
2011–2016	Mob Wives	Executive producer
2011–2015	King of the Nerds	Executive producer
2013	Get Out Alive with Bear Grylls	Executive producer
2014	Killer Women	Executive producer
2014–2019	Jane the Virgin	Executive producer
2014–2016	Marco Polo	Executive producer
2015	Breaking Greenville	Executive producer
2016	Hands of Stone	Executive producer
2016	No Tomorrow	Executive producer
2017	Planet of the Apps	Executive producer
2017–2018	Lore	Executive producer
2018	November 13: Attack on Paris	Producer
2018–2022	Charmed	Executive producer
2018–2021	Haunted	Executive producer
2019–2022	Blood & Treasure	Executive producer
2019–2021	Prank Encounters	Executive producer
2019–present	Kings of Pain	Executive producer
2020	Broke	Executive producer
2021-2022	Our Kind of People	Executive producer
2021-2022	American Song Contest	Executive producer
2023	Untold: Jake Paul the Problem Child	Executive producer
2024	Reunion	Producer
2024	Incoming	Producer
