= Endemol Shine North America =

American television production company

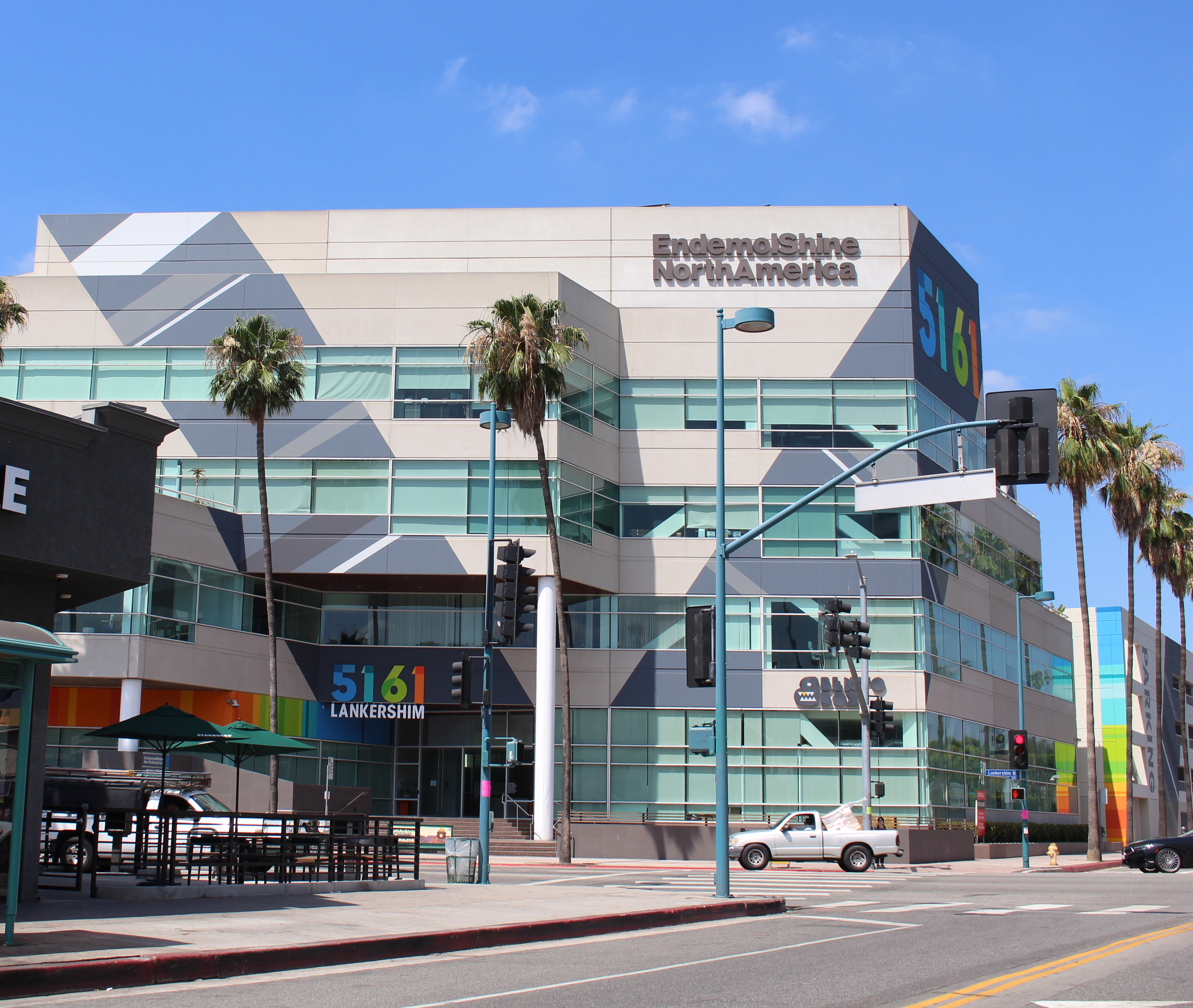
- Headquarters in North Hollywood
- Formerly: Reveille Productions (2002–2012); Shine America (2012–2015)
- Type: Subsidiary
- Industry: Television production; Distribution
- Predecessors: Endemol USA; Shine Americas; Shine USA
- Founded: March 21, 2002; 24 years ago
- Founder: Ben Silverman
- Headquarters: 5161 Lankershim Blvd, Los Angeles, California, United States
- Key people: Sharon Levy (CEO)
- Parent: USA Entertainment (2002–2008); Shine Group (2008–2015); Endemol Shine Group (2015–2020); Banijay Entertainment (2010–2026; 2026–present)
- Subsidiaries: 51 Minds Entertainment; Truly Original
- Website: endemolshine.us

Endemol Shine North America (stylized as EndemolShine NorthAmerica) is the American division of Banijay Entertainment that was founded on March 15, 2012, as a merger of Shine Americas, Shine USA, and Reveille Productions.

Endemol Shine North America produces and distributes scripted and unscripted television and digital content through its global Shine 360˚ division. Endemol Shine North America has produced original series including The Biggest Loser, Tabatha Takes Over, The Face, and Parental Control; adaptations of Shine Group formats MasterChef, Minute to Win It, One Born Every Minute, and The Office, Ugly Betty, and The Tudors; and over 20 original online series on MSN, Yahoo!, YouTube premium channels and other platforms. Through Banijay's distribution arm, Banijay Rights, Endemol Shine North America distributes to more than 150 countries.

== History ==
Endemol Shine North America began its operations under the name Reveille Productions, an independently owned television and motion picture studio and production company based in Los Angeles. The studio was founded by Ben Silverman on March 21, 2002, originally as an independent company under USA Entertainment, a division of Vivendi Universal Entertainment (now NBCUniversal). Reveille's first production was the reality television series The Restaurant, premiering the following year. The company logo name Reveille is based on the bugle call used to wake up military personnel and their company logo features a bugler in action.

In November 2007, when Ben Silverman accepted the job of becoming the entertainment head and chairman of NBCUniversal's NBC Entertainment division and couldn't profit from any further projects associated with Reveille, it was announced that the London-based, Elisabeth Murdoch-owned 'super-indie' production company named Shine Group was finalising an agreement to buy Reveille Productions. A year later in February 2008, Shine Group announced that they had completed their acquisition of Reveille Productions, placing it under their operations to become Shine Group's first US division, with Reveille's distribution arm being moved to Shine Group as an international division with Reveille Distribution being renamed as ShineReveille International. Also in that same year, ShineReveille International made a deal with Merv Griffin Entertainment to distribute all of MGE programming overseas.

In March 2012, Shine Group announced that it was restructuring and rebranding its American operations, with Reveille Productions dropping its brand and merging with Shine Group's other US divisions, Shine Americas and Shine USA, to become a new single entitled American division named Shine America. On March 25, 2012, Shine America announced that it had launched an entertainment programming division dedicated to creating and developing formats for the US and global marketplace named Ardaban, with former Notional co-president Chachi Senior becoming CEO of the new division.

In June 2012, Shine America announced that it had signed a deal with EMJAG Digital Productions and New Regency to create and distribute digital content with the former company's pre-existing deal with Paramount having expired and transitioned their digital content partnership to Shine America, with Shine America along with New Regency co-producing and co-financing digital projects through a first-look deal.

In January 2013, Shine America announced that they had launched Shine Hispanic & Latin America, their new Spanish-language division for producing and developing Spanish-language scripted and un-scripted programming. BE-TV's founder and president Christina Palaco joined as the president of Shine America's new division.

=== Endemol USA ===
Endemol USA was the US production branch of Endemol based in Los Angeles, California. It had been in operation since 2000. The branch produced programs based on Endemol's worldwide formats for the major American TV networks, such as Fear Factor, Deal or No Deal and 1 vs. 100 for NBC; Extreme Makeover: Home Edition, Show Me the Money, The One: Making a Music Star, Set for Life, and Wipeout for ABC; Exposed for MTV; Big Brother and Kid Nation for CBS; Midnight Money Madness for TBS (under the moniker Lock and Key Productions) and most recently, a game show adaptation of 20Q for GSN. Their worst faring franchise by far is The One which was canceled after four episodes. Fear Factor was canceled after six seasons and was later revived for an additional season by NBC in 2011; a new version began airing on MTV in 2017. Another one of their shows, Big Brother has two seasons already out on DVD. While Big Brother has had the most international success to date, their most successful US program could end up being either Deal or No Deal or Extreme Makeover: Home Edition.

Endemol USA created Midnight Money Madness for cable's TBS network, in which viewers can call in to play games and win money prizes. It is based on Endemol's successful Participation TV format. On October 13, 2006, Endemol USA launched another game show for NBC, 1 vs. 100 with Bob Saget, and debuted as another ratings winner. On November 14, 2006, ABC premiered Show Me the Money, with William Shatner as its host. Midnight Money Madness was canceled in October 2006 after 32 episodes, in which its successor, Take the Cake, premiered on July 9, 2007, and Show Me the Money was canceled in December 2006 after only five episodes aired. A syndicated version of Deal or No Deal aired from 2008 to 2010 (the show was revived for CNBC in 2018), while Wipeout aired from 2008 to 2015 on ABC. In October 2008, Tokyo Broadcasting System filed a lawsuit against ABC (with a separate suit against Endemol pending) for claims that Wipeout copied elements from two of their popular shows, Takeshi's Castle (known as MXC in the USA) and Sasuke (better known in the US as Ninja Warrior). Endemol USA also produces the Style Network hour-long reality series Jerseylicious, which debuted in 2010.

In June 2010, Endemol picked up the distribution rights to the TV Land sitcom Hot in Cleveland, which it will distribute internationally. This marked the first time that Endemol has acquired an American-produced scripted series. Other scripted properties that Endemol also owns rights to include Happily Divorced and The Exes, also airing on TV Land.

In 2011, Endemol expanded its American production portfolio to include more non-reality fare, starting with The Steve Harvey Show, distributed by NBCUniversal Television Distribution. The hour-long talk/variety program premiered on 10 September 2012 in syndication and ran for five seasons before being replaced by a similarly titled show that is produced by IMG. Another program, the mob-related crime drama Red Widow, aired on ABC as a mid-season replacement in the 2012–2013 television season.

Endemol USA Latino produces Endemol USA's successful shows in Spanish language as shown on the major Hispanic TV networks. Their first production, Vas o No Vas, was based on the popular Deal or No Deal, and aired on Telemundo. Unlike Endemol USA's headquarters in Los Angeles, Endemol USA Latino has headquarters located in Miami, Florida.

Endemol USA owns True Entertainment and majority stakes in the unscripted production companies Authentic Entertainment, 51 Minds Entertainment, and Original Media.

At the 2015 Digital Content NewFronts, Endemol Beyond announced new channels Looksy and Smasher.

==== Authentic Entertainment, LLC ====
On August 10, 2010, Endemol B.V. announced the acquisition of a majority share of Authentic Entertainment Inc. by Endemol North America, with unverified reports claiming the deal worth US$ 60–70 million.

On January 31, 2025, Authentic Entertainment was folded into 51 Minds Entertainment.

==== Truly Original ====
Through its New York City subsidiary True Entertainment, it produced unscripted programs such as The Real Housewives of Atlanta, Catch It Keep It, A Baby Story, Whose Wedding Is It Anyway?, Mystery Diagnosis, The Robert Verdi Show, The A-List: New York, Make Room for Multiples, and Fashion Queens.

Earlier shows include Personal Conviction, Rebuilt: The Human Body Shop, A World Away, Band in a Bubble, Married Away, Mystery Medicine, Under One Roof, What's Your Sign Design?, HGTV Design Star, Unwrapping Macy's, Widow on the Hill, Operation Homecoming: Writing the Wartime Experience, Go Ahead, Make My Dinner!, Town Haul, Guess Who's Coming To Decorate, B. Smith Style, The Good Buy Girls, The Gastineau Girls, and Town Haul Jeffersonville.

True Entertainment was founded in 2000 by Steven Weinstock and Glenda Hersh, who both previously worked for The New York Times subsidiary NYT Television.

Original Media was an American production company founded in 2002 by Charlie Corwin and Clara Markowicz.

On September 30, 2003, Endemol announced the acquisition of a 51% stake in New York-based True Entertainment, with the acquired company continue to be managed by the founding partners, Glenda Hersh and Steven Weinstock.

In 2014, Glenda Hersh and business partner Steven Weinstock's True Entertainment took over Original Media.

In 2017, True Entertainment and sister company Original Media merged to form Truly Original.

=== 2014–present ===
In May 2014, Shine America's parent company Shine Group and its owner 21st Century Fox announced that they were in exclusive negotiations with Apollo Global Management who owns Dutch-based entertainment production and distribution company Endemol (who owns Endemol North America) and American production company CORE Media Group to merge Shine Group with Endemol and CORE Media Group into one joint-venture global production and distribution company.

In September 2014, Endemol USA announced that they had absorbed CORE Media Group's management operations into their operations, following Endemol's parent company Apollo Global Management announcing that they had proposed a joint venture with CORE Media Group and 21st Century Fox's Shine Group in May 2014.

In October 2014, Shine America's owner 21st Century Fox and Endemol North America's and CORE's owner Apollo Global Management announced that they had finalised a deal to merge Dutch-based entertainment production and distribution powerhouse Endemol with British entertainment production and distribution company Shine Group and American unscripted production company CORE Media Group to become one joint venture global production and distribution company.

Two weeks later in that same month after Shine America's owner 21st Century Fox and Endemol North America and CORE's Apollo had finalised a deal to launch a joint-venture company, it was announced that Cris Abrego and Charlie Corwin became co-chairpeople of the merged company's North American operations.

Endemol Shine America merged with Endemol USA to form Endemol Shine North America.

In January 2017, Endemol Shine North America merged its New York-based studios True Entertainment and Original Media to become one unscripted reality production label named Truly Original. It would be run by the co-founders of True Entertainment and co-CEOs of the former company and Original Media, Glenda Hersh and Steven Weinstock.

In June 2017, the company closed its digital studio Endemol Shine Beyond USA, in favor of having digital productions be developed within its existing studios instead.

In November 2017, Endemol Shine North America announced that it would merge Endemol Shine Latino with the Mexico City-based studio Boomdog to form Endemol Shine Boomdog. The merged studio would be led by Boomdog CEO Alejandro Rincon.

== Former subsidiaries ==
- Ardaban: On March 6, 2012, Shine America announced the launch of Ardaban, with appointment of former Notional Co-president Chachi Senior as Ardaban CEO. On September 6, 2012, Ardaban CEO Chachi Senior announced Cleve Keller as Chief Development Officer.
- Shine Hispanic & Latin America: On January 24, 2013, Shine Group announced Cristina Palacio was appointed as president of Shine Hispanic & Latin America.

== Programs ==
=== Current ===
- Big Brother (Co-produced by Fly on the Wall Entertainment)
- Extreme Makeover: Home Edition (Co-produced by Hello Sunshine and Walt Disney Television Alternative)
- La casa de los famosos
- LEGO Masters
- MasterChef (Co-produced by One Potato Two Potato)
- MasterChef Junior (Co-produced by One Potato Two Potato)
- The Wall (Co-produced by CORE Media Group)
- Mirror's Edge (In production or possibly cancelled, most recent source from 2016, under license by Electronic Arts and EA DICE)

=== Former ===
Year	Name of program	Network	Co-producers (if any)	Fate
2003	Coupling	NBC	BBC Worldwide Americas and NBC Universal Television	Cancelled after four episodes were broadcast.
2004	$25 Million Dollar Hoax	NBC		Run concluded
2004	The Biggest Loser	NBC	3Ball Productions, Eyeworks USA and Twenty Five Seven Entertainment	Run concluded in 2016.
2004	Blow Out	Bravo	Bravo Originals	Run concluded in 2006.
2004	Date My Mom	MTV	MTV Production Development	
2005	30 Days	FX	FX Productions	Cancelled following 3rd season in 2008.
2008	American Gladiators	NBC	MGM Television, which owns the format as successor to Samuel Goldwyn Television	Original plans for 3rd season in summer 2009 cancelled.
2019	The Masked Singer	FOX	Smart Dog Media	Production taken over by Fox Alternative Entertainment starting in the second season.
2023	Hot Wheels: Ultimate Challenge	NBC	Mattel Television and Workerbee TV	Canceled after one season.
2024	The Summit	CBS		Canceled after one season.

- Billion Dollar Buyer
- Do Not Disturb (Co-produced by Principato-Young Entertainment and 20th Century Fox Television)
- The Face
- Family Food Fight
- Gigantic (Co-produced by Pacific Bay Entertainment, Grady Twins Productions and TeenNick Originals)
- House of Boateng (Co-produced by Sundance Channel Original)
- Hunted
- Identity
- I'm Dying Up Here
- Kath & Kim
- Kingdom
- Kung Faux
- Little Britain USA (Co-produced by BBC Worldwide Americas and HBO Original Programming)
- Minuto Para Ganar
- My Problem with Women (Co-produced with Tennman)
- Nashville Star (Co-produced by 495 Productions and NBC Universal Television)
- The Office (Co-produced by Deedle-Dee Productions and Universal Television)
- Parental Control (Co-produced by MTV Production Development)
- Restaurant Startup
- Rhett and Link: Commercial Kings (Co-produced by AMC Networks)
- Riot
- Shear Genius
- Steve Harvey
- Tabatha Takes Over
- Top Gear USA (Seasons 1 and 2 only; co-produced by BBC Worldwide Americas and A&E Networks)
- The Tudors (Co-produced by Showtime, Working Title Television, Octagon Films and Canadian Broadcasting Corporation)
- Ugly Betty (Co-produced by Silent H Productions, Ventanarosa and ABC Studios)

==== Shine America ====
- Gracepoint
- Restaurant Startup
- Fake Off
- MasterChef (FOX)
- MasterChef Junior
- The Bridge
- The Biggest Loser
- One Born Every Minute
- Ugly Betty
- The Tudors
- Nashville Star
- The Buried Life
- Kath & Kim
- Commercial Kings
- American Gladiators
- Parental Control

== International distribution ==
- My Dad Is Better than Your Dad
- Are You Smarter than a 5th Grader?
- The Biggest Loser

== See also ==
- Shine Limited
- Endemol Shine Australia
- Endemol
