= Prank Encounters =

2019 American television series

- Genre: Candid camera
- Written by: Doug Perkins; David Storrs
- Directed by: Anthony Gonzales
- Presented by: Gaten Matarazzo
- Voices of: Peter Giles
- Country of origin: United States
- Original language: English
- No. of seasons: 2
- No. of episodes: 15

Production
- Executive producers: Kevin Healey; Howard T. Owens; Ben Silverman; Rob Hyde; Gaten Matarazzo
- Producers: Hilary Frimond; Tony Poon
- Editors: Akın Özçelik: Adam Varney; Ryan Wise; Matt Silfen
- Running time: 19–27 minutes
- Production company: Propagate

Original release
- Network: Netflix
- Release: October 25, 2019 – April 1, 2021

Prank Encounters is an American horror-themed comedy candid camera television series. It is a prank show recorded with hidden cameras. Each episode pairs two members of the public, strangers to one another, who are unwittingly introduced to each other by show actors, under the ruse of a tryout for a new job. Subsequently, a sequence of scares orchestrated by Gaten Matarazzo occur in order to scare the participants for comedic value, with Matarazzo adapting the prank via headsets fed to the actors on the fly.

The first 8-episode season debuted on October 25, 2019, on the streaming service Netflix. A second season was released on April 1, 2021, and consisted of 7 episodes.

== Cast ==
- Jack Crawford
- David Storrs
- Mary Gallagher
- Sven Holmberg
- Julian Gant
- Peter Giles
- Olivia DeLaurentis
- Gaten Matarazzo

== Episodes ==
Series overview
Season	Episodes	Originally released
1	8	October 25, 2019
2	7	April 1, 2021

=== Season 1 (2019) ===
No. overall	No. in season	Title	Original release date
1	1	"Teddy Scareee!"	October 25, 2019
One worker has a babysitting gig, while another stops by to collect toys for charity. But a certain evil teddy bear doesn't want to be collected.
2	2	"End of the Road"	October 25, 2019
Temps hired to investigate frequent accidents on an isolated stretch of road find themselves in an angry mama monster’s unhappy hunting ground.
3	3	"Face Fears"	October 25, 2019
One temp assists a patient in post-op recovery as another helps a sleuth find a missing woman. Cue a shocking reveal and an emergency call to nowhere.
4	4	"Urgent Scare"	October 25, 2019
When an ailing ex-astronaut checks into a night clinic, two women find themselves locked in a cosmic battle with a gruesome souvenir from space.
5	5	"Camp Scarecrow"	October 25, 2019
Two unsuspecting strangers try to rebrand a shuttered summer camp. But a crazed custodian and a homicidal scarecrow crash their brainstorming session.
6	6	"Storage War of the Worlds"	October 25, 2019
An electrical outage in a top-secret government warehouse triggers a shutdown and releases a hostile alien on the terrified staff. Don't zap him!
7	7	"Fright at the Museum"	October 25, 2019
An Egyptian sarcophagus arrives at the Gaten Museum. When an assistant decodes its hieroglyphics, an ancient curse activates -- and yikes, snakes!
8	8	"Split Party"	October 25, 2019
Gaten and his hired hands attend a young fan’s birthday party. But the good times go south when the host serves up his killer cake.

=== Season 2 (2021) ===
Due to the ongoing COVID-19 pandemic in the United States, this series was recorded with limited social distancing and was filmed during late 2020 and early 2021. The participants and actors were tested for COVID-19 before recording. The series was released on April Fool's Day, in respect of the show's theme of pranking.

No. overall	No. in season	Title	Original release date
9	1	"These Walls Can Talk"	April 1, 2021
Two unsuspecting women contend with creepy residents — both "passed" and present — while preparing a massive mansion to be sold.
10	2	"Missing Missing Link"	April 1, 2021
Good thing this dangerous prehistoric entity is kept securely frozen in cold storage. If it were to thaw, well, that would be bad. And cue the heat!
11	3	"Spider Mansion"	April 1, 2021
While working at a seemingly infested home, an exterminator's helper and a personal assistant develop a completely understandable fear of spiders.
12	4	"Mind Field"	April 1, 2021
Did this inventor really create a device that can read people's minds? Of course not, but don't tell these wide-eyed believers.
13	5	"Mist Demeanor"	April 1, 2021
A produce sorter and a PR assistant try to stay calm and survive what they think is a deadly fog from another dimension.
14	6	"Re-Face Fears"	April 1, 2021
In this continuation of a Season 1 episode, an insane surgeon is on the loose as two weary temps watch with dread.
15	7	"Graveyard Shift"	April 1, 2021
A dark and ominous night. An ancient burial ground. Rumors of mysterious beings. Yep, sounds like the perfect setup for a ghoulish prank.

== Release ==
Prank Encounters was released on October 25, 2019, on Netflix streaming.

== Reception ==
The show has received negative reviews. Some viewers of the show have accused the reactions to the pranks of being entirely staged.

The Daily Dot had unfavorably compared the series to Punk'd and criticized the reactions, stating "Netflix's Prank Encounters is a riff on Punk'd, but it doesn't do anything to set itself apart. [...] The reactions from the people getting pranked (who are not supposed to be actors) are so formal and stiff that it feels like watching bad improv."

=== Controversy ===
When the series was announced in June 2019, there was controversy regarding the premise of the show being disrespectful towards people in search of employment. A spokesperson for Netflix stated that individuals involved were financially compensated for their time and had fun being in the show. When the series launched later in October, the executive producer of the show, Kevin Healey, reassured to Entertainment Weekly that individuals pranked were aware the job they took was only for one night, and that they were indeed paid afterward. Matarazzo also responded to the initial controversy when the show was announced on his Instagram account. Matarazzo stated, "Thank you guys for your concern for these people. It means so much to me and the rest of the producers of the show. We hope you enjoy the show, and we are very excited to show you all what we've created [...]."

In March 2020, it was reported that Healey's former partner and Scare Tactics co-creator, Scott Hallock, filed a copyright lawsuit in federal court suing Healey for "blatantly ripping off storylines from the original", Scare Tactics. Hallock and his WMTI Productions, Inc. are the exclusive worldwide rights holders for the Scare Tactics franchise. The lawsuit was settled before trial.
