= City vs Country (game show) =

Finnish quiz show

- Genre: Game show
- Starring: Jaakko Saariluoma; Kalle Lamberg
- Country of origin: Finland
- Original language: Finnish
- No. of seasons: 7
- No. of episodes: 83

Production
- Executive producers: Olli Suominen; Tuomas Summanen
- Producer: Jasmine Patrakka
- Running time: 41 minutes
- Production company: Rabbit Films

Original release
- Network: MTV3
- Release: February 24, 2017 – present

City vs Country (Finnish: Stadi vs. Lande) is a Finnish primetime entertainment quiz show broadcast on MTV3. The show is hosted by two local hosts – one representing the city and the other one the countryside. The original Finnish format is hosted by two stand up talents Jaakko Saariluoma and Kalle Lamberg.

== Format ==
Teams are family members, friends, co-workers or neighbours, always either from a big city or the countryside.

In the original Finnish version, in the first rounds, the teams answer to regular questions, either with multiple choice or not. From the first rounds, two teams from each side advance to semifinals, or "Duels". Here, the team with most correct answers will go to the final. In the final, the winning team choose on presenting them in the round. Then contestants haves to answer to questions fast as possible. If the contestant gets four or more correct in 90 seconds, the team wins the home country travel. If contestant can answer to eight correct, wins the team a Europe-travel, and if the contestant answers all 12 correct, they win a holiday trip to somewhere around the world.

== List of Stadi vs. Lande episodes (series 1–5) ==
=== Series 1 ===
Episode	Air Date	Winning team	Winnings
1	24 February 2017	City	European Travel: Riga, Latvia
2	3 March 2017	City	Home Country Travel: Koli
3	10 March 2017	Country	European Travel: Zakynthos, Greece
4	17 March 2017	City	World Travel: Brazil–Argentina Tour
5	31 March 2017	Country	Home Country Travel: Koli
6	7 April 2017	Country	European Travel: Mallorca, Mediterranean Sea
7	14 April 2017	City	European Travel: Saaremaa, Estonia
8	21 April 2017	City	Home Country Travel: Koli
9	28 April 2017	Country	Home Country Travel: Turku
10	5 May 2017	City	World Travel: Ras Al Khaimah, United Arab Emirates

=== Series 2 ===
Episode	Air Date	Winning team	Winnings
1	7 February 2018	Country	European Travel: Split, Croatia
2	14 February 2018	Country	European Travel: Chania, Greece
3	21 February 2018	City	World Travel: Sri Lanka
4	28 February 2018	City	European Travel: Montenegro
5	7 March 2018	Country	European Travel: Mallorca, Mediterranean Sea
6	21 March 2018	City	European Travel: Santorini, Greece
7	28 March 2018	Country	World Travel: Jordan
8	4 April 2018	Country	Home Country Travel: Relaxing and Spa
9	11 April 2018	City	European Travel: Karpathos, Greece
10	18 April 2018	City	European Travel: Split, Croatia
11	25 April 2018	Country	World Travel: Abu Dhabi, United Arab Emirates
12	2 May 2018	City	Home Country Travel: Turku
13	9 May 2018	Country	European Travel: Split, Croatia

=== Series 3 ===
Episode	Air Date	Winning team	Winnings
1	25 January 2019	Country	Home Country Travel: Kuusamo
2	1 February 2019	Country	World Travel: Oman, Arabian Peninsula
3	8 February 2019	City	European Travel: Crete, Greece
4	15 February 2019	Country	Home Country Travel: Salla
5	22 February 2019	City	European Travel: Rhodes, Greece
6	28 February 2019	City	World Travel: Fuerteventura, Canary Islands
7	1 March 2019	Country	European Travel: Mallorca, Mediterranean Sea
8	7 March 2019	City	Home Country Travel: Tampere
9	8 March 2019	City	World Travel: Sri Lanka
10	14 March 2019	Country	Home Country Travel: Kuusamo
11	21 March 2019	City	European Travel: Alanya, Turkey
12	28 March 2019	Country	World Travel: Abu Dhabi, United Arab Emirates
13	4 April 2019	City	European Travel: Mallorca, Mediterranean Sea
14	11 April 2019	Country	European Travel: Parga, Greece

=== Series 4 ===
Episode	Air Date	Winning team	Winnings
1	26 February 2020	Country	European Travel: Makarska, Croatia
2	4 March 2020	City	European Travel: Durrës, Albania
3	18 March 2020	Country	World Travel: Fuerteventura, Canary Islands
4	1 April 2020	Country	Home Country Travel: Saimaa
5	8 April 2020	Country	European Travel: Platanias, Greece
6	15 April 2020	City	World Travel: Goa, India
7	22 April 2020	Country	European Travel: Makarska, Croatia
8	29 April 2020	Country	European Travel: Lefkas, Greece
9	6 May 2020	City	European Travel: Rhodes, Greece
10	13 May 2020	Country	World Travel: Dubai, United Arab Emirates
11	20 May 2020	Country	European Travel: Mallorca, Mediterranean Sea
12	27 May 2020	Country	Home Country Travel: Saimaa
13	3 June 2020	City	European Travel: Makarska, Croatia
14	10 June 2020	Country	World Travel: Doha, Qatar

=== Series 5 ===
Episode	Air Date	Winning team	Winnings
1	14 April 2021	City	European Travel: Barcelona, Spain
2	21 April 2021	Country	World Travel: Dubai, United Arab Emirates
3	28 April 2021	City	European Travel: Alanya, Turkey
4	5 May 2021	City	Home Country Travel: Saimaa
5	12 May 2021	City	No Prize (Note: The team got so few correct answers in the final round that they failed to win any first prize and went home empty-handed.)
6	19 May 2021	Country	European Travel: Mallorca, Mediterranean Sea
7	26 May 2021	City	European Travel: Lisbon, Portugal
8	2 June 2021	City	World Travel: Tenerife, Spain
9	9 June 2021	Country	Home Country Travel: Saimaa
10	16 June 2021	City	European Travel: London, United Kingdom
11	23 June 2021	City	European Travel: Alanya, Turkey
12	30 June 2021	City	Home Country Travel: Turku

== International versions ==
Country	Name	Hosts	Channel	Premiere date
Finland (original version)	Stadi vs. Lande	Jaakko Saariluoma; Kalle Lamberg	MTV3	February 24, 2017
Hungary	Város vs Vidék	Attila Till; Zsolt Gáspár	TV2	August 8, 2022
Lithuania	Miestas ar kaimas	Vitalijus Cololo; Gabrielė Martirosianaitė	TV3	2018
Ukraine	Місто і село	Андрій Черепущак (Галицька Діва); Катерина Олос	Новий Канал (Novyi Kanal)	2025

In November 2024, the owner of the format announced that more local versions of the show have been commissioned: for Poland, for Ukraine and for a new series in Lithuania.
