= Gone with the Wine =

Finnish television series

- Created by: Vertigo Production
- Starring: Jaakko Saariluoma (host)
- Country of origin: Finland
- No. of episodes: 8

Production
- Running time: Approx. 0:25 per episode

Original release
- Network: MTV3
- Release: 2006 – 2007

Gone with the Wine (Finnish: Viinin viemää) is a comedial lifestyle series produced by Vertigo Production in 2006. TV host, stand-up comedian and actor Jaakko Saariluoma visits some of the most famous wine regions and wine producers in France, Italy and Spain. The language of the TV series is Finnish, English and Spanish.

In addition, there is a book based on this series and the DVD box set published in 2006. The book was elected the Travel book of the year 2007 by Mondo Magazine.

== Episodes ==
=== Episode 1: Tuscany ===
In the first episode, Saariluoma visits the region of Tuscany in Italy, where he wants to find good Chianti red wine. Saariluoma meets the daughters of the Antinori noble family, Albiera and Alessia, who guide the man into the secrets of good wine and food. Saariluoma also decides to attend a cookery course.

=== Episode 2: Piedmont ===
Saariluoma visits the Piedmont region of Italy. Saariluoma meets a wine guru Angelo Gaja and Finnish Riikka Sukula who, together with her husband Jyrki Sukula, has acquired a winery in Piedmont. Saariluoma also goes hunting for truffles.

=== Episode 3: Veneto ===
Saariluoma visits the native region of the Soave white wine, Veneto in Northern Italy, situated in the middle of Lake Garda, Verona, Venice and the Alps. Saariluoma wants to find out how wines that suit his pocket and are reasonably priced yet good quality are made. He meets two of the new generation wine makers, Alberto Zenato and Carlotta Pasqua and learns how to prepare a delicious asparagus risotto.

=== Episode 4: Champagne and Sparkling Wines ===
Saariluoma visits the wine region of Champagne in Northern France. He wants to know what is so special about the bubbles of Champagne that only sparkling wine made there is allowed to be called champagne. Saariluoma also samples sparkling wine in Spain and Italy.

=== Episode 5: Alsace ===
Saariluoma visits Northern France and the wine region of Alsace, which is famous for its good white wines. He rents a bike and meanders in Alsace from one village to another and one winery to another, sampling excellent white wines.

=== Episode 6: Languedoc-Roussillon and Rhône ===
Saariluoma visits Southern France and the wine region of Languedoc-Roussillon, which is the world’s largest wine region. He meets Jacques and Francois Lurton. From Languedoc, Saariluoma travels to Rhône to find out how winegrowing is done on stony fields.

=== Episode 7: Barcelona and Catalania ===
Saariluoma visits Barcelona in Spain, the destination of food and wine fanatics’ pilgrimages. Saariluoma visits the Torres winery in the home region of Spain’s most famous wine, Sangre de Toro, in the wine region of Penedes.

=== Episode 8: Rioja and Basque country ===
Saariluoma visits San Sebastian and Rioja in Northern Spain. Saariluoma gets to know the tapas bars of San Sebastian and the wines of Rioja.

== Book ==
There is a book based on the series in Finnish, written by Master of Wine Tuomas Meriluoto, Saariluoma and Mikko Takala. The book is published by Teos Publishing.
