= Haunted (2018 TV series) =

American paranormal Pseudo-documentary series

- Genre: Horror; Reality
- Directed by: Jan Pavlacky
- Original language: English
- No. of seasons: 3
- No. of episodes: 18

Production
- Executive producers: Brett-Patrick Jenkins; Howard T. Owens; Jordan Roberts; Ben Silverman
- Running time: 19–34 minutes

Original release
- Network: Netflix
- Release: October 19, 2018 – May 14, 2021

Haunted is a paranormal pseudo-documentary developed by Propagate. The anthology series focuses on horror stories in which individuals or groups of people talk about their paranormal experience. The six-episode first season premiered on Netflix on October 19, 2018. Season 2 was released on Netflix on October 11, 2019. Season 3 was released on Netflix on May 14, 2021.

== Controversy ==
Since its premiere, the legitimacy of the events portrayed in the program have been accused by viewers as being either highly exaggerated or entirely fictional due to unexplained plot holes and extreme violent crimes with no corroborating evidence to back up their existence, such as news media coverage or statements from the police.

Many of the stories featured in the series also resemble popular horror films released prior to the alleged date on which the events occurred. Others describe scenarios that are medically implausible. In the first episode, the story teller describes being revived by a defibrillator after having been medically dead from dehydration and heat stroke. Episode 2, "The Slaughterhouse", features a woman recounting the story of her serial killer parents. However, despite many people searching for any reference, police report, or news story relating to these events, no evidence was found to support it, leading many to question the show's "true story" claims. It has a 2020 spin-off- Haunted: Latin America.

== Episodes ==
| Season | Episodes | Originally released |
|---|---|---|
| 1 | 6 | October 19, 2018 |
| 2 | 6 | October 11, 2019 |
| 3 | 6 | May 14, 2021 |

=== Season 1 (2018) ===
| No. overall | No. in season | Title | Length (minutes) | Original release date |
|---|---|---|---|---|
| 1 | 1 | "The Woman in White" | 24:00 | October 19, 2018 |
A boy moves to a new apartment with his family, where he begins being haunted by visions of a ghost woman hanging from his closet.
| 2 | 2 | "The Slaughterhouse" | 31:00 | October 19, 2018 |
Two sisters grow up terrified in a house of horrors, where their sadistic father does unimaginable things.
| 3 | 3 | "Demon in the Dark" | 24:00 | October 19, 2018 |
A young girl is sure dark evil lives in the basement of her grandmother, where a family member once practiced the occult.
| 4 | 4 | "Children of the Well" | 23:00 | October 19, 2018 |
An old well in a young boy's basement connects him to three dead children's spirits, who want him to go down and play.
| 5 | 5 | "Alien Infection" | 20:00 | October 19, 2018 |
A woman was haunted all her life by vivid flashbacks of dark medical procedures.
| 6 | 6 | "Stolen Gravestone" | 22:00 | October 19, 2018 |
A young girl inherits a tombstone of a protective turned possessive spirit, when she meets and marries her partner.

=== Season 2 (2019) ===
| No. overall | No. in season | Title | Length (minutes) | Original release date |
|---|---|---|---|---|
| 7 | 1 | "The Mimic" | 27:00 | October 11, 2019 |
A young woman living in an old house with a dark history, hears her roommate's voices when they're not there
| 8 | 2 | "Ward of Evil" | 26:00 | October 11, 2019 |
In an assisted living facility a nurse working with dementia patients experiences disturbing energy emitted from a resident.
| 9 | 3 | "Cult of Torture" | 29:00 | October 11, 2019 |
The experiences of horrible abuse from New Bethany Home for Boys gay conversion program are detailed by a scarred man.
| 10 | 4 | "Spirits from Below" | 25:00 | October 11, 2019 |
With their loved ones, siblings recount the traumatising events experienced when they lived in their family home years ago.
| 11 | 5 | "Demon of War" | 26:00 | October 11, 2019 |
In Afghanistan a glowing eyed demon confronts a U.S. Marine, who is unusually shaken.
| 12 | 6 | "Born Cursed" | 19:00 | October 11, 2019 |
A boy entered the world in special circumstances and is sure an evil figure, 'The Hangman', follows him and his family.

=== Season 3 (2021) ===
| No. overall | No. in season | Title | Length (minutes) | Original release date |
|---|---|---|---|---|
| 13 | 1 | "In The Pines" | 34:00 | May 14, 2021 |
Narrator: Hannah / Guests: Jesse (Hannah’s Friend), Arun (Hannah’s Friend), Keith (Hannah’s Friend), Sam (Hannah’s Friend) An elderly man plays his banjo on his cabin porch, singing “Where Did You Sleep Last Night?” by Lead Belly, while a young woman is chained in a small room with a hole in the floor. When she screams out, he pulls on her chain and continues to play over her whimpers of pain. When she yells to be released, he aggravatedly quits playing and goes inside to confront her with a hand axe. She cries and screams as he approaches... Hannah was born in Juneau, Alaska, and grew up in Montana in a Christian fundamentalist home. Her home life was very strict, with rigorous church goings and bible studies. Being isolated from town, she would be at home with her abusive mother. There were some instances of child abuse that Hannah reveals (being tied and gagged in the basement of their house for multiple hours after disobeying her mother and being slapped across the face with her purse in front of coworkers and friends as a teenager for smoking cigarettes and drinking beer). This abuse led to Hannah becoming emancipated and move in with her friend Jesse, a disabled vet. They developed a deep friendship, and it is through him that she met Drew and moved to his place in California to help work on his cannabis farm. She and Drew eventually developed romantic feelings and moved into Drew’s log cabin in Cobb Mountain. It was a very happy time in their life, but things quickly took a turn for the worse. The morning after moving in, Hannah is left alone for a few days while Drew goes to check on his farms, and begins working to settle in. While moving things around, she discovers there is a “dead space” behind a wall and approaches Drew about it upon his return. He agrees to open it up and they discover the room that used to be a shower that now has chains, razor blades all over it, and open hole (the room from before). They are both assaulted with a horrific stench while investigating and decide to go into the basement to find the source. What they discover is a path that has been dug out that leads to a room with remains of a mattress and a bucket located under the hole with some gelatinous “black matter” of blood/bodily fluids inside. The two immediately conclude that this was the place where a serial killer probably kept people/lived and would torture and kill them in the small room above. After opening the room, the energy in the home quickly changed. They would hear "Where Did You Sleep Last Night?" played as though on a stereo, but the couple didn't have one. Even after boarding the room back up, the music would play from seemingly nowhere and there would be moments of sharp pain and bleeding that would happen for no reason. At night, Hannah and Drew would awaken with cuts as though from a razor blade, though they had not felt anything while asleep, and the number of cuts would grow and grow with each passing night. Hannah was becoming spooked and spoke to Drew about moving, but his thought was that the energy that was harming them was angry and trapped there and the best thing he could do was reach out to it and help it to move on. They argued over it, and Hannah left him alone while he opened himself up to the evil that was plaguing them. She found him yelling about the “house being hungry”, “feed the house”, and the “house needs blood.” She tried to help him, but he ran out and got into his car and drove off. While speeding away, he got into a car accident and was killed on impact. Hannah called her friend, Jesse, and had him get her out of the house. To this day, Hannah continues to mourn Drew’s passing and even carries a vial of his ashes with her. She affirms that there is an evil in the house and it got what it wanted: blood.
| 14 | 2 | "Haunted by Henry" | 26:00 | May 14, 2021 |
Narrator: Wyatt / Guests: Jessica (Wyatt’s Sister), Max (Wyatt’s Friend), Cindy (Wyatt and Jessica’s Mother), Terry (Jessica’s Husband) A group of men are working in poor conditions in a mine when an explosion happens, killing all but one man. The lone survivor crawls for help and finds Mr. Croft, a distinguished gentleman, standing over him with a lit cigar hanging out of his mouth. The survivor pleads for help, but the man simply drops the cigar and walks away... Wyatt and his family begin describing the intense haunting they experienced from an 1800s gentleman (Mr. Henry Croft). Wyatt was born and raised in Crofton in British Columbia on Vancouver Island. It was a mining town named after its leader, Mr. Henry Croft. He owned the mining activities around town and was the boss who everyone listened to or else. There were no safety protocols at that time, which resulted in a lot of deaths. When Cindy had worked and saved up some money, she moved them into Henry Croft’s old estate. It was a big place (described as “almost a castle”) but had the appearance of a haunted home. Still, they moved in. That day, Wyatt described feeling “something off” and was scared by the human size dolls that were in the house. He was also alarmed to find a reddish, blood stain on the wall in the old woodshed on the property. Jessica refused to live in the house after hearing about and seeing the stain but was bribed with a kitten that was found under the house to stay. There was a constant smell of cigars in the rooms at the top of the house and a rocking chair that always seemed to have a presence in it. This set both children on edge. In the laundry room of the house, Jessica discovered pictures of deceased people in coffins and bottles and jars that contain embalming fluids that upset her further. One night, after moving in, Wyatt was awake late into the night and was startled by the sound of footsteps and a toy fire engine that would go off even after being turned off. He ran into Jessica’s room for safety, but both continued to hear the footsteps and were attacked as they lay under the covers of her bed. This was the first time they had seen the image of Mr. Croft, though they didn't know who it was. Things continued to escalate towards Wyatt. One night, he found his engine blaring loudly at the top of the stairs, and when he went to get it was pushed down the stairs by Mr. Croft’s spirit. Another night, Wyatt noticed the engine sounding off and driving around on its own. When it stopped, he tried to get out of bed but ended up stepping on several tackling hooks that embedded into his feet. He was rushed to the hospital to deal with it. This was clearly an attack from the spirit. Wyatt began pulling away from friends and family, and eventually decided to do some investigating on the house. He returned to the woodshed where there were boxes of papers and news articles. It was in one paper that he saw Henry Croft’s image and realized this was the spirit terrorizing him. He also saw an article that told of a man who had lived in the home previously who had committed suicide in the woodshed. It was his blood that had stained the wall and left the feeling of foreboding. Wyatt was certain that it was the same spirit attacking him that drove the man to kill himself. The last night the family was in the house, Cindy was at work and her two kids were at home with their friends, Max and Diane. While enjoying time together, the lights in the house began to flicker, the TV became static, and then furniture began falling all around them. The kids were able to run out of the house and down the street to Diane’s house for safety. They called Cindy, and she returned to the house to find the house in shambles. She knew what had happened and gathered her kids. The tragedy however didn't end there. Later that night, Diane was leaving her home with her parents and was killed in a horrific car accident. This brought a deep sense of guilt to the family as they questioned whether her being in the house had led to the girl’s death. Jessica was even further destroyed when the wreckage was parked outside her room when her stepfather came home for lunch after having cleaned the site. This was the final step that made the family decide to leave the house for good. Still, Wyatt is adamant that the fear that Henry Croft got from their pain was exactly what he wanted.
| 15 | 3 | "Gift of Evil" | 21:00 | May 14, 2021 |
Narrator: Emily / Guests: Julie (Emily’s Friend), Will (Emily’s Friend), Diamond (Emily’s Friend), River (Emily’s Friend) A young girl is playing with her music box out in the woods. As it plays Tchaikovsky’s “Swan Lake”, she hums along and twirls about. Then, a truck with two men in the back pulls up and they hop out. They pursue her through the woods as she runs with her music box. Eventually, they corner her, and we then see her body being tossed over the edge of a cliff into a ravine below. Her body sinks into the dark waters as the music slowly stops... Emily always grew up knowing she was adopted. Her parents had really wanted a child and chose her to be theirs. She was the socially awkward kid growing up, but her godmother and her had a very close relationship. On her 16th birthday, Emily received a music box with her name engraved upon it. Inside was a ballerina figure that danced to Tchaikovsky’s “Swan Lake” and a locket. This was such a special gift for Emily and her most prized possession. Shortly after getting the presents, Emily begins seeing the spirit of a young girl around the house. At times the music box would play out of nowhere, or she would hear the young girl humming the song. One instance, in the bathtub, the girl appeared humming the song and was being gentle with Emily before suddenly pushing her under the water to drown her. Emily tried telling her sister and mother about this but was met with skepticism from them both. Even while playing chess with her father, Emily saw the little girl on the ceiling, but he didn't see anything and dismissed her. Another encounter happened late at night while Emily was asleep. She awoke to severe pain on her shoulder and looked in the mirror to find bite marks on her. A while later, Emily meets Ernesto and the two start a relationship. When he asked her to move in with him and his daughter, Jacqueline, she agreed to and the spirit of the girl seemed to disappear. For 10 months there were no encounters with the girl until one day the music box was opened and began to play again. Ernesto, who had opened the box, was suddenly violently ill having been assaulted with the smell of rotting flesh. When Jacqueline picked up the box, Emily snatched it from her hands and yelled at her not to touch it again. Emily was left with no other choice but to tell Ernesto about the spirit, and things started getting worse. When the spirit eventually assaulted Jacqueline one night, Ernest blamed Emily for this and yelled at her to leave. This devastated Emily as she and Ernesto had been discussing marriage. So, Emily decided to take the music box, which was the source of the ghost girl’s power, to a medium to find out more. He was able to tell that the box had belonged to a young girl named “Emily” (the box was engraved for her) and that she had been murdered. The spirit expressed a desire to remain with the living Emily, but the living Emily decided to get rid of the girl by throwing her box into the same ravine that her body had been thrown into years ago.
| 16 | 4 | "The Witch Behind the Wall" | 23:00 | May 14, 2021 |
Sibling plagued by violent hauntings discover that the unfriendly old woman living next door has built an eerily accurate model of their house.
| 17 | 5 | "Demon Cat" | 24:00 | May 14, 2021 |
Inside a home filled with strange howls and hisses, a demonic creature that looks like a cat breeds horrifying memories.
| 18 | 6 | "Sins of My Father" | 24:00 | May 14, 2021 |
As a boy, he watched his father go down a path of insanity. Now, as an Ivy League student, a tortured young man is having similar thoughts.
