= 30 Days (TV series) =

American reality television show

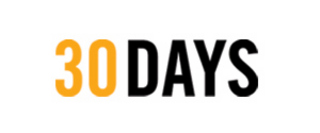
- Created by: Morgan Spurlock
- Starring: Morgan Spurlock
- Narrated by: Morgan Spurlock
- Opening theme: "The Passenger" by Iggy Pop
- Country of origin: United States
- Original language: English
- No. of seasons: 3
- No. of episodes: 18 (list of episodes)

Production
- Executive producers: John Landgraf; Ben Silverman; H.T. Owens; Morgan Spurlock; R. J. Cutler; Jonathan Chinn
- Producer: Sebastian Doggart
- Running time: 42–48 minutes
- Production companies: Actual Reality Pictures; Reveille Productions; Warrior Poets; 20th Century Fox Television (season 1)

Original release
- Network: FX
- Release: June 15, 2005 – July 8, 2008

30 Days is an American reality television series created and hosted by Morgan Spurlock for FX. In each episode, Spurlock, or some other person or group of people, spend 30 days immersing themselves in a particular lifestyle with which they are unfamiliar (e.g. working for minimum wage, being in prison, a Christian living as a Muslim, etc.), while discussing related social issues. As in Spurlock's film, Super Size Me, there are a number of rules unique to each situation which must be followed during each such experiment. At least one episode each season has featured Spurlock as the person spending the month in the particular lifestyle.

Season one premiered on June 15, 2005, and its respective DVD set was released July 11, 2006. The second season premiered on July 26, 2006. Season 3 of 30 Days premiered on June 3, 2008. Later that same year, FX said that it would not be renewing the series for a fourth season, effectively canceling the show. The show was later picked up for re-air by Destination America, though no new episodes were ordered.

In the United Kingdom, the program is broadcast on More4 and Channel 4. In Australia, the program is broadcast on Network Ten and Lifestyle Channel. It currently airs in Canada on Independent Film Channel and Canal Vie. It also airs on FX in Latin America. In Norway it airs on TV 2. In Sweden it airs on TV4 and Kanal 9.

== Episode listing ==
Season	Episodes	Season Premiere	Season Finale
1	6	June 15, 2005	July 20, 2005
2	6	July 26, 2006	August 30, 2006
3	6	June 3, 2008	July 8, 2008

=== Season 1: 2005 ===
#	Topic	Original airdate
101	"Minimum Wage"	June 15, 2005
30 Days premiered on June 15, 2005, with the pilot episode "Minimum Wage," in which Morgan Spurlock and his then fiancée, Alex Jamieson, lived for 30 days in the Bottoms neighborhood of Columbus, Ohio, trying to get by on minimum wage ($5.15 an hour). They had no access to prior cash, credit cards or health insurance and lived in an apartment whose rent was less than their combined wages for one week. Rules: 1. They have to work minimum-wage jobs.; 2. They must start off with only $206 (slightly less than one week's minimum wage pay).; 3. They must secure all their credit cards and other money, and are not allowed to access any savings accounts.
102	"Anti-Aging"	June 22, 2005
The second episode featured 34-year-old Scott Bridges on his quest to reverse the aging process using testosterone and growth hormone supplements. However, Bridges quits after 22 days on the program after experiencing abnormal liver functions and extreme decrease in sperm count (75M alive vs. 1M dead). Rules: 1. He must take daily injections of growth hormones and other medications.; 2. He must eat better and get exercise.; 3. He must get weekly checkups from his doctor.
103	"Muslims and America"	June 29, 2005
The third episode featured Dave Stacy, a devout Christian with seemingly offensive views of the Muslim people, who had to spend 30 days with a Muslim family. Rules: 1. Dave must act accordingly with all Muslim traditions, from what he wears to what he eats.; 2. Dave must study the Qur'an daily.; 3. Dave must grow a beard.
104	"Straight Man in a Gay World"	July 6, 2005
The fourth episode featured a conservative Christian man (under the idea that American way of life is under attack) who spends 30 days living with a homosexual man in his home in the Castro, a majority-gay neighborhood in San Francisco, California.: 1. He must familiarize himself with the city's gay culture by socializing with his roommate's friends.; 2. Get a job in the Castro.; 3. Meet with the reverend of the local "gay" church for a one-on-one conversation.
105	"Off the Grid"	July 13, 2005
Two nightclub employees with a dependence on the power grid have to live without electricity, phone service, or Internet; they have to spend 30 days at Dancing Rabbit Ecovillage in Rutledge, Missouri. Rules: 1. They must leave cars, electricity, and live completely off the grid.; 2. They must engage in manual labor.; 3. They must recycle everything, including their human waste products.
106	"Binge Drinking Mom"	July 20, 2005
In a Freaky Friday style of intervention of a daughter's future possibility of drinking, a mother begins to binge drink for 30 days as her daughter watches what a person would go through (e.g., vomiting, hangovers, and drunkenness). As the mother teaches the daughter, the mother ends up learning about the pressure teens experience to drink. Rules: 1. The mother must drink as much as a college student – at least four days a week.; 2. To count as "binge drinking," the mother must drink at least four drinks in two hours.; 3. She must go about her daily schedule as normal, despite sickness or hangovers.

=== Season 2: 2006 ===
#	Topic	Original airdate
201	"Immigration"	July 26, 2006
The second season begins with a reaction to recent immigration protests by placing a border-patrolling Minuteman – who, incidentally, had legally immigrated to the United States from Cuba as a child – in a home of illegal immigrants. Rules: 1. Leave any and all identification behind.; 2. Move in with a family of immigrants and live in their house.; 3. He will be put to work as a day laborer.
202	"Outsourcing"	August 2, 2006
The second episode of season 2 involves an unemployed computer programmer, Christopher Jobin, who had his job outsourced to India. He travels to India to work and find out why so many American jobs are being outsourced there. Rules: 1. Chris must relocate to India.; 2. Chris must live with a family that works in outsourced jobs.; 3. Chris must train and work in an outsourced job.
203	"Religious Perception (DVD Title: Atheist/Christian)"	August 9, 2006
A firm atheist must live among a family of devout Christians. Rules: 1. Must live with a family of devout Christians; 2. Must go to Church once a week 3. Must go to Bible Study once a week
204	"New Age"	August 16, 2006
A high-strung, stressed out salesman (Tom) is introduced to a New Age "life guide" who compels him to participate in a number of New Age ceremonies, treatments, discussions, etc., much to the chagrin of his live-in girlfriend. Rules: 1. Tom has to accept a life coach as his spiritual mentor and advisor.; 2. He must open his consciousness and release his body to new age healers.; 3. He must attend and participate in a variety of new age rituals.
205	"Abortion (DVD Title: Pro-Choice/Pro-Life)"	August 23, 2006
Twenty-nine-year-old Jennifer from Atlanta is a counselor at a reproductive health clinic who is strongly pro-choice, who had an abortion when she was younger. For 30 days she'll live in His Nesting Place, a residential Christian crisis pregnancy center in Long Beach, California run by former Operation Rescue activists. Rules: 1. Must move into a religious, pro-life crisis pregnancy center 2. Must obey house rules 3. Must participate in pro-life activities
206	"Jail"	August 30, 2006
Series creator Morgan Spurlock serves a mock thirty day sentence in the Henrico County Jail in Richmond, Virginia. However Spurlock is released after 25 days because in Virginia the average felon serves 85% of their sentence. Rules: 1. Must be treated exactly the same as all other inmates.; 2. Must spend 72 hours in solitary confinement.; 3. Limited to two visits only from friends or family outside. His first visit is from his mother and brother, and the second is from his fiancée, Alex.; At the end of the episode, it is revealed that two of the inmates Spurlock befriended (and were released during the 30 days) were re-incarcerated a few months later.

=== Season 3: 2008 ===
#	Topic	Original airdate
301	"Working in a Coal Mine"	June 3, 2008
Morgan Spurlock goes to West Virginia to work in a coal mine. He explores the detrimental effect burning coal has on the environment. Spurlock talks about the practice of surface mining, which is destroying the landscape in his native West Virginia. Rules: 1. He'd work regular shifts in a coal mine and face the same dangers as other coal miners.; 2. He would explore the impact of the coal industry on the environment.; 3. He would live with a family that's been in coal mining for generations.
302	"30 Days in a Wheelchair"	June 10, 2008
Cornerback for the Super Bowl winning Denver Broncos, Ray Crockett, spends 30 days in a wheelchair to simulate living with a spinal cord injury. He restructures his life to resemble that of a paraplegic. He has full movement of his arms. In the process he learns about disabled sports, the stigma associated with disabled people and the difficulties that they face. Rules: 1. He cannot move his legs, except for stretching exercises daily to avoid permanent side effects.; 2. He has to take part in a wheelchair rugby league.; 3. He has to tag along with patients at a local spinal cord rehabilitation program.
303	"Animal Rights"	June 17, 2008
An avid hunter lives in Los Angeles with a campaign coordinator for PETA, participating in PETA initiatives and working at an animal rescue center. Rules: 1. Must live with vegan family, and can't eat meat or wear animal skin.; 2. Must take a job in an animal rescue center.; 3. Must take part in animal rights demonstration.
304	"Same Sex Parenting"	June 24, 2008
A mother (who was adopted herself) opposed to gays and lesbians adopting has to live with two gay men and their adopted children. Rules: 1. Move in with the gay couple and their four adopted sons.; 2. Must get involved the gay community and attend same sex family events.; 3. Must work with gays and lesbians who are fighting for equal rights for their families.
305	"Gun Nation"	July 1, 2008
A gun-control supporter, who had a friend murdered by a shooting, moves in with a father and son who are strong gun advocates. Rules: 1. Move in with pro-gun family.; 2. Must work at a gun store and sell guns to people.; 3. Must get firearms training.
306	"Life on an Indian Reservation"	July 8, 2008
Morgan Spurlock spends 30 days on the Navajo Nation to study Native American life. Rules: 1. Move onto the reservation and live with a Navajo family.; 2. Learn some of the Navajo language.; 3. Take part in Navajo ceremonies.

== DVD releases ==
DVD name	Release date	# of eps	Additional information
Season 1	July 11, 2006	6	Commentary on selected episodes, and diary cam on all episodes.
Season 2	July 1, 2008	6	
Complete Boxset	May 18, 2010	18	
