= Massimiliano Bartoli =

Italian chef and restaurateur

- Born: Massimiliano Domino Bartoli; Bologna, Italy
- Other names: Max, Red
- Occupations: Chef, restaurateur
- Known for: The Restaurant

Massimiliano Bartoli, born in Bologna, Italy, is a chef and restaurateur. After arriving in Los Angeles at a very young age Bartoli worked with Fabrizio Tonucci at Tonno Ristoranti in 1996 along with Chef Paul Foster and Maitre d' Pablo Sorlino introducing the Nuova Cuccina Italiana in Beverly Hills.

Bartoli has worked at such restaurants as Rocco's on 22nd, the Miss Williamsburg Diner in Williamsburg, La Vineria in New York and the Houdini Kitchen Laboratory in Queens which he opened with partner Pilar Rigon in 2014.
