= Planet of the Apps =

Television show on Apple Music

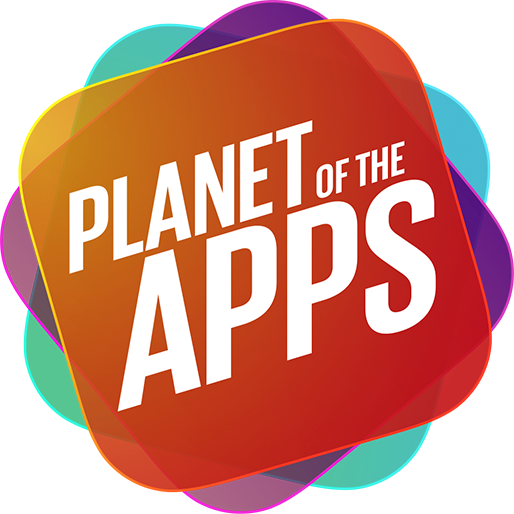
- Genre: Reality
- Created by: Howard Owens; Ben Silverman; will.i.am
- Directed by: Ryan Polito
- Presented by: Zane Lowe
- Starring: Jessica Alba; Gwyneth Paltrow; Gary Vaynerchuk; will.i.am
- Country of origin: United States
- Original language: English
- No. of seasons: 1
- No. of episodes: 10

Production
- Executive producers: Ben Silverman; Howard Owens; Michael Agbabian; Dwight D. Smith; Mary Celenza; Charles Wachter; will.i.am; Jessica Alba; Gwyneth Paltrow; Gary Vaynerchuk
- Camera setup: Multiple-camera
- Running time: 47–51 minutes
- Production companies: Propagate Content; Mission Control Media

Original release
- Network: Apple Music (archived on Apple TV+)
- Release: June 6 – August 14, 2017

Planet of the Apps is an American reality television show broadcast on Apple Music (predating the 2019 launch of Apple TV+). It was the first original television show produced by Apple. On July 23, 2018, it was announced that Apple had canceled the series after one season.

== Episode style ==
On each of the episodes, software makers have 60 seconds to pitch their idea in front of the advisors (Jessica Alba, Gwyneth Paltrow, will.i.am and Gary Vaynerchuk) on a slow-moving escalator—for a visual idea of an "elevator pitch". New episodes were released on Tuesdays, with the first season being 10 episodes long. The series is hosted by Zane Lowe and produced by Ben Silverman. The series premiered on June 6, 2017.

== Reception ==
The Guardian found the show "boring and self-indulgent," "painful," "a sort of vicarious embarrassment," and "grating."

== Season premiere ==
The premiere episode debuted the following apps:

- SILO – Focus and Study Timer
- Companion: Mobile Personal Safety
- Pair – Showroom to your home
- Dote – The Mobile Mall
- Tracks Battle Squad
- Twist – Live events with a dating Twist
- Skootch: The Word Game

== Episodes ==
No.	Title	Original release date
1	"Premiere"	June 5, 2017
2	"Flip the Script"	June 12, 2017
3	"Is It a Billion-Dollar Business?"	June 19, 2017
4	"Nothing But Hustle"	June 26, 2017
5	"My Greed Exceeds My Fear"	July 10, 2017
6	"Bet on the Jockey"	July 17, 2017
7	"Revolutionizing Social Media"	July 24, 2017
8	"Scar Tissue"	July 31, 2017
9	"Might As Well Go Big"	August 7, 2017
10	"These Guys Are Hustlers"	August 14, 2017
