= Haunted: Latin America =

- Genre: reality show
- Country of origin: Mexico
- Original language: Spanish
- No. of seasons: 1
- No. of episodes: 5

Production
- Running time: 26–47 minutes

Original release
- Network: Netflix
- Release: 31 March 2021

Haunted: Latin America is a 2021 reality television series. It is a spinoff of the Haunted (2018) series.

== Cast ==
- Laura Tovar
- Pablo Cesar Sanchez
- Pablo Guisa Koestinger
- Alejandro Restrepo

== Episodes ==
| No. | Title | Directed by | Written by | Original release date |
|---|---|---|---|---|
| 1 | "The House of the Damned" | Adrian Garcia Bogliano | Ramiro García Bogliano | March 31, 2021 |
| 2 | "The Cursed Doll" | Adrian Garcia Bogliano | Ramiro García Bogliano | March 31, 2021 |
| 3 | "The Woman from El Molino" | Adrian Garcia Bogliano | Ramiro García Bogliano | March 31, 2021 |
| 4 | "Something's Knocking at the Door" | Adrian Garcia Bogliano | Ramiro García Bogliano | March 31, 2021 |
| 5 | "The Devil Dances before Easter" | Adrian Garcia Bogliano | Ramiro García Bogliano | March 31, 2021 |
