= Jaakko Saariluoma =

Finnish actor, writer, director, and television presenter

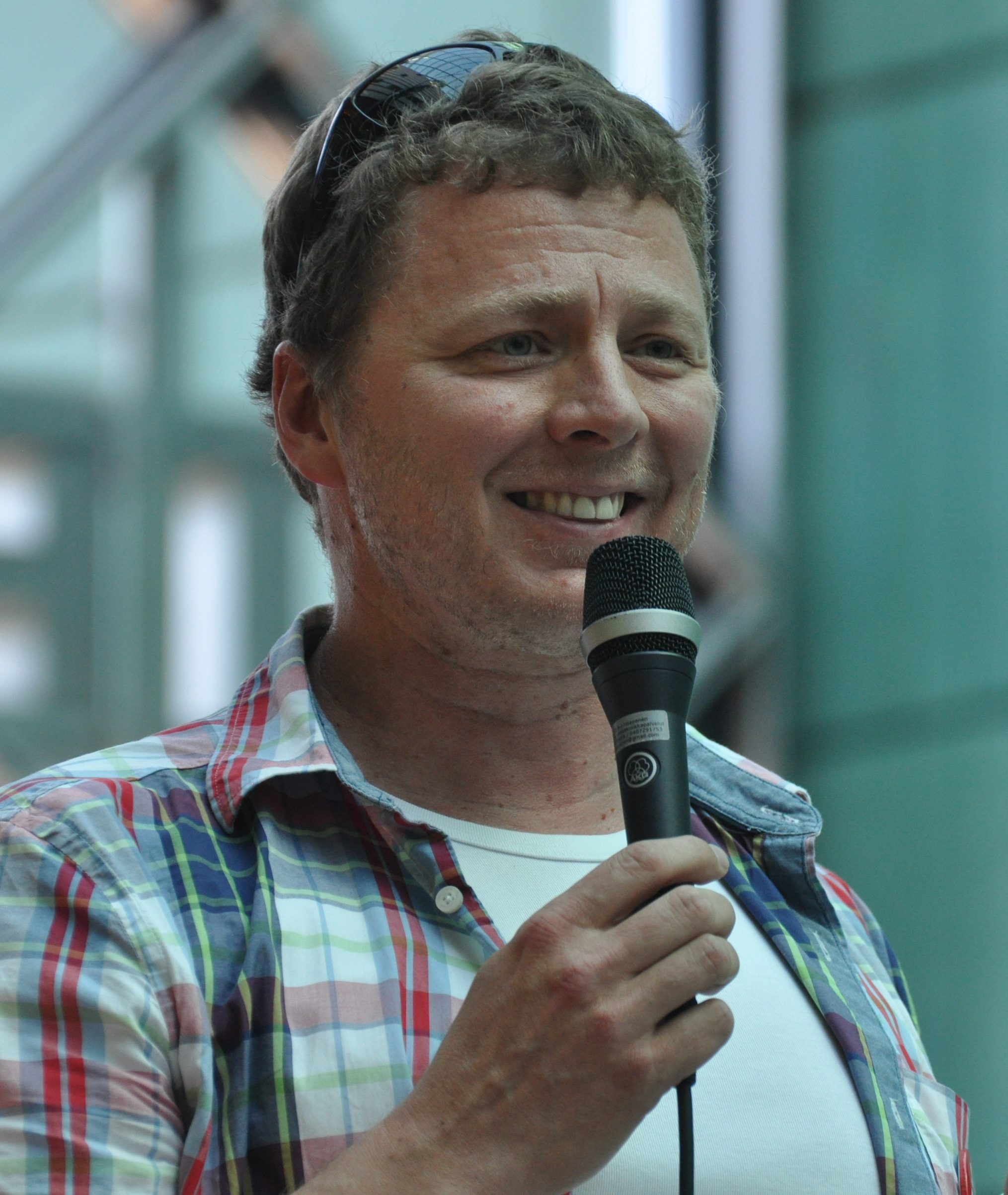
Saariluoma in 2014

Eino Jaakko "Jaska" Saariluoma (born 25 July 1967) is a Finnish actor, writer, director, stand-up comedian and television host.

== Education and career ==
Saariluoma graduated from Theatre Academy Helsinki in 1994, and has worked for several theatres, on television and in films. He is best known as a host of television programs such as Huuma and Putous.

== Selected filmography ==
=== Film ===
- Ihmiselon ihanuus ja kurjuus (1988)
- Akvaariorakkaus (1992)
- Sairaan kaunis maailma (1997)
- Uuno Turhapuro – This Is My Life (2004)
- Risto (2011)

=== Television ===
- W-tyyli (2004)
- Huuma (2005–2007)
- Viinin viemää (2006–2007)
- Tuntemattomat (2008)
- Putous (2010–2014)
- Tauno Tukevan sota (2010)
- Paparazzit (2012)
- Kingi (2015)
- Bordertown (2016)
- City vs Country (game show) (2017–present)
- Suurmestari (2020–present)
