= Kath & Kim (American TV series) =

American television sitcom

- Genre: Sitcom
- Based on: Kath & Kim by: Gina Riley; Jane Turner
- Developed by: Michelle Nader
- Starring: Molly Shannon; Selma Blair; John Michael Higgins; Mikey Day
- Opening theme: "Filthy/Gorgeous" by Scissor Sisters
- Composers: Adam Cohen; John Robert Wood
- Country of origin: United States
- Original language: English
- No. of seasons: 1
- No. of episodes: 17

Production
- Executive producers: Gina Riley; Jane Turner; Rick McKenna; Ben Silverman; Michelle Nader; Todd Cohen; Howard T. Owens; Teri Weinberg
- Producers: Jason Ensler; Wil Calhoun; Liz Astrof; Dana Klein; Patrick Keinlen
- Camera setup: Single-camera
- Running time: 30 minutes
- Production companies: Shaky Gun Productions; Reveille Productions; Universal Media Studios

Original release
- Network: NBC
- Release: October 9, 2008 – March 12, 2009

Kath & Kim is an American television sitcom adapted from the Australian television series of the same name created by Jane Turner and Gina Riley and well-supported by Magda Szubanski, with their titular roles being portrayed in this series by Molly Shannon and Selma Blair. The series premiered on NBC on October 9, 2008. Turner and Riley served as executive producers and consultants on this version, which was co-produced through Reveille Productions and Universal Media Studios.

The first episode premiered in Australia on October 12, 2008, on the Seven Network. The show's Australian broadcast was cancelled after the second episode the following week. The series was then pushed to a "graveyard" slot of 11 pm on Mondays and then pre-empted for the 2009 Australian Open after the first-run airing of episode 9, "Friends". Although the show initially gained modest ratings and mixed reviews from critics, NBC picked up Kath & Kim for a full season order of 22 episodes on October 31, 2008. On January 15, 2009, NBC cut the episode order from 22 to 17 episodes. The series finale aired on March 12, 2009.

On May 19, 2009, NBC cancelled the series after one season.

== Cast and characters ==
=== Main ===
- Molly Shannon as Kathleen "Kath" Day
- Selma Blair as Kimberly Crystal "Kim" Day Baker
- John Michael Higgins as Phillip "Phil" Lesley Knight
- Mikey Day as Craig Baker

=== Recurring ===
- Justina Machado as Angel
- Melissa Rauch as Tina

== Production ==
Prior to being adapted to an American version, the first two seasons of the original version aired in the United States on Trio in 2004. After Trio folded it moved over to the Sundance Channel in early 2006.

On November 9, 2006, NBC announced an American version of Kath & Kim. A pilot episode was produced by Reveille (the same studio that adapted Ugly Betty and The Office into American hits) and NBC Universal, with Riley and Turner serving as executive producers and consultants. Paul Feig was picked to direct the pilot episode.

Originally, NBC wanted the series to air in the 2007–2008 fall television season, but decided against it. The series was greenlit after the network named Reveille founder Ben Silverman its new entertainment head. Silverman had been trying to bring this adaptation to American screens since 2004. The show was ordered to series in early 2008. The series aired in Australia on Channel 7 in mid-2008, but only aired the pilot and first episode until it was taken off and replaced by repeats of the original series due to popular demand. The full series was later aired in Australia.

=== Casting ===
Molly Shannon was cast as Kath, and Selma Blair as Kim. Even though they are playing mother and daughter, Shannon is actually only seven years older than Blair: Shannon was born on September 16, 1964, and Blair was born on June 23, 1972. Similarly, in the Australian version, Jane Turner (Kath) is only six months older than Gina Riley (Kim).

Several names have been changed for the US version. While Kath has retained her full name from the Australian series (in which she was known as Kath Day until her marriage to Kel at the end of Season 1) and Kim has retained her first name, Kim is known as Kim Day (rather than Kim Craig née Day) although in one episode Kath calls her by her full name in which Kim's original middle name of Diane was replaced with Crystal. The two other characters have different first names: Craig Baker (replacing Brett Craig) and Phil Knight (replacing Kel Knight), while the character of Sharon is entirely absent from the series, as Magda Szubanski objected to the casting.

Maya Rudolph made the show's first guest appearance as Athena Scooberman in episode 8, "Sacrifice". Pamela Anderson made the show's second guest appearance in episode 9, "Friends".

=== Location settings ===
Originally, the series setting was supposed to be set in Fountain Valley, a fictional suburb of Phoenix, Arizona. There were suggestions of using the San Fernando Valley portion of Los Angeles, California, as the setting, after they started shooting episodes on June 13, 2008, in Los Angeles' West Hills neighborhood. Throughout the series there were references to the geographical setting as Central Florida; characters sometimes referenced short, sunny, afternoon rain downpours as are typical of Central Florida's climate.

== Episodes ==
No.	Title	Directed by	Written by	Original release date	Prod. code	Viewers (millions)
1	"Pilot" "Love"	Jason Ensler	Gina Riley & Jane Turner (Australian episode: "Sex"); Michelle Nader (teleplay)	October 9, 2008	KK-101	7.5
In the series opener, mother Kath has finally found love in the form of a sandwich shop owner named Phil Knight, while daughter Kim is now newly separated from her husband of six weeks, Craig. When Kim decides to move back home, she starts putting a damper on Kath's new romance, and learns that her former room has just been remodeled.
2	"Respect"	Jason Ensler	Liz Astrof	October 16, 2008	KK-104	6.01
Kath wants to put her home salon business on the map, and Phil helps her do so by getting her a booth at a local mall event. Meanwhile, Kim gets Craig fired from his job, forcing him to work at a less desirable cinnamon bun shop. After another argument, Craig leaves to attempt to get his old job back, and Kim gets banned from the mall.
3	"Old"	Jason Ensler	Gina Riley & Jane Turner (Australian episode: "Old"); Michelle Nader (teleplay)	October 23, 2008	KK-102	4.97
Kath is excited about planning her flamboyant wedding to Phil, but is later made insecure by Kim's remarks about how she might be too old for a big wedding. Meanwhile, Kim must deal with insecurities of her own when she begins to think that her husband might be having an affair.
4	"Money"	Jason Ensler	Gina Riley & Jane Turner (Australian episode: "Money"); Wil Calhoun (teleplay)	October 30, 2008	KK-106	5.46
Phil creates a new sandwich at work, naming it after Kath and himself, but his marketing does not lead to a popular sandwich. Kim decides she wants to get back together with Craig when she learns that breeding his dog can produce large amounts of cash. These plans come under fire when her friend, who is trying to get in the good graces of a man working at the pound, brings over a small group of dogs when Craig's dog is in heat. Meanwhile, Kath finds that her plans for a flamboyant wedding are more expensive than she had thought. Kath has her eyes on an expensive 'pumpkin' carriage, but despite working overtime in her salon, she cannot earn the money needed to reserve the carriage. Phil on the other hand has been left at the altar more than once, and is reluctant to have a large wedding after the experiences. When Phil learns through Kim that Kath cannot afford her dream wedding, he arrives with the carriage, wearing a fairy tale styled tuxedo. The two profess that they want the kind of wedding the other one wants. Kim seems actually impressed by this, despite her dislike for Phil.
5	"Dating"	Jason Winer	Wil Calhoun & Liz Astrof	November 6, 2008	KK-105	5.57
Kath grows paranoid when she thinks that Phil is keeping secrets from her. Meanwhile, Kim decides that she will not get back together with Craig until he gets rid of his dog. To teach him a lesson, Kim joins her friend Tina in speed dating.
6	"Jealousy"	Roger Kumble	Gina Riley & Jane Turner (Australian episode: "Shower"); Jessica Steinbaum Lopez (teleplay)	November 13, 2008	KK-107	5.08
Kath feels jealous when Phil's best friend Sandy visits. Meanwhile, Craig begins to stand up to Kim and her endless requests.
7	"Gay"	Jason Ensler	Gina Riley & Jane Turner (Australian episode: "Gay"); Wil Calhoun (teleplay)	November 20, 2008	KK-109	5.47
Kath encounters a gay couple while shopping for her wedding; Kim's friendship with a former classmate piques Kath's curiosity; and Phil struggles with insecurity.
8	"Sacrifice"	Randall Einhorn	Dana Klein	December 4, 2008	KK-110	4.88
The stress from wedding planning is taking its toll on Kath and giving her insomnia. Phil suggests that Kath visit his life coach and spiritual advisor Athena Scooberman (Maya Rudolph). Kath agrees and is quickly taken with Athena and her teachings, but Phil soon realizes that his advice may have been a big mistake. Meanwhile, Kim must pay her outstanding parking tickets in order to get a boot removed from her car. Instead of paying the price, she asks Craig to help her get out of the bind no matter the cost.
9	"Friends"	Danny Leiner	Liz Astrof	December 11, 2008	KK-111	5.33
Kath and Phil invite the security guard from the mall and his wife to a Christmas party in an attempt to develop more "couple" friends. Meanwhile, Craig and Kim are having trouble holding on to a friend. Pamela Anderson makes the show's first star guest appearance during "Wine Time."
10	"Florida"	Roger Kumble	Liz Astrof	January 8, 2009	KK-108	4.14
After one of Kath's salon clients dies unexpectedly, Phil takes it upon himself to save one of his own customers from an untimely death by introducing him to a healthier lifestyle. Craig goes on a shopping spree with the money expected from his dog's soon-to-be-born purebred puppies, but Kim does not have the heart to tell him that the puppies may be mutts and that he is spending money that he does not have.
11	"News"	Jason Ensler	Wil Calhoun	January 22, 2009	KK-112	4.89
Kim decides to pursue a career as a news anchor for a local TV station. Craig has a mishap with Phil's car, which only gets worse when the police get involved.
12	"Idols"	Robert Berlinger	Adam Barr	February 5, 2009	KK-114	4.72
Kath and Kim are in the running to host a dinner for Wynonna Judd, but first they have to be interviewed by Wynonna's people; Craig tries to write a hit country song with his friend Derrick (Jay Phillips).
13	"Celebrity"	Phil Traill	Wil Calhoun	February 12, 2009	KK-113	5.48
Kath asks Athena (Maya Rudolph) for spiritual guidance before auditioning for a community production of "Cats"; Kim gets a job at Phil's sandwich shop.
14	"Competition"	Randall Einhorn	Jane Turner & Gina Riley (Australian episode: "Cactus Hour"); Jim Dubensky & Steve Gabriel (teleplay)	February 19, 2009	KK-115	5.13
Kath searches for her ex, Rusty, after discovering they are still married; Kim falls in love with roller derby.
15	"Desire"	Gail Mancuso	Gina Riley & Jane Turner (Australian episode: "Money"); Michelle Nader (teleplay)	February 26, 2009	KK-103	3.44
Kim embarks on a new business venture, but finds her plans hampered when Craig refuses to provide the funding. Also, Phil and Kath plan a romantic evening, but those plans are also quickly spoiled.
16	"Bachelorette"	Ken Whittingham	Gina Riley & Jane Turner (Australian episode: "Party"); Liz Astrof & Dana Klein (teleplay)	March 5, 2009	KK-116	4.16
Phil and Kath get ready for their bachelor parties; Craig and Derrick hire a stripper for Phil's party.
17	"Home"	Randall Einhorn	Wil Calhoun & Michelle Nader	March 12, 2009	KK-117	4.00
Kath asks Phil to move in with her, Kim gets upset when Craig doesn't remember their second date anniversary.

== Reception ==
=== Critical response ===
The show received negative criticism from viewers and television critics, especially in the casting, adjusting of the tone of the show and even the show's costume design, which has led to Blair firing back over the claims that it ruins the creativity of the original. Early reviews of the pilot were poor, with the San Francisco Chronicle calling it "a contender for worst remake ever".

=== Ratings ===
Despite negative reviews, the series debut's ratings were strong. The show finished third overall with a total of 7.5 million viewers. In the 18- to 49- and 18- to 34-year-old demographics it placed second and first respectively. By its third episode, viewers had dropped to 4.99 million viewers, two thirds of the viewers from the pilot.

Episode	Viewers (in millions)	Household rating/ Share
"Love"	7.46	4.9/7
"Respect"	6.01	TBA
"Old"	4.98	TBA
"Money"	5.46	TBA
"Dating"	5.57	TBA
"Jealousy"	5.08	TBA
"Gay"	5.47	TBA
"Sacrifice"	4.88	TBA
"Friends"	5.33	TBA
