= Gaten Matarazzo =

American actor (born 2002)

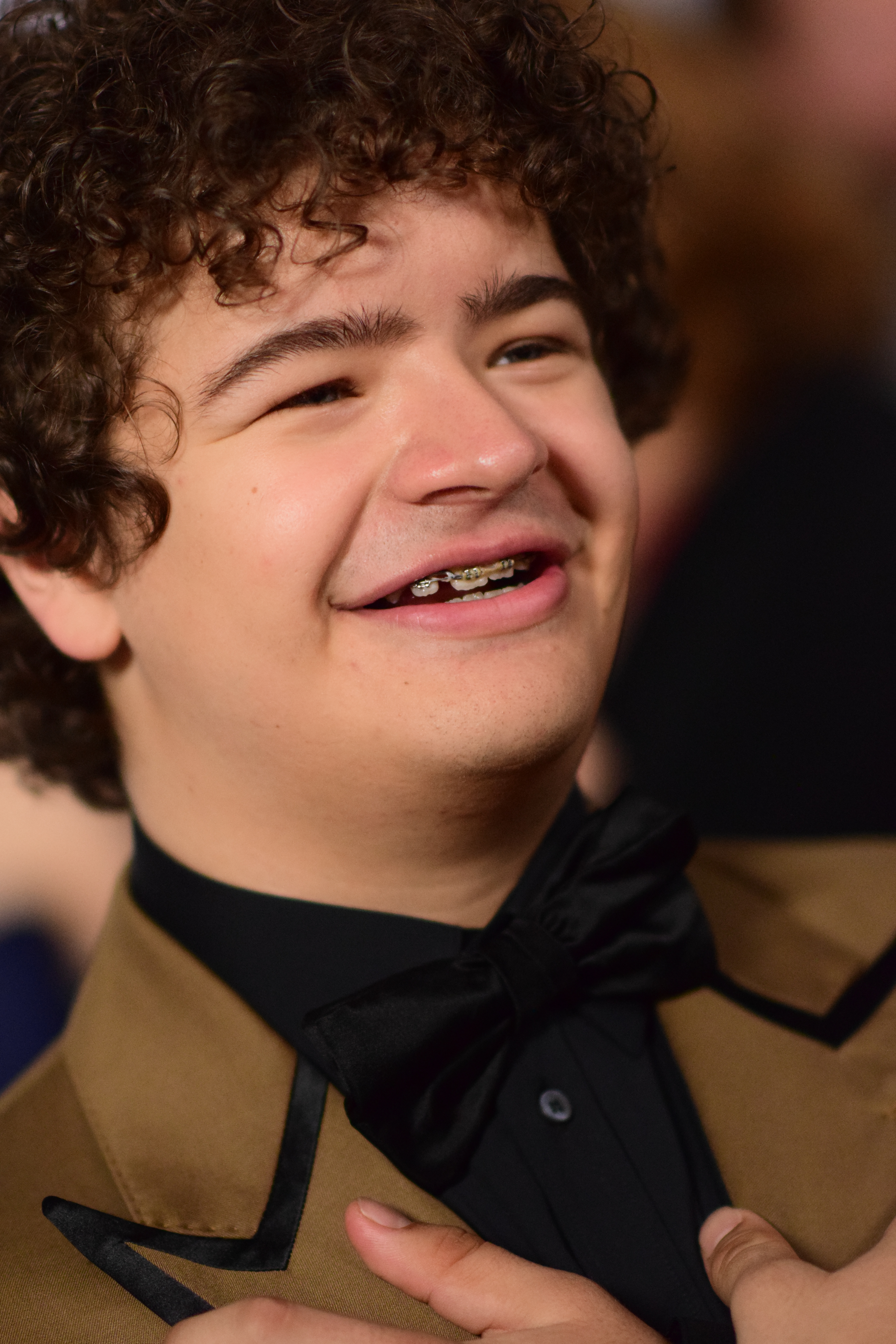
- Matarazzo in 2022
- Born: Gaetano John Matarazzo III; September 8, 2002 (age 24); New London, Connecticut, U.S.
- Occupation: Actor
- Years active: 2011–present
- Partner: Elizabeth Yu (2018–present)

Gaetano John "Gaten" Matarazzo III (/ˈɡeɪtən ˌmætəˈræzoʊ/ GAY-tən MAT-ə-RAZ-oh, Italian: [ɡaeˈtaːno mataˈrattso]; born September 8, 2002) is an American actor. He began his career on the Broadway stage as Benjamin in Priscilla, Queen of the Desert (2011–12), followed by Gavroche in Les Misérables (2014–15). Matarazzo gained international recognition for playing Dustin Henderson in the Netflix science-fiction-horror drama series Stranger Things (2016–2025). He also hosted the Netflix show Prank Encounters (2019–2021). In 2022, he co-starred in the coming-of-age comedy film Honor Society and voiced Boris the Dragon on the animated fantasy comedy film My Father's Dragon. In 2025, he starred in the animated film Animal Farm, in which he voiced the character Lucky. In 2026, he starred in and was the executive producer for the stoner comedy Pizza Movie.

== Early life ==
Gaetano John Matarazzo III was born on September 8, 2002, in New London, Connecticut, to Heather and Gaetano John Matarazzo Jr., and was raised in Little Egg Harbor Township, New Jersey. His grandfather is of Italian descent from Avellino. Matarazzo was born with cleidocranial dysplasia (CCD). He has an older sister, Sabrina, and a younger brother, Carmen.

Matarazzo pursued vocal training at Starlight Performing Arts Center in New Jersey. In 2011, he competed and won third place with his vocal solo titled "Ben" at the Starpower Talent Competition Nationals in Uncasville, Connecticut. He graduated from Pinelands Regional High School in 2020.

== Career ==
=== Theatre ===
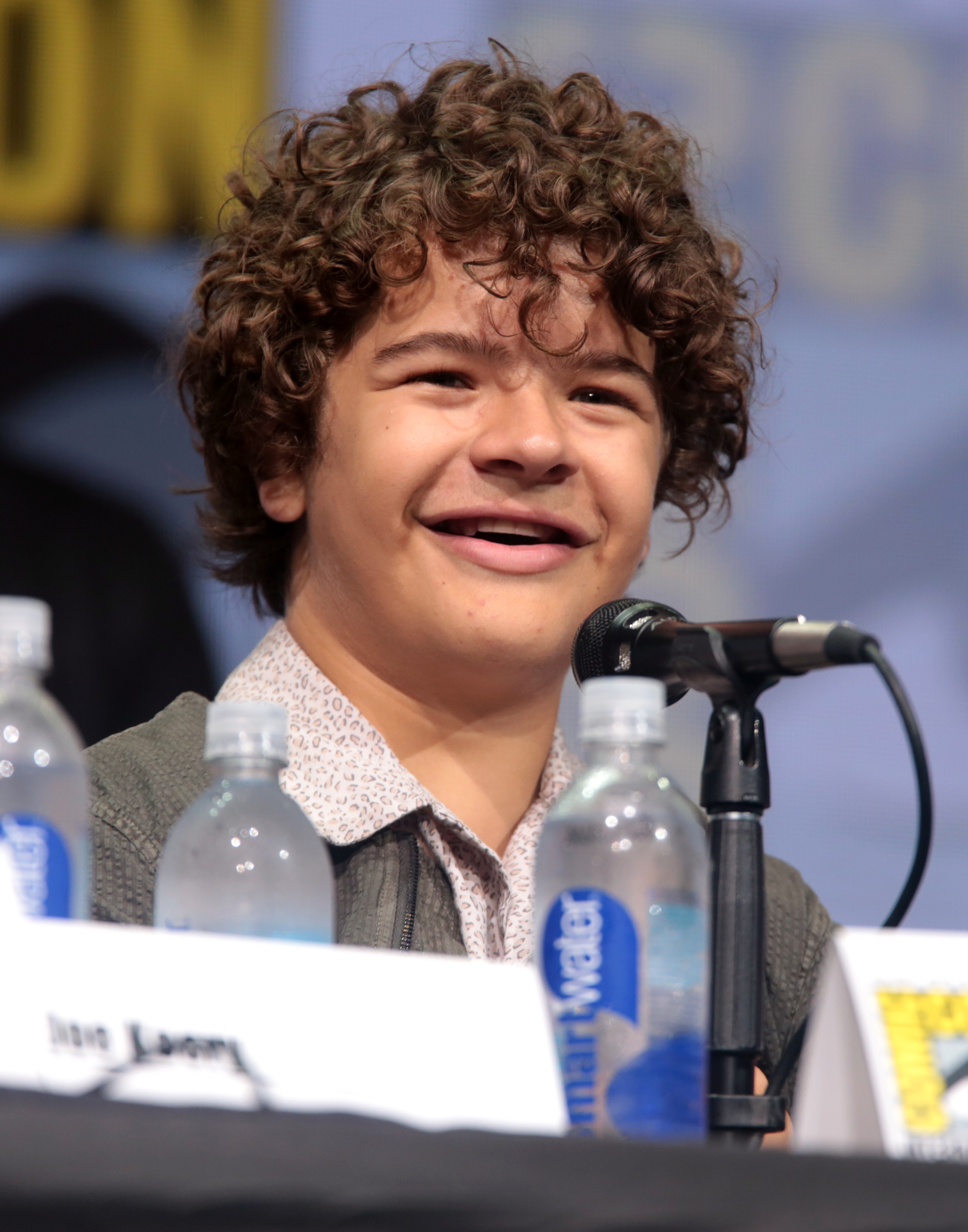
Matarazzo at San Diego Comic Con in 2017

Matarazzo‘s first professional credit was in the Broadway musical Priscilla, Queen of the Desert, for which he was cast as a replacement in 2011. Following the production, he took part in a special "Cast of 2032" professional youth performance of Godspell at Circle in the Square Theatre in 2012. In 2013, he joined the Les Misérables 25th Anniversary Tour in the United States in the role of Gavroche; the following year, he played the same role in the Tony-nominated 2014 Broadway revival of the musical.

In May 2022, it was announced that Matarazzo would return to Broadway, joining the final cast of the musical Dear Evan Hansen as Jared Kleinman. He starred in the Paramount+ film Honor Society with Angourie Rice, which was released on July 29, 2022. He voiced Boris the dragon in Cartoon Saloon's film adaptation of Ruth Stiles Gannett's My Father's Dragon novel series. It was announced in December 2022 that Matarazzo would be returning to Broadway as Toby Ragg in Thomas Kail's revival of Sondheim and Wheeler's Sweeney Todd, alongside Josh Groban, Annaleigh Ashford and Jordan Fisher.

On October 8, 2026, Matarazzo began starring as the character Mark Cohen in a revival of RENT showcased at the Tom Stoppard Theatre in London's West End. The show is set to run until March 27, 2027.

=== Television ===
Matarazzo made his screen acting debut in a 2015 episode of The Blacklist. After he was cast as Dustin Henderson in Stranger Things, the character's background was modified to have CCD as well. The show's first season premiered in July 2016 to critical acclaim. Matarazzo initially auditioned for the role of Mike Wheeler, another key character in the series, but was instead cast as Dustin Henderson. Over the next several years, Matarazzo also appeared in music videos and various reality and competition shows. On May 11, 2018, it was announced that he was cast in the animated film Hump.

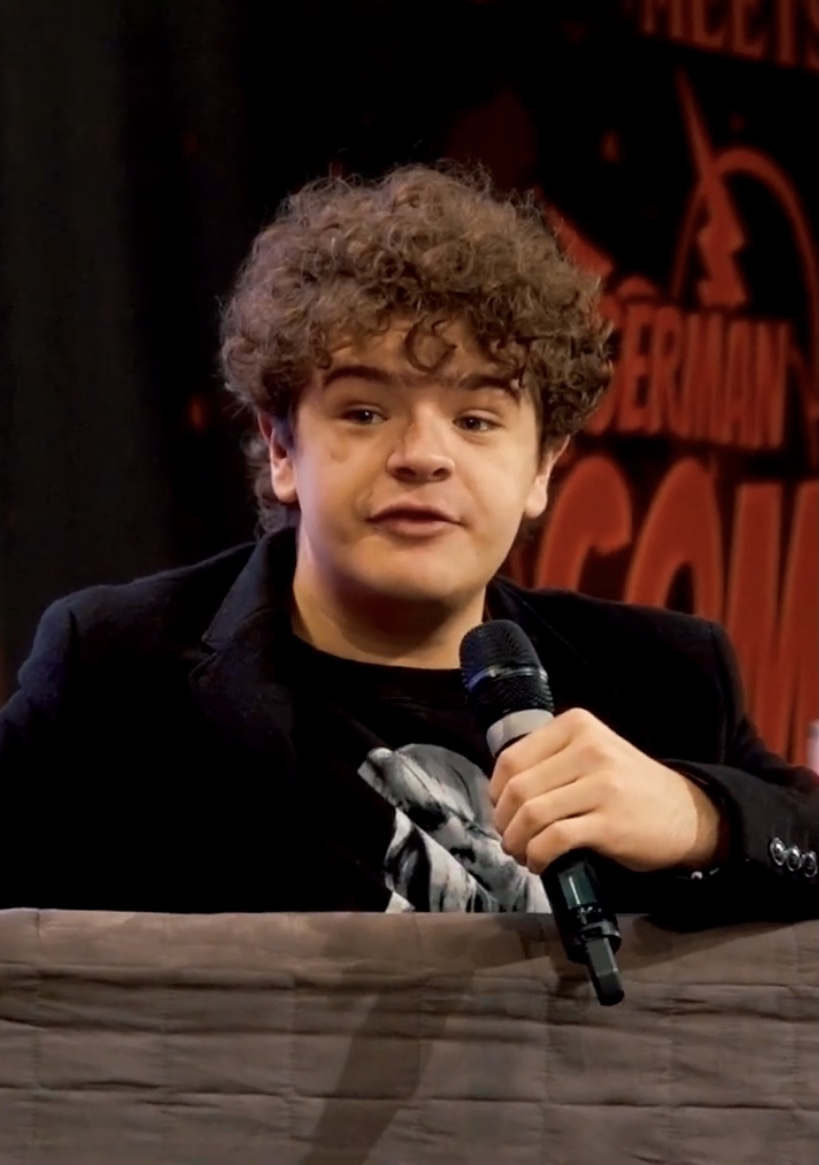
Matarazzo at the German Comic Con in December 2022

=== Film ===
In June 2025, Matarazzo joined the cast of BriTANIcK’s stoner-comedy Pizza Movie that premiered on Hulu on April 3, 2026. He was also credited as the executive producer on the film.

=== Others ===
Matarazzo began hosting the Netflix hidden camera series Prank Encounters in 2019; he also served as an executive producer. That year, he also appeared in the Hollywood Bowl production of Into the Woods. He provided the voice of Bubba in The Angry Birds Movie 2. He stars opposite Alan Cumming, Bebe Neuwirth, Barrett Leddy, and a full cast in the Audible Original Underdogs: A Musical, released March 2026.

== Philanthropy ==
He uses his platform to raise awareness of cleidocranial dysplasia (CCD) and fundraise for CCD Smiles, an organization that helps cover costs of oral surgeries for people with CCD.

In February 2020, he was as part of Andrew Barth Feldman and Adrian Dickson's Star Wars musical parody fundraiser SW: A New(sical) Hope to help raise funding for NEXT for AUTISM. Matarazzo joined the cast of Elf for a virtual table reading on December 13, 2020, in support of the Democratic Party of Georgia's campaign in the 2021 Georgia runoff elections.

On April 6, 2021, Matarazzo participated in an hour-long charity Among Us stream on The Tonight Show's Twitch account with Jimmy Fallon, Questlove, Tariq Trotter, Captain Kirk Douglas, Sykkuno, Valkyrae, Corpse Husband, and his Stranger Things co-star Noah Schnapp, with proceeds going towards Feeding America. In December 2021, he played Dungeons and Dragons with Jack Black and other stars in the Lost Odyssey: Promised Gold livestream event that benefited Extra Life and the Children's Miracle Network Hospitals.

During the first week of November 2022, he performed in the musical Parade to ensure that the performing arts can be enjoyed at an affordable rate for fans at the New York City Center.

== Personal life ==
Since 2018, Matarazzo has been in a relationship with actress Elizabeth Yu.

Matarazzo has ADHD.

== Acting credits ==
=== Film ===
| Year | Title | Role | Notes |
|---|---|---|---|
| 2019 | The Angry Birds Movie 2 | Bubba (voice) | |
| 2022 | Honor Society | Michael Dipnicky | |
| 2022 | My Father's Dragon | Boris the Dragon (voice) | |
| 2023 | Please Don't Destroy: The Treasure of Foggy Mountain | Himself | Cameo |
| 2025 | Animal Farm | Lucky (voice) | |
| 2026 | Pizza Movie | Jack | |
| TBA | Octet † | Toby | Filming |

=== Television ===
| Year | Title | Role | Notes |
|---|---|---|---|
| 2015 | The Blacklist | Finn | Episode: "The Kenyon Family (No. 71)" |
| 2016–2025 | Stranger Things | Dustin Henderson | Main role |
| 2017 | Ridiculousness | Himself | Episode: "Scarediculousness" |
| 2017 | Lip Sync Battle | Himself | Episode: "The Cast of Stranger Things" |
| 2018 | Drop the Mic | Himself | Episode: "Darren Criss vs. Gaten Matarazzo / Chandler Riggs vs. Chad Coleman" |
| 2019–2021 | Prank Encounters | Himself | Host and executive producer |
| 2021 | Nickelodeon's Unfiltered | Himself | Episode: "Be My Valentine" |
| 2021 | Waffles and Mochi | Casey the Electrician | Episode: "Mushroom" |
| 2024–2025 | Lego Star Wars: Rebuild the Galaxy | Sig Greebling | Main voice role |
| 2025 | Haunted Hotel | Randy | Voice, episode: "Randy Slasher" |
| 2026 | Saturday Night Live | Himself (cameo), Dustin Henderson | Episode: "Finn Wolfhard/ASAP Rocky" |
| 2026 | Adults | Alex Able | Episode: "Fake ID" |

=== Theater ===
| Year | Title | Role | Venue | Notes | Ref. |
|---|---|---|---|---|---|
| 2011–2012 | Priscilla, Queen of the Desert | Benjamin | Palace Theatre | Broadway replacement | |
| 2012 | Godspell | Jesus | Circle in the Square Theatre | Special performance | |
| 2012 | Radio City Christmas Spectacular | Ben | US tour | Rockettes' 85th Anniversary Celebration | |
| 2013 | Les Misérables | Gavroche | North American tour | 25th Anniversary | |
| 2014–2015 | Les Misérables | Gavroche / Petit Gervais | Imperial Theatre | Broadway | |
| 2019 | Into the Woods | Jack | Hollywood Bowl | Special performance | |
| 2022 | Dear Evan Hansen | Jared Kleinman | Music Box Theatre | Broadway replacement | |
| 2022 | Parade | Frankie Epps | New York City Center | Encores! | |
| 2023 | Sweeney Todd: The Demon Barber of Fleet Street | Tobias Ragg | Lunt-Fontanne Theatre | Broadway | |
| 2023 | Gutenberg! The Musical! | The Producer | James Earl Jones Theatre | Broadway (one night only) | |
| 2026-2027 | Rent | Mark Cohen | Tom Stoppard Theatre | West End | |

=== Music videos ===
| Year | Title | Artist | Ref. |
|---|---|---|---|
| 2017 | "Swish Swish" | Katy Perry (feat. Nicki Minaj) | |
| 2017 | "Lost Boys Life" | Computer Games | |
| 2020 | "Meet Me on the Roof" | Green Day | |

== Awards and nominations ==
| Year | Award | Category | Nominated work | Result | Ref. |
|---|---|---|---|---|---|
| 2017 | Young Artist Awards | Best Performance in a Digital TV Series or Film – Teen Actor | Stranger Things | Nominated | |
| 2017 | Screen Actors Guild Awards | Outstanding Performance by an Ensemble in a Drama Series | Stranger Things | Won | |
| 2017 | Shorty Awards | Best Actor | Stranger Things | Won | |
| 2018 | Screen Actors Guild Awards | Outstanding Performance by an Ensemble in a Drama Series | Stranger Things | Nominated | |
| 2018 | MTV Movie & TV Awards | Best On-Screen Team (with Finn Wolfhard, Caleb McLaughlin, Noah Schnapp and Sadie Sink) | Stranger Things | Nominated | |
| 2019 | Teen Choice Awards | Choice Summer TV Actor | Stranger Things | Nominated | |
| 2020 | Screen Actors Guild Awards | Outstanding Performance by an Ensemble in a Drama Series | Stranger Things | Nominated | |
| 2022 | Saturn Awards | Best Performance by a Younger Actor (Streaming) | Stranger Things | Nominated | |
| 2023 | Nickelodeon Kids' Choice Awards | Favorite Male TV Star (Family) | Stranger Things | Nominated | |
