= Bound for Glory (TV series) =

2005 American reality TV series

Bound for Glory is a reality television show which aired on ESPN from October to December 2005. The show featured former Chicago Bears linebacker Dick Butkus coaching the suburban Pittsburgh (Robinson based) Montour High School Spartans. The Spartans were a perennial Pennsylvania state champion contender in the 1950s and 1960s but had consistent losing records since. Butkus coached the team to a 1–6 record before leaving the team, claiming he had fulfilled his contract for the show. He was highly critical of the players, and chided them on the show for their poor attitude.
