= Parental Control =

- Created by: Bruce Klassen
- Directed by: Mitchell Kret; Bruce Lewis; Jesse Vallejo
- Country of origin: United States

Production
- Executive producer: Michael Canter
- Running time: approx. 0:22 (per episode)
- Production companies: Reveille Productions; Canter/Krask Industries; MTV Series Entertainment

Original release
- Network: MTV
- Release: February 6, 2006 – June 26, 2010

Parental Control is a reality television show about people looking for love produced by MTV. The two directors, Brendon Carter and Bruce Klassen, have also created other MTV shows. In Asia, this show was aired on Channel V from 2007 to 2009.

== Plot ==
The version which aired February 2006, differs from its premiere on MTV's Spring Break 2005 in March. A girl was to interview five boys, and after a set of about five questions for each person or an activity of some sort, the father will eliminate one of the contestants. This continues until one contestant remained.

In the latest version, parents (or in some cases, at least one parent and either their companion, their domestic partner, or the child's uncle or aunt) or guardians (either both grandparents or the child's older sibling, if any) from Los Angeles or elsewhere in Southern California are unhappy with their child's current companion. Auditions have started as the number of applicants must be given an interview from the parents who vie for the affections of their child and both parents would eventually pick the two potential companions. Afterwards, their child goes on a blind date with the two selections that each parent chose. The child then has to decide whether to keep their current relationship, stay single, or choose one of the new prospects from their parents. In one episode, Kids Are In Control, the roles are reversed; the children are unhappy with their parent's current companion.

During each date, the parents and the current companion watch and comment, often antagonistically, as the date unfolds on television. When the dates are finished, the child selects their new companion from amongst the competitors and current companion. First, one of the competitors is eliminated before the other two, then the child chooses between their current companion and the last remaining competitor, commenting what they liked from the remaining parent's choice and from their current companion. The child must make a decision:

- If they choose to stay with their current companion, their parents are angered and the eliminated competitor makes unpleasant and rude comments.
- If they choose their parents' choice, who becomes their new companion, their parents are happy, resulting in their current companion to leave angry and make unpleasant and rude comments.
- If they choose to leave single, their current companion and one of the dates their parents chose are eliminated.

The whole process often results in unpleasant behavior from the two who were eliminated. In a rare occasion, the child's chosen date would reject them and go with their previous companion. Another rare occasion had the child's chosen companion break up with them right away, leading the angry parent to chase after them.

Like some other reality shows aired on MTV, this show has been accused of being staged and fake.

== Ratings ==
Aside from the Spring Break 2005 premiere (which only had one episode), the show premiered in February 2006 as a spring replacement show without much hype or commercials. The show, much like other MTV dating shows (Next and Date My Mom), started off with few viewers and grew to a fair-rated show.

The first season ended airing new shows around June 2006, to make more room for new seasons of Made, Room Raiders, and Next, and start the new TV series Why Can't I Be You?. The second season began later that year in October.

In March 2007, a new series was filmed in UK.
