= November 13: Attack on Paris =

- Genre: Documentary
- Created by: Gédéon Naudet
- Directed by: Gédéon Naudet; Jules Naudet
- Country of origin: France
- Original language: French
- No. of seasons: 1
- No. of episodes: 3

Production
- Running time: 47–59 min.

Original release
- Network: Netflix
- Release: June 6, 2018

November 13: Attack on Paris is a 2018 French docu-series by French director duo the brothers Gédéon and Jules Naudet. The film depicts the events of November 13, 2015 when six locations around the city were attacked by ISIS terrorists, killing a total of 130 people and injuring hundreds more.

== Premise ==
November 13: Attack on Paris explores the events of November 13, 2015, when six locations around the city were attacked by ISIS terrorists, including the Stade de France and the Bataclan theatre, killing a total of 130 people and injuring hundreds more.

== Politicians interviewed ==
- Anne Hidalgo, Mayor of Paris
- François Hollande, former French President
- Bernard Cazeneuve, former Minister of the Interior

== Release ==
The film was released on June 6, 2018 on Netflix streaming.
