= Date My Mom =

- Genre: Dating game show
- Country of origin: United States
- Original language: English

Production
- Production companies: Kalissa Productions; Reveille Productions; MTV Series Entertainment

Original release
- Network: MTV
- Release: November 15, 2004 – 2006

Date My Mom is a television dating show that aired on the music channel MTV and was produced by Kalissa Productions. The series premiered on November 15, 2004 and ended in 2006. An 18- to 24-year-old heterosexual male, gay male or lesbian female, would go on three separate dates with three moms, who would try to convince them to pick their son or daughter to date. The dater only met the mother and made their decision solely on their impression of the mother and her description of her child.

The dates were varied and were occasionally geared towards the dater's interests. The dates ranged from a simple lunch date to cheerleading lessons, washing cars, picking wild flowers, cooking, sports, and even getting tattoos. (It usually depended on the person's likes and dislikes). At the end of the date the mother reported back to the child. The mothers and contestants tended to be very assured of their chances.

After all dates were completed, an elaborate beachfront finale was conducted. The dater explained to each mother why they did or did not choose her child, and one by one the sons or daughters were revealed according to the person's liking.

It has been alleged that the show is scripted.

== Similar reality shows ==
- Date My Mom (UK)
- Meet My Folks
- Who Wants to Marry My Dad?
- Parental Control
- Nicht Ohne Meine Mutter (German version)
- Wanna Come In?
- Твою маму! (Ukrainian version)
- Gledaj majku biraj ćerku (Serbian version)
