= The Restaurant (American TV series) =

- Genre: Reality television
- Starring: Rocco DiSpirito
- Country of origin: United States
- Original language: English
- No. of seasons: 2
- No. of episodes: 12

Production
- Producers: Mark Burnett; Robert Riesenberg; Ben Silverman
- Production locations: Gramercy Park, New York City
- Running time: 60 minutes

Original release
- Network: NBC
- Release: July 20, 2003 – June 5, 2004

The Restaurant is a reality television series that aired on NBC in 2003 on Sundays, with a second season broadcasting in 2004. The series had encore presentations on CNBC and Bravo.

Celebrity chef Rocco DiSpirito opened the Gramercy Park, New York City, restaurant Union Pacific in August 1997. The NBC series, it was announced, would follow DiSpirito as he launched and operated a new Manhattan Italian American restaurant. The first season revolved around the construction and opening of Rocco's on 22nd in the Flatiron District scheduled to open in five weeks. Some 7.5 million viewers tuned in for the July 20, 2003, premiere focusing on the search for a location and construction work for the new restaurant.

Among the 2000 people who showed up hoping to be hired were various actors, models and show business hopefuls. In addition to Rocco's mother, Nicolina DiSpirito, known for her famous meatballs, the show's on-camera personnel included David Miller (Sous-chef), Alex Corrado (Maitre d'), Mariani Ebert (Hostess), Domiziano Arcangeli (Himself), Heather Kristin (Waitress), Natalie Norman (Waitress), Topher Goodman (Waiter), Lisa Wurzel (Herself), Gideon Horowitz (Waiter), Heather Snell (Bartender), Amanda Congdon (Coat-check attendant), Pete Giovine (Waiter), Uzay Tumer (Captain), Emily Shaw (Captain), Lonn Coward (Waiter), Carrie Keranen (Waitress), Colleen Fitzgerald (Captain), Caroline Matler (Waitress), Brian Petruzzell (Busboy), Lola Belle (Bartender), Susanna Hari (Kitchen staff), Brian Allen (Waiter), Tony Acinapura (Chef), Massimiliano Bartoli (Chef), John Charlesworth (Kitchen staff), Laurent Saillard (General manager), Perry Pollaci (Kitchen staff), Matt DiBarro (Bartender).

Only 6.5 million viewers tuned in for the second-season premiere, despite launching a week after the finale of the hit first season of The Apprentice. The second season, filmed six months after the restaurant's opening, showed an ongoing power conflict between part owner Rocco DiSpirito and financier Jeffrey Chodorow, stemming from the restaurant's lack of profitability despite its popularity.

On July 27, 2004, New York Supreme Court Judge Ira Gammerman issued an injunction barring Rocco DiSpirito from Rocco's on 22nd street and gave Jeffrey Chodorow permission to sell or reopen the restaurant under a new theme. Chodorow and DiSpirito were ordered to return to court on August 31 to determine if there was an agreement between the parties and if DiSpirito violated the agreement. After that ruling DiSpirito attempted to file a $6 million countersuit charging that Chodorow made accounting irregularities and that DiSpirito was owed $175,000 in unpaid salary, and DiSpirito sought to regain fifty percent ownership of the restaurant. Chodorow initially invested $4 million in the restaurant and claims to have lost an additional $700,000.

After the restaurant closed its doors on September 15, 2004, it reopened in 2005 as a Brazilian steakhouse called Caviar & Banana. Chodorow's partner in the Brazilian restaurant was chef Claude Troisgros of Roanne, France, renowned for his namesake restaurant in Rio de Janeiro, Brazil. Caviar & Banana has since closed, along with the subsequent Borough Food & Drink restaurant and Almond, a French bistro opened by Jason Weiner and Eric Lemonides, the men behind Almond and Almoncello in the Hamptons.

== Critical reception ==
Metro Weekly said "Countless viewers will love The Restaurant, and they should. It’s a good show. But after years of dining on the usual fare of tired reality, sometimes you just want to be blown away. Alas, the wait continues."

The Sacramento Bee wrote "Confession time: I'm addicted to NBC's semi-reality, semi-documentary series, "The Restaurant." It's partly because of its energy, partly because it feels like a night out, but mostly because it is spellbinding to watch a man unravel right in front of us."

New York Post writer Linda Stasi, who was mistaken for a New York Post food critic on the show, wrote "I’m here to report that “reality TV” is about as real as David Gest‘s face. It’s life, as edited. Too bad that feature isn’t available in real life. Then there’s the fact that I’m not the food critic as implied in the promos – not that I would shy away from giving my opinion about something I know basically nothing about. High-stakes high jinks, methinks."
