= Martha Ansara =

US born Australian documentary filmmaker

- Born: United States
- Citizenship: Australian
- Education: Australian Film, Television and Radio School, University of Technology, Sydney
- Occupations: Documentary filmmaker, cinematographer, screenwriter
- Years active: 1969–present
- Employer: Ballad Films

Martha Ansara is a US-born Australian documentary filmmaker, writer, oral historian, and educator. Ansara was one of the first women in Australia to work as a cinematographer, and a founding member and/or convenor of the Sydney Women's Film Group in the early 1970s, the Film and Broadcast Industries Oral History Group, the Archive Forum (which lobbied for the establishment of the National Film and Sound Archive as a statutory body), and of Ozdox, the Australian Documentary Forum.

== Early life and education ==
Martha Ansara was born in the United States, where her father was a leading figure in the Syrian-Lebanese community and her mother an educator specialising in dyslexia.

She migrated to Australia in 1969, becoming involved in the Sydney Filmmakers Co-operative. She started making films with other young filmmakers through the co-operative, but at that time professional cinematography was dominated by men and it was difficult to get work. However, in 1975 she was admitted as a student in the first three-year full-time course of the Australian Film and Television School (now AFTRS), graduating in 1978.

Later, in 1994, she gained a master's degree in Applied History from the University of Technology Sydney.

== Career ==
Ansara was one of the first women in Australia to work as a cinematographer, and is known for her social documentaries.

=== 1970s–1990s ===
After graduating from film school, Ansara gained experience as a camera assistant.

She also began writing reviews and articles on film for Filmnews, the monthly newspaper of the Sydney Filmmakers Co-operative, and then for a range of publications. Ansara admired Dutch documentary filmmaker Joris Ivens, whom she met in 1980, and wrote about in Filmnews'.

She also worked extensively as an assessor of projects for government film bodies and was involved in promoting the development of women's filmmaking through the Sydney Women's Film Group (SWFG), established in 1973, along with Jeni Thornley. Ansara was also involved in the Women's Film Fund of the Australian Film Commission.

In the 1970s, Ansara formed many of the relationships with filmmakers and activists which she was to sustain in the following decades. She was involved in the anti-Vietnam War movement and joined the Association for International Disarmament and Co-operation, which became People for Nuclear Disarmament (PND). With the support of that organisation, she later made one of the first documentaries to be shot by Westerners in Vietnam, Changing the Needle. (1982) with peace activist Mavis Robertson and filmmaker Dasha Ross. She subsequently worked with PND as an organizer of the Pacific Peacemaker project

In 1973, A Film for Discussion, long in the making after being shot in 1970, was released by the Sydney Women's Film Group. The title reflects the group's wish "to distinguish it from films where the audience members were merely passive consumers of entertainment".

During this period, Ansara was an active member of the Australian Theatrical and Amusement Employees' Association, becoming the convener of its motion picture sub-committee. She was a foundation member of the Rank and File Movement within the union which came to power briefly in the late 1980s.

In 1976 Ansara was introduced to the realities of Aboriginal Australians through community activist and singer Essie Coffey. She subsequently photographed Coffey's film My Survival as an Aboriginal (1979), which she co-produced with Coffey Coffey and Ansara later collaborated again to make a sequel, My Life As I Live It (1993). My Survival as an Aboriginal was later selected for restoration by Australia's National Film and Sound Archive.

In 1978, Ansara made Secret Storm, about a young woman who questions her role as mother. In the same year, she appeared in the feature film Third Person Plural, directed by James Ricketson and also starring Bryan Brown.

In 1983, Ansara photographed Lousy Little Sixpence, a documentary about the Stolen Generations made by Alec Morgan, Aboriginal media pioneer Lester Bostock and his brother, Gerry Bostock. She also worked in Western Australia with Aboriginal activist Robert Bropho to photograph Munda Nyuringu and Always Was, Always Will Be (1989), a documentary on the Swan Brewery Dispute, which she and Bropho made together. In 1989, Ansara, with assistance from Bropho and others involved in the protest, researched and wrote a history of the dispute as a book of the same title with support from a Creative Arts Fellowship at the Humanities Research Centre, Australian National University.

In 1988 she produced the anti-nuclear feature film The Pursuit of Happiness (1987) which she directed. The peace project also included the book of the same title by Karen Throssell The finance for this film was raised largely from private sources, including the proceeds of the sale of the Victoria Cross won at Gallipoli by Hugo Throssell and donated to the project by his son, diplomat and writer Ric Throssell, the father of Karen Throssell. Jeni Thornley, interviewing Ansara about the film in February 1988, described it as "about so much: motherhood, war, capitalism, change, values, how to live one's life, and it's also about women's economic independence from men. There you've got the metaphor of marriage, the US-Australia alliance..."

Ansara was a founding convenor of the Film and Broadcast Industries Oral History Group (as of 2025 Australian Media Oral History Group), which was founded in April 1991 "as an independent body in response to the growing concerns of oral historians and Australian filmmakers that the National Film and Sound Archive (NFSA) was no longer doing enough to encourage the recording and dissemination of the oral histories of film and broadcast industry veterans". The members of this group included film historian Graham Shirley and screenwriter-producer Joan Long. The group was associated with the NFSA.

Ansara gained a master's degree in Applied History from the University of Technology Sydney in 1994.

She was also involved with the Balmain Resident Action group.

In this period Ansara gradually stopped working as a cinematographer and increasingly began teaching film, including as a lecturer at the University of Technology Sydney.

In 1999, she attended the Créteil International Women's Film Festival, where her films were screened in a tribute to Australian Women's Cinema.

=== 2000s ===
In 2002, Ansara produced the documentary Ordinary People, directed by Jennifer Rutherford and narrated by Tara Morice, which follows One Nation candidate Colene Hughes over two years and two elections.

In 2003, Ansara joined other documentary-makers, including Jeni Thornley, Pat Fiske, Rod Freedman, and Mitzi Goldman, in forming Ozdox, the Australian Documentary Forum.

Also around 2003, she was a founding member of the Archive Forum, which lobbied for the establishment of the National Film and Sound Archive as a statutory body, a goal finally accomplished in 2008.

In 2008 Ansara, as a member of the Australian Cinematographers Society, was asked to work with the ACS on a photographic history of cinematography in Australia. This project, significantly relying on oral history, became the book, The Shadowcatchers: A history of cinematography in Australia. Upon its launch, Ansara wrote "For me, The Shadowcatchers is, among other things, a tribute to the importance of the NFSA to our national heritage – to our understanding of the past".

Also in 2005, she produced the documentary I Remember 1948, directed by Fadia Abboud. Screened on SBS television and in both Arabic and English, the film features four Palestinian elders who give eye-witness accounts of the tumultuous days of the Nakba, the catastrophe of May 15th, 1948, .

In 2009 she directed and co-produced the silent short comedy drama film The Ballad of Betty and Joe, with the assistance of many of her students.

Ansara retired from filmmaking, after assisting Robynne Murphy in producing the 2020 documentaryWomen of Steel about the Wollongong Jobs for Women Campaign.

== Memberships and other roles ==
Ansara is a full member of the Australian Cinematographers Society (ACS).

She is a life member of the Australian Directors Guild and a founding member of Ozdox, the Australian Documentary Forum. (Note: Ozdox appears to have folded sometime after September 2021. Upcoming event: Disinformation – 11th March, 2020. Making factual stories in the age of fake news, disinformation and misinformation. (last archived screen); "Bandwidth exceeded". However the OzDox Community Noticeboard is still very active on Facebook.)

Ansara is also a member of the Society of Australian Cinema Pioneers.

She has been involved in many industry organisations and campaigns, including Motion Picture Subcommittee AT&AEA as well as various women's groups and initiatives. She has been appointed as a selector and juror for film awards and festivals; has acted as a project assessor for film funding; and has been a film valuer for the Cultural Gifts Program.

She has also worked as a film lecturer in Australian film history and as an oral historian. She has written about film, and been active in the trade union, women's, and peace movements.

== Recognition and awards ==
Ansara's documentary films have been screened in Australia, the UK, Europe, and North America and some have won international prizes.

In 1987, Ansara was awarded the Australian Film Institute's Byron Kennedy Award This award is given "for outstanding creative enterprise within the film and television industries... to an individual or organization whose work embodies the qualities of [producer] Byron Kennedy: innovation, vision and the relentless pursuit of excellence".

She received the Women's Electoral Lobby's Edna Ryan Award for Media/Communication in 2001.

Ansara was inducted into the ACS Hall of Fame in 2015.

In November 2017, she was the subject of "Salute" presented by OzDox and the Australian Cinematographers Society.

== Personal life ==
Ansara is the mother of three children, including Lee Tillam, Matthew Kay and Australian actor Alice Ansara.

== Selected filmography ==
- 1973 Film for Discussion (drama documentary) (director, producer)
- 1977 Me and Daphne (short drama) (cinematographer, co-producer)
- 1978 Letters from Poland (short drama) (cinematographer)
- 1979 Child Welfare (documentary) (cinematographer)
- 1979 My Survival as an Aboriginal (documentary) (cinematographer, co-producer)
- 1980 Climbers (dance drama) (cinematographer)
- 1980 Age Before Beauty (documentary) (cinematographer)
- 1981 Flamingo Park (documentary) (cinematographer)
- 1982 Changing the Needle (documentary) (co-director/producer, cinematographer)
- 1985 Taking a Look (short drama) (cinematographer)
- 1985 Rocking the Foundations (documentary) (cinematographer)
- 1988 The Pursuit of Happiness (feature drama) (director, producer)
- 1994 My Life as I Live It (documentary) (cinematographer, co-director, co-producer)
- 2002 Ordinary People (documentary) (producer)
- 2005 I Remember 1948 (documentary) (producer)
- 2009 The Ballad of Betty and Joe (short drama) (director, co-producer)
- 2020 Women of Steel (documentary) (consulting producer)

== Selected publications ==
- Always Was, Always Will Be: The sacred grounds of the Waugal, Kings Park, Perth W.A.: the Old Swan Brewery dispute (1989), Balmain, NSW, Fringe Dwellers of the Swan Valley, ISBN 0731675711 / 0-7316-7571-1
- The Shadowcatchers: A history of cinematography in Australia (2012), North Sydney, Austcine, ISBN 9780987225207
