= Lilias Fraser =

One of the first Australian women documentary filmmakers

- Born: 19 April 1930; Brisbane, Queensland, Australia
- Died: 26 October 2004 (aged 74); Sydney, Australia
- Education: Institut des hautes études cinématographiques
- Occupation: Documentary filmmaker
- Years active: 1957–1996
- Spouse: Norman Castle
- Children: 2

Lilias Fraser (19 April 1930 – 26 October 2004) was one of Australia’s first women documentary filmmakers. She made over 40 films between 1957 and 1996. In 1968, Fraser made the first ever documentary about Indigenous land rights in Australia, a short film titled This is Their Land. In 1999 Fraser was awarded the Cecil Holmes Award for Services to Directing.

Fraser was the mother of two children who also worked in film: Claudia Castle, best known as a director of music videos for such artists as The Saints, Midnight Oil and INXS, and Jane Castle, an environmentalist and multi-award-winning filmmaker and cinematographer. The 2021 documentary, When the Camera Stopped Rolling (2021) documents the relationship between Fraser and her Jane Castle.

== Early life and education ==
Lilias Eve Fraser was born in Brisbane on 19 April 1930. Her parents, Claude Archibald Fraser and Marjorie Gladys Robina Leitch were married in 1925. They had four children, Lilias being the second oldest. In 1923 Claude Fraser opened what is considered to be the first self-service grocery store in Australia, Brisbane Cash and Carry (BCC), ultimately expanding BCC into a highly profitable chain of 32 stores.

Lilias Fraser attended Somerville House, a Presbyterian and Methodist girls' secondary college where she was school captain and became friends with future arts administrator Betty Churcher.

== Career ==
Fraser became a filmmaker.

=== 1950s ===
In 1952, Fraser and Betty Churcher set off for London, at that time a key destination for artistic Australians, fleeing what they regarded as a difficult climate for the arts at home. Churcher studied painting at London’s Royal College of Art. Fraser enrolled in the Photography Department, Guildford School of Art and Photography, headed by Ifor and Joy Thomas who are regarded as having laid the foundations for a generation of successful and influential photographers and film directors.

After returning to Australia, Fraser made her first documentary, a short which she shot single-handedly on Stradbroke Island, entitled The Beach (1957). She travelled to Sydney with the film in search of further employment and eventually sold it to the Australian Broadcasting Commission (ABC – later Australian Broadcasting Corporation). She also became a production assistant at the Commonwealth Film Unit (CFU), later Film Australia, headed by Producer-in-Chief Stanley Hawes.

In 1958 Hawes gave her the job of researching and writing the CFU educational documentary ‘Nests in the Bush. In her oral history for the National Film & Sound Archive, Fraser recalls that this was one of the first films the CFU shot in 16mm rather than 35mm and that she wrote the voice over and also edited it, ‘because in those days we did everything. Stanley said, "Nobody can make any films unless they learn to edit."'. Despite this promising beginning and encouraged by director John Heyer, she left the CFU to enroll in a French national film school, the Institut des hautes etudes cinématographiques (IDHEC) in Paris.

By this time, Fraser had met her future husband Norman Castle, who resigned from his job in the public service and followed her to France. There she became involved with Le Groupe des Trente, a new-wave attempt by Alain Resnais, Jean-Luc Godard and others to revive documentary.

=== 1960s ===
By 1960, having run into Stanley Hawes in Paris, Fraser was back at the Commonwealth Film Unit where she co-produced the documentary Children’s Theatre (1961) and then moved into directing, becoming one of a handful of women to direct films in Australia at that time.

In February 1961, Fraser, by then pregnant with her daughter Claudia, married Castle and they began making films together, sometimes taking first one and then two children with them on location. Castle acted as producer and promoter while Fraser wrote, directed and edited. In her oral history for the National Film & Sound Archive, she recalls that on occasion she did some of the photography herself, most notably for Waterbirds of the Inland (1965), positioned in a bird hide at Lake Narran, far northwest NSW, resting her camera on her pregnant belly. Not surprisingly, her youngest daughter, Jane Castle, born in 1964, became the second woman to be accredited by the Australian Cinematographers Society.

In 1968, Fraser made the first ever documentary about Indigenous land rights in Australia, titled This is Their Land. It was shot on 16 mm black and white film, and was 10 minutes long. It shows a protest walk from Australia Square in Sydney to La Perouse, New South Wales, to raise funds for Aboriginal education. The activists pictured on the march include Oodgeroo Noonuccal, as well as children and clergy.

=== 1970s – 1980s ===
In the early 1970s Fraser continued to make sponsored documentaries through Fraser-Castle Productions and also directed children's television for the ABC. However, in 1975 the Fraser-Castle partnership – both personal and business – was dissolved and Fraser formed her own company Fraser Films. Although she had been offered steady directing work at the ABC, the hours would have conflicted with the demands of being a single mother and Fraser continued making sponsored films through her own company which offered greater flexibility. In 1975, she also returned to Film Australia to make two educational documentaries.

In 1979, in the aftermath of the break-up of her marriage and business, there were debts to pay ‘all over town” and at the same time Fraser’s work began decreasing. It was then that she saw an advertisement for a job in distribution for the Sydney Filmmakers Co-operative and became the Co-op’s Community Film Worker. For five months she traveled through New South Wales, meeting people from government departments, trade unions, women’s groups, youth groups, migrant groups and, indeed, community organisations of all kinds. She later said that this, as she was nearing fifty, was the beginning of her political education. It was a significant transformation - from the conventional society belle (and her gowns) as described in 1950 by The Brisbane-Courier Mail to the activist educator appearing thirty years later in the pages of the Sydney Filmmakers Cooperative’s newspaper, Filmnews. The Co-op offered her not only politically stimulating activities but also friendship with the next generation of independent filmmakers. Fraser started hiring young cinematographers on her documentaries, most notably future Oscar-winner Andrew Lesnie.

During the 1980s, Fraser continued making sponsored films but also took on short contracts in training and distribution. Significantly, Fraser worked at the Australian Film Television & Radio School as Coordinator of their Industry Training Scheme for Women with the aim of enabling assistants in camera, sound, directing and producing roles to move into higher positions.

=== 1990s ===
Although Fraser's sponsored film work was coming to a close, she now had the opportunity to produce and direct a documentary different in both content and form from those she had been making for most of her career. The result was Women of the Iron Ore Frontier, photographed by her daughter Jane Castle ACS.

The film is the story of four women in the mining town of Newman located in the remote Pilbara region of Western Australia. Through the lives of these women, the documentary looks at the realities that Fraser had observed but was not able to include in her sponsored films: isolation, women’s unemployment, industrial disputes and racism. Women of the Iron Ore Frontier was selected for screening at the prestigious French Documentary Festival Cinema du Reel, which celebrates the presence of the filmmaker’s point of view.

== Recognition ==
In 1999 Fraser was awarded the Cecil Holmes Award for Services to Directing by the Australian Screen Directors Association (later known as the Australian Directors Guild).

== Later life and death ==
By the mid-1990s, Fraser's film production work had come to an end. In her retirement, she helped her daughter Claudia with her grandchildren and between 1994 and 1996 co-produced the feminist documentary by Film Co-op associate Jeni Thornley, To the Other Shore.

She had dementia for some time before her death on 26 October 2004.

== On film ==
The documentary When the Camera Stopped Rolling (2021), produced by former Film Co-op colleague Pat Fiske, was nominated in four categories at the AACTA Awards. The film documents the relationship between Lilias Fraser and her daughter Jane Castle, while exploring women's roles in the Australian film industry.
