= Ricketson =

Ricketson is a surname. Notable people with the surname include:

- Damien Ricketson (born 1973), Australian composer
- Doug Ricketson (1939–2019), Australian rugby league footballer
- Frank H. Ricketson Jr. (1895–1987), American movie theater executive and civic leader
- Gail Ricketson (born 1953), American rower
- James Ricketson (born 1949), Australian filmmaker
- Luke Ricketson (born 1973), Australian rugby league footballer
- Merren Ricketson, Australian arts educator
- Staniforth Ricketson (1891–1967), Australian financier
