= Throssell =

Throssell is a surname. Notable people with the surname include:

- Brianna Throssell (born 1996), Australian swimmer
- George Throssell (1840–1910), premier of Western Australia for the second ministry of the Government of Western Australia
- Hugo Throssell (1884–1933), his son and Victoria Cross recipient
- Ric Throssell (1922–1999), Australian diplomat and author; son of Hugo Throssell

== See also ==
- Throssell, Western Australia, a town in the Shire of Northam
