= Paul Winkler (director) =

German-born Australian filmmaker (born 1939)

- Born: 22 June 1939 (age 87); Hamburg, Germany
- Occupation: Filmmaker
- Writing career
- Genres: Film, Experimental Film, Avant-garde film

Paul Winkler (born 22 June 1939) is a German-born Australian filmmaker who lives and works in Sydney. He was associated with Corinne and Arthur Cantrill, Albie Thoms and David Perry in pioneering local experimental film production in the 1960s.

== Career ==
Born in Hamburg Germany, Winkler underwent a bricklaying apprenticeship before migrating to Australia in 1959. His self-education in film and film history began in 1962, when he produced his first films in 8mm on Bell & Howell and Canon cameras. In 1967, he switched to 16mm and a Bolex camera which he has used ever since.

Winkler characterises his films as "a synthesis of intellect and emotion, filtered through the plastic material of film". "I try to let 'imagines' flow freely to the surface". The ideas which he terms ‘imagines’ may reflect Australian icons like Bondi Beach, Ayers Rock/Uluru and the Sydney Harbour Bridge, or textures, as in Bark/Rind, Green Canopy, and the bush.

In 1973, Winkler's film Dark identified with the Aboriginal land rights movement, acquiring a spirituality which was also manifested in Chants and Red Church. Later films take contemporary society for their subject, as in Rotation, Time out for Sport and Long Shadows. His early apprenticeship is recalled in Brickwall, Backyard and Brick and Tile.

In 1995, the Museum of Contemporary Art and Sydney Intermedia Network mounted a retrospective screening of 30 of his films. The following year, the Carpenter Center for the Visual Arts, Harvard University, United States screened 30 films in a three-day retrospective.

== Films in 16 mm ==
- Many Buddhas (2008)
- Popkitsch (2006)
- Fischtank (2004)
- Turmoil (2000)
- Rotation (1998)
- Capillary Action (1997)
- Time out for Sport (1996)
- Green Canopy (1994)
- Elevated Shores (1993)
- Long Shadows (1991)
- Glitter (1990)
- Faint Echos (1988)
- Facades (1987)
- Australian Bush (1986)
- Incongruous (1984)
- Brick and Tile (1983)
- Traces (1982)
- Ayers Rock (1981)
- Urban Spaces (1980)
- Sydney-Bush (1980)
- Taylor Square (1980)
- Cars (1979)
- Bondi (1979)
- Window (1978/79)
- Sydney Harbour Bridge (1977)
- Bark-Rind (1977)
- Red Church (1976)
- Backyard (1976)
- Brickwall (1975)
- Chants (1974/75)
- Dark (1973/74)
- Scars (1970/71)
- Neurosis (1970)
- Requiem No.1 (1969)
- Red and Green (1968)
- Isolated (1967)

== Awards ==
- Turmoil --- Finalist - Dendy Awards, Sydney Film Festival 2000
- Rotation --- Directors Choice Award, Black Maria Film & Video Festival, Jersey City, USA 2000 & Best Experimental Film, Melbourne Film Festival 1999 & Finalist, Dendy Award, Sydney Film Festival 1998 & Honorable Mention, Ann Arbor Film Festival, USA 1999
- Capillary Action --- Directors Choice Award, Black Maria Film & Video Festival, Jersey City, USA 2000 & Finalist - Dendy Award, Sydney Film Festival 1998
- Time out for Sport --- Best Editing, Ann Arbor Film Festival, USA 1996 & Finalist - Dendy Awards Sydney Film Festival 1996
- Long Shadows --- Erwin Rado Award, Best Australian Short Film, Melbourne Film Festival 1992
- Brick & Tile --- Best Experimental Film, Australian Film Institute Awards 1984
- Traces --- Silver Boomerang, Melbourne Film Festival 1983 & Honorable Mention, Baltimore Film Festival USA 1984
- Ayers Rock --- Prize money, Ann Arbor Film Festival, USA 1983
- Urban Spaces --- Second Prize, Experimental, Baltimore Film Festival 1983
- Sydney-Bush --- Silver Boomerang, Melbourne Film Festival 1981 & Price Winner, Ann Arbor Film Festival, USA 1981
- Bondi --- Silver Award, Experimental, Australian Film Awards 1979
- Sydney Harbour Bridge --- Gold Award – Best Experimental, Australian Film Awards 1979
- Bark Rind --- Price Winner, Ann Arbor Film Festival, USA 1977
- Red Church --- Greater Union Awards: 1st Prize, Experimental, Sydney Film Festival 1976
- Chants --- Greater Union Awards: Finalist, Experimental, Sydney Film Festival 1975
- Dark --- Greater Union Awards: 1st Prize, Experimental, Sydney Film Festival 1974 & Silver Award: Experimental Films, Chicago International Film Festival 1974
- Scars --- Alan Stout Award 1st Prize: Most Creative Entry, 1973 & Silver Award, Experimental Section, Australian Film Institute Awards 1973
