= The Pursuit of Happiness (1988 film) =

- Directed by: Martha Ansara
- Written by: Martha Ansara, Alex Glasgow, Laura Black
- Produced by: Martha Ansara
- Starring: Anna Gare; Peter Hardy; Laura Black
- Cinematography: Michael Edols
- Edited by: Kit Guyatt
- Release date: 1988
- Country: Australia
- Language: English

The Pursuit of Happiness is a 1988 Australian feature film directed and produced by Martha Ansara.

== Synopsis ==
The Pursuit Of Happiness is set in the port town of Fremantle, Western Australia during the buildup to the 1988 America's Cup yacht race. During this time, there was public debate about nuclear warships visiting the port. It is a fiction film containing many documentary elements, including local people as themselves, clips relating to real events, references to real international issues, including the threat of nuclear war. The film focuses on one family, with the marital relationship coming under pressure as the woman investigates local attitudes about the presence of the US ships.

== Cast ==
- Laura Black
- Peter Hardy
- Anna Gare
- Jack Coleman

== Background ==
In the mid-1980s, US-born Australian cinematographer Martha Ansara was involved in the Australian anti-nuclear movement and wanted to make a film about Australia's relationship with the US.

== Production ==
The Pursuit of Happiness was accompanied by the book The Pursuit of Happiness : Australia, "the empire', ANZUS, nuclear disarmament and neutrality by Karen Throssell. The finance for the film was raised largely from private sources, including the proceeds of the sale of the Victoria Cross won at Gallipoli by Hugo Throssell and donated to the project by his son, diplomat and writer Ric Throssell, the father of Karen Throssell.

Jeni Thornley, interviewing Ansara about the film in February 1988, described it as "about so much: motherhood, war, capitalism, change, values, how to live one's life, and it's also about women's economic independence from men. There you've got the metaphor of marriage, the US-Australia alliance..."

== Release and reception ==
The film was released in 1988.

Ansara said in a 1998 interview about the film:

It was a bit of a crude analysis, but it took so long to make (under the 10BA system) that by the time we finished the film - it was 1987 - for various reasons, the anti-nuclear movement was on the way out, so the film missed its time. And with films, timing is everything. If we had done it in a year, which we couldn't, it probably would have done very, very well. As it was, it did return 40 percent to the investors, but that was because it was very low-budget. The interesting thing about the film is that, if the audience was not very sophisticated, they liked it enormously. If they were sophisticated, they thought it was really daggy.
