= Archie Weller =

Australian writer

Archie Weller (born 1957) is an Australian writer of novels, short stories and screen plays.

== Early life and education ==
Archie Weller was born in 1957 in Subiaco, Western Australia, and grew up on a farm, Wonnenup, near Cranbrook in the Great Southern region of the state. He has claimed to be of partial Aboriginal heritage, though this has been disputed.

He attended Guildford Grammar School in Perth as a boarder. His mother was a journalist and his father was a farmer. As a young child Weller was encouraged by his grandfather to write.

== Writing ==
Weller's first book, The Day of the Dog, was written, in his own words, "within a period of six weeks in a spirit of anger after his release from Broome jail for what he regarded as a wrongful conviction".

Weller's second novel, a fantasy novel entitled Land of the Golden Clouds, was published in 1998.

=== Going Home ===
The title story in the collection Going Home deals with the complexities of the Aboriginal identity in Australia. It is set in the 1980s, and the protagonist has succeeded at university. He excels at sports, studies art and does paintings that are admired by the white community. But in achieving this acceptance he has turned his back on his home and his family. He feels white, but at the same time he is proud to be black. On his 21st birthday, nostalgia for his roots leads him to return to the camp of his birth, only to discover that his new "white" identity is invisible in the darkness of ignorance and prejudice.

Another story in the collection, "Herbie", is about a white boy named Davey who witnesses the killing of an Aboriginal boy and though he is cruel to the boy and offers no resistance to the boys who eventually result in his death, the boy sympathises with Herbie's mother and shows remorse.

== Recognition and awards ==
The Day of the Dog won the 1980 The Australian/Vogel Literary Award and in 1982 the inaugural Prose Fiction award in the Western Australia Week Literary Awards(now Western Australian Premier's Book Awards).

In 1983 Weller received the FAW Patricia Weickhardt Award to an Aboriginal Writer.

In 1993 The Day of the Dog was made into a film entitled Blackfellas, directed by James Ricketson and co-written by the director and Weller. It won two AFI Awards in 1993.

The script Confessions of a Headhunter, which Weller co-wrote with Sally Riley, won an award in the 2001 Western Australian Premier's Book Awards, the Cinema Nova Award, and the 2000 Australian Film Institute Awards for Best Short Fiction Film, and the 2001 Film Critics Circle of Australia award for Best Short Film.

== Bibliography ==
=== Novels ===
- Day of the Dog (Allen & Unwin, 1981)
- Land of the Golden Clouds (Allen & Unwin, 1998)

=== Poetry ===
- The Unknown Soldier and other poems (Access Press, 2007)

=== Short stories ===
- Going Home: Stories (Allen & Unwin, 1986)Review
  - Pension Day
  - Dead Dingo
  - Johnny Blue
  - Stolen Car
  - Sandcastles
  - Herbie
  - Fish and Chips
- The Window Seat (University of Queensland Press, 2009)

=== Drama and screenplays ===
- Nidjera: Children Crying Softly Together: A Play Exploring The Emotions of a Modern Day Koori Family (1990)
- Saturday Night, Sunday Morning, with Rima Tamou (1999)
- Confessions of a Headhunter, with Sally Riley (2000)

=== As editor ===
- Us Fellas: An Anthology of Aboriginal Writing, with Colleen Glass (Perth: Artlook, 1987)
- This All Come Back Now: An Anthology of First Nations Speculative Fiction, with Mykaela Saunders (University of Queensland Press, 2022)
