= Essie Coffey =

Aboriginal Australian activist and filmmaker

- Born: Essieina Shillingsworth Jibbah c. 1941; Near Goodooga, New South Wales, Australia
- Died: 3 January 1998 (aged 56)
- Other names: "Bush Queen of Brewarrina", Essieina Goodgabah

Essie Coffey OAM (born Essieina Shillingsworth Jibbah; c. 1941 – 3 January 1998), also known as Essieina Goodgabah and "Bush Queen of Brewarrina", was an Aboriginal Australian community worker, filmmaker, singer, and advocate for Indigenous Australians. She is known for having co-founded the Western Aboriginal Legal Service to serve western New South Wales, and for her 1978 feature film My Survival as an Aboriginal, the first documentary film directed by an Aboriginal woman. She also served on a number of community organisations and government bodies. She lived in Brewarrina for much of her life.

== Early life and education ==
Essieina Shillingsworth Jibbah (Note: Her tribal name.) was born near Goodooga in northern New South Wales, Australia, (Note: The Australian Women's Register shows her birthplace as southern Queensland, but this is the only on, so it is assumed incorrect.) with her birth year variously cited as 1940, 1941, or 1942. The name "Essieina" means "flower of the honey tree". Her father, Donald Goodgabah, was an elder of the Muruwari people, who resisted the government's forced relocations of Aboriginal people in the 1930s. Her mother, Ruby Bailey, spoke to her in her Aboriginal language. Coffey was the youngest of eight children; she had two sisters and my five brothers, and the family lived in the bush with their parents. She later said that she thought she was lucky to be brought up this way, free and able to learn her own culture and traditions, not having to grow up in a white man's mission (Aboriginal reserve). They avoided forced relocation to a reserve by following seasonal work on farms. With her family, Coffey travelled from station to station, performing tasks such as ringbarking, fencing, woodcutting, droving, and taming wild horses.

She was a Muruwari woman, and was also known as Essieina Goodgabah, and, later, "Bush Queen of Brewarrina".

== Career ==
=== Community work and advocacy ===
In the 1960s and '70s she worked in health and legal services for Aboriginal people. In the 1960s, with Tombo Winters (Thomas "Tombo" Martin Winters, c. 1938) and Steve Gordon, she co-founded the Aboriginal Movement in Brewarrina (which, among other things, successfully campaigned for integration of the open-air cinema in Brewarrina), and they co-founded the Western Aboriginal Legal Service (WALS) in the 1970s. WALS is an ATSILS which services the western area of New South Wales, and continues to operate out of its main office in Dubbo and a second office in Bourke.

In 1974, when a huge flood hit Brewarrina, Coffey was called upon, along with Tombo Winters, Steve Gordon, and Phil Eyre, to mobilise the Aboriginal community to build levees. Winters pulled the workers off the levee when he realised that it would not protect West Brewarrina ("Dodge City"), where most of the Aboriginal community lived, and the SES was not providing a boat to ferry people from Dodge City to the town.

Coffey also co-founded the Aboriginal Heritage and Cultural Museum in Brewarrina around 1991.

She also served on several government bodies and Aboriginal community organisations. She was an elected member of the NSW Aborigines Advisory Council, which led to serving on the New South Wales Aboriginal Lands Trust, which existed from 1974 to 1983. In 1977 she was the only woman member.

She was an inaugural member of the Council for Aboriginal Reconciliation in 1991, and a member of the Ngemba Housing Cooperative in the 1990s. Also in the 1990s, Coffey supervised the Community Development Employment Project in Brewarrina, and promoted the scheme as essential to Aboriginal self-determination.

Coffey was a regional councillor for the Wakamurra region (northwest NSW) on the Aboriginal and Torres Strait Islander Commission (better known as ATSIC). ATSIC commissioner Steve Gordon, who worked with her for more than 30 years, said that she "paved the way by always fighting discrimination head on".

She also had a deep interest in women's issues, and was co-founder of Magunya Aboriginal Women's Issue, helped to create the first women's knock-out football team in northwestern NSW.

=== Filmmaking ===
Coffey appeared in Philip Noyce's 1977 film Backroads as herself. In the film, Coffey talks about the struggle for Indigenous land rights. Backroads was "the first feature film in which Aboriginal actors made a major creative contribution other than acting".

She then became an active filmmaker.

In 1978 she directed My Survival as an Aboriginal, a documentary film produced by Martha Ansara. In the film, which was the first documentary to be directed by an Aboriginal woman, Coffey relates what happened to her people in Brewarrina. Romaine Moreton of the National Film and Sound Archive wrote of the film:

Essie Coffey's passion for her culture and her stoic dedication to her people is tangible in this film. As a charismatic, dedicated woman, she invites the audience into her community. And while she brings to the fore the hardships endured by her community, she is continually focused on the power and richness of traditional knowledge and skills, and the power of her cultural connection to land. In this, Coffey not only raises issues of the impact of colonisation on Indigenous peoples, but also offers a solution by way of continuing cultural practice... My Survival as an Aboriginal, though a call to justice, is also tempered with beauty, and the audience is allowed to glimpse the private world of Essie Coffey and the people of Brewarrina.

In 1980, she appeared as Maggie in Part 2 of the award-winning SBS TV historical drama miniseries Women of the Sun, titled "Maydina: The Shadow".

She said in 1980 that she intended to make more documentary films, "to communicate to the world, to let them know that there's Aboriginals still alive and that we are an independent race, an Aboriginal race, that wants to be recognised, that's all we want. We want to be recognised as human beings, not as blacks, we want to be a race, because we are human beings also – colours only run skin deep...". She said that she intended to call her next film Aboriginal Awakening.

Coffey gave a copy of My Survival as an Aboriginal to Queen Elizabeth II as a gift at the opening of Australia's new Parliament House in 1988. It won the Greater Union Award for documentary film and the Rouben Mamoulian Award at the Sydney Film Festival 1979.

The sequel, My Life as I Live It, was released in 1993. This film shows how the Community Development Employment Program was making a difference to Brewarrina.

=== Music ===
Coffey also wrote songs, releasing her first recording on a cassette tape, called "Number One", recorded in Adelaide on 12 March 1980 with "Bush Queen" on it. She entertained audiences by playing guitar and singing country and western songs. She won local and state competitions with her version of "Frankie and Johnny".

== Recognition ==
Coffey was nominated for an Member of the British Empire (MBE) but refused it, explaining "I knocked the MBE back because I'm not a member of the British Empire".

On 10 June 1985 she was awarded a Medal of the Order of Australia (OAM), in recognition of service to the Aboriginal community.

== Personal life ==
Coffey lived in Brewarrina for most of her life, after moving there in the 1950s with her husband, Albert "Doc" Coffey. They moved to the reserve at West Brewarrina, known as "Dodge City", in 1969, and together raised eight children, adopted ten more, and looked after other children from time to time. Lauren Coffey is her second eldest child.

She felt pain for the loss of her traditional lands, which led to alcohol abuse during some periods of her life, which she did not conceal.

In later life she suffered from kidney disease, with her struggle documented in Darrin Ballangarry's 2002 short film Big Girls Don't Cry, which featured three Aboriginal women with renal failure. The title of the film was an affirmation used by her own family in the film, and the film was produced by CAAMA Productions. The film was made for series 3 of Australia by Numbers, a TV series commissioned by SBS Television in collaboration with state agencies featuring short films by emerging filmmakers from South Australia, the Northern Territory, New South Wales, Queensland, Western Australia, Tasmania, and Victoria.

== Death and legacy ==
Coffey died of a common cold, owing to her immune system having been weakened by kidney failure, on 3 January 1998, aged 56. After her death, her family started crowdfunding for a life-sized statue and a memorial garden to be erected in her honour in Brewarrina.
