= For Love or Money (1983 film) =

- Directed by: Megan McMurchy, Margot Nash, Margot Oliver, Jeni Thornley
- Narrated by: Noni Hazlehurst
- Cinematography: Erika Addis
- Music by: Elizabeth Drake
- Production company: Flashback Films
- Release date: 1983

For Love or Money is a 1983 documentary which investigates role of Australian women for over 200 years in both paid and unpaid work. It is compiled using almost entirely historical material.

A copy is kept in the Australian National Film and Sound Archive. A pictorial history book is also available.

== Plot ==
There are three film clips available:

- First women's union
- Equal pay paradox
- A very efficient secretary

== Awards and recognition ==
- Best Feature Documentary, International Cinema del Cinema delle Donne, Florence, 1984
- Nominated for both Best Documentary and Best Screenplay, Australian Film Institute Awards, 1984
- Highly Commended United Nations Media Peace Prize, 1985

== Pictorial book ==
A companion book to the film titled For Love or Money - a pictorial history of women and work by filmmaker-authors Megan McMurchy, Margot Oliver and Jeni Thornley was published in the same year. This project arose out of the 1977 Women’s Film Production Workshop and the 1978 inaugural Women and Labour Conference. It involved interviews with many women and research into hundreds of feature films, documentaries, home movies, commercials and news reels and effectively revealed the working lives of Australian women. Feminist and union activist, Edna Ryan, who had been instrumental in achieving equal pay for women, also made editorial contributions to both the film and book. The film has been digitised and was screened at the 2017 Sydney Film Festival when it was hailed as "a major work of historical research, a masterclass of montage editing and a classic essay film."
