= Jeni Thornley =

Australian feminist documentary filmmaker

Jeni Thornley is an Australian feminist documentary filmmaker and writer. Since leaving her job as manager of the Women's Film Fund at the Australian Film Commission in 1986, Thornley has worked as an independent writer, director, and producer at Anandi Films. She has fulfilled teaching roles at University of Technology Sydney (UTS) and the Australian Film, Television and Radio School. Thornley was an honorary research associate in the Faculty of Arts and Social Sciences at UTS, and a consultant film valuer for the Cultural Gifts Program in the Dept of Communications and the Arts.

== Career ==
According to Collins (1998), Thornley "belongs to a 1960s generation of New Left filmmakers whose revived historical consciousness was germinated during the Cold War years in the silent fallout from Hiroshima". Born in Tasmania where her father was a film exhibitor, Thornley gained a degree in literature and political science at Monash University in Melbourne in 1969. After moving to Sydney she worked as an actor in experimental theatre and was active in the Women's Liberation Movement, Sydney Women's Film Group (SWFG), the Sydney Filmmakers Co-operative, and the Feminist Film Workers Collective, along with cinematographer Martha Ansara, Margot Nash, and others. As a member of SWFG, Thornley appeared in and worked on the production of the 1973 film, A Film for Discussion. The title reflects the group's wish "to distinguish it from films where the audience members were merely passive consumers of entertainment".

Thornley was one of the organisers of the International Women’s Year Film Festival in 1975, the first of its kind in Australia. As an active member of feminist collectives until the early 1980s, she was involved in a range of exhibition, distribution and publishing activities as well as working as a camera assistant on independent film productions.

In 1978 Thornley released her first film, the 27½ minute Maidens. The first two parts look at the lives of Thornley's mother, grandmother and great-grandmother through archival photographs and interviews. The second two parts show her own life in film, combining family photographs with feminist material of the 1970s. The film received funding from the Australian Film Commission. "It remains essential viewing for an enhanced understanding of the moment of awakened consciousness that characterised 1970s feminism." The film also acts as a short history of "the Anglo-Celtic 'diaspora' in Australia."

In 1983 Thornley coproduced with Megan McMurchy, Margot Oliver and Margot Nash the film, For Love or Money. The film had its roots back in 1977, when Thornley and the others decided to start working on the documentary. In addition, Thornley coordinated the collection of all the photographic material used for the companion book, jointly written with Megan McMurchy and Margot Oliver, For Love or Money, a Pictorial History of Women and Work in Australia, published by Penguin Books Australia in 1983 (ISBN 0140064443) .

Island Home Country – documentary and exegesis – (2009) was the culmination of Thornley's research for which she received a PhD from University of Technology, Sydney. The documentary screened nationally on ABC1 and ABC2 in June and July 2009.

Collins (1998) has stated that "Thornley's personal films (Maidens and To the Other Shore) and her social action films (A Film for Discussion and For Love or Money) are landmark films in the history of Australian feminist cinema over the last three decades". To the Other Shore explores death and motherhood through the narration of the fairy tale, Hansel and Gretel.

In 2003, Thornley joined other documentary-makers, including Martha Ansara, Pat Fiske, and Mitzi Goldman, in forming Ozdox, the Australian Documentary Forum.

== Filmography ==
Year	Title	Length	Role	Awards
1973	A Film for Discussion	24 mins	Cast member, co-producer	Finalist, Greater Union Awards, 1973
1978	Maidens	27.5 mins	Producer and director	Best Film, General Section, GUO Awards, Sydney Film Festival, 1978; Gold Hugo: Best Short Film, Chicago Film Festival, 1979; Diploma of Merit, Melbourne Film Festival, 1979; Flaherty Documentary Seminar, 1979
1983	For Love or Money	109 mins	Coproducer with Megan McMurchy, Margot Oliver and Margot Nash	Best Feature Documentary, International Cinema del Cinema delle Donne, Florence, 1984; Nomination for Best Screenplay, Best Documentary, AFI Awards, 1984; Highly Commended, United Nations Association of Australia Media Peace Prize, 1985
1988	Australia Daze	75.5 mins	Segment director	Best Editing, Australian Film Institute Awards
1996	To the Other Shore	54 mins	Writer and director; and coproducer with Lilias Fraser and Moya Iceton	Nominated for 1996 AWGIE awards for Best Documentary Script, Australian Writers Guild, and Best Music Score in a Documentary, Australian Guild of Screen Composers
2009	Island Home Country	52 mins	Writer, director and narrator	Nominated Best Achievement in Sound – Documentary, ASSG Awards 2008 High Commendation UTS Reconciliation Award, UTS Human Rights Awards 2008

== Publications ==
- For Love or Money : A pictorial history of women and work in Australia, co-written with Megan McMurchy and Margot Oliver, Penguin, 1983, ISBN 0140064443

=== Chapters contributed ===
- "Past, Present and Future: The Women's Film Fund", in Don't Shoot Darling!: Women's Independent Filmmaking in Australia, edited by Annette Blonski, Barbara Creed, Freda Freiberg, Greenhouse Publications, 1987, ISBN 0864360584
- "Through A Glass Darkly: Meditations on Cinema, Psychoanalysis and Feminism", in Womenvision : Women and the moving image in Australia, edited by Lisa French, Damned Publishing, 2003, ISBN 1876310014
- "Island Home Country: Working with Aboriginal protocols in a documentary film about colonisation and growing up white in Tasmania," chapter 13. in Passionate Histories: Myth, Memory and Indigenous Australia, edited by Frances Peters-Little, Ann Curthoys, and John Docker, ANU E Press, 2010, ISBN 9781921666643
