= My Survival as an Aboriginal =

1979 Australian documentary film

My Survival as an Aboriginal is a 1979 Australian documentary film directed by Essie Coffey, and produced by Coffey, Alec Morgan, and Martha Ansara. It was the first documentary directed by an Aboriginal woman, and was screened at several international film festivals, winning awards at some of them. The central themes of the film include Indigenous land rights in Australia, and the determination not to assimilate into white Australian culture, but to keep Aboriginal culture alive. A sequel, My Life as I Live It, was released in 1993. My Survival as an Aboriginal continues to be screened at international film festival retrospectives and themed series, as well as at local venues and on television in Australia.

== Synopsis ==
Coffey relates what happened to her people who lived in West Brewarrina (aka "Dodge City"), an area of Brewarrina, New South Wales. Romaine Moreton of the National Film and Sound Archive wrote of the film:

Essie Coffey's passion for her culture and her stoic dedication to her people is tangible in this film. As a charismatic, dedicated woman, she invites the audience into her community. And while she brings to the fore the hardships endured by her community, she is continually focused on the power and richness of traditional knowledge and skills, and the power of her cultural connection to land. In this, Coffey not only raises issues of the impact of colonisation on Indigenous peoples, but also offers a solution by way of continuing cultural practice... My Survival as an Aboriginal, though a call to justice, is also tempered with beauty, and the audience is allowed to glimpse the private world of Essie Coffey and the people of Brewarrina.

In the film, she turns the camera on herself, and addresses the audience directly. Talking to children in the film, she says: "Most important that you kids just remember what you are, that you stand tall and you stand proud, on your own land what you’re standing now, and it is black land, Aboriginal land". There is also humour in the film.

Coffey's closing statement in the film is "I'm going to lead my own life, me and my family, and live off the land. I will not live a white-man way and that's straight from me, Essie Coffey".

== Cast ==
- Essie Coffey, as herself
- People of Brewarrina

== Production ==
My Survival as an Aboriginal was the first documentary film directed by an Aboriginal woman, and, according to Romaine Moreton "one of the first Australian films where an Indigenous Australian was directly involved in deciding how she and her community would be represented". It was directed by Essie Coffey, and co-produced by Coffey, Alec Morgan, and American Australian filmmaker Martha Ansara.

The film was funded by Australian Film Commission, and features songs sung by Coffey.

== Themes ==
The central theme of the film is Indigenous land rights in Australia, as well as the ongoing effects of colonialism and dispossession on Aboriginal people in Australia.

== Release and reception ==
Screened at the Sydney Film Festival, it won Best Documentary as well as the Rouben Mamoulian Award for Best Director. In Paris, it shared the Grand Prix at the Cinéma du Réel in 1980, and it was also awarded at the American Film Festival (Note: Unknown which festival this refers to.) and at the Chicago International Film Festival.

The film was broadcast on ABC Television in Australia and BBC Television in the UK.

== Ongoing impact ==
Coffey gave a copy of My Survival as an Aboriginal to Queen Elizabeth II as a gift at the opening of Australia's new Parliament House in 1988.

The film has also been used widely in Australian education. It has screened on National Indigenous Television several times, including as one of a collection of 17 titles curated by Wodi Wodi woman and NFSA senior manager Gillian Moody for NAIDOC Week in 2023 on the SBS on Demand platform.

In her essay "Blak women on screen", published in The Story of the Moving Image Online, curator Kate ten Buuren writes that Coffey "pav[ed] the way for future generations of documentary-makers and truth tellers. She overcame barriers that aimed to keep Aboriginal women silent and broke down stereotypes of what an Aboriginal woman is. In My Survival as an Aboriginal, Coffey spoke directly to the audience, abolishing the idea that Aboriginal women are docile, stoic, or in need of saving – she staunchly advocates that Aboriginal people can take care of Aboriginal affairs, and takes pride in her culture. No longer were we being spoken about, and not to."

It was again screened as part of the "Feminism and film retrospective" in the 2017 Sydney Film Festival.

In July 2022, My Survival as an Aboriginal featured in a series screened at the Museum of the Moving Image in New York City, called Pioneering Women in Australian Cinema, along with films by Gillian Armstrong and Jane Campion as well as films by Indigenous, Asian, and queer filmmakers whose work is rarely shown in the United States. Devika Girish wrote in The New York Times: "Made one year before My Brilliant Career — and no less seminal than that film in inspiring an entire tradition of filmmakers — My Survival is both a personal manifesto by Coffey and an heirloom for her descendants".

It was selected as part of No Master Territories: Feminist Worldmaking and the Moving Image, an exhibition and film programme co-curated by Erika Balsom and Hila Peleg, "dedicated to works of nonfiction that invent new languages for the representation of gendered experience", and supported by the RBC Foundation. Its title originates from the work of Vietnamese writer and filmmaker Trinh T. Minh-ha. The exhibition comprised over 100 works, including around 20 films, and was first shown at the Haus der Kulturen der Welt in Berlin in 2022. The films were screened as a special event at the TIFF Lightbox in Toronto, preceded by Nice Coloured Girls by Tracey Moffatt, in March 2023, and the exhibition and programme toured to the Museum of Modern Art, Warsaw in summer 2023.

In November 2023 it was screened at the Artist Film Workshop in Melbourne, as a joint initiative with the NFSA.

== Sequel ==
The sequel, My Life as I Live It, was released in 1993. This film shows how the Community Development Employment Program was making a difference to people in Brewarrina.

The film was co-directed by Coffey, Ansara, and Kit Guyatt; co-written and produced by Coffey and Ansara; and executive produced by Rachel Perkins. It screened at the Creteil Festival de Femmes, Margaret Mead Film and Video Festival, and the Leipzig International Festival of Documentary and Animation Films.
