= Ron Johanson =

Australian director and cinematographer (1949–2025)

Ron Johanson OAM ACS
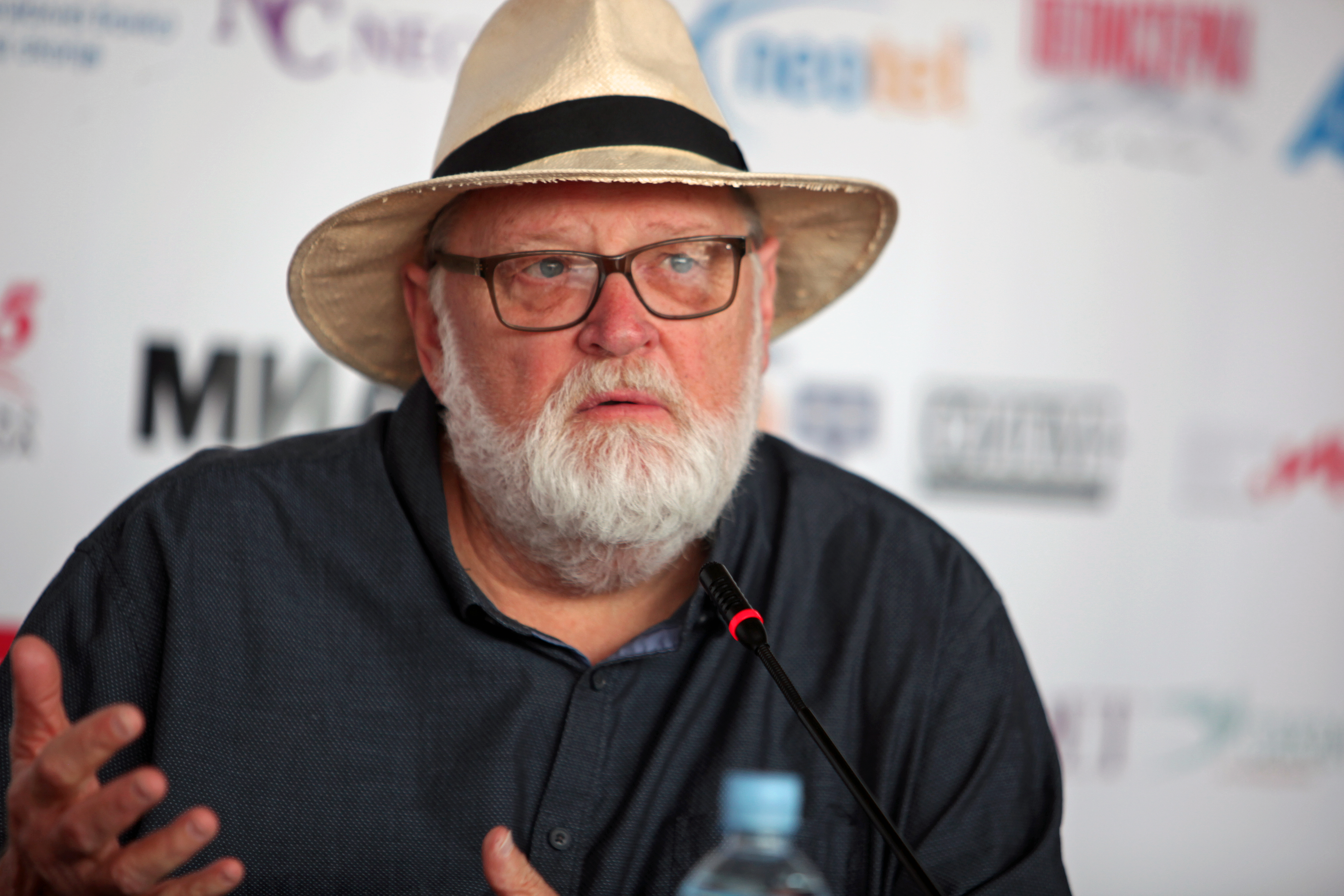
- Johanson in 2019
- Born: Ronald Geoffery Johanson; 3 September 1949; Melbourne, Victoria, Australia
- Died: 28 June 2025 (aged 75)
- Occupations: Director; Cinematographer

Ronald Geoffery Johanson OAM (3 September 1949 – 28 June 2025) was an Australian director and cinematographer who was the National President of the Australian Cinematographers Society (ACS) from 2008 to 2022. He was one of the most popular and awarded directors and cinematographers in Australia. He was awarded a Medal of the Order of Australia (OAM) on 26 January 2014 for his services to the arts, particularly as a cinematographer and film director.

== Life and career ==
Johanson started his career as a camera assistant on the television series Homicide and Hunter. He went freelance, and gained experience assisting the leading Melbourne cinematographers of the day. Johanson then joined Fred Schepisi's Film House as an assistant cameraman. Johanson returned to Senior Films and was promoted to Director of Photography for 34 episodes of the TV drama series Ryan.

Johanson shot and directed hundreds of television commercials, music videos and documentaries and was Director of Photography on the feature film Final Cut produced by Mike Williams. Scott Hicks chose Johanson as Director of Photography for his feature film Freedom. He then shot second unit on The Mango Tree and The Odd Angry Shot.

Johanson died on 28 June 2025, at the age of 75.

== Awards ==
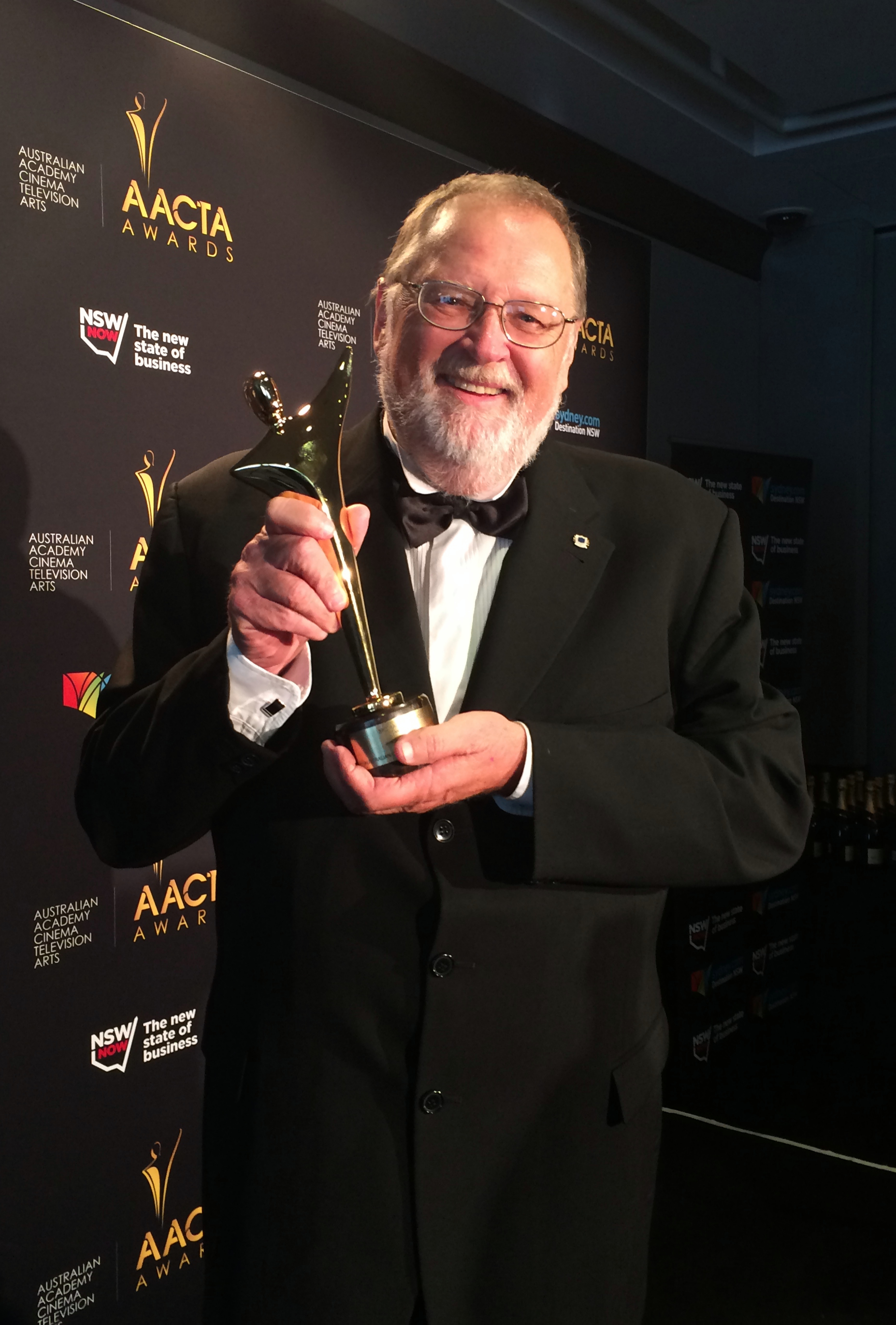
Johanson in 2014, accepting the AACTA Byron Kennedy Award on behalf of the ACS.

In 1999, Johanson was presented with a special Kodak Award for his services to the film industry. In 2004, he was inducted into the ACS Hall of Fame and in the same year received the Queensland New Filmmakers Kinetone Award for his contributions to the Queensland film industry. In 2009, he was inducted into the Queensland Advertising Hall of Fame. Over the years Johanson received numerous awards for his work, including:

- 4 New York Festival International Advertising Awards
- 3 Mobius Awards for Advertising
- 3 Gold ACS Awards (also 1 silver, 1 bronze)
- 2 Cannes Lions
- 2 Gold Tripods
- 1 special 'Kodak Award' for his services to the film industry
- 1 Queensland New Filmmakers 'Kinetone Award'
- 1 Order of Australia Medal
