= David Perry (Australian filmmaker) =

Australian experimental and underground filmmaker and video artist

- Born: 1933; Sydney, Australia
- Died: 15 April 2015 (aged 81–82); Sydney, Australia
- Known for: Experimental film, video art, animation, underground film

David Perry (1933 – 15 April 2015) was a pioneering Australian experimental and underground filmmaker, video artist, and a founding member of Ubu Films (1965). He also practised as a photographer, poster artist and painter.

During work on the production of The Theatre of Cruelty in Sydney, July 1965, he joined Albie Thoms, Aggy Read and others in establishing Ubu Films—named after Alfred Jarry's play Ubu Roi—the precursor of the Sydney Filmmakers Co-operative. This was Australia's first consciously avant-garde filmmaking group.

16mm experimental films include Walking (1955), The Tribulations of Mr Dupont Nomore (1967); Bolero (1967); A Sketch of Abigayl's Belly (1968); David Perry's Album (1970) and Adam (1975). Ubu Films 1965–70 a retrospective video compilation, was released in 1997. Refracting Glasses (1992) is a 109-minute feature film which "uses a range of techniques (actuality and staged footage, optical effects, animation) in an essay-like construction on the theme of the historical status of the artist invoking, amongst a diverse range of references, the Ern Malley hoax and the work of the Russian artist V. E. Tatlin.

== Biography ==
Poster designed by Perry for the 1969 Australian federal election

Perry underwent his primary and secondary education in Sydney during the 1940s. In 1949–54 he served a printing-trade apprenticeship, after which he worked for various printers and on farms in New Zealand.

In Sydney during the 1960s, he associated with the Sydney Push and developed as a painter, photographer and 8mm filmmaker. Prior to separation, he was married, with three children. He was employed by the Australian Broadcasting Commission in photographic positions and engaging privately in experimental film and video, and other artworks. It was during this time that he made the abstract videographic film Mad Mesh, and the controversial electoral poster featuring "a continuum of pigs (inspired by Orwell's Animal Farm)" with the slogan Whoever you vote for, a politician always gets in. His film, A Sketch on Abigayl's Belly which showed shots of a pregnant woman caused controversy when it was banned by the Commonwealth Film Censor in 1968 when the print returned from the International Short Film Festival Oberhausen. In 1970 Don Chipp, the Minister for Customs and Excise, in a conscious public gesture, overturned the banning of the film.

He travelled to Europe with his second wife and their child, from 1971 to 1974, lectured in film and video at Middlesex Polytechnic in London where he produced essay films such as Utopian Memory Banks Present Fragments from the Past and My Dutch Newsreel. Returning to Australia with his young daughter, he was artist-in-residence at Griffith University (1975–76) where he established a video studio and made works such as Interior with Views, and was lecturer in film and video at the Darling Downs Institute of Advanced Education (now the University of Southern Queensland).

He re-established in Sydney in 1980, being employed as a photographer and film/video producer for the NSW health authority and the Royal North Shore Hospital at St Leonards. Mosman Art Gallery presented Then and now and everything in between: The Art of David Perry, a retrospective of his painting, drawing, photography, film and video in 2009. His short auto-biographical film Album 1970 was screened at the Art Gallery of New South Wales, 2014, in conjunction with the exhibition Pop to Popism. Perry referred to many of his works as 'personal films', as opposed to commercial or genre production. Stephen Jones writes that 'Much of Perry's work turns on these aspects of video as mnemonic device reflecting his life and ideology'.
