= The Shadowcatchers =

Photographic history of Australian cinematography, published 2012

The Shadowcatchers: A history of cinematography in Australia
- First edition cover featuring Lacey Percival
- Author: Martha Ansara
- Illustrator: 380 photographs of cinematographers at work between 1901 and 2011
- Language: English
- Subject: Cinematography, Australia--History—Photographic works
- Genre: Australian cinematography, motion pictures
- Publisher: Austcine, Australian Cinematographers Society
- Publication date: May 2012
- Publication place: Australia
- Media type: Print (Hardback – limited collectors edition and Paperback)
- Pages: 288 (first edition, hardback)
- ISBN: 9780987225214

The Shadowcatchers: A history of cinematography in Australia is a photographic history of Australian cinematography, written by Martha Ansara and published by the Australian Cinematographers Society, which launched the project for its 50th anniversary in 2008.

== Summary ==
The Shadowcatchers documents the history of Australia's national cinema and the industrial practices and role of the cinematographer from the 1890s to 2011. The book contains excerpts of oral histories of cinematographers recorded for the National Film and Sound Archive of Australia discussing the nature of filmmaking under the impact of broader political, social and technological forces throughout Australian cinematic history, as well as photographs from Australian and international stills photographers.

The book was developed with input from veteran members of the Australian Cinematographers Society, creating a sense of an insiders’ view of what happens behind the camera. Themes include the changing culture and technology of Australian cinematography, the specific nature of the work, the importance of actuality and commercials production, international influences, relationships between cinematographers and directors, cast and crew, and the sorts of studios and locations where films have been made. Twenty-six biographies are also presented, covering early cinematographers such as the Burnes of Queensland, Academy Award Winners such as Dean Semler, Russell Boyd and John Seale, war correspondents Damien Parer and Neil Davis, and Movietone News cameraman Bill Trerise.

The Shadowcatchers has been published in two editions: a softcover edition and a hardback collectors edition, limited to 250 numbered copies and signed by the five living Australian winners of the Academy Award for cinematography, Dean Semler, John Seale, Andrew Lesnie, Russell Boyd and Dion Beebe.
