= Candy Regentag =

- Directed by: James Ricketson
- Written by: Don Catchlove
- Produced by: Don Catchlove; Graeme Isaac
- Starring: Patsy Stephen
- Edited by: Tony Stevens
- Music by: Phil Colson; Nigel Westlake
- Release date: 1989
- Running time: 101 minutes
- Country: Australia
- Language: English
- Budget: A$750,000

Candy Regentag, also known as Kiss the Night, is a 1989 Australian film directed by James Ricketson, about a young woman who works in a brothel.

== Cast ==
- Patsy Stephen as Candy
- Rainee Skinner as Flour
- Warwick Moss as Reg
- Maxine Klibingaitis as Bibi
- Gary Aron Cook as Ian
- Toni Scanlan as Gail
- John Polson as Cyril
- Arky Michael as Franky
- Imogen Annesley as Sascha
- Christopher Truswell as Leo

== Plot ==
Ex-art student Jenny (Patsy Stephen) works as a prostitute at Bambi's, a brothel in Sydney's Kings Cross, under the assumed name 'Candy Regentag'. She lives with her boyfriend Ian (Gary Aron Cook), a no-hoper musician, who squanders Candy's earnings on drugs.

One night, leaving Bambi's, Candy encounters the enigmatic Reg (Warwick Moss). As she gets to know Reg, who is vastly different to Ian, Candy is drawn to his charisma. She finds herself falling in love with him and sees a future with him where she will no longer need to work at Bambi's. Reg, however, has other ideas, wanting to retain a service-client relationship.

Candy ends her relationship with Ian, before realising that the reality of her future with Reg is less than ideal, a revelation that culminates in a fatal stabbing.

== Production ==
The film, directed by James Ricketson and produced by Don Catchlove and Graeme Isaac with Rainy Day Productions, was fully funded by the Australian Film Commission. It was shot on 16mm in Kings Cross, Sydney during August and September 1986. Much of the film was shot in a brothel constructed for the film.

The film was composer and conductor Nigel Westlake's first film score.

== Release ==
The film took two years to get a cinema release. After being completed in 1988 it had an initial release in the United States on 3 August 1988, before being officially released on 24 June 1989 in Australia.

Director, James Ricketson later said:

It was a story about a difficult kind of love between a man and a woman that happens to take place in the context of a brothel. But the same relationship could easily have taken place elsewhere. The man is incapable of making any kind of emotional commitment to the woman. The film was not hugely successful and I suppose I don't really think about it very much now. It's probably not a great film, but it's all right.

The film screened at Rivertown International Film Festival in 1989.

== Reception ==
David Stratton of At the Movies review for Variety read: "This rather bleak, but quite gripping, drama... makes for a modestly effective film which, if it gets upbeat reviews, could work in selected venues in most large cities." and "Patsy Stephen gives a powerful performance as Candy, her looks and style reminiscent at times of Judy Davis."

Peter Crayford of the Australian Financial Review said: "Candy Regentag manages to avoid both the salacious and the sensational in dealing with life in a Kings Cross brothel. Its drama comes from the genuineness of its characterisations. It is a bold attempt at a contemporary suspense drama."

== See also ==
- Cinema of Australia
