= Staniforth Ricketson =

Australian businessman and politician

Staniforth Ricketson DCM
- Born: 1 August 1891; Malvern, Victoria, Australia
- Died: 6 December 1967 (aged 76); Kew, Victoria, Australia
- Education: Wesley College, Melbourne
- Known for: "one of Australia's greatest financiers"
- Spouses: Mary Brown (m. 1916; div. 1945) Edna Holmes (m. 1946)

Staniforth Ricketson DCM (1 August 1891 – 6 December 1967) was an Australian stockbroker, financier, and political figure.

== Early life ==
Ricketson was born in Malvern, Victoria, to Sophia Henrietta (née Sheppard) and Henry Joseph Ricketson. He was named after his paternal grandmother Georgina Staniforth. He had ties to stockbroker Jonathan Binns Were on both sides of his family – Were was his mother's maternal grandfather and his father's step-grandfather.

== Education ==
Ricketson attended Prahran North State School, where he was dux in 1905. He subsequently attended Wesley College for two years on scholarships, before leaving school in 1907. He worked as a jackaroo for a period and then became a correspondence clerk with the Australian Mercantile Land & Finance Company. In 1909, Ricketson moved to King Island with his brother Lancelot. They ran the Ricketson Bros. general store and Staniforth edited The King Islander, a local newspaper. The following year he became a reporter for the North Western Advocate and Emu Bay Times.

=== World War I ===
Ricketson enlisted in the Australian Imperial Force (AIF) in August 1914, as a private in the 5th Battalion. He took part in the landing at Anzac Cove on 25 April 1915 and was awarded the Distinguished Conduct Medal (DCM) for his leadership that day, after all the officers and NCOs in his company became casualties. He was commissioned as a lieutenant on 27 April, and later mentioned in despatches. Ricketson received a glancing bullet wound in June 1915 and a shell blast in August left him partially deaf. He was evacuated to England for health reasons in October, and returned to Australia on leave in February 1916. He arrived back in England in September and was promoted captain in January 1917, subsequently serving on the Western Front.

== Business career ==
Ricketson had joined the family stockbroking business JBWere in 1911 and was admitted as a partner in 1914. After the war, the firm consolidated its market share and in 1928 established Were's Investment Trust Ltd, which later became the Australian Foundation Investment Company (AFIC). The firm also backed the National Reliance Investment Company in 1929, the Capel Court Investment Trust in 1936, and the Jason Investment Trust in 1937; its holdings became known as the Capel Court group of companies. Ricketson's firm promoted and underwrote share offerings for many large companies. From 1936 to 1939 he chaired the holding company for The Argus and The Australasian. His career extended into the 1950s and 1960s.

By the time of Ricketson's death, JB Were had a staff of over 400 people and turnover in the hundreds of millions of dollars. He began a weekly sharemarket letter, expanded the brokerage interstate and opened a London office, and was a strong proponent of business ethics, opposing insider trading through a "rigid, underlined and emphasised insistence that share brokers could not be share traders".

== Politics ==
Ricketson came to prominence politically during the Great Depression as an opponent of default on national debt and supporter of debt restructuring (known as "loan conversion" at the time). In late 1930, he and his friend Robert Menzies assisted the loan conversion campaign that acting treasurer Joseph Lyons had initiated to allow Australia to meet its obligations to international financiers. At the time, Lyons was a member of the Australian Labor Party (ALP). Ricketson had "grown increasingly impatient with the dysfunction of Labor's caucus through 1930". He became the leader of the so-called "Group of Six" (or simply "The Group") which helped convince Lyons to leave the ALP and eventually become the figurehead of the anti-Labor United Australia Party (UAP). Ricketson had first met Lyons while in Tasmania in 1911. The Group met with Lyons regularly in early 1931 and became "the spine that held the diverse groups together to create the UAP". In May 1931, Ricketson became the temporary secretary of the central council of the UAP's Victorian section. After Lyons led the UAP to victory at the 1931 election, the Group's influence declined and Ricketson was one of the only members to remain close with the new prime minister.

Ricketson was a strong advocate of separating the Commonwealth Bank's central banking and commercial banking functions. According to the Australian Dictionary of Biography, "the establishment of the Reserve Bank of Australia in 1959 has been attributed in part to his influence and persistence".

== Personal life ==
Ricketson married Mary Gwendolyn Brown in April 1916, while home on medical leave from the army. The couple had six children together, before divorcing in 1945. Ricketson remarried in October 1946 to his secretary Edna Letitia Holmes, with whom he had another two children. His grandson is film director James Ricketson.

Ricketson died at his home in Kew on 6 December 1967, aged 76. His estate was valued for probate at $1,994,720 (equivalent to $28,450,000 in 2022).
