= Third Person Plural =

- Directed by: James Ricketson
- Written by: James Ricketson
- Starring: Bryan Brown; Martha Ansara
- Release date: 1978
- Running time: 92 minutes
- Country: Australia
- Language: English
- Budget: AU$30,000

Third Person Plural is a 1978 film directed by James Ricketson and starring Bryan Brown.

The script was devised by the actors and director in a workshop. Cinematographer Martha Ansara also appears in the film.

Ricketson has since called the film an "experiment":

I just wanted to see whether it would be possible to make a film on that small budget, shoot the whole thing with a hand-held camera, integrate improvised dialogue with scripted dialogue, work with a small core of actors on a character-based piece, which is what I did, and then to approach the editing of the film in an innovative way. Now, I happen not to like the film myself. Having done the film - it was fun to do it - I decided that I didn't like it, and it certainly wasn't the direction that I wanted to go in.
