= Australian Directors' Guild =

Industry association for screen directors

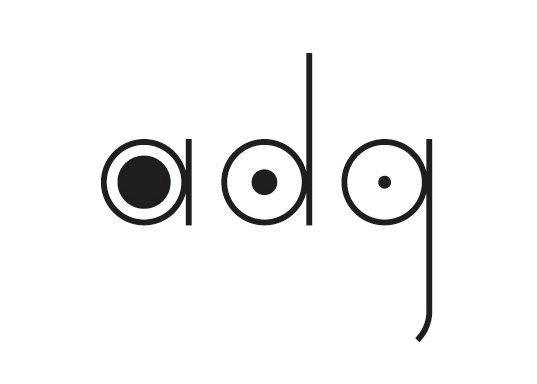
- Founded: 1981
- Headquarters: Australian Directors' Guild National Office; Suite 28/330-370 Wattle Street; Ultimo, NSW 2007, NSW Australia
- Members: ▼591 (as at 31 December 2024)
- Key people: Rowan Woods, President; Alaric McAusland, Executive Director
- Website: adg.org.au

The Australian Directors' Guild (ADG) is an industry guild representing the interests of film, television, commercials and digital media directors, including documentary makers and animators, throughout Australia. With its headquarters in Sydney, the ADG has branches in New South Wales, Queensland, South Australia, Victoria, and Western Australia. As of 2022 the president of ADG is Rowan Woods.

Founded initially as the Australian Feature Film Directors' Association in September, 1981 and renamed the Australian Screen Directors' Association (ASDA) four months later, the organisation became the Australian Directors' Guild in 2007 in order to align itself more clearly to other international directors guilds which had for some years been strengthening their ties with each other and with their Australian counterpart. In 2014, the ADG membership voted unanimously for constitutional changes to enable the Guild to register as a trade union under Australia's federal Industrial Relations Act 1988. In February, 2015 registration as an industrial organisation was approved by the Fair Work Commission.

== Overview ==
The ADG is a craft association representing screen directors working in all genres. It seeks to promote excellence in screen direction through seminars, conferences, workshops and awards, to encourage communication and collaboration between directors and others in the industry, to provide professional support for its members, to represent the interests of directors in cultural and policy debates and decisions and to play a constructive role in matters affecting the Australian screen industry as a whole.

The ADG is governed by a board of directors, elected from and by the membership, and appoints a full-time executive director and a coordinator.

The ADG provides members with information, access, professional advice and advocacy relating to issues that affect directors – such as contracts, fees, codes of practice, rights and disputes. It maintains and provides connections with overseas Guilds through its affiliation with the International Association of English Speaking Directors Organisations (IAESDO).

The Guild organises a Directors Attachment Scheme in cooperation with Screen Australia whereby successful applicants are placed in productions in order to gain experience working in film or television. Beginning in 1993, the ADG has held regular directors conferences and between 1988 and 2008, it printed a newsletter which later became the magazine, Screen Director. Current issues of Screen Director are available online.

In 2007 the ADG began giving annual awards for directors. These have grown to include 17 categories with special awards recognising service and achievement.

Ozdox, a semi-autonomous documentary group affiliated with the ADG and working closely with Guild staff, fosters and promotes documentary culture, primarily through discussion screenings and seminars. Founded in 2003, Ozdox encourages documentary directors to become members of the ADG.

In 1995 the ADG formed the Australian Screen Directors Authorship Collecting Society (ASDACS) to collect overseas royalties for distribution to Australian and New Zealand directors

As of 2014, the ADG had a membership of over 700, including full/retired members, associate members and student members. Full members must be refereed and their credentials approved by the ADG Board. Membership fees are determined according to annual wage levels and state location.

Guild Chapters in New South Wales, Queensland, South Australia, Victoria and Western Australia organise a range of local events and activities and liaise with their relevant State screen bodies. The staff and operations of the Guild are financed through fees for membership, income from events, a small percent of overseas royalties collected through ASDACS, a voluntary levy from the budgets of members' productions and sponsorship from state and federal film bodies, Screenrights and Media Super.

== History ==
=== 1981 – 1991 ===
In early 1981, a meeting of film directors was held in response to plans to import an overseas director for Hoodwink, a feature film financed by Australian taxpayers through the New South Wales Film Corporation. The meeting held the view that the development of Australian directors was a key part of the rationale for government funding of films. Failing to gain support for their opposition from the relevant industry union, the Australian Theatrical & Amusement Employees Association (AT&AEA), the directors decided to set up the Australian Feature Film Directors Association. In around September 1981, 18 directors met at the AT&AEA headquarters in the Sydney suburb of Glebe to sign the Articles of Association. Nine directors were the formal signatories: Gillian Armstrong, James Ricketson, Esben Storm, Albie Thoms, Henri Safran, Keith Salvat, Tom Jeffrey, Carl Schultz and Michael Pate.

The organisation soon attracted interest from directors other than feature film directors, especially from television directors, leading to the decision to change its name to the Australian Screen Directors Association (ASDA). New signatories to the ASDA Articles of Association on 15 January 1982 included Phillip Noyce and Stephen Wallace and a number of directors best known for their television work: John Power, Maurice Murphy, Peter Maxwell, Ron Way and Ian Barry.

In the years that followed, ASDA continued to concern itself with the importation of overseas directors, supporting directors of note and where Australian directors were also included in the projects. A range of cultural events, meetings and seminars were organized and, as membership grew, membership fees enabled the employment of a manager. Attempts at instituting a standard directors contract proved fruitless as the Screen Producers Association of Australia (SPAA) refused to negotiate, citing ASDA's lack of industrial registration as its reason. Nevertheless, in 1985 a disputes committee was formed and ASDA continued to represent directors in disputes with producers.

ASDA Board meetings were initially held in members' houses or at an industry watering hole, the 729 Club, until 1984 by which time income had increased sufficiently for the establishment of an office in the suburb of Glebe. In 1985, with the admission of documentary directors, membership reached 100, but the influence of ASDA through its various activities reached many more directors as well as others interested/involved in film and television production. These cultural events also became a source of finance.

As the organization developed further, eventually including membership in other capital cities, the Australian Film Commission (AFC) began to give financial support to ASDA's cultural events and seminars. Correlatively, with the growth of membership and establishment of a financial base, ASDA was able to play a role in the politics of the industry. Lobbying on behalf of directors' viewpoints on a range of issues soon became one of the Association's primary activities.

=== 1992 – 1999 ===
By 1992 ASDA membership was around 200 and, as activity within the organisation increased, this number soon doubled. By the end of the decade, members numbered almost 900, including both associate and student members.

During the 1990s, members participated directly in the Association through a range of committees including a documentary committee, an animators committee, a television directors committee, a women's committee, events committee and policy committee, among others. President Stephen Wallace, in revitalising ASDA, recognised the members' interest in the art/craft of directing and proposed the institution of a Directors Conference and Directors Discussion Screenings. Many such screenings were held over the following years, along with a range of seminars and meetings to discuss industry policy.

ASDA's first National Directors Conference was held in June 1993. Over the next years, these conferences coincided with ASDA's AGM and became forums for policy debate as well as for exploration of directing issues.

During this period also, ASDA continued its participation in industry policy development with submissions to and meetings with relevant organisations, reviews and government departments. Work on a Standard TV directors contract was begun and a reconstituted Disputes Committee began life by dealing with a serious television dispute arising in some measure out of the lack of such a contract. Other disputes continued to be brought to the committee by directors working in many areas of the industry. In 1999, one of these disputes, with Channel 9 over wages for directors on the Far Scape series, brought the long-simmering issue of industrial representation to the fore. President Stephen Wallace vigorously rejected the view that ASDA should work through the industry union, the Media, Entertainment & Arts Alliance (MEAA) but rather that it should itself seek industrial registration.

ASDA's efforts to develop standard directors' contracts continued and in 1999 Neil Haggquist, the business agent for the Directors Guild of Canada (DGC) was brought to Australia to help develop a contract which would be acceptable both to Australian and US companies. Also in this period a prolonged struggle to achieve Moral Rights for directors was initiated when both federal government film agencies, the Australian Film Commission and the Film Finance Corporation Australia, as well as the Australian Writers Guild came out in opposition to the inclusion of directors as authors in mooted changes to the Copyright law of Australia.

ASDA understood that the authorship of screen directors was not well-recognised and was under additional threat in a changing global and technological landscape. As a consequence, many of its activities at this time were aimed at fostering a better understanding of the director's role. Thanks to these efforts, when Moral Rights legislation was introduced into the Copyright Act in 2000, directors were defined as makers of a film along with writers and producers. Importantly, with the subsequent passing of the 2006 Copyright Amendment Act, ASDA and the Australian Writers Guild, now working together, managed to achieve protection for their members from contractual pressures to waive their moral rights – a waiver which is permitted and widely exercised in some other jurisdictions, notably in the United States.

In 1994, ASDA President Stephen Wallace, at the invitation of the late John Juliani the DGC (Directors Guild of Canada), met in Toronto with the DGA (Directors Guild of America) and BECTU (Britain's Broadcasting, Entertainment, Cinematograph and Theatre Union), thus beginning a process of achieving closer relationships with overseas guilds. Subsequently, ASDA regularly participated in the annual International Directors' Guild Forum, an event which it hosted in Sydney in 1998.

Similarly in 1995, ASDA formed ASDACS (the Australian Directors Collecting Society) after having been approached by the Société des Auteurs et Compositeurs Dramatiques to distribute money collected on behalf of directors from the sale of video tapes in France. ASDACS subsequently formed further relationships with other European collecting societies and in recent years has distributed roughly half a million dollars annually to its 800 director members in Australia and New Zealand.

In 1999, ASDA made further gains for directors in arguing for their inclusion as beneficiaries under the retransmission scheme proposed in the Copyright Amendment (Digital Agenda) Act (2000). These efforts came to fruition in 2005 through the Copyright Amendment (Film Directors' Rights) Act, providing for film directors to share in retransmission royalties along with producers in certain cases.

=== 2000 – 2014 ===
By the end of the 1990s, political, social and technological changes were resulting in a diminution of member involvement in many organizations across Australia and ASDA was not immune to these changes. Most of the member committees of the earlier period had become inactive, members meetings became infrequent, and most of the work fell to active members of the board—particularly successive association presidents Donald Crombie and Ray Argall—and to the executive directors: Richard Harris (1998-2007), Drew Macrae (2007-2009), In 2009–2011, the ADG also employed an industrial relations and policy manager, Needeya Islam. Much of their time was claimed by industrial issues, international relations and the necessity of participation in a large number of policy debates and reviews of public sector institutions and regulations, with their attendant demands for consultations, participation in industry committees and detailed submissions.

In this period also, digital media became an increasingly significant area of concern as rapid transformations affected telecommunications, television and "film" which was increasingly moving away from celluloid formats.

In 2007, the association changed its name to the Australian Directors' Guild (ADG). ADG President Ray Argall became involved in the work of the Australian Screen Council, an initiative intended to bring together Australian screen industry guilds. Argall also represented Australia in the founding of the International Federation of Coalitions for Cultural Diversity in Seville in 2007. He subsequently served as the Asia-Pacific member of the federation's board and coordinated the Australian Coalition for Cultural Diversity.

It was in this period also that the ADG finalised rate cards for directors' fees. And while directors' contracts had also been drafted, the ability to negotiate with producers for their implementation still remained a stumbling block. In 2014, following discussions with MEAA and SPAA, the ADG received unanimous support from its members for the constitutional changes necessary for registration as an industrial union.

The ADG continued to maintain a focus on directors' creative and craft issues through seminars and discussion screenings in capital cities, at its national conference, and in collaboration with a range of other industry organisations, educational institutions and film festivals.

== Awards ==
At the 1995 conference, ASDA presented the first Cecil Holmes Award in recognition of services to directing.

=== Cecil Holmes Award ===
- 1995 Richard Mason
- 1996 Gil Brealey
- 1997 Freda Glynn, Phillip Batty
- 1999 Lilias Fraser
- 2001 Tim Burstall
- 2002 Michael Thornhill
- 2003 John Flaus
- 2004 Amanda Higgs
- 2005 John Maynard
- 2006 Rolf de Heer
- 2007 Donald Crombie
- 2008 Tom Zubrycki
- 2009 Paul Cox
- 2011 Sally Riley, Erica Glynn
- 2012 Stephen Wallace
- ?
- 2016 Lawyers Michael Frankel and Greg Duffy, for providing pro bono services to ADG members
- 2017 Courtney Gibson
- 2018 Ray Argall
- 2022: Samantha Lang
- 2024: Robert Connolly

=== ADG Directors Awards ===
In 2007, the first ADG Directors Awards were established. They are open to financial members in all categories and are the only Australian film directing awards judged solely by directors. This was the year in which the ADG was first included in the Directors Finder Series by the Directors Guild of America. The DGA Finders Series spotlights the director of an undistributed independent film chosen from member countries within the International Association of English-Speaking Directors Organizations (IAESDO). The Finder's Award was relaunched by the ADG in 2012, and in 2014 an Innovation Award was also established.

In 2018, Larissa Behrendt won "Best Direction of a Documentary Feature Film" for After the Apology, which was partly funded by the Adelaide Film Festival's Indigenous Feature Documentary Initiative.

In May 2019, ten awards were presented, as well as the top prize of Best Direction in a Feature Film, which Warwick Thornton won for Sweet Country. Another major winner was Rachel Perkins, with Mystery Road, Series.

== Presidents ==
- 1981–82 Gillian Armstrong
- 1982–85 Phillip Noyce
- 1986 Chris Thompson (for eight months)
- 1987–89 Chris Noonan
- 1989–90 Graham Thorburn
- 1991 Roger Hudson
- 1992–2001 Stephen Wallace
- 2001–06 Donald Crombie
- 2006–15 Ray Argall
- 2015–December 2021 Samantha Lang
- December 2021–present (as of 2022) Rowan Woods
