= JBWere =

Investment Management (e. 1840)

- Formerly: Goldman Sachs JBWere
- Company type: Public
- Traded as: ASX: NAB
- Industry: Investment management
- Founded: 1840
- Founder: Jonathan Binns Were
- Headquarters: Australia
- Area served: Melbourne Sydney Canberra Brisbane Adelaide Perth Auckland Christchurch Wellington
- Services: Wealth management Securities research Alternative investment Fixed income
- AUM: ▲AUD$61.2 billion (2024)
- Number of employees: 500-1000
- Parent: National Australia Bank
- Website: www.jbwere.com.au

JBWere is an Australian investment management firm. It was founded in Melbourne in 1840 by Jonathan Binns Were.

Staniforth Ricketson, a descendant of Were, was made a partner in J. B. Were & Son Ltd in 1914 and eventually became sole proprietor. Under Ricketson, the firm consolidated its market share, promoting and underwriting share offerings for many large companies. In 1928, the firm established Were's Investment Trust Ltd, which later became the Australian Foundation Investment Company (AFIC). The firm also backed the National Reliance Investment Company in 1929, the Capel Court Investment Trust in 1936, and the Jason Investment Trust in 1937; its holdings became known as the Capel Court group of companies. Ricketson expanded the firm interstate and opened a London branch; at the time of his death in 1967 the firm had over 400 employees.

In 2003, Goldman Sachs purchased a 45% shareholding in JBWere. In 2009, the National Australia Bank (NAB) acquired an 80% shareholding in the private wealth division, and moved to 100% in 2016. Around that time the firm was split; with the name 'JBWere' and the firm's retail brokering business being sold to the NAB. NAB completed its takeover of the relevant divisions in 2016.

Of the parts of the joint venture not sold to NAB, the remainder was acquired by Goldman Sachs in April 2011.
