= Peter Hardy (actor) =

Australian actor (1957–2023)

- Born: 11 January 1957; Perth, Western Australia, Australia
- Died: 16 March 2023 (aged 66); Fremantle, Western Australia, Australia
- Occupations: Actor, theatre performer, musician
- Years active: 1969–2023

Peter Hardy (11 January 1957 – 16 March 2023) was an Australian actor, theatre performer, and musician.

== Early life and career ==
Hardy was born in Perth, Western Australia on 11 January 1957. He began his music career in 1969 playing the French horn in the CCGS Orchestra. Hardy began his career on stage on the show "Revue - The Other Opening". Later, he played and sang in "An Officer And A Gentleman" in the Lyric Theatre in Sydney under the direction of Simon Phillips.

Hardy began his film career in 1986 with The Pursuit of Happiness, after which he played in a number of films, TV movies, TV series and shorts. In 1996, Hardy appeared in the Network 10 series Sweat. Between 2006 and 2009 he appeared in 44 episodes of McLeod's Daughters as Phil Rakich. In 2012, Hardy appeared in a television film, Dangerous Remedy, as Robbie McGregor.

== Death ==
Hardy died while snorkelling at South Beach in Fremantle, Western Australia, on 16 March 2023. He was 66.

== Filmography ==
=== Film ===
Year	Title	Role	Notes
1986	The Pursuit of Happiness	John	Feature film
1988	Daisy and Simon (aka Where the Outback Ends)	Rowdy	Feature film
1990	Jackaroo	Ram Gallagher	TV movie
1990	Elvis Killed My Brother	Leon	Short film
1993	The Feds: Terror	Rory Hay	TV movie
1993	Desperate Journey: The Allison Wilcox Story	Chief Walpole	TV movie
1994	Baby Bath Massacre	Adrian's father	TV movie
1997	The Last of the Ryans	Woggsie	TV movie
1997	Fable	Mack	TV movie
1997	The Ripper	Patrician	Feature film
1999	Dead End	Det. Insp. Wolcott	Feature film
2000	Chopper	Detective Cooney	Feature film
2001	Chasing Rabbits	Nick	Short film
2008	Cane Cutter	Mr. Richmond (voice)	Short film
2012	Dangerous Remedy	Robbie McGregor	TV movie
2016	Hard Target 2	Jacob Zimling	Direct to video

=== Television ===
Year	Title	Role	Notes
1986	Prisoner	Dave Wilson	TV series, episode: #1.625
1992	Phoenix	Rocky Wilson	TV series, episode: "Snow Job"
1993	Stark	Lifesaver	TV series, episode: #1.1
1993	Snowy	Pokey	TV series
1993-1994	Time Trax	Dr. Keneally	TV series, episodes: "Little Boy Lost" & "Perfect Pair"
1994	A Country Practice	Steve Atkinson	TV series, episode: "The Grass Is Greener"
1994	Janus	Gavin Lindsay	TV series, episode: "Judgement Amongst Short Men"
1994-2005	Blue Heelers	Rob Cole / Colin Fraser / Hayden Benett / Mike Knights	TV series, 4 episodes: "Why Give People Rights? They Only Abuse Them", "A Question of Loyalties“, "Reality Bytes" & "Child's Play"
1995	The Man from Snowy River	Seb Holgate	TV series, episode: "Montana Territory". Also known in United States as "Snowy River: The McGregor Saga"
1995	Naked	Dennis "The Gorilla that took Manila" Gibson	TV series
1995	Halifax f.p.	Police Officer Tony Roman	TV series, episodes: "Hard Corps" & "Cradle and All"
1996	The Bite	Pete	TV series
1996	Naked: Stories of Men	Gibbo	TV series, episode: "Coral Island"
1996	Sweat	Sid O'Reilly	TV series, episodes: #1.1 - #1.26
1997	Good Guys, Bad Guys	Kirby	TV series, episode: "Return of the Phantom"
1997	State Coroner	Gary Turrell	TV series, episode: "Shortcut to Death"
1997	Neighbours	Jimmy Drane / Jimmy Draine	TV series, episodes: #1.2950, #1.2951 and #1.2976
1998	Wildside	Ewan Mancini	TV series, episode #1.34
1999	Stingers	Det. Insp. Ron Leighton	TV series, episodes: "Lone Hand", "Proving Ground", "Cast Off", "Dead Man's Throw" & "Swarm"
2000	Eugénie Sandler P.I.	Stokesy	TV series, episode #1.5
2006-2009	McLeod's Daughters	Phil Rakich	TV series, episodes: 143, 157, 159, 163, 166, 169, 180–184, 186–189, 191–199, 202–211, 213–220, 222 (also song performer), 224
2008	The Strip	Colin Tully	TV series, episode #1.10
2009	East West 101	Barry Hill	TV series, episode "Ice in the Veins"
2011	Rush	Doug Rainey	TV series, episodes: #4.6 - #4.9
