= Blackfellas =

- Directed by: James Ricketson
- Screenplay by: James Ricketson; Archie Weller
- Based on: Novel: Archie Weller
- Produced by: Paul D. Barron; Penny Chapman; David Rapsey
- Starring: John Moore; David Ngoombujarra; Jack Charles; John Hargreaves; Ernie Dingo
- Cinematography: Jeffrey Malouf
- Edited by: Christopher Cordeaux
- Music by: David Milroy
- Distributed by: Ronin Films
- Release date: 1993
- Running time: 95 minutes
- Country: Australia
- Language: English

Blackfellas is a 1993 Australian drama film directed by James Ricketson and starring John Moore, David Ngoombujarra, Jack Charles, John Hargreaves and Ernie Dingo. It is an adaptation of Archie Weller's 1981 novel The Day of the Dog. The film won two AFI Awards and had its premiere at the Valhalla Cinema in Melbourne on 26 August 1993.

== Plot ==
In Perth, Western Australia, Doug Dooligan (John Moore), a young Nyoongar man, is released from prison, where he was incarcerated for assault. Outside, he is picked up by his charismatic childhood friend Floyd "Pretty Boy" Davies (David Ngoombujarra), who was partially responsible for Doug's incarceration, and taken to a remote Aboriginal community in Western Australia. He becomes attracted to a local girl Polly (Jaylene Riley) and, upon learning that Floyd is still involved in criminal activities, decides to leave and visit his mother.

Determined to stay out of trouble, Doug buys back his father's old property, Yetticup, which has traditional roots. Polly joins him at Yetticup and not soon afterward, Doug's father reappears after he had escaped from prison. Doug narrowly escapes the police when his father is apprehended, and the latter dies in prison. Distraught, Doug meets Floyd, and the two become friends again. When Doug tries to stop Floyd from committing a crime, Floyd sacrifices his own life so that Doug can escape and avoid arrest.

== Cast ==
- John Moore as Doug Dooligan
- David Ngoombujarra as Floyd "Pretty Boy" Davies
- Jaylene Riley as Polly
- Lisa Kinchela as Valerie
- John Hargreaves as Detective Maxwell
- Ernie Dingo as Percy
- Julie Hudspeth as Mrs. Dooligan
- Jack Charles as Carey
- Michael Watson as Hughie
- Kelton Pell as Willice
- Vivienne Garrett as youth worker

== Production ==
James Ricketson became interested in the story in the early 1980s when he was directing an episode of Women of the Sun.

Ricketson talked of the conflicts during production of the racial issues of a white man telling a "blackfella" story and says Ngoombujarra said to him "You are a white-fella presuming to tell my story. Why should I trust you?"

== Reception ==
According to Ozmovies:

Proving once again that reviews can’t be banked, the film opened to generally positive reviews amongst mainstream newspaper reviewers but this didn't help at the box office.

Filmnews' Martha Ansara says the film "ended up, far from Weller's bleak novel, as an entertaining little urban-Aboriginal tele-melodrama." She writes "It's a film that tackles truth in sometimes phoney ways, but - like the more sophisticated Bedevil - it positions itself within the real complexities of post-seventies Aboriginality and thus helps make less possible racis,t idealised or just plain ludicrous representations." In the Sydney Morning Herald Lynden Barber writes "It's raw, colourful, tough, poignant, brimful of laconic humour and ribald energy" adding "it's the kind of film it is important we have, and have more of." Rob Lowing from the Sun-Herald gave it 3 stars and wrote "This is a drama for adults with an interest in the subject matter. The story is slim, relying more on the charisma of the lead stars and the finely observed details of a culture-within-a-culture than any riveting action." The Age's Neil Jillett called it the best Australian film of the year. He writes "'Blackfellas' is a powerful, honest (so far as I can tell, from my limited knowledge) and well-made drama — sometimes funny, but far more often tragic — that reflects a section of Australian society with a passion rarely achieved by our films." The Canberra Times' Dougal MacDonald gave it 4 stars and says "Ultimately, Blackfellas evolves as social melodrama in which the protagonists are underprivileged and black. While it cleaves to the ethos of both those categories of deprivation, its black element makes less impact than it warrants"

Paul Harris reviewed the video release in the Sunday Age's View and wrote "Ricketson spent five years seeking finance to make this film and he has succeeded without compromising artistic integrity or being forced to dilute some unpalatable truths."

Rod Bishop's capsule review in the Age's Green Guide says "The convincing realism of Blackfellas is helped by its strong sense of conviction, well-rounded characters and a humanistic treatment of the social issues."

== Awards ==
Award	Category	Subject	Result
AACTA Awards (1993 AFI Awards)	Best Direction	James Ricketson	Nominated
AACTA Awards (1993 AFI Awards)	Best Adapted Screenplay	James Ricketson	Won
AACTA Awards (1993 AFI Awards)	Best Actor	John Moore	Nominated
AACTA Awards (1993 AFI Awards)	Best Supporting Actor	David Ngoombujarra	Won

== See also ==
- Cinema of Australia
