= Ubu Films =

Australian experimental film-making collective

Ubu Films was an experimental film-making collective based in Sydney that operated from 1965 to around 1970. It was formed by Albie Thoms, David Perry, Aggy Read and John Clark at Sydney University in 1965. Group associates included Matt Carroll, Peter Weir, Phillip Noyce and Bruce Beresford.

Some members subsequently participated in the Sydney Filmmakers Co-op.
