= Palm Beach (1980 film) =

- Directed by: Albie Thoms
- Written by: Albie Thoms
- Produced by: Albie Thoms
- Starring: Kenneth Brown; Nat Young; Bryan Brown
- Cinematography: Oscar Scherl
- Edited by: Albie Thoms
- Music by: Terry Hannigan
- Production company: Albie Thoms Productions
- Distributed by: Albie Thoms
- Release date: 6 March 1980
- Running time: 88 minutes
- Country: Australia
- Language: English
- Budget: A$100,000

Palm Beach is a 1980 Australian drama film directed by Albie Thoms. The stories involving surfing and drugs are followed in Sydney during two days. Thoms was nominated for an AFI award for Best Original Screenplay for the film.

Thoms had made a large number of experimental films but this was his first traditional feature.

== Cast ==
- Kenneth Brown as Joe Ryan
- Nat Young as Nick Naylor
- Amanda Berry as Leilani Adams
- Bryan Brown as Paul Kite
- Julie McGregor as Kate O'Brien
- John Flaus as Larry Kent
- Bronwyn Steven-Jones as Wendy Naylor
- David Lourie as Zane Green
- Peter Wright as Rupert Robert
- John Clayton as Eric Tailor
- Lyn Collingwood as Mrs Adams
