= Sydney Women's Film Group =

Feminist film group in Sydney, Australia

The Sydney Women's Film Group (SWFG) was an Australian collective of women filmmakers in the 1970s. The group emerged from the Sydney Filmmakers' Cooperative (SFMC), created by women whose interest was in distributing and exhibiting films by, for, and about women. One of its best known films is Film for Discussion, released in 1973. Apart from filmmaking, film distribution and film exhibition, the group also advocated for women filmmakers and held workshops to assist them in their careers.

== History ==
From the beginning, the Sydney Women's Film Group (SWFG) was a group with feminist intentions and outlook, and was contemporaneous with, and part of, the Women's Liberation Movement in Sydney in the 1970s.

The Sydney Women's Film Group first appeared in the production credits of three films made in the early 1970s, Film for Discussion (1973), Woman's Day 20Cents (1973) and Home (1973), as part of the burgeoning Women's Liberation Movement. The name was then adopted for the distribution and exhibition group that was formed in 1973 within the Sydney Filmmakers Co-op. Sydney Women's Film Group and Feminist Filmworkers effectively ceased to exist once the Co-op's cinema closed in 1981 when the Australian Film Commission decided to no longer subsidise the cinema's operation.

Women involved in the founding of the SWFG production group included Jeni Thornley and Martha Ansara. The group also included Deirdre Ferguson, Virginia Coventry, Robynne Murphy, Margot Knox, Adrienne Kaye Martyn, and Julie Gibson, and was assisted by John Brotherton and Chris Tillam (Ansara's partner at the time).

According to Ansara, their method for making films was "rather nebulous and anarchistic". They embraced a collective approach, and their films were credited to the whole group rather than individuals. At that time there were very few individual women film directors, cinematographers, or sound recordists working in the newly reviving Australian film industry.

In 1978 Feminist Film Workers, a smaller closed group of SWFG members, was formed in response to "the growing apolitical and amorphous quality of the SWFG". This group continued to distribute and exhibit work.

== Films ==
The personnel involved in the production of Film for Discussion and Home made the decision that no individual credits would appear on the films. This was influenced by the wide-reaching and radical women's liberation critique of individualistic and hierarchical practices which were regarded as contributing to "famous men" notions of history. The production entity was therefore named as the Sydney Women's Film Group for these three films. Woman's Day 20Cents however also credits the four filmmakers.

The title of A Film for Discussion, which was long in the making, reflects the group's wish "to distinguish it from films where the audience members were merely passive consumers of entertainment". They found actors through the group's connections with the anti-Vietnam War street theatre group and the New Theatre. Chris Tillam had the most film experience in the group. Workshops were held with the participants, who also included Women's Liberation activists. They felt that "by analysing their own lives and experience, the filmmakers could better understand the general position of women, the social expectations and the work issues". There was no script, and the dialogue was improvised. Many 16mm copies of the film were sold and rented through the Sydney Filmmakers' Cooperative.

A Film for Discussion was a finalist in the documentary section at the 1973 Sydney Film Festival, and the SWFG protested at the festival against competitions, on the basis that it was wrong to compare films and choose one winner.

== Membership and activities ==
Though there were no formal membership requirements, most women who were active in the group had films in distribution with the Sydney Filmmakers Co-op, particularly after the productive Women's Film Workshop of 1974.

Although the name originated to describe a production entity, subsequently the activities of the group centred on distribution, exhibition, workshops and discussions, and political lobbying.

== Workshops and influence ==
The Womenvision weekend, held at the Sydney Filmmakers Co-operative in November 1973, was billed as "a weekend for women involved in the media, but more importantly it's a weekend for women interested in finding out about being women". Attended by over 200 women, the weekend program viewed and discussed the stereotypical roles historically written for women in fiction films, the difficulty of finding work as an actress if you were not prepared to play these roles, and the male domination of the film and television industries in both creative and technical roles. The first practical result of Womenvision was successfully lobbying the newly-created Australian Film and Television School for funding for an independently run Women's Film Workshop (1974), the aim of which was to teach the basics of scriptwriting, filming, sound recording, and editing by the production of short 16mm films. Several participants in the workshop subsequently went on to careers in various aspects of the developing Australian film and television industries, and to foundational teaching roles in newly created media courses within tertiary institutions.

Subsequent SWFG lobbying resulted in a course in held at the Australian Film and Television School in 1977, which provided participants with the opportunity to learn basic television studio production processes.

Of the less tangible influence of the work undertaken by the SWFG, film and television producer Jan Chapman had this to say on reflection in 2002: "Without the influence and political lobbying of these women I don't believe I would have had the subconscious conviction... that I could make films, and that what I wanted to say, even if intimate, domestic and personal in scale, was just as interesting as the mythic male legends".
