= Patsy Stephen =

Australian actress

- Occupation: Actress
- Years active: 1986-96

Patsy Stephen is an Australian actress. She played the lead role in Candy Regentag and in the TV miniseries Dancing Daze, co-starred in Prejudice and featured in the TV series Chances. Together with Chad Tyler and Crispin Taylor she founded Don't Stop Now Productions who put on the collection of plays All in the Timing in 1995. She had previously appeared on stage in Sight Unseen in 1994.
