= Australia Daze =

- Directed by: Pat Fiske
- Produced by: Graeme Isaac
- Music by: Davood Tabrizi
- Release date: 1988
- Running time: 75 minutes
- Country: Australia
- Language: English

Australia Daze is a 1988 Australian documentary film that takes a look at how various Australians spent Australia Day 1988.

== Overview ==
Australia Daze is a combination of footage shot by 29 different camera crews in various locations around Australia from midnight to midnight on 26 January 1988, the Bicentenary of European settlement in Australia.

The film includes footage of the Aboriginal Protest of the Bicentenary, where more than 40,000 people marched through Sydney in the largest march in Sydney since the Vietnam Moratorium.

== Awards ==
Ceremony	Category	Result
Australian Film Institute Awards	Best Editing	Won
