= Erika Addis =

Australian camerawoman

Erika Addis (born 1954) is an Australian camerawoman best known for her work on documentary films. A graduate of the Australian Film & Television School (AFTS), she has also lectured on cinematography there. In 2022 Addis was elected the National President of the Australian Cinematographers Society, "the first female national president in the society's history."

While living in Adelaide, Addis worked for the Bureau of Census and Statistics. In 1975 she was accepted into a three-month film production workshop, funded by AFTS (then known as the Australian Film, Television, and Radio School).

== Professional work ==
With Helen Grace, Addis made Serious Undertakings (1982), an early example of independent filmmaking by Australian women. At the beginning of her career, as part of the camera crew, she worked on such iconic Australian films as Storm Boy (1976) and The Year My Voice Broke (1987).
