= Jonathan Binns Were =

Australian politician and stockbroker (1809–85)

Jonathan Binns Were CMG

Member of the Victorian Legislative Assembly for Brighton
- In office 1 November 1856 – 1 February 1857
- Preceded by: inaugural
- Succeeded by: Charles Ebden
- Born: 25 April 1809; Wellington, Somerset, England
- Died: 6 September 1885 (aged 76); Brighton, Victoria, Australia
- Occupations: Stockbroker; politician; honorary consul
- Known for: JBWere
- Board member of: Melbourne Chamber of Commerce; The Bible Society; Melbourne Hospital Committee; Immigration Board; Melbourne Stock Exchange
- Spouses: Sophia Mullet Dunsford (m. 1833–1881); Elizabeth McArthur (m. 1882)
- Children: 12; 3 dec'd in infancy
- Parents: Nicholas Were (father); Frances Were (née Binns) (mother)

Jonathan Binns Were CMG (25 April 1809 – 6 September 1885) was an Australian politician, member of the Victorian Legislative Assembly and a stockbroker — the eponym of JBWere.

== Biography ==
Were was the third son of Nicholas Were, of Landcox, Somerset, by his wife Frances (née Binns) and was born at Wellington, in that county. The Weres were a junior branch of a landowning family of Devon and Somerset, said to derive from the Giffard family of Brightley, Chittlehampton; despite appearing in records dating back to the 1400s, and their arms as having been used since at least the early 1600. Paul De Serville observed that "after appearing in Burke’s Commoners, the family was dropped from... subsequent editions. It is hard to escape the conclusion that they were an ascendant family who gained the capricious attention of the Burke's, and then lost it."

In England, Were was in business as a merchant. He married Sophia Mullet Dunsford in 1833, by whom he would have twelve children. He travelled from Plymouth aboard the William Metcalfe from July to November 1839, when he arrived at Port Phillip, now Victoria, Australia, with his wife, infant son Jonathan Henry, and four-year-old daughter Sophia Louisa. Were had laid meticulous plans for the family's life in Australia: "While most newcomers were seeking in vain for tradesmen to build them houses he unpacked his imported house and erected it on a site on the south-western corner of Collins and Spring Streets... it was on the outskirts of the settlement. The home was named 'Harmony Lodge'".

He established himself as a merchant in Melbourne, soon expanding into other business resulting from the 'gold era'- "an advertisement appeared in the Melbourne papers announcing that J. B. Were & Co. were cash purchasers of gold dust, wool and tallow, or would make liberal cash advances on such commodities consigned to their agents, Messrs Frederick Huth & Co., London."

In 1852, Were unsuccessfully contested South Bourke for a seat in the original unicameral Victorian Legislative Council, Henry Miller defeating him. Four years later Were was returned to the Victorian Legislative Assembly for Brighton, in opposition to John Dennistoun Wood. He resigned, however, in March 1857, and never re-entered political life.

Trading initially under his own name, and then with his brother, George, as importers, exporters, and agents for shipping, land, cattle, sheep and wool; he formed J. B. Were & Son from 1861 with his son, Jonathan Henry, and later, other sons, Francis Wellington and Arthur Bonville, where they became brokers and buyers of gold, and dealt in shares.

Were was elected the inaugural chairman of the Melbourne Stock Exchange in 1865. He served as an honorary consul in Melbourne for several foreign nations, was the first chairman of the Melbourne Chamber of Commerce in 1841, and, was re-elected in 1852. In 1881 he was appointed a Commander of the Order of St Michael and St George (CMG) in recognition of his services in connection with the Melbourne International Exhibition of 1880. Between 28 March 1851 and his death in 1885, Were served as the honorary consul for Sweden–Norway, and was knighted by the kings of Sweden and Denmark in recognition of his service.

Were died on 6 September 1885, in Victoria, Australia. Having married again in 1882, he was survived by his second wife, Elizabeth (née McArthur).
