= Ric Throssell =

Australian writer and diplomat

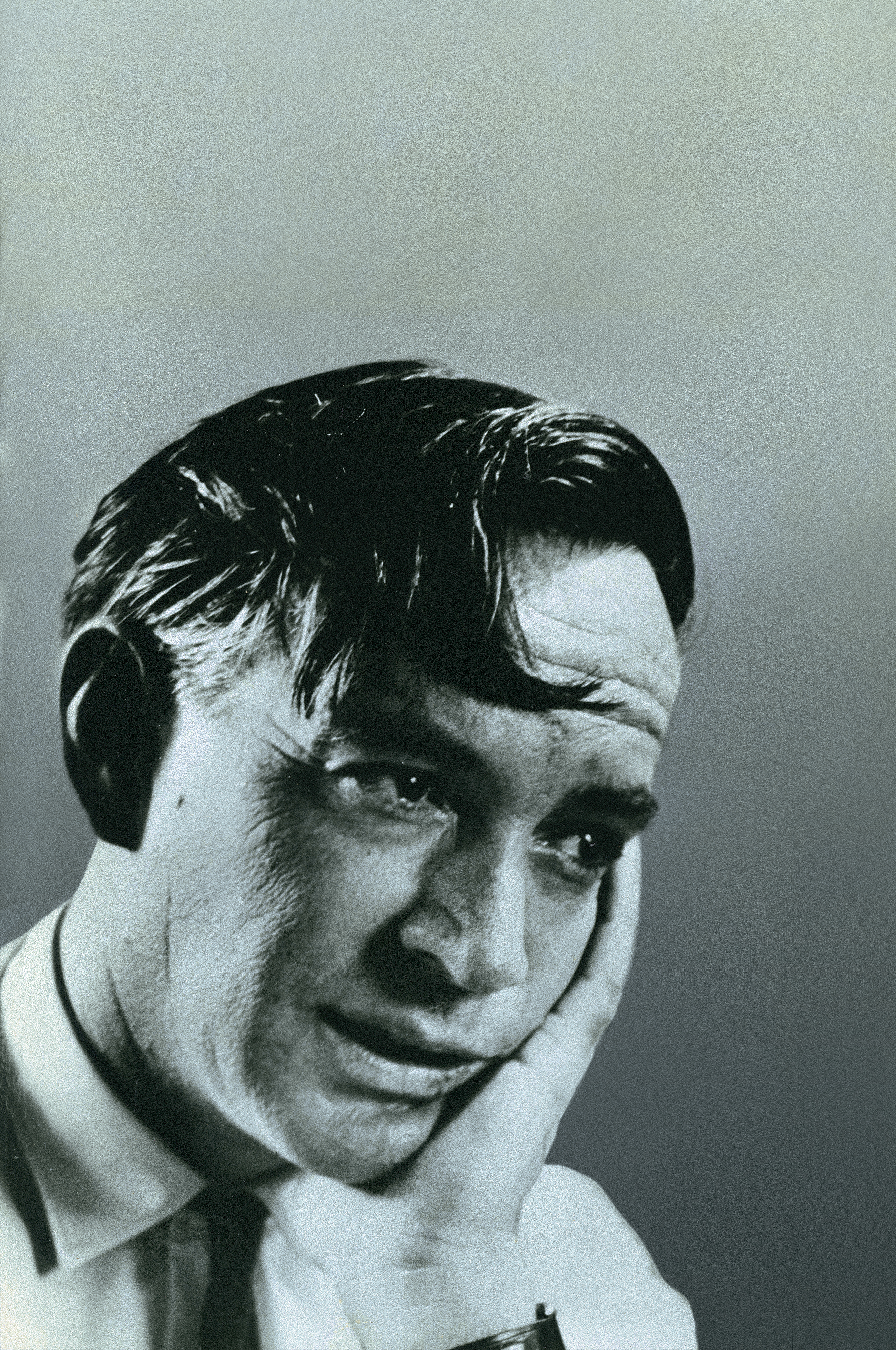
- Born: Ric Prichard Throssell; 10 May 1922; Perth, Australia
- Died: 20 April 1999 (aged 76); Canberra, Australia
- Spouses: Elwyn Hague "Bea" Gallacher (19??-1946; her death); Dorothy "Dodie" Jordan (m. 1947; died 1999)
- Parents: Hugo Throssell (father); Katharine Susannah Prichard (mother)

Ric Prichard Throssell (10 May 1922 – 20 April 1999) was an Australian diplomat and author whose writings included novels, plays, film and television scripts, and memoirs. For most of his professional life as a diplomat his career was dogged by unproven allegations that he either leaked classified information to his mother, the writer and communist Katharine Susannah Prichard, or was himself a spy for the Soviet Union.

== Early life and education ==
Ric Prichard Throssell was born on 10 May 1922 in Western Australia, in the Perth suburb of Greenmount. His father was Hugo Throssell, a winner of the Victoria Cross at Gallipoli in 1915, and son of a former Premier of Western Australia, George Throssell. His mother was the writer Katharine Susannah Prichard. Ric was their only child. He was nicknamed after his father's late brother Frank Erick "Ric" Cottrell Throssell, who was killed at the 2nd Battle of Gaza in 1917. Prichard was a founding member of the Communist Party of Australia in 1919, and remained a member for the rest of her life.

Ric Throssell attended Wesley College, Perth.

On 19 November 1933, while his mother was on a six-month visit to the Soviet Union, his father Hugo committed suicide. His business ventures had failed in the Great Depression, and he entertained the hope that his wife would now qualify for a war widow's pension.

Although Ric had hoped to be a film director, with the approach of World War II commencing he began work as a school monitor, while attending lectures at the University of Western Australia. He then trained as a primary school teacher at Claremont Teachers College.

== Army and diplomatic service ==
On 19 September 1941 Throssell enlisted in the Citizen Military Forces of the Australian Army. He transferred to the Australian Imperial Force on 11 July 1942, and served in New Guinea with the Milne Force Signals from 21 August. After being selected for the diplomatic cadet program with the Department of External Affairs, he was discharged with the rank of lance corporal in June 1943.

In 1943, he joined the diplomatic service, his first posting being to Moscow in 1945, as Third Secretary. His first wife, Bea, died suddenly of polio in 1946 while they were in Moscow, and he returned to Canberra. In the late 1940s Throssell was an adviser to H. V. Evatt in the latter's capacity as President of the United Nations General Assembly.

From 1949 to 1951 he was posted at the Australian Embassy in Rio de Janeiro, Brazil.

Due to these associations and the Cold War tensions of the time, Throssell became a person of interest to the Australian Security Intelligence Organisation (ASIO). In 1954, the Soviet defector Vladimir Petrov named him as a spy, alleging he had given information to Walter Seddon Clayton (who was later proven to be a Soviet agent with the codename 'KLOD') and he was questioned for a week by the Royal Commission on Espionage, created soon after the Petrov affair. The questioning concerned his contact with Russians in Australia, and whether he had told his mother anything about his work. The Royal Commission eventually concurred in his vehement denials of any intentional espionage, although it stated that he may have inadvertently let drop classified information to people in the circles in which he moved. For example, one of his close friends was Jim Hill (also named by Petrov), brother of the Victorian Communist Party leader Ted Hill, who later broke away to form a Maoist group.

Although Throssell was officially exonerated, his career was stymied from that point onwards. On ASIO's advice he was repeatedly denied access to highly classified documents, and was refused promotion in the then Department of External Affairs. In 1955, the Secretary of the Department, Arthur Tange, even wrote to the Solicitor-General asking if there were grounds for having Throssell dismissed from the Public Service; the reply said that "no charge against Throssell could possibly succeed". Nevertheless, the smears and suspicion continued unabated and Tange maintained a correspondence with ASIO about Throssell.

However, he played an important role in administering the Colombo Plan, and in 1962 led the formation of the department's Cultural Relations Branch.

In 1974, the new departmental head, Alan Renouf, sought to use his influence to have Throssell security cleared to a higher level, but the CIA threatened to cut security ties with the Whitlam government and the plan foundered.

In 1980 he was appointed Director of the Commonwealth Foundation in London, where he stayed until a stroke forced his retirement in 1983.

== Spying allegations ==
In 1996, certain transcripts of secret Soviet diplomatic communications known as the Venona decrypts were released in Washington. Before they were released in Australia, the Department of Foreign Affairs and Trade asked Throssell if he wanted his name deleted. He replied that he was as interested as anyone in finally discovering what had been said about him, and approved of the unredacted release. It proved to contain three innocuous references to him, the substance of which had all been canvassed in the Royal Commission 42 years earlier. Nevertheless, Throssell was re-branded a spy on the front page of the Brisbane Courier-Mail under the headline "Confirmed: Our Soviet Spies", along with a photo of him in the company of British traitors Guy Burgess and Donald Maclean. The paper later issued an apology.

In 1998, Des Ball and David Horner published their book Breaking the Codes, which for the first time detailed the full extent of ASIO's case against Throssell. This included a claim that he actively cooperated with the KGB when he was representing Australia in Brazil in the late 1940s. David Horner went on to publish the Official History of ASIO as its lead author and editor. The first volume, the Spy Catchers (2014), discusses Throssell's case:

By the 1960s additional Venona intercepts had been deciphered and they had revealed more information, confirming that Throssell was [codename] Ferro and that his mother, Katherine Susannah Prichard... had discussed how his career might be of use to the Soviets. The intercepts suggested that Prichard might have passed information from her son to Clayton without her son's knowledge... The Throssell case was never resolved.

In 2012, further allegations against Throssell were made based on information from Coral Bell, who had been his junior colleague in the Department of External Affairs in 1947 and who believed he had attempted to recruit her to the spy ring.

=== Attempts to clear his name ===
Under Freedom of Information laws that had been introduced in 1982, Throssell was now able to gain access to some ASIO documents previously denied him. These painted what he called "another self, a secret person portrayed by the anonymous men of the Australian intelligence services". He also had considerable dealings with the Administrative Appeals Tribunal on these matters. In 1983, the newly elected Hawke Government had his case reconsidered and, on the advice of ASIO, declined to reveal its determination on the basis that the Venona decrypts still required "the highest level of protection".

== Personal life ==
Throssell married Elwen Hague "Bea" Gallacher, also a public servant, in an Anglican ceremony on 29 September 1945 at Carlingford, Sydney, but she died suddenly in 1946 while he was posted to Moscow.

After returning to Canberra from Moscow, he met librarian Eileen Dorothy "Dodie" Jordan, and they married at St John's Church of England in Reid on 3 October 1947. She was never formally a member of the party, but had participated in guerrilla training in the Dandenong Ranges as a member of its youth arm, the Eureka Youth League. They had four children, one of whom died as a baby.

== Later life and death ==
In 1983, to help fund the production of the film The Pursuit of Happiness, directed by Martha Ansara and based on a book by his daughter Karen Throssell, he donated his father's Victoria Cross to People for Nuclear Disarmament. The Returned and Services League of Australia bought the medal and presented it to the Australian War Memorial.

Throssell was an active member of Canberra Repertory Theatre as a director, writer and actor.

His wife Dodie died on 20 April 1999 after a long illness, and he committed suicide later the same day. They were survived by three of their children and five grandchildren.

== Bibliography ==
=== Fiction ===
==== Novels ====
- A Reliable Source (1991)
- In the Wilderness of Mirrors (1992)
- Tomorrow (1997)
- Jackpot (1998)

==== Plays ====
- Devil Wear Black (1955)
- The Day Before Tomorrow (1956)
- Legend (1957)
- For Valour (1958)
- The Sweet Sad Story of Elmo and Me (1966) - TV
- about 25 other plays

=== Non-fiction ===
- My Father's Son (runner-up in the Banjo Non-Fiction Awards 1989; revised version 1997, with a new postscript, "The Last Knot Untied", stating that he "had been a victim of the intelligence game for most of my life".)
- Wild Weeds and Wind Flowers: The Life and Letters of Katharine Susannah Prichard (1975)

He also edited two collections of his mother's writings:

- Straight Left (1982)
- Tribute: Selected Stories of Katharine Susannah Prichard (1988)

== Sources ==
- "Ric Throssell". Austlit. Archived from the original on 5 December 2025.
- Throssell, Karen (31 December 2010). "Throssell spy fiction". The Australian.
- "Throssell, Hugo Vivian Hope (1884–1933)". Australian Dictionary of Biography. ANU.
- "Ric Throssell". ACT Writers. Archived from the original on 12 March 2014.
- "Papers of Ric Throssell- MS 8071". nla.gov.au.
