= Romaine Moreton =

Bundjalung and Jagera writer, poet and filmmaker

Romaine Moreton (1969 - ) is a Bundjalung, Goenpul Yagera and South Sea Islander researcher, writer, poet and filmmaker.

She was first inspired to become a writer after reading The Color Purple by Alice Walker in her teens, this was the first book that Moreton had read about that's main character was a person of colour and also the first by a black author. In her early career Moreton focused on poetry and, additionally, performed as a spoken word poet. She sees poetry as a part of her spiritual responsibility as an Aboriginal person.

Moreton's poetry is often labelled as protest poetry and this is something that she embraces; she has stated that "[i]t ain’t easy being black / this kinda livin’ is all political". In her work she looks at racial discrimination, institutionalisation and poverty, along with other themes. Moreton also writes with a First Nations audience in mind and seeks to use words and imagery that are accessible and relevant to them. Additionally, in her poems, she also often writes very directly and poses rhetorical questions to engage its readers.

Since 2015 she has been the chief executive officer of Binung Boorigan Pty Ltd, which she is also the cofounder of alongside Lou Bennett. This is a First Nations owned and led media research production company. In this role she centres, promotes and acts as an activist for rematriation, language activism and storytelling.

A large part of the motivation for her work can be seen in the following quote from her:

Colonialism has ruptured Indigenous peoples’ lives. I see filmmaking as an opportunity for Indigenous people to reconnect: to emphasise connections between ourselves, and our shared connection with the land.

— Romaine Moreton, via Australia Indigenous Film & TV research

Moreton additionally serves as the director of First Nations and Outreach Australian Film Television and Radio School. There, again alongside Bennett, she has been working on an Indigenous curriculum which will be the first of its kind.

== Works ==
=== Books ===
- The callused stick of wanting (1996)
- Rimfire (2000)
- Post me to the Prime Minister (2004)
- Poems from a homeland (2012)

=== Films ===
- Redreaming the dark (short, 1997)
- The Farm (short, 2009)
- The Oysterman (short, 2012)

=== Additional ===
- Between 2014 and 2016, while a research fellow at Monash University, she completed a transmedia work One Billion Beats which looks at the historical representation of Aboriginal people in Australian cinema.
