= Sydney Filmmakers Co-op =

Australian artist group

The Sydney Filmmakers Co-operative was a co-operative of independent filmmakers, set up to distribute and exhibit their films and the films of other independent filmmakers both Australian and overseas. The collection eventually included short films experimenting with film technique, low budget features, and documentaries with a particular emphasis on progressive social issues. Founding members were the experimental filmmakers of the 60s and early 70s, including Aggy Read, David Perry, Albie Thoms, Phillip Adams, Phillip Noyce, and later Bruce Petty.

The Co-op grew out of the earlier, less formal, group Ubu Films and held its first official meeting in May 1970. One month earlier, the Experimental Film Fund had come into operation, and suddenly filmmakers had the beginnings of government support for independent or non-feature production in the 16mm format – in fact, independent production became largely government dependent. With the receipt of support for distribution and exhibition from the recently formed and federally funded Australian Film Commission (AFC), the Co-op opened its own 100-seat cinema in St Peters Lane Darlinghurst in 1973, with the upstairs premises used for film distribution and production of the newspaper Filmnews, begun in February 1975. The paper was initially little more than a supplement to the Co-op's Film Catalogue, but later developed into an independent journal which provided a critical look at issues affecting the production, distribution and exhibition of film and video in Australia.

With the beginnings of the Co-op coinciding with the burgeoning of the Women's Liberation movement, and of the Aboriginal Land Rights movement, the Co-op distributed and exhibited some of the first Australian films by, for, and about women, and some of the first films about Aboriginal Australian history and politics. The Sydney Women's Film Group, a collective of members from within the Co-op, was particularly active in distributing women's films for screening at various women's movement events, and Film Co-op women were responsible for programming and producing The International Women's Film Festival of 1975.

And as part of the newly reviving Australian film industry, several early Co-op members went on to key roles and careers in mainstream feature film and television production, including Phillip Noyce, Peter Weir and Jan Chapman.

In 1981, the Co-op's cinema closed when the AFC decided not to continue its funding subsidy; and the St Peters Lane premises were vacated in February 1985. The AFC supported the Co-op’s move to new premises in Pyrmont, and encouraged more aggressive marketing and distribution policies, but these policies stretched the Co-op’s resources. The AFC decided that only one government-funded distribution body was to be supported and that was the AFI; the Co-op had to close its doors in February 1986.
