= Filmnews =

Australian periodical

Filmnews was a monthly newspaper that covered independent film production, distribution and exhibition in Australia and the federal and state government policies and practices that supported them. Produced in Sydney, it was distributed around Australia, containing news, reviews, interviews, articles and some gossip on the local film community. It ran from February 1975, from government startup grants over 1973–74, to 1995.

== History ==
Filmnews' first issue appeared in February 1975. Published in St Peters' Lane, Darlinghurst, Filmnews began as a newsletter with screening and meeting information and catalogue of the Sydney Filmmakers Co-op. In August 1975 filmmaker Aggy Read complained that it was "flabby and indulgent with very little meaningful news/info/dialogue", which galvanised the newspaper into transforming into a legitimate newspaper for the filmmaker/worker community.

In 1981 the Co-op’s cinema closed as its funding from the AFC ceased. The AFC, however, supported the Co-op’s move to new premises in Pyrmont, and pushed for more aggressive marketing and distribution policies. This put the Co-op’s under pressure, and the AFC then determined to fund only one body, the AFI leading the Co-op had to fold.

A short and poorly planned relationship with a commercial proprietor (Encore)—selected by the AFC—followed before FilmNews was allowed to become its own entity. Filmnews moved to Metro TV (now Metro Screen) in the Paddington Town Hall complex several years.

== Content ==
Filmnews advocated strongly for women's films and women filmmakers, questioning existing training practices and criticising Short-term programs in sydney and Melbourne.
