= Australian Cinematographers Society =

Nonprofit organisation founded in 1958

- Australian Cinematographers Society
- Founded: 1958; 68 years ago
- Headquarters: Level 2, 26 Ridge Street, North Sydney, New South Wales 2060.
- Location: Australia
- Key people: Erika Addis
- Website: cinematographer.org.au

The Australian Cinematographers Society (ACS) is a not-for-profit organisation founded in 1958 for the purpose of providing a forum for Australian cinematographers to further develop their skills through mutual co-operation.

== History ==
The Australian Cinematographers Society was co-founded by John Leake OAM (1927-2009), whose career started at the age of 15. He served as both NSW president and national president of the organisation, and became its official historian, a role he continued until his death.

== Location ==
The national headquarters and clubhouse of the ACS is located at 26 Ridge St, North Sydney.

== Mission ==
The ACS states the following aims:

- To keep members informed about the latest technology with new equipment demonstrations and ideas through meetings and seminars
- To further the advancement of cinematography in all fields and give due recognition to the outstanding work performed by Australian cinematographers
- To provide a forum for cinematographers to meet with other members of the industry to discuss and exchange ideas, promote friendship and better understanding of each other's industry role

== People ==
Its first national president was Syd Wood.

In January 2022 Erika Addis was appointed ACS national president, the first female to hold the office. As of May 2025 she is still president.

Members of the Society who are "accredited" are allowed to use the "ACS" suffix after their name. Accreditation is considered one of the highest honours bestowed upon a member and accreditation demonstrates more than just professional competence, but also creativity, consistency and aesthetic innovation.

== Recognition and awards ==
The Australian Academy of Cinema and Television Arts (AACTA) awarded the Australian Cinematographers Society (ACS) the 2014 Byron Kennedy Award at the 3rd annual AACTA Awards. The award celebrates outstanding creative enterprise within the film and television industries and is given to an individual or organisation whose work embodies innovation and the relentless pursuit of excellence. The award jury said of their decision: "We have chosen the Australian Cinematographers Society under the stewardship of Ron Johanson ACS for its enduring and pivotal role in the pursuit of excellence throughout Australian cinema". The award was presented to Ron Johanson ACS on behalf of the Society at the AACTA Awards ceremony in Sydney on 30 January 2014.

== ACS Awards ==
The ACS awards the National Awards for Cinematography, also known as the ACS Awards for Cinematography, in a number of categories. The winner of each category is awarded the Gold Tripod, and there is sometimes an Award of Distinction given to a runner-up.

Cinematographers who have had a significant career may be inducted into the ACS Hall of Fame.

=== Milli Award ===
The Milli Award is the highest award an Australian Cinematographer can receive from the society. It is presented at the ACS National Awards for Cinematography to the Australian Cinematographer of the Year. All ACS National Gold Tripod winners progress through to be in the running for the Milli Award.

=== Emerging cinematographer award ===
First presented in 2010, the NFSA and Australian Cinematographers Society John Leake OAM Award for an Emerging Cinematographer, also known as the NFSA-ACS John Leake OAM ACS Award and as of 2025 the John Leake OAM ACS – Emerging Cinematographer Award, is designed to enable emerging cinematographers to develop their craft, and is presented annually at the Australian Cinematographers Society Awards. The award is named in honour of Australian Cinematographers Society (ACS) co-founder and industry icon John Leake OAM (1927–2009). Winners of the award include:

- 2010: Kirsty Stark (SA)
- 2011: Edward Goldner (Vic)
- 2012: Jimmy Ennett (ACT)
- 2013: Dale Bremner (NSW)
- 2014: Thom Neal (NT)
- 2015: Josh Farmelo (Vic)
- 2016: Simon J Walsh (Vic)
- 2017: Mark Kenfield (Vic)
- 2018: Ben Cotgrave (Qld)
- 2019: Claire Bishop (SA)
- 2020: Not held (COVID-19 pandemic)
- 2021: Megan Ogilvie (NSW)
- 2022: Bonnie Paku (SA)
- 2023: Joanna Cameron (NSW)
- 2024: Jaclyn Paterson (NSW)
- 2025: Sarah Whyte (SA)

== Legacy ==
At least six members of the society have been awarded with the Academy Award for Best Cinematography.

- Dean Semler ACS ASC for Dances With Wolves (1990).
- John Seale ACS ASC for The English Patient (1996).
- Andrew Lesnie ACS ASC for The Lord of the Rings: The Fellowship of the Ring (2001).
- Russell Boyd ACS ASC for Master and Commander: The Far Side of the World (2003).
- Dion Beebe ACS ASC for Memoirs of a Geisha (2005).
- Greig Fraser ACS ASC for Dune (2021).

A seventh member of the society, Mandy Walker ACS ASC, became the first female president of the American Society of Cinematographers.

== Books and publications ==
- AC Magazine is the quarterly journal of the Australian Cinematographers Society.
- The Shadowcatchers: A history of Cinematography in Australia (2012)
