= Hugo Throssell =

Recipient of the Victoria Cross

Hugo Throssell VC
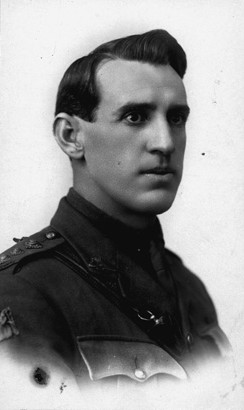
- Throssell c. 1918
- Born: 26 October 1884; Northam, Western Australia
- Died: 19 November 1933 (aged 49); Greenmount, Western Australia
- Spouse: Katharine Susannah Prichard (m. 1919)
- Relatives: Ric Throssell (son)
- Military career
- Allegiance: Australia
- Branch: Australian Imperial Force
- Service years: 1914–1918
- Rank: Captain
- Conflicts: First World War; Gallipoli Campaign; Battle of the Nek; Battle of Hill 60; Sinai and Palestine Campaign; Second Battle of Gaza
- Awards: Victoria Cross; Mentioned in Despatches

Hugo Vivian Hope Throssell, VC (26 October 1884 – 19 November 1933) was an Australian soldier in the First World War who was the first Western Australian and only Australian light horseman to receive the Victoria Cross (VC), the highest award for valour in battle that could be awarded to a member of the Australian armed forces at the time.

== Early life ==
Hugo Vivian Hope Throssell was born in Northam, Western Australia on 26 October 1884, the son of George Throssell, who was later briefly Premier of Western Australia, and his wife Anne, née Morrell. Hugo was one of fourteen children born to the couple. He was educated at Prince Alfred College in Adelaide from January 1896 to December 1902, where, nicknamed "Jimmy", he was a noted athlete, and captain of three intercollegiate sports teams.

On the outbreak of the First World War in 1914, he joined the Australian Imperial Force and was allotted to the 10th Light Horse Regiment. His brother, Frank Erick Cottrell Throssell, known as "Ric", also served in the war and died near Gaza. Hugo Throssell's son, Richard Prichard "Ric" Throssell, shared the same family nickname as his uncle.

== First World War ==
As a second lieutenant Hugo Throssell fought at Gallipoli, where he had landed on 4 August. He saw action in the desperate Battle of the Nek. According to the Australian Dictionary of Biography:

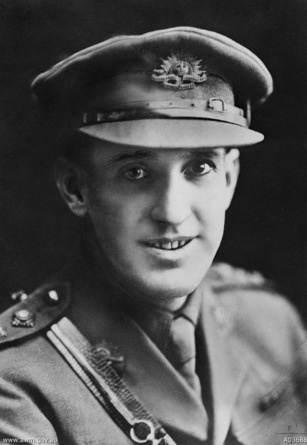
Captain Hugo Throssell c.1918

This experience increased his eagerness to prove himself in battle. He wanted to avenge the 10th L.H.R. which, like so many of the Anzac troops, was battle-worn, sick and depleted. His chance came later that month at Hill 60 during a postponed attempt by British and Anzac troops to widen the strip of foreshore between the two bridgeheads at Anzac and Suvla by capturing the hills near Anafarta. Hill 60, a low knoll, lay about half a mile (0.8 km) from the beach. Hampered by confusion and lack of communication between the various flanks, the battle had been raging for a week with heavy losses.

A few weeks later, he fought at Hill 60:

On 29–30 August 1915 at Kaiakij Aghala (Hill 60), Gallipoli, Turkey, Second Lieutenant Throssell, although severely wounded in several places, refused to leave his post during a counter-attack or to obtain medical assistance until all danger was passed, when he had his wounds dressed and returned to the firing line until ordered out of action by the Medical Officer. By his personal courage and example he kept up the spirits of his party and was largely instrumental in saving the situation at a critical period.

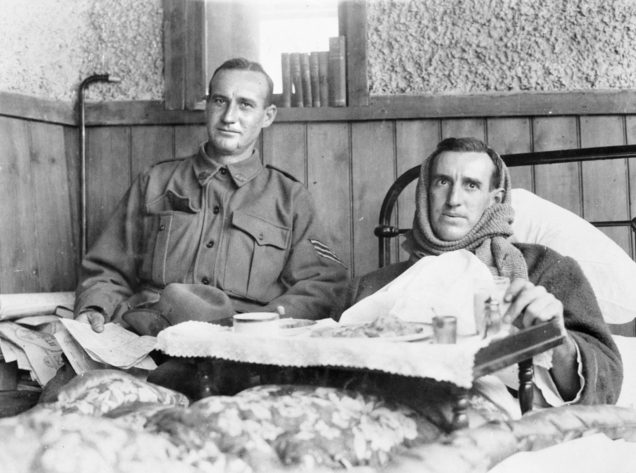
Hugo Throssell (right) with his brother Ric, recovering from wounds, Wandsworth Hospital, October 1915

Whilst recuperating from his wounds in London he was introduced to Katharine Susannah Prichard, an Australian journalist who had recently won a significant novel competition and would go on to be a famous author and socialist. He eventually returned to active service, rejoining the 10th Light Horse in the Middle East where he fought in a number of engagements, and achieved the rank of captain. He returned home in 1918, and in 1919 married Prichard after the war ended.

== Post-war, socialism and death ==
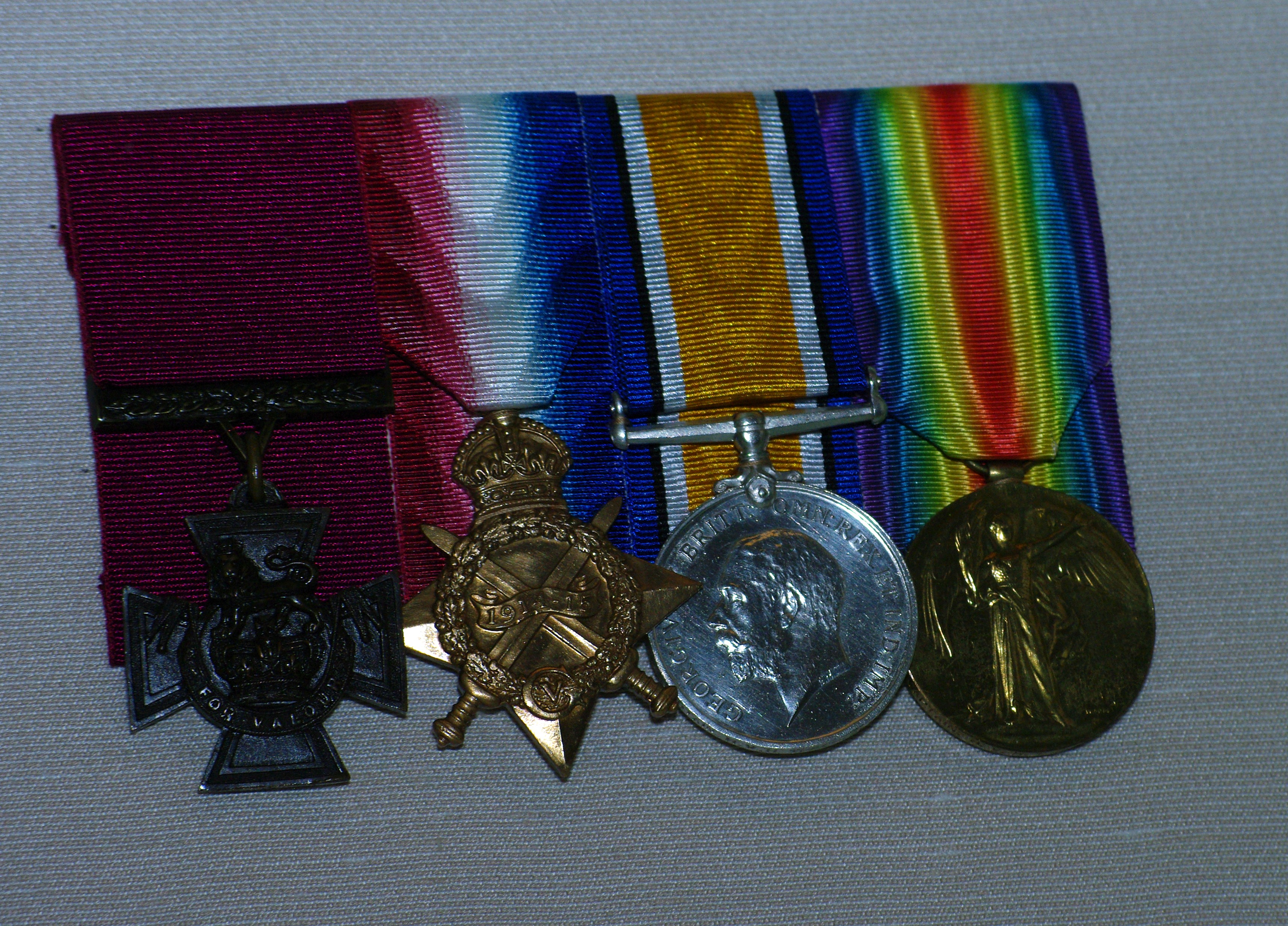
Throssell's medals on display at the Australian War memorial

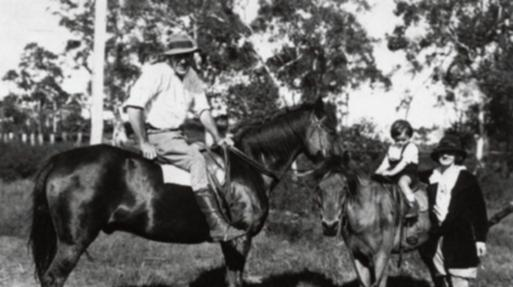
Throssell with his wife and son (1924)

In the following years Throssell was an outspoken opponent of war, and claimed that the suffering he had seen had made him a socialist. His stance on the futility of war outraged many people, especially as it was being expressed by a national war hero and the son of a respected and conservative former premier. His very public political opinions badly damaged his employment prospects, and he fell deeply into financial debt. On 19 November 1933, he killed himself, while his wife was on a tour of the Soviet Union.

== Memorials ==
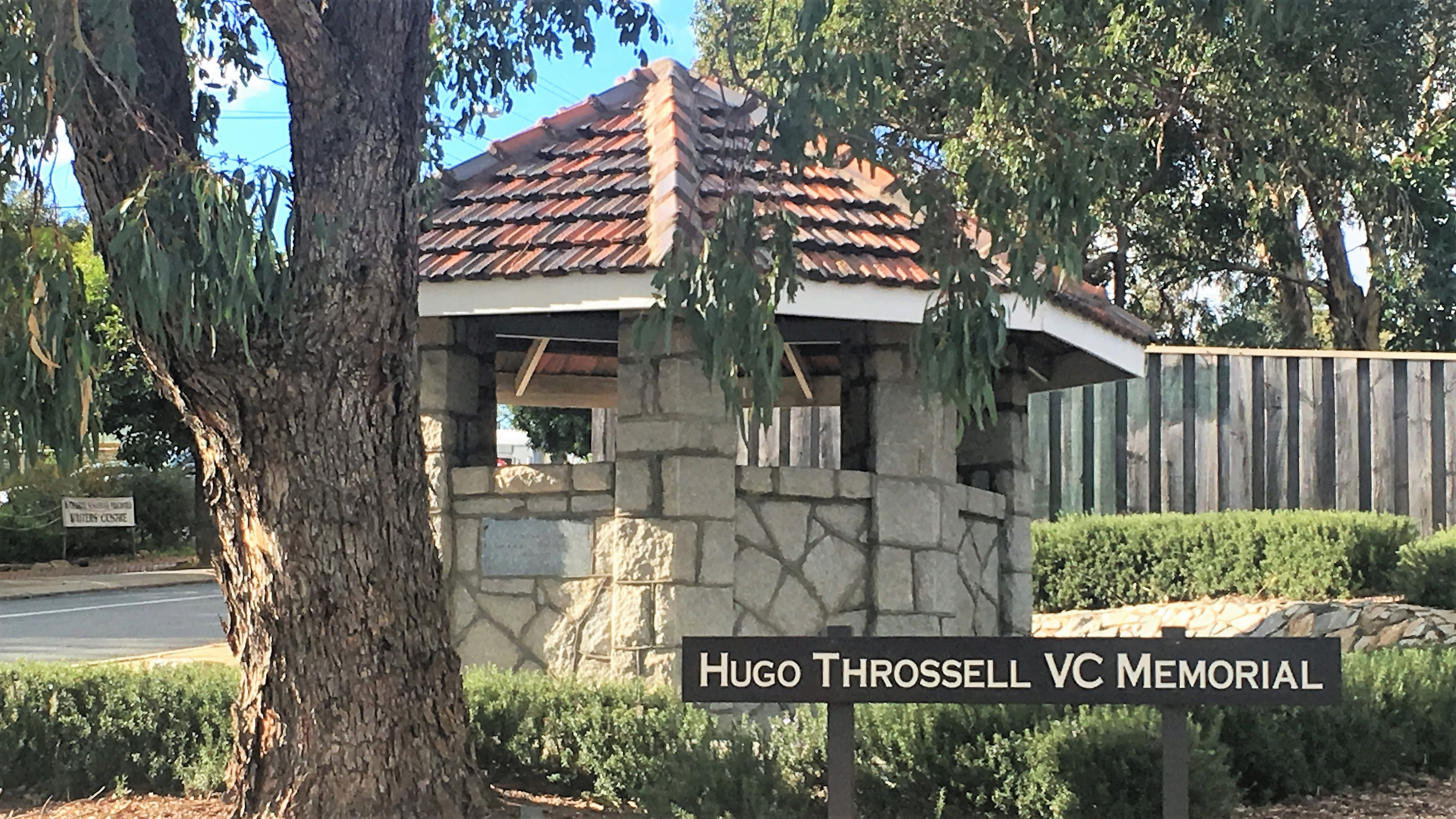
Memorial, Greenmount, Western Australia

Hugo Vivian Hope Throssell was buried with full military honours in the Anglican section of Karrakatta cemetery, Perth. In 2014 the grave was refurbished and a new grave stone placed.

In 1954 an octagonal stone gazebo was dedicated to Throssell in Greenmount at the intersection of Great Eastern Highway and Old York Road. It stands opposite the Katharine Susannah Prichard Writers' Centre.

A ward at the former Repatriation General Hospital, Hollywood was temporarily named in his honour.

Throssell's Victoria Cross is displayed in the Hall of Valour at the Australian War Memorial in Canberra. In 1983 his son Ric Throssell presented it to People for Nuclear Disarmament. The Returned Services League of Australia bought the medal and presented it to the Australian War Memorial.

A statue of Throssell was unveiled in the Avon Mall in Northam on Anzac Day 2015.
