= James Ricketson =

Australian film director (born 1949)

- Born: James Staniforth Ricketson
- Education: Australian Film and Television School
- Occupation: Film director
- Notable credits: Third Person Plural (1978); Candy Regentag (1989); Blackfellas (1994)
- Opponent: Cambodian Children's Fund
- Criminal charge: Espionage
- Criminal penalty: Six years in custody (sentenced under Cambodian law)
- Criminal status: Pardoned
- Relatives: Staniforth Ricketson (grandfather)
- Awards: AACTA Award for Best Adapted Screenplay, Blackfellas (1994); AACTA Award for Best Film, Reflections (1973); Alan Stout Award for Best Short Film, Reflections (1973)

James Staniforth Ricketson is an Australian film director, known for the feature film Blackfellas. He became more widely known when he was charged with espionage for flying a drone in Cambodia in 2017.

== Early life and education ==
James Staniforth Ricketson is the grandson of Australian businessman and politician Staniforth Ricketson.

Ricketson studied at the Australian Film and Television School in Sydney.

== Film career ==
Ricketson has made a number of features and documentaries.

In 1973 Ricketson filmed and helped to organise Philippe Petit's high-wire walk between the two north pylons of Sydney Harbour Bridge. A short film of the walk was released on DVD with Man On Wire, the Academy Award-winning documentary on Petit's World Trade Center Twin Towers walk.

Ricketson directed the feature films Third Person Plural (1978), Candy Regentag (1989), Blackfellas (1994). His documentaries include Reflections (1973), Roslyn and Blagica Everyone Needs a Friend (1979), Born in Soweto (1994), Sleeping with Cambodia (1997), Backpacking Australia (2001), and Viva (2004).

In 1981 he became one of the founding members of the Australian Directors Guild. In the same year he directed one of the four episodes of the award-winning Australian miniseries Women of the Sun.

From around 1995, Ricketson made repeated trips to Cambodia to make a documentary film called Chanti’s World, about a girl growing up in the capital city Phnom Penh.

== Legal issues ==
=== Screen Australia ===
In July 2012 Ricketson sued Screen Australia for the sum of $1, for not following the specified process when assessing his film project for funding, and subsequently banning him from talking to the organisation in May of that year.

=== Cambodia ===
In 2014 Ricketson was fined six-million Cambodian riel (A$1,500) and given a suspended two-year prison sentence by a Phnom Penh court for threatening to broadcast accusations that a local branch of the Brisbane-based Citipointe Church sold children.

In June 2017, he was arrested while flying a drone at a Cambodia National Rescue Party rally in Phnom Penh, Cambodia, and charged with espionage, a charge he denied. He was held in Prey Sar prison and his trial began in a Phnom Penh court on 16 August 2018, with character testimony from Australian film director Peter Weir. On 31 August he was found guilty and sentenced to six years in prison. It was announced on 21 September 2018 that Cambodian authorities had pardoned Ricketson for the offence.

=== NSW Police ===
On 9 February 2026, Ricketson was tackled to the ground by six New South Wales Police officers while taking part in a Sydney rally protesting the visit by Israeli President Isaac Herzog to Australia. Ricketson sustained injuries to his arms and was held for several hours at Darlinghurst Police Station, but was released without charge.

== Selected filmography ==
- Third Person Plural (1978)
- Candy Regentag (1989)
- Blackfellas (1994)

== Awards ==
- AACTA Award for Best Adapted Screenplay, Blackfellas (1994)
- AACTA Award for Best Film, Reflections (1973)
- Alan Stout Award for Best Short Film, Reflections (1973)

== Personal life ==
Ricketson is the grandson of stockbroker Staniforth Ricketson. He has a son, Jesse, and is a surrogate father to Roxanne Holmes, whom he met "while researching a film project about street kids" in the 1980s.
