= Albie Thoms =

Australian film director, writer and producer

- Born: 28 July 1941; Sydney,, Australia
- Died: 28 November 2012 (aged 71); Sydney, Australia
- Education: University of Sydney
- Occupations: Film director, writer, producer

Albie Thoms (28 July 1941 – 28 November 2012) was an Australian film director, writer, and producer.

He was fundamental in pushing for and establishing the Australian cultural identity in the film industry, traditionally shaped by the BBC and Hollywood.

== Biography ==
Thoms was born in Sydney, New South Wales. He studied arts at the University of Sydney

He was nominated for at the 1979 AFI Awards for Best Original Screenplay for the drama film Palm Beach. He is best known for his work with Ubu Films, the Sydney Filmmakers’ Co-operative, and the Yellow House. He made a number of short films.

As well as Polemics for a New Cinema (1978), Thoms wrote Surfmovies, (2000) a history of the Australian surfing film, published by Shore Thing, Noosa. His memoir ‘My Generation’ (2012) was published shortly after his death by Media21 publishing.

He has also contributed to The Documentary Film in Australia publication as well as providing catalogue essays for Bohemians in the Bush (1991) and Belle-Ile: Monet, Russell and Matisse in Brittany (2001), both for AGNSW, and Then and Now and Everything in Between (2010), Mosman Art Gallery,

He died in Sydney on 28 November 2012, aged 71

== Partial filmography ==
The following list represents a partial filmography of Thoms:

Year	Title	Notes
1963	It Droppeth as the Gentle Rain	
1965	Poem 25	
1965	The Spurt of Blood	
1966	Man and His World	
1966	Rita and Dundi	
1966	Blunderball, or from Dr. Nofinger with Hate	
1967	Moon Virility	
1967	Bluto	
1967	The Film	
1967	Bolero	
1968	David Perry	
1969	Skippy the Bush Kangaroo	
1969	Marinetti	
1973	Sunshine City	
1980	Palm Beach	
1995	Akai Ghost Poems	
