= 2003 Australian Film Institute Awards =

Australian Film Institute Awards

45th Australian Film Institute Awards
- Date: 21 November 2003
- Site: Her Majesty's Theatre, Melbourne
- Hosted by: Tony Squires
- Directed by: Felicity Cockram

Highlights
- Best Film: Japanese Story
- Best Direction: Sue Brooks; Japanese Story
- Best Actor: David Wenham; Gettin' Square
- Best Actress: Toni Collette; Japanese Story
- Supporting Actor: David Ngoombujarra; Black and White
- Supporting Actress: Sacha Horler; Travelling Light
- Most awards: Feature film: Japanese Story (8)
- Most nominations: Feature film: Gettin' Square (14); Television: After the Deluge (8)

Television coverage
- Network: ABC

The 45th Annual Australian Film Institute Awards (generally known as the AFI Awards) were a series of awards presented by the Australian Film Institute (AFI). The awards celebrated the best in Australian feature film, television, documentary, and short film productions of 2003. The event was held at Her Majesty's Theatre, Melbourne, on 21 November 2003, and was hosted by Tony Squires. Stars presenting the awards included Geoffrey Rush, George Miller, Toni Collette, and Jason Donovan.

== Winners and nominees ==
The nominations were announced on 31 October 2003. Leading the feature film nominees was comedy crime caper Gettin' Square with a total of fourteen nominations across 12 of the 14 categories, equalling the record set by director Phillip Noyce's film Newsfront in 1978. After the Deluge, a miniseries about a father who is suffering from Alzheimer's and his three estranged sons who reluctantly come together to secure institutional care for him, gained the most television nominations with eight.

Despite the record number of nominations, Gettin' Square only won a single award, for David Wenham as best actor. Director, Sue Brooks's Japanese Story, about an Australian geologist and a Japanese businessman journeying into the Pilbara desert in Western Australia received eight awards, the most for any production. In the television category, the miniseries After The Deluge and medical-legal drama MDA, won three awards apiece.

== Controversies ==
There was some controversy at the ceremony, with almost half of the winners using their acceptance speeches to criticise the Australian government's proposal to cut cultural subsidies as part of a free trade agreement with the United States. Many arrived wearing yellow and green ribbons in protest against the agreement.

=== Feature Film ===
Best Film	Best Direction
Japanese Story – Sue Maslin, Sue Brooks, and Alison Tilson; Alexandra's Project – Julie Ryan and Domenico Procacci; Gettin' Square – Martin Fabinyi, Tim White, and Trish Lake; The Rage in Placid Lake – Marian Macgowan	Sue Brooks – Japanese Story; Paul Moloney – Crackerjack; Jonathan Teplitzky – Gettin' Square; Gregor Jordan – Ned Kelly
Best Original Screenplay	Best Adapted Screenplay
Japanese Story – Alison Tilson; Crackerjack – Mick Molloy and Richard Molloy; Gettin' Square – Chris Nyst; Travelling Light – Kathryn Millard	The Rage in Placid Lake – Tony McNamara; Blurred – Stephen Davis and Kier Shorey; Ned Kelly – John Michael McDonaugh; Teesh and Trude – Vanessa Lomma
Best Lead Actor	Best Lead Actress
David Wenham – Gettin' Square; Timothy Spall – Gettin' Square; Gotaro Tsunashima – Japanese Story; Heath Ledger – Ned Kelly	Toni Collette – Japanese Story; Helen Buday – Alexandra's Project; Susie Porter – Teesh and Trude; Rose Byrne – The Rage in Placid Lake
Best Supporting Actor	Best Supporting Actress
David Ngoombujarra – Black and White; David Field – Gettin' Square; Mitchell Butel – Gettin' Square; Orlando Bloom – Ned Kelly	Sacha Horler – Travelling Light; Helen Thomson – Gettin' Square; Melanie Griffith – The Night We Called It a Day; Miranda Richardson – The Rage in Placid Lake
Best Cinematography	Best Editing
Japanese Story – Ian Baker; Gettin' Square – Garry Phillips; Ned Kelly – Oliver Stapleton BSC; Travelling Light – Tristan Milani ACS	Japanese Story – Jill Bilcock; Alexandra's Project – Tania Nehme; Gettin' Square – Ken Sallows ASE; Ned Kelly – Jon Gregory ACE
Best Original Music Score	Best Sound
Japanese Story – Elizabeth Drake; Alexandra's Project – Graham Tardif; Gettin' Square – Chit Chat Von Loopin Stab, 3KShort; Travelling Light – Richard Vella	Japanese Story – Livia Ruzic, Peter Grace and Peter Smith; Alexandra's Project – James Currie, Andrew Plain, Nada Mikas and Rory McGregor; Gettin' Square – John Schiefelbein, Antony Gray and Ian McLoughlin; Ned Kelly – Gary Wilkins, Colin Miller AMPS, Adrian Rhodes and Chris Burden
Best Production Design	Best Costume Design
Ned Kelly – Steven Jones-Evans; Gettin' Square – Nicholas McCallum; Japanese Story – Paddy Reardon; The Night We Called It a Day –Michael Philips	Ned Kelly – Anna Borghesi; Black and White – Annie Marshall; Gettin' Square – Jackline Sassine; The Night We Called It a Day – Emily Seresin

=== Television ===
Best Drama Series	Best Comedy Series
MDA: Series 2 (ABC) – Denny Lawrence; Grass Roots: Series 2 (ABC) – John Eastway; Stingers: Series 6 (Nine Network) – John Wilde, Roger Le Mesurier and Roger Simpson; The Secret Life of Us: Series 3 (Network Ten) – Amanda Higgs	John Safran's Music Jamboree (SBS) – Selin Yaman and John Safran; Big Bite (Seven Network) – Michael Horrocks; CNNNN (ABC) – Mark Fennessy and Andrew Denton; Kath & Kim: Series 2 (ABC) – Gina Riley, Jane Turner and Mark Ruse
Best Telefeature or Mini Series	Best Light Entertainment Series
After The Deluge (Network Ten) – Richard Keddie, Andrew Knight and Andrew Wiseman; Black Jack (Network Ten) – Nick Murray and Sally Ayre-Smith; The Postcard Bandit (Nine Network) – Matt Carroll; The Shark Net (ABC) – Sue Taylor	Enough Rope with Andrew Denton (ABC) – Andrew Denton and Anita Jacoby; Micallef Tonight (Nine Network) – Shaun Micallef, Todd Abbott and Margaret Bashfield; The Fat: Series 6 (ABC) – Damian Davis and Nick Price; The Glass House: Season 3 (ABC) – Ted Robinson
Best Lead Actor	Best Lead Actress
Shane Bourne – MDA: Series 2 (ABC); Ray Barrett – After The Deluge (Network Ten); Geoff Morrell – Grass Roots: Series 2 (ABC); Glenn Robbins – Kath & Kim: Series 2 (ABC)	Angie Milliken – MDA: Series 2 (ABC); Jane Turner – Kath & Kim: Series 2 (ABC); Claudia Karvan – The Secret Life of Us: Series 3 (Network Ten); Deborah Mailman – The Secret Life of Us: Series 3 (Network Ten)
Best Guest or Supporting Actor	Best Guest or Supporting Actress
John Clayton – Grass Roots: Series 2, Episode 10 "By-Election" (ABC); Samuel Johnson – After The Deluge (Network Ten); Damien Richardson – The Secret Life of Us: Series 3, Episode 11: "The Day No Trumpets Sounded" (Network Ten); Francis Greenslade – Welcher & Welcher (ABC)	Essie Davis – After The Deluge (Network Ten); Maggie Dence – Always Greener: Series 2, Episode 9 "Understanding The Cry" (Seven Network); Sacha Horler – Grass Roots: Series 2, Episode 1 "Art" (ABC); Magda Szubanski – Kath & Kim: Series 2 (ABC)
Best Direction	Best Screenplay
Brendan Maher – After The Deluge (Network Ten); Ian Gilmour – Bootleg: Episode 2 (BBC); Peter Andrikidis – Grass Roots: Series 2, Episode 10 "By-Election" (ABC); Stephen Johnson – Out There: Episode 12 "Reilly Had a Little Goat" (ABC)	Geoffrey Atherden – Grass Roots: Series 2, Episode 10 "By-Election" (ABC); Andrew Knight – After The Deluge (Network Ten); Chris Taylor, Julian Morrow and Charles Firth – CNNNN: Episode 7 "Lunchgate" (ABC); Bill Garner – MDA: Series 2, Episode 9 "Crossing The Line" (ABC)
Best Children's Television Drama	
Out There (ABC) – Michael Bourchier; Bootleg (BBC) – Ewan Burnett; Don't Blame The Koalas (ABC) – Noel Price and Dennis Kiely; Worst Best Friends (Network Ten) – Sue Seeary	

=== Non-feature film ===
Best Documentary	Best Direction in a Documentary
Wildness – Michael McMahon; Painting with Light in a Dark World – Renata Schuman and Ellenor Cox; Silent Storm – Peter Butt and Rob McAuely; The Original Mermaid – Ian Collie	Sascha Ettinger-Epstein – Painting with Light in a Dark World; Wain Fimeri – Love Letters From a War; Peter Butt – Silent Storm; Scott Milwood – Wildness
Best Short Fiction Film	Best Short Animation
Cracker Bag – Glendyn Ivin; Preservation – Sofya Gollan; Roy Höllsdotter Live – Matthew Saville; The Visitor – Dan Castle	Harvie Krumpet – Adam Elliot; Cane Toad: What Happened To Baz? – David Clayton and Andrew Silke; Hello – Jonathan Nix; Mother Tongue – Susan Kim
Best Screenplay in a Short Film	Best Cinematography in a Non-Feature Film
Glendyn Ivin – Cracker Bag; Steven McGregor – Cold Turkey; Sofya Gollan – Preservation; Scott Pickett – The Rouseabout	Anthony Jennings – The Projectionist; Greig Fraser – Cracker Bag; Calvin Gardiner and Peter Butt – Silent Storm; Klaus Toft – The Navigators: Baudin vs Flinders
Best Editing in a Non-Feature Film	Best Sound in a Non-Feature Film
Rolland Gallois and Andrew Aristides – Painting with Light in a Dark World; Jack Hutchings – Cracker Bag; Geoff Hitchins – Roy Höllsdotter Live; Sally Fryer – The Original Mermaid	Jonathan Nix – Hello; Julian Ellingworth – Silent Storm; Doran Kipen, Mark Street and Cameron Davies – The Navigators: Baudin vs Flinders; Paul Charlier and Ian McLoughlin – The Projectionist

=== Additional Awards ===
Young Actor's Award	Best Foreign Film
Liam Hess – Don't Blame the Koalas (ABC); Emily Browning – After The Deluge (Network Ten); Mason Richardson – Teesh and Trude (SBS)	The Lord of the Rings: The Two Towers – Peter Jackson, Barrie M. Osborne and Fran Walsh; Bowling for Columbine – Charles Bishop, Jim Czarnecki, Michael Donovan, Kathleen Glynn and Michael Moore; The Hours – Robert Fox and Scott Rudin; Whale Rider – John Barnett, Frank Hübner and Tim Sanders
Open Craft AFI Award – Television	Open Craft AFI Award – Non Feature Film
John Safran's Music Jamboree (SBS) – John Safran (for Original Music); After The Deluge (Network Ten) – Cezary Skubiszewski (for Original Music); Big Bite (Seven Network) – Peta Hastings, Karchi Maygar and Natalie Vincentich (for Creative Make-Up); Bootleg (BBC) – Craig Barden ACS (for Cinematography)	The Brotherhood – Terry Carlyon (for Excellence in Research and Innovative Storytelling); Cold Turkey – John Moore (for Acting); Love Letters From a War – Wain Fimeri (for Dramatisation); Preservation – Margot Wilson and Elizabeth Mary Moore (for Production and Costume Design)

=== Individual Awards ===
Award	Winner
Byron Kennedy Award	Dion Beebe
Raymond Longford Award	Ted Robinson
Global Achievement Award	Geoffrey Rush
AFI Screenwriting Prize	Alison Tilson

== Multiple nominations ==
The following films received multiple nominations.

- 14 nominations: Gettin' Square
- 10 nominations: Japanese Story
- 9 nominations: Ned Kelly

== See also ==
- AACTA Awards
