= AACTA Award for Best Direction in a Documentary =

Australian film award

Best Direction in a Documentary AACTA Award
- Country: Australia
- Presented by: Australian Academy of Cinema and Television Arts (AACTA)
- First award: 1998
- Currently held by: Bob Connolly and Sophie Raymond, Mrs Carey’s Concert (2011)
- Website: http://www.aacta.org

The AACTA Award for Best Direction in a Documentary, is a documentary award presented by the Australian Academy of Cinema and Television Arts (AACTA) to the director of an Australian documentary film or television series. Prior to the establishment of the academy in 2011, the award was presented by the Australian Film Institute (AFI) at the annual Australian Film Institute Awards (more commonly known as the AFI Awards) from 1998 to 2010. The award is presented at the AACTA Awards Luncheon, a black tie event which celebrates achievements in film production, television, documentaries and short films.

== Winners and nominees ==
In the following table, winners are listed first, in boldface and highlighted in gold; those listed below the winner that are not in boldface or highlighted are the nominees.

Winner

=== AFI Awards (1998-2010) ===
| Year | Nominees(s) | Film |
|---|---|---|
| **1998** (40th) | **David Goldie** | **The Big House** |
| 1998 (40th) | Christopher Tuckfield | A Breath |
| 1998 (40th) | John Hughes | After Mabo |
| 1998 (40th) | Peter Butt | The Liners (for episode 3: "The Great Dual") |
| **1999** (41st) | **Maciej Wszelaki** | **Original Schtick** |
| 1999 (41st) | Maree Delofski | A Calcutta Christmas |
| 1999 (41st) | Curtis Levy | Hephzibah |
| 1999 (41st) | Tony Ayres | Sadness |
| **2000** (42nd) | **Tom Zubrycki** | **The Diplomat** |
| 2000 (42nd) | Terry Carlyon | A Death in the Family |
| 2000 (42nd) | Amiel Courtin-Wilson | Chasing Buddha |
| 2000 (42nd) | Wain Fimeri | Pozieres |
| **2001** (43rd) | **Dennis O'Rourke** | **Cunnamulla** |
| 2001 (43rd) | Bob Connolly and Robin Anderson | Facing the Music |
| 2001 (43rd) | Vanessa Gorman | Losing Layla |
| 2001 (43rd) | Andrew Wiseman | Wonderboy |
| **2002** (44th) | **Sherine Salama** | **A Wedding in Ramallah** |
| 2002 (44th) | Luigi Acquisto | East Timor - Birth of a Nation: Rosa's Story |
| 2002 (44th) | Michael Rubbo | Much Ado About Something |
| 2002 (44th) | Dennis K. Smith | Rainbow Bird & Monster Man |
| **2003** (45th) | **Sascha Ettinger-Epstein** | **Painting with Light in a Dark World** |
| 2003 (45th) | Wain Fimeri | Love Letters From a War |
| 2003 (45th) | Peter Butt | Silent Storm |
| 2003 (45th) | Scott Milwood | Wildness |
| **2004** (46th) | **Anna Broinowski** | **Helen's War: Portrait of a Dissident** |
| 2004 (46th) | Faramarz K. Rahber | Fahimeh’s Story |
| 2004 (46th) | Cathy Henkel | The Man Who Stole My Mother's Face |
| 2004 (46th) | Bentley Dean and Curtis Levy | The President Versus David Hicks |
| **2005** (47th) | **Janet Merewether** | **Jabe Babe – A Heightened Life** |
| 2005 (47th) | Kathy Drayton | Girl in a Mirror |
| 2005 (47th) | John Moore | Abortion, Corruption and Cops - The Bertram Wainer Story |
| 2005 (47th) | Klaus Toft | Killers in Eden |
| **2006** (48th) | **David Bradbury** | **Raul The Terrible** |
| 2006 (48th) | Alec Morgan | Hunt Angels |
| 2006 (48th) | Gillian Armstrong | Unfolding Florence - The Many Lives of Florence Broadhurst |
| 2006 (48th) | Polly Watkins | Vietnam Nurses |
| **2007** (49th) | **Bruce Petty** | **Global Haywire** |
| 2007 (49th) | Sally Regan and Anna Broinowski | Forbidden Lie$ |
| 2007 (49th) | Richard Smith | Crude |
| 2007 (49th) | Philippa Campey | Words From the City |
| **2008** (50th) | **Ian Darling** and **Sascha Ettinger-Epstein** | **The Oasis** |
| 2008 (50th) | Melissa Maclean and Luke Walker | Beyond Our Ken |
| 2008 (50th) | Fiona Cochrane | Rachel: A Perfect Life |
| 2008 (50th) | Randall Wood | Rare Chicken Rescue |
| **2009** (51st) | **Michael Davie** | **The Choir** |
| 2009 (51st) | Amiel Courtin-Wilson | Bastardy |
| 2009 (51st) | Rachel Perkins | First Australians (for episode 4: "There Is No Other Law") |
| 2009 (51st) | Shalom Almond | The Love Market |
| **2010** (52nd) | **Jacob Hickey** | **Inside the Firestorm** |
| 2010 (52nd) | Amanda Chang | A Thousand Encores: The Ballets Russes in Australia |
| 2010 (52nd) | Martin Butler and Bentley Dean | Contact |
| 2010 (52nd) | Charlie Hill-Smith | Strange Birds in Paradise - A West Papuan Story |

=== AACTA Awards (2012-present) ===
| Year | Nominees(s) | Film |
|---|---|---|
| **2011** **(1st)** | **Bob Connolly** and **Sophie Raymond** | **Mrs Carey's Concert** |
| 2011 (1st) | Bryan Mason and Sophie Hyde | Life in Movement |
| 2011 (1st) | Matthew Bate | Shut Up Little Man! An Audio Misadventure |
| 2011 (1st) | Tony Krawitz | The Tall Man |

== See also ==
- AACTA Awards
