= Margaret Chandler =

Margaret Chandler may refer to:

- Margaret Bailey Chandler (1929–1997), American community leader
- Elizabeth Margaret Chandler (1807–1834), American poet
- Bogle–Chandler case
- Who Killed Dr Bogle and Mrs Chandler?
