= Australian Film Institute Award for Best Foreign Film =

Australian film award

Best Foreign Film AACTA Award
- Country: Australia
- Presented by: Australian Film Institute (AFI)
- First award: 1992
- Final award: 2004
- Website: http://www.aacta.org

The Australian Film Institute Award for Best Foreign Film was an award presented by the Australian Film Institute (AFI), for a film made outside of Australia in English or non-English language. It was handed out at the Australian Film Institute Awards (known commonly as the AFI Awards), which are now the AACTA Awards after the establishment of the Australian Academy of Cinema and Television Arts (AACTA), by the AFI. The Award was handed out from 1992–2004.

== Winners and nominees ==
In the following table, films listed first in boldface and highlighted in gold are the winners. Those that are not in boldface or highlighted are the nominees.

Winner marked in a separate colour

Year	Film title	Original title	Country(ies)	Recipient(s)
**1992** (34th)	**Truly, Madly, Deeply**	**Truly, Madly, Deeply**	**United Kingdom**	**Robert Cooper**
**1993** (35th)	**The Crying Game**	**The Crying Game**	**United Kingdom**	**Stephen Woolley**
1993 (35th)	The Player	The Player	United States	David Brown, Michael Tolkin and Nick Wechsler
1993 (35th)	Raise the Red Lantern	Dà Hóng Dēnglóng Gāogāo Guà 大紅燈籠高高掛	China; Hong Kong; Taiwan	Chiu Fu-sheng
1993 (35th)	Husbands and Wives	Husbands and Wives	United States	Robert Greenhut
**1994** (36th)	**Four Weddings and a Funeral**	**Four Weddings and a Funeral**	**United Kingdom**	**Duncan Kenworthy**
1994 (36th)	Like Water for Chocolate	Como agua para chocolate	Mexico	Alfonso Arau
1994 (36th)	Schindler's List	Schindler's List	United States	Branko Lustig, Gerald R. Molen and Steven Spielberg
1994 (36th)	In the Name of the Father	In the Name of the Father	(Republic of Ireland) Ireland; United Kingdom	Jim Sheridan
**1995** (37th)	**Once Were Warriors**	**Once Were Warriors**	**New Zealand**	**Lee Tamahori**
1995 (37th)	Heavenly Creatures	Heavenly Creatures	New Zealand	Jim Booth and Peter Jackson
1995 (37th)	Priest	Priest	United Kingdom	George Faber and Josephine Ward
1995 (37th)	Pulp Fiction	Pulp Fiction	United States	Lawrence Bender
**1996** (38th)	**Fargo**	**Fargo**	**United States**	**Ethan Coen**
1996 (38th)	Burnt by the Sun	Utomlyonnye solntsem Утомлённые солнцем	Russia	Nikita Mikhalkov and Michael Seydoux
1996 (38th)	Dead Man Walking	Dead Man Walking	United States	Jon Kilik, Tim Robbins and Rudd Simmons
1996 (38th)	Trainspotting	Trainspotting	United Kingdom	Andrew Macdonald
**1997** (39th)	**Secrets & Lies**	**Secrets & Lies**	**United Kingdom**	**Simon Channing-Williams**
1997 (39th)	Breaking the Waves	Breaking the Waves	Denmark	Peter Aalbaek Jensen and Vibeke Windeløv
1997 (39th)	The English Patient	The English Patient	United Kingdom; United States	Saul Zaentz
1997 (39th)	Romeo + Juliet	Romeo + Juliet	United States	Baz Luhrmann and Gabriella Martinelli
**1998** (40th)	**L.A. Confidential**	**L.A. Confidential**	**United States**	**Curtis Hanson**, **Arnon Milchan** and **Michael G. Nathanson**
1998 (40th)	Kundun	Kundun	United States	Barbara De Fina
1998 (40th)	The Full Monty	The Full Monty	United Kingdom	Uberto Pasolini
1998 (40th)	The Ice Storm	The Ice Storm	United States	Ted Hope, James Schamus and Ang Lee
**1999** (41st)	**Life Is Beautiful**	**La vita è bella**	**Italy**	**Gianluigi Braschi** and **Elda Ferri**
1999 (41st)	Elizabeth	Elizabeth	United Kingdom	Tim Bevan, Eric Fellner and Alison Owen
1999 (41st)	The Thin Red Line	The Thin Red Line	United States	Robert Michael Giesler, Grant Hill and John Roberdeau
1999 (41st)	The Truman Show	The Truman Show	United States	Scott Rudin
**2000** (42nd)	**American Beauty**	**American Beauty**	**United States**	**Bruce Cohen** and **Dan Jinks**
2000 (42nd)	All About My Mother	Todo sobre mi madre	Spain	Agustín Almodóvar
2000 (42nd)	Being John Malkovich	Being John Malkovich	United States	Michael Stipe and Sandy Stern
2000 (42nd)	The Sixth Sense	The Sixth Sense	United States	Kathleen Kennedy, Frank Marshall and Barry Mendel
**2001** (43rd)	**Crouching Tiger, Hidden Dragon**	**Wòhǔ Cánglóng** 臥虎藏龍	**Taiwan**	**Ang Lee** and **James Schamus**
2001 (43rd)	Almost Famous	Almost Famous	United States	Ian Bryce and Cameron Crowe
2001 (43rd)	Billy Elliot	Billy Elliot	United Kingdom	Greg Brenman and Jon Finn
2001 (43rd)	In the Mood for Love	Huāyàng niánhuá 花樣年華	Hong Kong	Wong Kar-wai
**2002** (44th)	**The Lord of the Rings: The Fellowship of the Ring**	**The Lord of the Rings: The Fellowship of the Ring**	**New Zealand**	**Peter Jackson, Barrie M. Osborne, Tim Sanders and Fran Walsh**
2002 (44th)	A Beautiful Mind	A Beautiful Mind	United States	Brian Grazer and Ron Howard
2002 (44th)	Amélie	Le fabuleux destin d'Amélie Poulain	France	Claudie Ossard
2002 (44th)	Gosford Park	Gosford Park	United Kingdom; United States	Robert Altman, Bob Balaban and David Levy
**2003** (45th)	**The Lord of the Rings: The Two Towers**	**The Lord of the Rings: The Two Towers**	**New Zealand**	**Peter Jackson, Barrie M. Osborne and Fran Walsh**
2003 (45th)	Bowling for Columbine	Bowling for Columbine	United States	Charles Bishop, Jim Czarnecki, Michael Donovan, Kathleen Glynn and Michael Moore
2003 (45th)	The Hours	The Hours	United Kingdom; United States	Robert Fox and Scott Rudin
2003 (45th)	Whale Rider	Whale Rider	New Zealand	John Barnett, Frank Hübner and Tim Sanders
**2004** (46th)	**The Lord of the Rings: The Return of the King**	**The Lord of the Rings: The Return of the King**	**New Zealand**	**Peter Jackson, Barrie M. Osborne and Fran Walsh**
2004 (46th)	Eternal Sunshine of the Spotless Mind	Eternal Sunshine of the Spotless Mind	United States	Anthony Bregman and Steve Golin
2004 (46th)	Lost in Translation	Lost in Translation	Japan; United States	Sofia Coppola and Ross Katz
2004 (46th)	Mystic River	Mystic River	United States	Clint Eastwood, Judie G. Hoyt and Robert Lorenz

== See also ==
- AACTA Awards
- AACTA Award for Best Film
- AACTA International Award for Best Film
