= Cold Turkey (disambiguation) =

Going cold turkey means withdrawing from a habit or addiction abruptly.

"Cold Turkey" is a 1969 song by John Lennon.

Cold Turkey may also refer to:

== Film ==
- Cold Turkey (1951 film), an animated short film starring Pluto
- Cold Turkey (1971 film), a comedy by Norman Lear
- Cold Turkey (2003 film), an Australian film directed by Steven McGregor
- Cold Turkey (2013 film), an independent film starring Alicia Witt

== Other uses ==
- Cold Turkey (album), a 1964 live album by pianist Ray Bryant
- "Cold Turkey" (Bump in the Night), a television episode wherein a turkey comes to life
- "Cold Turkey" (Shameless), a 2009 television episode

== See also ==
- Turkey (bird)
- Turkey
