= Shinano no Kuni =

Official anthem of Nagano Prefecture, Japan

- 信濃の国
- Music score
- Prefectural song of Nagano Prefecture
- Lyrics: Asai Retsu, 1899
- Music: Kitamura Sueharu, 1900
- Adopted: 20 May 1968

Audio sample
- Shinano no Kuni: file; help

"Shinano no Kuni" (信濃の国) is the prefectural song of Nagano Prefecture, Japan, created for educational purposes. Because of its popular appearance in public areas such as train stations and TV programs, more than half of adults who grew up in the prefecture can sing at least one of its stanzas. Sometimes the song is used (half jestingly) to test one's patriotism to the region. The song was played during the opening ceremony of the 1998 Winter Olympics to accompany the Parade of Nations. Shinano no kuni is the Japanese name for the old Shinano Province, to which the current Nagano prefecture is contiguous.

The song was created in 1900, and was officially designated as Nagano's prefectural song on 20 May 1968. The lyrics were written by Asai Retsu (浅井洌), a Nagano-born teacher, and the tune was composed by Kitamura Sueharu (北村季晴).It consists of a total of six stanzas, the fourth having a different melody and tempo from the rest. It is said that the reason why the fourth verse is different is to add emotion.

The lyrics are divided into sections as follows: An overview of the geography of Nagano Prefecture mountains and rivers industry Historic Site/Scenic Beauty Notable people from Nagano Usui Pass and the railway (Shinetsu Main Line opened several years before the composition), concluding

== Lyrics ==
信濃の國は十州じつしうに 境さかひつらぬる國くににして
聳そびゆる山はいや高たかく 流ながるる川かははいや遠とほし
松本まつもと伊那いな佐久さく善光寺ぜんくわうじ 四よつの平たひらは肥沃ひよくの地ち
海うみこそなけれ物ものさはに よろづ足たらはぬ事ことぞなき

四方よもに聳そびゆる山々やま
〳
〵
は 御嶽おんたけ乘鞍のりくら駒こまヶ嶽たけ
淺間あさまはことに活火山くわつくはさん いづれも國くにのしづめなり
流ながれ淀よどまずゆく水みづは 北きたに犀川さいがは千曲川ちくまがは
南みなみに木曾きそ川天龍てんりう川 これ又また國くにの固かためなり

木曾きその谷たににはま木き茂しげり 諏訪すはの湖うみには魚うを多おほし
民たみのかせぎは紙かみ麻あさ綿わた 五穀ごこくの實みのらぬ里さとやある
しかのみならず桑くはとりて 蠶養こがひの業わざの打うちひらけ
細ほそきよすがも輕かろからぬ 國くにの命いのちを繋つなくなり

尋たづねまほしき園原そのはらや 旅たびのやどりの寐覺ねざめの里さと
木曾きその棧かけはしかけし世よも 心してゆけ粂路橋くめぢばし
くる人ひと多おほき筑摩つかまの湯ゆ 月つきの名なにたつ姨捨山をばすてやま
しるき名所めいしよとみやびをが 詩歌しいかによみてぞ傳つたへたる

旭將軍しやうぐん義仲よしなかも 仁科にしなの五郎ごろう信盛のぶもりも
春臺しゆんだい太宰だざい先生せんせいも 象山ぞうざん佐久間さくま先生せんせいも
皆みなこの國くにの人にして 文武ぶんぶの譽ほまれたぐひなく
山やまと聳そびえて世よに仰あふぎ 川かはと流ながれて名なはつきず

吾妻わがつまはやと日本武やまとたけ 嘆なげき給たまひし碓氷山うすひやま
穿うがつ隧道とんねる二十六 夢ゆめにもこゆる滊車きしやの道みち
道ひとすぢに學まなびなば 昔むかしの人にや劣おとるべき
古來こらい山河さんがの秀ひいでたる 國くには偉人じんのあるならひ

== See also ==
- List of Prefecture songs of Japan
