= Tinsagu nu Hana =

Traditional Okinawan song

Song
- Language: Okinawan
- Genre: Okinawan folk

Audio sample
- file; help

Tinsagu nu Hana (てぃんさぐぬ花), also Chinsagu nu Hana (ちんさぐぬ花), is an Okinawan song about traditional Ryukyuan values such as filial piety and other Confucian teachings in the Okinawan language.

== Description ==
Tinsagu nu Hana sheet music for Sanshin

The title of the song can be translated as "The Balsam Flowers". The song is an Okinawan children's song; Okinawan children would squeeze the sap from balsam flowers to stain their fingernails as a way to ward off evil. The lyrics of the song are Confucian teachings. Of the first six verses, the first three relate to filial piety, while the latter three refer to respecting one's body and one's goals. Each verse has exactly the same number of notes using language and meter devices that are uniquely Okinawan, called Ryūka.

The Okinawa Prefectural government designated "Tinsagu nu Hana" as "Okinawa Prefecture's favorite song" on March 18, 2012, following a public survey. It was subsequently made an official symbol of Okinawa Prefecture, making it the prefecture's second musical symbol alongside the "Song of Okinawa Prefecture".

== Lyrics ==
The last four of the ten verses are missing.

Okinawan

てぃんさぐぬ花や
爪先に染みてぃ
親ぬゆし事や
肝に染みり

天ぬ群星や
読みば読まりしが
親ぬゆし言や
読みやならん

夜走らす舟や
子ぬ方星見当てぃ
我ん生ちぇる親や
我んどぅ見当てぃ

宝玉やてぃん
磨かにば錆す
朝夕肝磨ち
浮世渡ら

誠する人や
後や何時迄ん
思事ん叶てぃ
千代ぬ栄い

なしば何事ん
なゆる事やしが
なさぬ故からどぅ
ならぬ定み

Transliteration

Tinsagu nu hana ya
Chimisachi ni sumiti
Uya nu yushigutu ya
Chimu ni sumiri

Tin nu muribushi ya
Yumiba yumarishi ga
Uya nu yushigutu ya
Yumiyanaran

Yuru harasu funi ya
Ninufabushi miati
Wan nacheru uya ya
Wan du miati

Takaradama yati n
Migakaniba sabisu
Asayu chimu migachi
Uchi yu watara

Makutu suru hitu ya
Atu ya ichi madi n
Umukutu n kanati
Chiyu nu sakai

Nashiba nangutu n
Nayurugutu yashi ga
Nasanu yui kara du
Naranu sadami

English translation

Just as my fingernails
Are stained with the pigment from balsam flowers
My heart is painted
With the teachings of my parents

Although the stars in the sky
Are countable
The teachings of my parents
Are not

Just as ships that run in the night
Are guided to safety by the North Star
I am guided by my parents
Who gave birth to me and watch over me

There's no point in possessing magnificent jewelry
If you don't maintain it
People who maintain their bodies
Will live life wonderfully

The desires of the person who lives sincerely
Will always run true
And as a result
She will prosper

You can do anything
If you try
But you can't
If you don't

== Popular culture ==
Ryuichi Sakamoto used the song in the album Beauty. According to Felicity Collins of La Trobe University, this was the initial time that the song was "appropriated for a ‘world music’ audience".

It is a song used in the soundtrack of the 2003 Australian film Japanese Story. Shelley Scown was the vocalist, while Elizabeth Drake did the orchestral work. The song is used in the film's ending, where the protagonist, Sandy, watches an aircraft, which is carrying the body of a Japanese man, Hiromitsu Tachibana, whom she grows to know throughout the film, taxiing and preparing to take off. Collins wrote that some movie critics from Japan perceived the usage of the song as "a contentious issue" because the song specifically has an Okinawan character and yet is not something generally related to Japan, and "secondly because the fragility and beauty of this song, about upholding Okinawan identity, seems incongruous in an Australian film".
