= Sue Maslin =

Australian film producer

Sue Maslin AO
- Born: 1958 or 1959 (age 65–66)
- Other names: Susan Mary Maslin
- Occupation(s): Film and documentary producer
- Years active: 1988–present
- Notable credit(s): Road to Nhill (1997) Japanese Story (2003) and The Dressmaker (2015)

Susan Mary Maslin AO (born 1958 or 1959) is an Australian screen producer. She is best known for her feature films Road to Nhill (1997), Japanese Story (2003), and The Dressmaker (2015), but has produced or executive produced more documentary films than fiction features. She is co-founder of the company Film Art Media, established in 2008 with her creative and business partner Daryl Dellora, based in Melbourne.

== Early life and education ==
Susan Mary Maslin was born in 1958 or 1959, and raised on a sheep station north of Jerilderie in rural New South Wales. She regularly participated in the horse-riding competition at the Yanco bush picnic, and won it twice. She attended boarding school at St Margaret's School in Melbourne. The author of The Dressmaker, Rosalie Ham, also from Jerilderie, attended the same school, a few years ahead of Maslin.

Initially graduating with a Bachelor of Science from Australian National University and intending to do an honours year in zoology, Maslin instead switched to media studies at the Canberra College of Advanced Education (CCAE), after being attracted by the film posters in the building. Her only exposure to media so far had been as a member of the Women's Broadcasting Collective at the community radio station 2XX, but she gained entry as one of four full-time students at the faculty. The course had a focus on film history rather than practice, and she graduated with a Graduate Diploma in Media in 1983 after a year of study. It was at CCAE that Maslin met Daryl Dellora, her long-term creative and business partner, who was a fellow student in the Graduate Diploma of Media Studies.

Politicised on campus by the birth of second wave feminism in Australia, Maslin started what would become a lifelong fight for women's rights. Maslin was involved with the Women Against Rape in War group, some of whom were arrested and charged in Canberra for using ANZAC Day to protest rape being used as a weapon in war in 1981. In 1983, she and Frances Sutherland produced and directed a video called "More than one day of the year". Maslin wrote the music and lyrics for a song was recorded by the rock band Domestic Dirt in 1982.

Later in her career, in 2013, Maslin completed the two-year Master of Screen Arts and Business degree at the Australian Film, Television and Radio School (AFTRS). She did this with the specific goal of learning how to create a business plan in order to attract private capital and for a feature film, before producing The Dressmaker.

== Career ==
Maslin wrote, directed, and produced her first feature documentary Thanks Girls and Goodbye (1988), about the Australian Land Army – the women who worked on farms during the Second World War and supported the war effort through food production. She then went on to produce the hour-long documentary Mr Neal Is Entitled to Be an Agitator (1991), co-written and directed by Daryl Dellora, about Lionel Murphy's battle to retain his position on the High Court of Australia. The film was nominated for Best Documentary at the Australian Film Institute Award in 1992. A Senses of Cinema reviewer wrote in 2017 "in the eyes of this viewer, the film was able to capture something greater than the circumstances that surrounded Lionel Murphy during his lifetime".

Conspiracy, a 1994 documentary about the 1978 Sydney Hilton Hotel bombing, was produced by Maslin, and directed and co-written by Dellora.

She produced her first feature drama, Road to Nhill (1997), with director Sue Brooks and screenwriter Alison Tilson, which won Best Feature Film at the Thessaloniki International Film Festival in 1997.

In 1998 Maslin produced feature documentary The Highest Court, which shows first-hand the characters and drama of the High Court of Australia. Maslin then went on to tell the story of Jørn Utzon, architect of the Sydney Opera House, in The Edge of Possible (1998). This film won the Golden Plaque at the Chicago International Television Competition.

Maslin teamed up again with director Sue Brooks and writer Alison Tilson on Japanese Story (2003), which won many awards, including the 2003 Australian Film Institute Best Feature Film. She executive produced the 2006 feature film Irresistible starring Susan Sarandon. She then produced and executive produced a number of Australian documentaries, includingHunt Angels (producer; won the 2006 Australian Film Institute Best Feature Documentary Film), Celebrity: Dominick Dunne (producer), Michael Kirby: Don't Forget the Justice Bit (producer), Breaking the News (executive producer) and Ringbalin: Breaking the Drought (executive producer).

Maslin produced The Dressmaker, directed by Jocelyn Moorhouse, released in 2015. Starring Kate Winslet, Judy Davis, Liam Hemsworth, and Hugo Weaving, the film was based on the book of the same title written by Rosalie Ham. The film was one of the most successful in Australian history, grossing $20 million at the box office and garnered the highest number of nominations at the 2015 Australian Academy of Cinema and Television Arts (AACTA) Awards, winning five including the People's Choice Award for Favourite Australian Film. In 2021 Maslin said of The Dressmaker that it was "the most exhilarating project I've worked on, as well as the most stressful" (she said that she had often referred to it as The Stressmaker at the time), and she was also proud that it had "paved the way for so many other female-driven films".

Maslin produced and/or executive produced the feature documentary Harry Seidler: Modernist (2017); comedy series Other People's Problems (2017), and the documentary Paper Trails (2017).

The Show Must Go On (2019) is a documentary about mental health that screened on ABC TV, although it did not have all of the associated launch events that were planned owing to the beginning of the COVID-19 pandemic in Australia. Brazen Hussies (2020; by filmmakers Philippa Campey, Andrea Foxworthy, and Catherine Dwyer) is a feature documentary about second-wave feminism in Australia, which was screened at 56 cinemas in Australia, lasting for three months on the big screen, after having great difficulty in getting it financed.

She produced two documentaries about the life and work of film editor Jill Bilcock, both released in 2017. Jill Billcock: The Art Of Film Editing was made for ABC Television, and won an SAE ATOM Awards in 2018. Jill Bilcock: Dancing the Invisible (78 mins), which was released in cinemas, is a feature documentary film, directed, written, co-produced, and edited by Axel Grigor, and executive produced by Maslin. The film won the Audience Award at the Adelaide Film Festival.

Maslin and her company executive produced a documentary about Courtney Barnett called Anonymous Club. The film was directed by Danny Cohen, who had collaborated with Barnett on several of her music videos previously. The film premiered at the Melbourne International Film Festival in August 2021, and screened at a number of film festivals before being released in cinemas in March 2022. It was also broadcast on ABC Television, and is available on DVD.

The Little Qipao Shop, directed by Clara Law and Eddie Fong, was under development in 2023.

The Search For The Palace Letters, a feature documentary about Jenny Hocking's legal battle against the Australian Government and Queen Elizabeth II to access the palace letters (relating to the dismissal of Australian prime minister Gough Whitlam), was broadcast on ABC TV in January 2024.

== Other activities ==
Maslin is also a distributor of independent documentary films, through her company Film Art Media, established in 2008 with Daryl Dellora and based in Melbourne. She said of the company "Our goal has always been to connect ideas with people, and we do that through a variety of ways. We're not just in the business of producing and making content. We’re actually in the business of developing intellectual property and finding ways to connect that with people. So, Film Art Media is actually a film rights management and distribution company."

In the late 1980s, Maslin co-founded Women in Film and Television (Victoria), seeking to address gender bias in the film industry, and as of 2024 is patron of WIFT.

From 2011 to 2021 she was president of the Natalie Miller Fellowship, an organisation supporting the professional leadership of women in all sectors of the Australian screen industry.

She has served on numerous boards, including the Australian Film Institute, Film Victoria, and Adelaide Film Festival, and encourages women to take up positions on boards in the screen industry, where they are under-represented. As of December 2024 she is deputy chair of Documentary Australia.

In October 2021, Maslin was a member of an industry group that developed the Australian Feature Film Summit, an online meeting to grow the success of the Australian feature film sector.

In 2023, Maslin was a guest speaker at the Australian International Documentary Conference.

She is the founder and course leader of a Creative Leadership program, a workshop lasting two days, at Compton School, in Melbourne, "the first business school for creatives".

== Awards and honours ==
Maslin was the inaugural recipient of the Jill Robb Award for Outstanding leadership, achievement and service to the Victorian screen industry in 2012.

She has been adjunct professor (an honorary position) at the RMIT School of Media and Communication, and adjunct fellow at Swinburne University School of Film and Television. In 2017 she was awarded the RMIT University Medal for her services as adjunct professor.

In 2018 she was inducted onto the Victorian Honour Roll of Women.

In June 2019 she was made an Officer of the Order of Australia for "distinguished service to the Australian film industry as a producer, and through roles with professional bodies". At that time, she was Charles Herschell Industry Fellow at Swinburne University. Later that year, she was the recipient of the Alumni Excellence Award - Faculty of Arts and Design from Canberra University.

In 2021, Maslin won the Chauvel Award, which acknowledges significant contribution to the Australian screen industry.

== Personal life ==
Maslin is friends with author Rosalie Ham, with whom she plays golf.

== Selected filmography ==
Year	Film	Genre	Role
1988	Thanks Girls and Goodbye	documentary	producer
1991	Mr Neal Is Entitled to Be an Agitator	documentary	producer
1993	Black River	opera film	co-producer
1993	Koories and Cops	documentary	producer
1994	Conspiracy	documentary	producer
1997	Road to Nhill	feature film	producer
1998	The Highest Court	documentary	producer
1998	The Edge of the Possible	documentary	producer
2000	A Mirror to the People	documentary	producer
2003	Japanese Story	feature film	producer
2005	The Life, Times and Travels of the Extraordinary Vice-Admiral, William Bligh	documentary	producer
2005	Irresistible	feature film	executive producer
2006	Hunt Angels	documentary	producer
2008	Celebrity: Dominick Dunne	documentary	executive producer
2010	Re-enchantment	documentary	producer
2010	Michael Kirby – Don't Forget The Justice Bit	documentary	producer
2011	Coral Rekindling Venus	transmedia work	producer
2013	Ringbalin	documentary	executive producer
2013	Encounters	documentary	executive producer
2015	The Dressmaker	feature film	producer
2015	Harry Seidler: Modernist	documentary	producer
2016	Behind The Seams: The Making of The Dressmaker	documentary	director
2017	Paper Trails	documentary	executive producer
2017	Jill Bilcock – Dancing The Invisible	documentary	executive producer
2017	Jill Bilcock – The Art of Editing	documentary	executive producer
2019	The Show Must Go On	documentary	producer
2020	Ablaze	documentary	executive producer
2020	Why Did She Have to Tell The World?	documentary	executive producer
2020	Brazen Hussies	documentary	executive producer
2021	Anonymous Club	documentary	executive producer
