= Nicholas Hope =

British-born Australian actor (born 1958)

- Born: 25 December 1958 (age 67); Manchester, England
- Education: University of Sydney
- Occupation: Actor
- Known for: Bad Boy Bubby (1993)

Nicholas Hope (Manchester, 25 December 1958) is a British-born Australian actor, director, and teacher of acting. He became known for his performance as the lead role in the 1993 film Bad Boy Bubby, for which he won several awards.

== Early life and education ==
Nicholas Hope was born in Manchester, England. His family emigrated to the steel and shipbuilding town of Whyalla in South Australia, where he grew up.

In 2010, he earned a PhD in performance studies at the University of Sydney.

== Career ==
=== Music ===
Hope's first foray into live performance was as a bass player in a variety of rock bands in the 1970s and 1980s.

=== Acting, writing, and directing ===
He started his acting career on stage, working in many productions for the State Theatre Company of South Australia. He starred in a short film, and then got his big break when he played the lead role of Bubby in 1993 cult crime comedy-drama film Bad Boy Bubby, written and directed by Rolf de Heer. The role won him several best actor accolades, at the Australian Film Institute Awards, the Venice Film Festival in 1993, and France's Valenciennes Film Festival in 1995.

In 1998, Hope was nominated for best supporting actor at the Amanda Awards for his performance in the Norwegian film En dag til i solen (1998).

Subsequent film credits include The Goddess of 1967 (2000), alongside Rose Byrne; family film Scooby-Doo (2002), opposite Sarah Michelle Gellar and Freddie Prinze Jr.; The Night We Called It a Day (2003), with Joel Edgerton, Dennis Hopper and Melanie Griffith; creature thriller Anacondas: The Hunt for the Blood Orchid (2004); and Australian drama film Lost and Found (2005). Later films include The Daughter (2015), with Sam Neill and Geoffrey Rush; The School (2018); The Invisible Man (2020) alongside Elisabeth Moss and directed by Leigh Whannell; Moon Rock for Monday (2020) and The Drover's Wife (2021), opposite Leah Purcell.

He played lead roles in the 2012 films Redd Inc and Double Happiness Uranium. He received a Film Critics Circle of Australia nomination for best actor in a supporting role for his role as Joseph in Ivan Sen's 2023 film, Limbo.

Hope has also starred in numerous television series. He made early appearances in G.P., Blue Heelers, Farscape and Beastmaster. He starred in the award-winning 2001 miniseries Changi, as well as Gallipoli (2014) and Picnic at Hanging Rock (2018). His other television credits include Miss Fisher's Murder Mysteries, Offspring, Janet King, Ash Vs Evil Dead, Operation Buffalo, The Twelve, The Secrets She Keeps, The Messenger, The Artful Dodger, Black Snow and Ten Pound Poms.

Hope is also a writer, director, and producer. He made his writer/director debut with the play Little Gods in 2013. The following year, he directed Four Places for Outhouse Theatre, and in 2015 he directed his own play Five Properties of Chainmale for Griffin Theatre Company. He directed the short film Like Gold (2017), and produced the 2019 short film The Reckoning of Christian Spencer.

=== Teaching ===
In 2014, he was teacher of direction and acting for film, at the Sydney Film School, and was head of acting at the International Screen Academy, Sydney.

== Other activities ==
Hope recounted his experiences in the film industry – including his failure to secure main roles – in his 2004 memoir Brushing the Tip of Fame.

A portrait of Hope appears in the National Portrait Gallery.

== Filmography ==
=== Film ===
Year	Title	Role	Notes
1989	Confessor Caressor	Michael Freely	
1993	Bad Boy Bubby	Bubby	
1994	Exile	MacKenzie	
1995	The Life of Harry Dare	Kevin	
1996	Little White Lies		
1996	North Star	Sheriff Lamont	
1996	Lust and Revenge	Karl-Heinz Applebaum	
1997	Applied Mathematics: Questions 1 to 10	John May	Short film
1997	Henry Fool	Father Hawkes	
1998	En dag til i solen	Windy	
1999	The Darkest Light	Father Mark	
2000	Når mørket er forbi	Edvin	
2000	Mother Said (a Year Younger)		Short film
2000	The Goddess of 1967	Grandpa	
2001	Happy Mother's Day	Dad	Short film
2002	Harvey		Short film
2002	Scooby-Doo	Old Man Smithers	
2003	Paradise Found	Maurrin	
2003	The 13th House	Man from the 14th Floor	
2003	The Flaming Brain	Eric	Short film
2003	The Night We Called It a Day	Phil	
2003	Collier Brothers Syndrome	Langley Collier	Short film
2004	Anacondas: The Hunt for the Blood Orchid	Christian Van Dyke	
2006	Uro	Dealeren	
2006	Sharp Turn	The Stranger	Short film
2006	Lost and Found	Ebeneezer Wrench	
2007	Bitter Flowers (aka Varg Veum - Bitre blomster)	Warren Donaldson	
2008	Lønsj	Reataurantør	
2008	En perfekt dag for golf	Julius the English golfer	Short film
2008	Ovum		Short film
2010	The Passport	Inspector Florez	Short film
2010	Complicity	Man	Short film
2010	All at Sea	Eric	
2012	Butterflies	Dalton Hearst	Short film
2012	Redd Inc.	Thomas Reddmann	
2012	Decrepit	Lawrence Wrinkle	Short film
2013	Double Happiness Uranium	Reuben Henschke	
2013	Greg's First Day	Bernard	Short film
2014	Permafrost	Max	Short film
2014	Fade	Gerry	Short film
2015	The Daughter	Peterson	
2015	Truth	Marcel Matley	
2016	Sandwich	Larry	Short film
2017	Maurice's Symphony	Mr Ferk	Short film
2017	Event Zero	Langston Charlesworth	
2018	The School	Dr. Peter Masuta	
2018	Book Week	Ken Cutler	
2018	Slam	Pete the Journalist	
2019	Dark Place	Boss	Anthology film, segment: "Scout"
2019	Henry Needs a New Home	Henry	Short film
2019	Foreclosure	Haywood	Short film
2020	The Invisible Man	Head Doctor	
2020	Moon Rock for Monday	The Bobbins	
2020	Over the Edge	Officer Blaze	Short film
2020	The Story of Lee Ping	Slater	Short film
2021	The Drover's Wife	Judge Eisenmangher	
2021	The Suspect	Detective Carver	Short film
2021	Collectors	Sebastian	Short film
2022	The Home Team	Darren	Short film
2022	Lustration VR – Series 1		Short film
2022	Lean	Robert	Short film
2023	Limbo	Joseph	
2023	Contagion of Fear	Langston Charlesworth	
2023	Pasifika Drift	Darryl	Short film
2024	Exposure	Glen	Short film
2024	Kangaroo Island	Barnaby Roberts	
2024	Electric	Ugo Cerletti	Short film
2025	The Trial	Milton	Short film
2026	Leviticus	Deliverance Preacher	

=== Television ===
Year	Title	Role	Notes
1987	Frontier	Sir George Pipps	Miniseries, 3 episodes
1994	Blue Heelers	Father Leary	1 episode
1994	G.P.	Ray	1 episode
1996	Little White Lies	Barrett	TV movie
1996	Eldorado	Rocko	TV movie
1998	Getting Hurt	Edgar / Viola's husband	TV movie
1998	Bugs	Yerevenkian	1 episode
2000	Beastmaster	Khadro	Episode: "Heart Like a Lion"
2000–2001	Farscape	Akkpr / Kreetago	5 episodes
2001	Changi	Guillaume Koper	Miniseries, 6 episodes
2002	Don't Blame the Koalas	Video Shop Owner	1 episode
2004	Fallen	Chief Supt, Edridge	TV movie
2005	Grange		TV movie short
2006	Who Killed Dr Bogle and Mrs Chandler?	Geoffrey Chandler	TV movie
2007	Varg Veum	Warren Donaldson	1 episode
2008	Resistance	Stephen Hope	1 episode
2008	The Prime Minister is Missing	William McMahon	TV documentary film
2009	Rogue Nation	Judge Advocate Richard Atkins	1 episode
2009	3 Acts of Murder	Harry Manning	TV movie
2010	Rake	Professor Aden Sinclair	1 episode
2011	Wild Boys	Morris McLardy	1 episode
2011	The Bedou Key	Bedouin Brother	Video short
2013	Offspring	Tadgh Reid	2 episodes
2013	Miss Fisher's Murder Mysteries	Geoffrey Spall	1 episode
2015	Gallipoli	Major General Walter Braithwaite	7 episodes
2015	Mary: The Making of a Princess	Per Thornitt	TV movie
2016	Janet King	Justice Felton	2 episodes
2016	Soul Mates	Caveman Bob	6 episodes
2016	Ash vs Evil Dead	Professor Raymond Knowby	Season 2, 2 episodes
2017	Cleverman	Dr. Mitchell	3 episodes
2018	Chosen	The Box Maker	2 episodes
2018	Picnic at Hanging Rock	Colonel Fitzhubert	Miniseries, 4 episodes
2018	Jade of Death	Wilkins	6 episodes
2019	Random and Whacky	Nigel	10 episodes
2019	The Hunting	Principal Fischer	1 episode
2019	Les Norton	Priest	Miniseries, 1 episode
2020	Operation Buffalo	Dr Breston	5 episodes
2020	Deadhouse Dark	David Souris	2 episodes
2020; 2022	The Secrets She Keeps	Brother Bowler	5 episodes
2021	Born to Spy	Mr Potts	6 episodes
2022	The Twelve	Mr Isaacs	1 episode
2023	Crazy Fun Park	Neville Moore	1 episode
2023	The Messenger	Bernie	Miniseries, 2 episodes
2023	The Artful Dodger	Justice Micawber	2 episodes
2023–2025	Black Snow	Tommy Cormack / Tommy Doyle	6 episodes
2024	Nautilus	Dr Skinny	1 episode
2025	Ten Pound Poms	Stanley	1 episode

== Theatre ==
=== As cast ===
Year	Title	Role	Notes	Ref.
1989	The Rover		STCSA	
1993	The School for Scandal	Snake	Playhouse, Adelaide with STCSA	
1996	Simpatico	Vinnie	Wharf Theatre, Sydney with STC	
2004	Bima & Bramati	Bima (lead)	Det Apne Theater, Oslo / Traverse Theatre, Edinburgh	
2005	This Little Piggy	The Eagle	Wharf Theatre, Sydney with STC	
2006	The Colour of Panic	Balder (lead)	Sydney Opera House, Det Apne Theater, Oslo with Splinter Theatre Company	
2007	2,000 Feet Away	Byron	Belvoir St Theatre with B Sharp & Frogbattleship	
2010	Way to Heaven	Red Cross Representative	Stables Theatre, Sydney with Ride On Theatre / Griffin Theatre Company	
2012	The Mousetrap	Major Metcalf	Australian tour	

=== As writer ===
Year	Title	Role	Notes	Ref.
2006	The Colour of Panic	Balder (lead)	Sydney Opera House, Det Apne Theater, Oslo with Splinter Theatre Company	
2013	Little Gods	Writer / Director	May Day Playwrights Festival	
2014	Four Places	Director	Tap Gallery, Sydney with Outhouse Theatre Company	
2014	The Dixie Swim Club	Writer	Heidelberg Theatre Company	
2015	Five Properties of Chainmale	Writer / Director	Stables Theatre, Sydney with Griffin Theatre Company	
2021	Always a Bridesmaid	Writer	Pavilion Theatre, Castle Hill with Castle Hill Players	
2022	Till Beth Do Us Part	Writer	The 1812 Theatre, Ferntree Gully with Theatrematters	

== Awards and nominations ==
Year	Work	Award	Category	Result	Ref.
1994	Bad Boy Bubby	Australian Film Institute Awards	Best Actor in a Leading Role	Won	
	Bad Boy Bubby	Australian Cinematographers Society		Won	
1993	Bad Boy Bubby	Venice Film Festival	CIAC (Popular) Prize for Best Performance	Won	
1995	Bad Boy Bubby	Valenciennes Film Festival	Best Actor	Won	
	The Colour of Panic	100 0g Nå’ Ibsen Centenary	Writing Prize	Won	
2018	Jade of Death	Denver Series-Fest	Best Actor	Won	
2024	Limbo	Film Critics Circle of Australia	Best Actor in a Supporting Role	Nominated	
