= Natalie Miller =

Australian film distributor, exhibitor and producer

Natalie Rona Miller AO is an Australian film distributor, exhibitor and producer. She is known as the founder of film distribution house Sharmill Films, and the Melbourne theatres Longford Cinema and Cinema Nova.

== Film industry career ==
Miller studied at Methodist Ladies' College, Melbourne, and then completed an arts degree at the University of Melbourne. She began her career working in journalism and public relations at the Australian Broadcasting Corporation, then entered the film industry working on public relations for the Melbourne Film Festival for 17 years. In the mid-1960s, she was so impressed by Luis Buñuel's surrealist film The Exterminating Angel, which had shown at the festival, that she purchased the Australian distribution rights herself and exhibited it at the Palais Theatre in Melbourne to give the film a wider audience. Following the success of her first foray into film exhibition, Miller founded Sharmill Films in 1967, which specialises in the distribution of arthouse films in Australia.

Miller also founded two cinemas in Melbourne: the Longford Cinema in South Yarra, which closed in 2005 after Village Cinemas opened a multiplex at The Jam Factory; and Cinema Nova, an arthouse cinema in Carlton (co-founded with Barry Peake) which began with two screens and has now expanded to 16.

== Recognition and awards ==
- 2001: Medal of the Order of Australia, "for service to the Australian film industry, particularly the production, distribution and exhibition of quality film"
- 2003: Chevalier dans l'Ordre des Arts et des Lettres, for services to the promotion of French culture in Australia
- 2011: Foundation of the Natalie Miller Fellowship
- 2013: Officer of the Order of Australia, "For distinguished service to the film industry through promotion of screen culture, as a mentor to emerging film-makers, particularly women, and contributions to advisory and professional organisations"
- 2015: Screen Producers Australia Lifetime Achievement Award
- 2017: Victorian Honour Roll of Women

=== Natalie Miller Fellowship ===
The Natalie Miller Fellowship (NMF), named in honour of Miller and supported by Universal Pictures, is an organisation supporting the professional leadership of women in all sectors of the Australian screen industry. The annual fellowship was launched on 21 June 2011 by film critic Margaret Pomeranz in Melbourne, with guests including Geoffrey Rush and Julia Blake. The fellowship is worth up to $20,000, granted to "to a recipient to pursue leadership development opportunities focused on building and enhancing their leadership capabilities and creating positive outcomes for the industry as a whole".

Producer Sue Maslin was president of the organisation from 2011 to 2021. As of December 2024, Sasha Close is president, and Carol Schwartz is patron.
