= The Big House (documentary film) =

1997 documentary film

- Directed by: David Goldie
- Written by: David Goldie
- Produced by: David Goldie
- Narrated by: David Goldie
- Release date: 1997
- Running time: 198 minutes
- Country: Australia
- Language: English

The Big House is a 1997 Australian documentary film created by David Goldie. It looks at Australia's justice system and is made up of three parts. The first is titled Out of Sight, Out of Mind and is a re-edited version of his 1987 documentary of the same name where he looked at life in prison. The second part From the Inside returns to many of the prisoners he spoke to ten years ago. The third is Going Straight looks at why some ex prisoners go straight and some reoffend. It screened on the ABC in October 1997.

== Awards ==
- 1998 Australian Film Institute Awards
  - Best Direction in a Documentary - David Goldie - won
