= The School (film) =

Australian film

- Directed by: Storm Ashwood
- Written by: Tessa Alana; Storm Ashwood
- Produced by: Jim Robison at Lunar Pictures & Blake Northfield at Bronte Pictures
- Starring: Milly Alcock; Nicholas Hope; Will McDonald; Texas Watterston; Jack Ruwald; Alexia Santosuosso
- Edited by: Marcus D'Arcy; David Ngo
- Music by: Michael Lira
- Distributed by: Vertical Entertainment
- Release date: October 26, 2018
- Running time: 86 minutes
- Country: Australia
- Language: English
- Budget: US $1,850,000
- Box office: US $64,760

The School (also known as The Haunting) is an Australian horror and psychological thriller film, directed by Storm Ashwood and released in 2018. The film stars Milly Alcock, Will McDonald, Nicholas Hope, Megan Drury, Texas Watterston, Jack Ruwald and Alexia Santosuosso and it screened at the Vision Splendid Film Festival. The film was produced by Jim Robison of Lunar Pictures and Blake Northfield of Bronte Pictures.

== Cast ==
- Milly Alcock as Jien
- Will McDonald as Zac
- Nicholas Hope as Dr Peter Masuta
- Megan Drury as Dr Amy Wintercraig
- Texas Watterston as Zane
- Jack Ruwald as Timmy
- Alexia Santosuosso as Becky

== Synopsis ==
Ambitious surgeon, Dr. Amy Wintercraig (Megan Drury) has neglected her own family due to her career aspirations. Following an accident, her son slips into a coma, leading Amy to become consumed with grief and guilt. In an attempt to take her own life she awakens in an abandoned school underworld where she faces all manner of horrors in a quest to find her son and bring him back home.

== Filming locations ==
The School was filmed in 2017 at Gladesville Mental Hospital in Sydney, Australia.

== Production ==
The film was produced by Jim Robison at Lunar Pictures and Blake Northfield at Bronte Pictures and was sold to North American distributor Vertical Entertainment by film sales agent Cinema Management Group.
