= Hephzibah (film) =

1998 documentary film

- Directed by: Curtis Levy
- Written by: Curtis Levy
- Produced by: Curtis Levy
- Starring: Kerry Armstrong
- Cinematography: Erika Addis Ray Brislin; Jenni Meaney; Paul Ree Zoran Veljkovic
- Edited by: Veronika Jenet
- Release date: 1998
- Running time: 75 minutes
- Country: Australia
- Language: English

Hephzibah is a 1998 documentary film written, directed and produced by Curtis Levy. It looks at the life of concert pianist Hephzibah Menuhin.

== Reception ==
Writing in the Herald Sun Leigh Paatsch gave it 3 stars noting "The movie does lose some of its cohesive focus as it addresses her later years, if only because little cinematic evidence of this period could be found" Sheldon Kirshner of the Canadian Jewish News said that "Levy captures the essence of her personality in this affecting film." In the Canberra Times Simon Weaving concludes "Kerry Armstrong's readings are delicate and insightful, and the music testament to Hephzibah's brilliance, but the rest struggles to keep up."

== Awards ==
- 1999 Australian Film Institute Awards
  - Best Documentary - Curtis Levy - won
  - Best Achievement in Editing in a Non-Feature Film - Veronika Jenet - won
  - Best Direction in a Documentary - Curtis Levy - nominated
- International Documentary Film Festival Amsterdam
  - Silver Wolf Award - Curtis Levy - won
