= The Prime Minister Is Missing =

2008 Australian TV documentary film

The Prime Minister is Missing
- Directed by: Peter Butt
- Written by: Peter Butt
- Produced by: Peter Butt
- Starring: Normie Rowe; Nicholas Hope; Tony Llewellyn-Jones
- Cinematography: Calvin Gardiner
- Edited by: Peter Butt
- Music by: Guy Gross
- Release date: 2008
- Running time: 55 minutes
- Country: Australia
- Language: English

The Prime Minister is Missing is a 2008 Australian TV documentary film created by Peter Butt and broadcast on the ABC. Using re-enactments of surrounding events it looked at the Disappearance of Harold Holt.

== Cast ==
- Normie Rowe as Harold Holt
- Nicholas Hope as William McMahon
- Tony Llewellyn-Jones as John McEwen
- Helen Morse as Narrator (voice)
- Matthew O'Sullivan as Governor General Lord Casey
- Gloria Ajenstat as Mrs. Gillespie
- Lawrence Price as Alan Stewart
- Michael Howlett as Martin Simpson
- Chloe Gordon as Vyner Gillespie
- Bill Young as Detective Ford
- David Callan as Maxwell Newton
