= 1999 Australian Film Institute Awards =

Australian film and TV awards ceremony

41st Australian Film Institute Awards
- Date: 13 November 1999
- Site: Sydney, Australia

Highlights
- Best Film: Two Hands
- Most awards: Film: Two Hands (5); TV: The Day of the Roses (3)
- Most nominations: Film: Two Hands (11); TV: SeaChange (7)

Television coverage
- Network: SBS

The 41st Australian Film Institute Awards (generally known as the AFI Awards) were held on 13 November 1999. Presented by the Australian Film Institute (AFI), the awards celebrated the best in Australian feature film, documentary, short film and television productions of 1999. The nominations were announced on 13 October 1999. Two Hands received the most nominations in the feature film category with eleven, while SeaChange received seven nominations in the television category.

== Winners and nominees ==
Winners are listed first and highlighted in boldface.

=== Feature film ===
Best Film	Best Achievement in Direction
**Two Hands – Marian Macgowan**; Praise – Martha Coleman; Siam Sunset – Al Clark; Soft Fruit – Helen Bowden	**Gregor Jordan – Two Hands**; Bill Bennett – In a Savage Land; John Curran – Praise; Christina Andreef – Soft Fruit
Best Performance by an Actor in a Leading Role	Best Performance by an Actress in a Leading Role
**Russell Dykstra – Soft Fruit**; Hugh Jackman – Erskineville Kings; Richard Roxburgh – Passion; Heath Ledger – Two Hands	**Sacha Horler – Praise**; Maya Stange – In a Savage Land; Jeanie Drynan – Soft Fruit; Michela Noonan – Strange Fits of Passion
Best Performance by an Actor in a Supporting Role	Best Performance by an Actress in a Supporting Role
**Bryan Brown – Two Hands**; Andrew S. Gilbert – Paperback Hero; Roy Billing – Siam Sunset; Mitchell Butel – Strange Fits of Passion	**Sacha Horler – Soft Fruit**; Claudia Karvan – Passion; Emily Woof – Passion; Susie Porter – Two Hands
Best Original Screenplay	Best Screenplay Adapted from Another Source
**Gregor Jordan – Two Hands**; Max Dann, Andrew Knight – Siam Sunset; Christina Andreef – Soft Fruit; Elise McCredie – Strange Fits of Passion	**Andrew McGahan – Praise**
Best Achievement in Cinematography	Best Achievement in Editing
**Martin McGrath – Passion**; Danny Ruhlmann – In a Savage Land; Dion Beebe – Praise; Malcolm McCulloch – Two Hands	**Lee Smith – Two Hands**; Suresh Ayyar – Fresh Air; Alexandre de Franceshi – Praise; Nicholas Beauman – Siam Sunset
Best Achievement in Sound	Best Original Music Score
**Toivo Lember, Gethin Creagh, Peter Smith, Wayne Pashley – In a Savage Land**; Andrew Plain, Phil Judd, Guntis Sics, Annie Breslin, Jane Paterson – Passion; Brent Berge, Andrew Plain, Antony Gray, Gethin Creagh, Phil Tipene – Praise; Lee Smith, Ross Linton, Phil Heywood, Peter Townend, Tim Jordan, Nick Breslin – Two Hands	**David Bridie – In a Savage Land**; Dirty Three – Praise; Antony Partos – Soft Fruit; Cezary Skubiszewski – Two Hands
Best Achievement in Production Design	Best Achievement in Costume Design
**Murray Picknett – Passion**; Nicolas McCallum – In a Savage Land; Michael Philips – Praise; Steven Jones-Evans – Siam Sunset	**Terry Ryan – Passion**; Edie Kurzer – Fresh Air; Emily Seresin – Praise; Emily Seresin – Two Hands

=== Non-feature film ===
Best Documentary	Best Direction in a Documentary
**Hephzibah – Curtis Levy**; A Calcutta Christmas – Denise Haslem; Original Schtick – Peter George, Bronwyne Smith; Sadness – Michael McMahon, Megan McMurchy	**Maciej Wszelaki – Original Schtick**; Maree Delofski – A Calcutta Christmas; Curtis Levy – Hephzibah; Tony Ayres – Sadness
Best Short Fiction Film	Best Short Animation Film
**Above The Dust Level – Carla Drago**; Break & Enter – Amanda Brotchie; Liu Awaiting Spring – Andrew Soo; Wind – Ivan Sen	**Cousin – Adam Elliot**; HeadSpace – Chris Backhouse; Project Vlad – Aaron Rogers; Slim Pickings – Anthony Lucas
Best Screenplay in a Short Film	Best Achievement in Cinematography in a Non-Feature Film
**Trudy Hellier – Break & Enter**; Adam Elliot – Cousin; Richard Frankland – Harry's War; Sarah Rossetti – Pilbara Pearl	**David Parer – Island of The Vampire Birds**; Ross Emery – 117; Maciej Wszelaki – Original Schtick; Allan Collins – Wind
Best Achievement in Editing in a Non-Feature Film	Best Achievement in Sound in a Non-Feature Film
**Veronika Jenet – Hephzibah**; **Jane Usher – Original Schtick**; Nash Edgerton – Bloodlock; Adolfo Cruzado – Liu Awaiting Spring	**Pat Fiske, Livia Ruzic, Peter Walker – Sadness**; Luke Dunn Gielmuda – Project Vlad; Paul Finlay, Mark Tarpey, Peter Walker – The Astonishing Ashtons; Craig Butters, Kuji Jenkins, John Patterson, Tony Vaccher – Wind

=== Television ===
Best Episode in a Television Drama Series	Best Television Mini-Series or Telefeature
**Wildside – Series 2, Episode 19 (ABC) – Steve Knapman**; SeaChange – Series 2, Episode 13, "Law And Order" (ABC) – Sally Ayre-Smith; SeaChange – Series 2, Episode 8, "Manna From Heaven" (ABC) – Sally Ayre-Smith; SeaChange – Series 2, Episode 9, "Playing With Fire" (ABC) – Sally Ayre-Smith	**The Day of the Roses - (Network Ten) – Simone North, Tony Cavanaugh**; Aftershocks (SBS) – Julia Overton; Halifax f.p. – "Swimming With Sharks" (Nine Network) – Roger Le Mesurier, Roger Simpson, Robyn Sinclair; The Potato Factory (Seven Network) – Anthony Buckley, Des Monaghan
Best Episode in a Television Drama Series (Long)	Best Children's Television Drama
**All Saints – Series 2, Episode 17: "Head To Head" (Seven Network) – Jo Porter**; Home and Away – Episode 2646 (Seven Network) – Russell Webb; Neighbours – Episode 3388 (Network Ten) – Peter Dodds; Neighbours – Episode 3389 (Network Ten) – Peter Dodds	**See How They Run – Episode 1 (ABC) – Josephine Ward**; Crash Zone – Series 1, Episode 1, "The Dream Team" (Seven Network) – Patricia Edgar; Minty – Episode 11, "All The World's A Stage" (ABC) – Sue Taylor; The Adventures of Sam – Episode 11, "Not Quite Paradise" (ABC) – Noel Price
Best Performance by an Actor in a Leading Role in a Television Drama	Best Performance by an Actress in a Leading Role in a Television Drama
**Jeremy Sims – Aftershocks (SBS)**; David Tredinnick – Halifax f.p. – "Swimming With Sharks" (Nine Network); John Howard – SeaChange – Series 2, Episode 13, "Law And Order" (ABC); Samuel Johnson – Wildside – Series 2, Episode 19 (ABC)	**Jill Forster – SeaChange – Series 2, Episode 8, "Manna From Heaven" (ABC)**; Lisa McCune – The Potato Factory (Seven Network); Sonia Todd – The Potato Factory (Seven Network); Catherine McClements – Water Rats – Series 4, Episode 17, "Hi Honey I'm Home" (Nine Network)
Best Achievement in Direction in a Television Drama	Best Screenplay in a Television Drama
**Peter Fisk – The Day of the Roses (Network Ten)**; Esben Storm – Crash Zone, Series 1, Episode 1, "The Dream Team" (Seven Network); Graeme Harper – See How They Run – Episode 1 (ABC)	**John Misto – The Day of the Roses (Network Ten)**; Deborah Cox – SeaChange – Series 2, Episode 13, "Law And Order" (ABC); Andrew Knight, Deborah Cox – SeaChange – Series 2, Episode 8, "Manna From Heaven" (ABC); Kris Wyld – Wildside – Series 2, Episode 19 (ABC)

=== Additional awards ===
Raymond Longford Award	Byron Kennedy Award
**John Politzer**	**Baz Luhrmann**; **Catherine Martin**
Young Actors' Award	Best Foreign Film
**Abbie Cornish – Wildside – Series 2, Episode 19 (ABC)**	**Life Is Beautiful – Elda Ferri, Gianluigi Braschi**; Elizabeth – Alison Owen, Tim Bevan, Eric Fellner; The Thin Red Line – Robert Michael Giesler, John Roberdeau, Grant Hill; The Truman Show – Scott Rudin
Open Craft Award
**Francis Kelly (for original concept) – Bush Mechanics**; Michaela French (for concept and imagery) – Flux; Luigi Pittorino (for production design) – Sadness; Ian Brown (for design) – Trinidad
