= Milly Alcock =

Australian actress (born 2000)

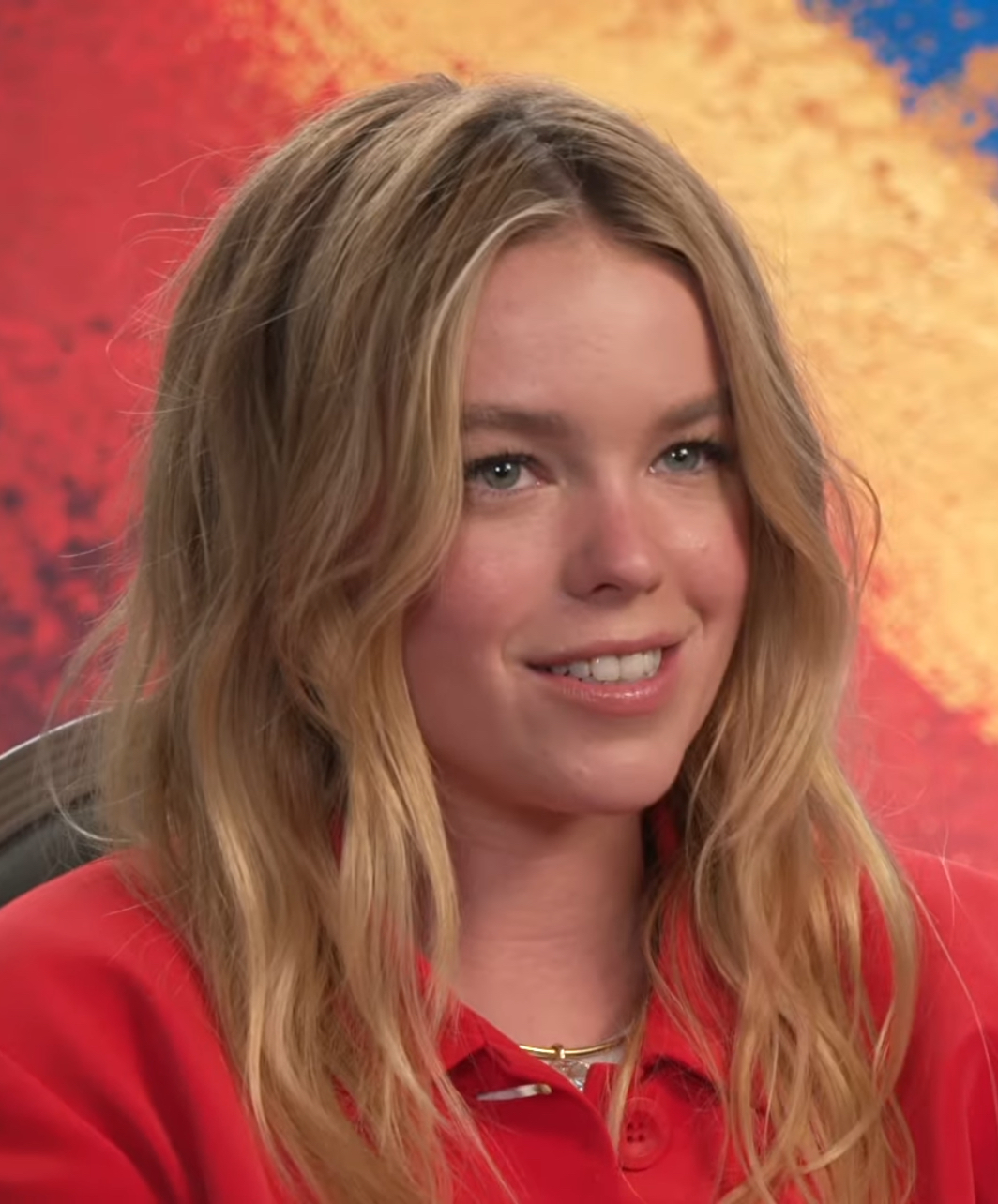
- Alcock in 2026
- Born: Amelia May Alcock; 11 April 2000 (age 26); Sydney, New South Wales, Australia
- Occupation: Actress
- Years active: 2013–present

Amelia May Alcock (born 11 April 2000), better known as Milly Alcock, is an Australian actress. She received an AACTA Award nomination for her performance in the Foxtel comedy-drama Upright (2019–2022). She gained wider recognition for starring as young Rhaenyra Targaryen in the HBO fantasy series House of the Dragon (2022–2024), for which she was nominated for a Critics' Choice Award.

Alcock portrays Kara Zor-El / Supergirl in the DC Universe, first making an uncredited appearance in Superman (2025). She reprised the role starring in Supergirl (2026).

== Early life ==
Amelia May Alcock was born on 11 April 2000 and raised in the Sydney suburb of Petersham. She has two younger brothers. Alcock was introduced to acting upon playing Little Red Riding Hood in Taverners Hill Infants School's version of Little Red Rocking Hood. She attended the local Stanmore Public School and then Newtown High School of the Performing Arts, from where she dropped out in 2018 when she was cast in Upright. She is the sister of rugby union player Albert Alcock.

== Career ==
Alcock made her television debut as a teenager in a 2014 episode of the Network Ten romantic comedy Wonderland. She appeared in commercials for NBN, Cadbury, KFC, and Woolworths. She starred on Disney Channel in Australia from 2015 to 2017, presenting on the short-form series B.F. Chefs and Hanging With. In 2017, Alcock landed her first named roles as Isabella Barrett in the web miniseries High Life alongside Odessa Young and Cindi Jackson in the third and final series of the ABC Television drama Janet King.

The following year, Alcock played Maya Nordenfelt in the Showcase drama Fighting Season. She also appeared in the sixth and final series of A Place to Call Home as Emma Carvolth, the Netflix series Pine Gap as Marissa Campbell, and the ABC series Les Norton as Sian Galese. In 2018, Alcock appeared in her first feature film The School.

In 2019, Alcock began starring in the Foxtel comedy-drama series Upright as runaway teenager Meg, hitchhiking across 3,200 kilometres (2,000 miles) of the Australian outback, a contributing factor to her being presented with a Casting Guild of Australia Rising Star Award 2018. For her performance, Alcock was nominated for Best Comedy Performer at the 10th AACTA Awards, making her one of the youngest nominees in the category. Alcock returned for Upright's second series in 2022. She also had supporting roles as Jenny McGinty and Sam Serrato in the series The Gloaming and Reckoning, respectively.

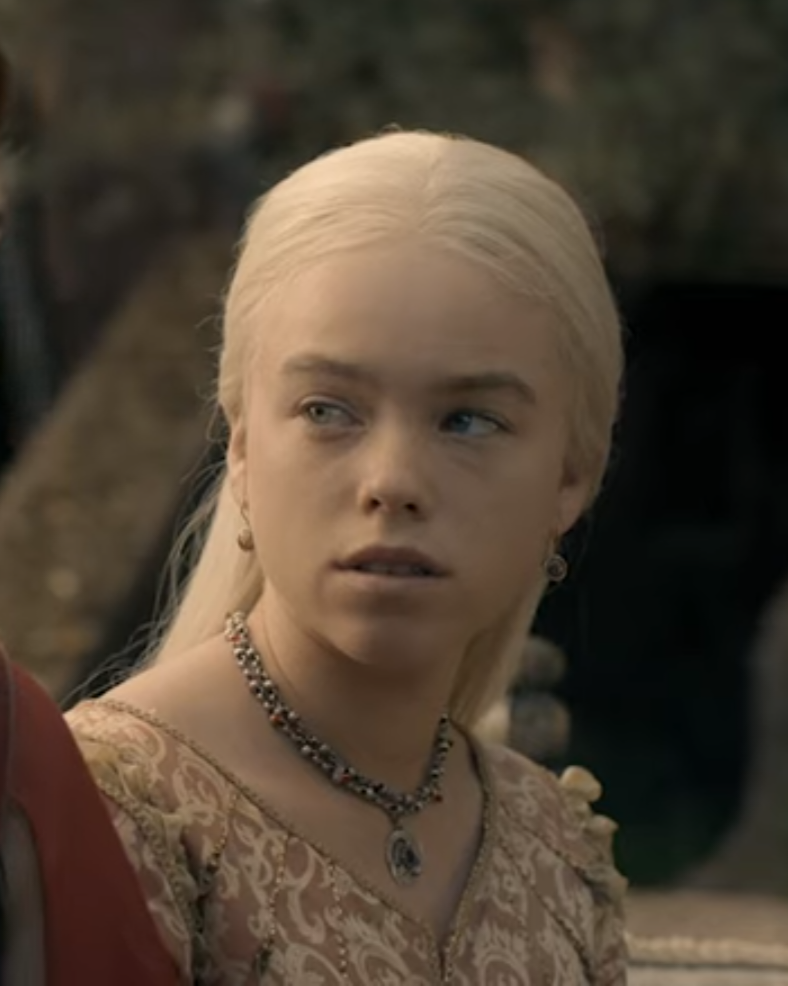
Alcock gained acclaim for her role as Princess Rhaenyra Targaryen in the HBO series House of the Dragon

In July 2021, it was announced Alcock had been cast as young Princess Rhaenyra Targaryen (later played by Emma D'Arcy) in the 2022 HBO fantasy series House of the Dragon, a Game of Thrones prequel and adaptation of George R. R. Martin's fictional history book Fire and Blood. Alcock garnered critical acclaim and was considered a highlight; Daniel van Boom for CNET wrote: "the shining star of House of the Dragon's opening episodes is surely Milly Alcock as Rhaenyra. She's got an enchantingly expressive face – a simple squinting of the eyes or a pursing of the lips can betray the range of emotions that accompany king's court politics." For the role, Alcock received a nomination for Critics' Choice Television Award for Best Supporting Actress in a Drama Series.

In January 2023, Alcock appeared in the music video for the song "Easy Now" by Noel Gallagher's High Flying Birds from the band's fourth album Council Skies. She made her West End stage debut in The Crucible at the Gielgud Theatre in June.

In 2025, she starred alongside Julianne Moore and Meghann Fahy in the Netflix dark comedy limited series Sirens.

In January 2024, it was announced that Alcock had been cast to play Kara Zor-El / Supergirl in the DC Universe film Supergirl, first making an uncredited appearance as the character in Superman (2025). Supergirl released on 26 June 2026, opening to mixed reviews and underperformed at the box-office; however, Alcock was praised for her performance. Alcock will reprise her role in the 2027 film Man of Tomorrow.

== Personal life ==
Prior to being cast in House of the Dragon, Alcock lived with her family in Sydney and took on side jobs. Harper's Bazaar Australia reported that she worked part time at a cafe in Sydney's Marrickville until filming began. In 2022, she relocated to London.

In 2026, Alcock revealed that she had been diagnosed with ADHD.

== Filmography ==
Key
†	Denotes films that have not yet been released

=== Film ===
Year	Title	Role	Notes
2018	The School	Jien	
2025	Superman	Kara Zor-El / Supergirl	Uncredited cameo
2026	Supergirl	Kara Zor-El / Supergirl	
2027	Man of Tomorrow †	Kara Zor-El / Supergirl	Post-production
TBA	Thumb †	TBA	Post-production
TBA	Untitled Takashi Miike film †	TBA	Filming

=== Television ===
Year	Title	Role	Notes
2014	Wonderland	Teen Girl 1	Episode: "Narcissism"
2015–2016	B.F. Chefs	Herself	Presenter
2017	Hanging With	Herself	Presenter
2017	Janet King	Cindi Jackson	Recurring role (series 3)
2018	A Place to Call Home	Emma Carvolth	Recurring role (series 6)
2018	Fighting Season	Maya Nordenfelt	Recurring role
2018	Pine Gap	Marissa Campbell	Limited-run series, main cast
2019	Les Norton	Sian Galese	Recurring role
2019–2022	Upright	Meg Adams	Main cast
2020	The Gloaming	Jenny McGinty	Recurring role
2020	Reckoning	Sam Serrato	Recurring role
2022–2024	House of the Dragon	Young Princess Rhaenyra Targaryen	Main cast (season 1); Guest cast (season 2); 7 episodes
2025	Sirens	Simone DeWitt	Miniseries, main cast

=== Web ===
Year	Title	Role	Notes
2017	High Life	Isabella Barrett	Miniseries; 6 episodes
2026	Royal Court	Guest	Episode: "Milly Alcock Joins Brittany Broski's Royal Court"

=== Music videos ===
Year	Track	Artist	Role
2023	Easy Now	Noel Gallagher's High Flying Birds	Main Girl

=== Theatre ===
Year	Title	Role	Venue(s)
2023	The Crucible	Abigail Williams	Gielgud Theatre, West End, London
2027	Miss Julie	Miss Julie	The Old Vic

== Awards and nominations ==
Year	Association	Category	Work	Result	Ref.
2018	Casting Guild of Australia	Rising Stars of 2018	Television career	Won	
2020	AACTA Awards	Best Comedy Performer	Upright	Nominated	
2022	IGN Summer Movie Awards	Best Performance in a TV Series	House of the Dragon	Nominated	
2023	Critics' Choice Television Awards	Best Supporting Actress in a Drama Series	House of the Dragon	Nominated	
2023	Critics' Choice Super Awards	Best Actress in a Science Fiction/Fantasy Series	House of the Dragon	Nominated	
2023	Logie Awards	Most Outstanding Actress	Upright	Nominated	
2024	Saturn Awards	Best Performance by a Younger Actor on a TV Series	House of the Dragon	Nominated	
2026	Critics' Choice Super Awards	Best Actress in a Superhero Movie	Supergirl	Won	
