= Elizabeth Drake =

Australian composer

- Origin: Australia
- Genre: Film scores
- Occupation: Composer

Elizabeth Drake is an Australian composer. Her film soundtrack credits include Road to Nhill and Japanese Story

== Discography ==
=== Albums ===
List of albums, with selected details
Title	Details
Road to Nhill	Released: 1997; Format: CD; Label: Gecko Films (GF 101CD)
Japanese Story	Released: 2003; Format: CD; Label: Move (MD 3279)

Drake did the composing of the instance of the song "Chinsagu no Hana" used in Japanese Story.

== Awards and nominations ==
=== AACTA Awards ===
- Nominated. 1997 AACTA Award for Best Original Music Score for Road to Nhill
- Winner. 2003 AACTA Award for Best Original Music Score for Japanese Story

=== ARIA Award ===
- Nominated. 2004 ARIA Award for Best Original Soundtrack, Cast or Show Album for Japanese Story

=== Film Critics Circle of Australia Awards ===
- Nominated. 1998 Best Music Score for Road to Nhill
- Winner. 2003 Best Music Score for Japanese Story

=== IF Awards ===
- Nominated. 2004 Best Music for Japanese Story

=== Screen Music Awards ===
- Winner. 2004 Best Feature Film Score for Japanese Story
