= Song of Okinawa Prefecture =

Japanese prefectural song

Okinawa Kenmin no Uta
English: Song of Okinawa Prefecture
- 沖縄県民の歌
- Prefectural song of Okinawa Prefecture
- Lyrics: Seiko Miyazato
- Music: Shigeru Shiroma
- Adopted: May 15, 1972

Audio sample
- First 15 seconds: file; help

The "Song of Okinawa Prefecture" (Japanese: 沖縄県民の歌, Hepburn: Okinawa Kenmin no Uta) was adopted on May 15, 1972, upon the United States' return of Okinawa Prefecture to Japan. Its lyrics were written by local high school teacher Seiko Miyazato, with music composed by University of the Ryukyus professor Shigeru Shiroma.

== History ==
The U.S. militarily occupied the Ryukyu Islands after defeating Japan in the Pacific War of World War II. After diplomatic meetings in 1969, the U.S. agreed to return Okinawa Prefecture to Japan within three years. In preparation, the Japanese government held a public contest to compose an official prefectural song – the country's first – to "cultivate the Okinawan people's pride and love".

Music composed by Shigeru Shiroma, a professor of education at the University of the Ryukyus, was chosen to accompany lyrics by Seiko Miyazato, a teacher at Nakazato Junior High School in Kumejima, on Kume Island. The governor of Okinawa Prefecture announced the song's adoption through a public notice (#4) on May 15, 1972, the day the prefecture was returned to Japan. The song's instrumental is performed at the prefectural government's annual ceremony marking Okinawa Prefecture's return to Japan.

On March 18, 2012, following a public survey, the Okinawa Prefectural government designated "Tinsagu nu Hana" as "Okinawa Prefecture's favorite song". It subsequently became an official symbol of Okinawa Prefecture, making it the prefecture's second musical symbol alongside the "Song of Okinawa Prefecture".
