= List of Japanese prefectural songs =

This is a list of Japanese prefectural songs. Forty-four of the forty-seven prefectures of Japan have one or more official prefectural songs.

The only prefectures that do not have a prefectural song are Osaka, Hiroshima and Ōita. However, all except Ōita have unofficial prefectural songs. It is sometimes believed that Hyōgo does not have an official prefectural song, but the song "Hyōgo Kenminka" was adopted in 1947.

== Prefectural songs ==
Prefecture	Prefectural song	Year adopted	Notes and references
Aichi	"Warera ga Aichi" (われらが愛知; lit. Our Aichi)	1950	Lyric and music
Akita	Prefectural historical song: "Akita Kenminka" (秋田県民歌; lit. Prefecture people's song of Akita)	1930	Lyric and music
Akita	Prefectural people's song: "Kenmin no uta" (県民の歌; lit. Song of the Prefecture people)	1959	Lyric and music
Aomori	Prefecture hymn: "Aomori-ken sanka" (青森県賛歌; lit. The hymn of Aomori Prefecture)	1971	This hymn is not being played now, it has been abolished substantially. Lyric and music
Aomori	Prefectural people's song: "Aoi mori no Message" (青い森のメッセージ; lit. Message from the blue-green forest)	2001	Lyric and music
Chiba	"Chiba kenminka" (千葉県民歌; lit. Prefecture people's song of Chiba)	1963	Lyric and music
Ehime	"Ehime no uta" (愛媛の歌; lit. The Song of Ehime)	1973	This song is the third anthem. Lyric and music
Fukui	"Fukui kenminka" (福井県民歌; lit. Prefecture people's song of Fukui)	2014	Some of the lyrics were removed and the music changed from a song made in 1954. Lyric and music
Fukuoka	"Kibō no Hikari" (希望の光; lit. The Ray of Hope)	1970	Lyric (with "Fukuoka ondo")
Fukushima	"Fukushima-ken kenmin no uta" (福島県県民の歌; lit. Prefecture people's song of Fukushima Prefecture)	1967	Lyric
Gifu	"Gifu kenmin no uta" (岐阜県民の歌; lit. Prefecture people's song of Gifu)	1954	Lyric, music and video
Gunma	"Gunma-ken no uta" (群馬県の歌; lit. The Song of Gunma Prefecture)	1968	This song is the third anthem. Lyric and music
Hiroshima	None.	-	
Hiroshima	Prefecture sports anthem: "Niji no Kagayaki" (虹の輝き; lit. Shining of the Rainbow)	1994	
Hokkaido	Prefecture march: "Hikari afurete" (光あふれて; lit. Full of light)	1966	All three songs have been established as a "Hokkaido Prefectural people's song".
Hokkaido	Home song: "Mukashi no mukashi" (むかしのむかし; lit. Once upon a time)	1966	All three songs have been established as a "Hokkaido Prefectural people's song".
Hokkaido	Dōmin ondo: "Hokkai bayashi" (北海ばやし; lit. Hokkai accompaniment)	1966	All three songs have been established as a "Hokkaido Prefectural people's song".
Hyōgo	Prefecture official song: "Hyōgo Kenminka" (兵庫県民歌; lit. Prefecture people's song of Hyōgo)	1947	Hyōgo Prefectural government has expressed the view "Prefectural song does not exist" and denied the fact that currently, this song has been enacted in 1947.
Hyōgo	Unofficial prefectural song: "Furusato Hyōgo" (ふるさと兵庫; lit. Our Homeland, Hyōgo)	1980	Lyric
Ibaraki	"Ibaraki kenmin no uta" (茨城県民の歌; lit. Ibaraki Prefecture people's song)	1963	Lyric and music
Ishikawa	"Ishikawa kenmin no uta" (石川県民の歌; lit. Ishikawa Prefecture people's song)	1959	Lyric and music
Iwate	"Iwate kenmin no uta" (岩手県民の歌; lit. Iwate Prefecture people's song)	1965	Lyric
Kagawa	"Kagawa kenminka" (香川県民歌; lit. Prefecture people's song of Kagawa)	1954	Music video
Kagoshima	"Kagoshima kenmin no uta" (鹿児島県民の歌; lit. Kagoshima Prefecture people's song)	1948	Lyric
Kanagawa	prefectural song: "Hikari arata ni" (光あらたに; lit. The new light)	1950	This song is the second anthem. Introduction
Kanagawa	Chorus song of the twenty-first century: "Furusato no kaze ni naritai" (ふるさとの風になりたい; lit. I want to be the wind of my native place)	2001	
Kōchi	"Kōchi kenmin no uta" (高知県民の歌; lit. Kōchi Prefecture people's song)	1959	Lyric and music
Kumamoto	"Kumamoto kenmin no uta" (熊本県民の歌; lit. Kumamoto Prefecture people's song)	1959	This song is not enacted by prefecture. Enacted by Executive Committee of 1959 National Sports Festival.
Kyoto	"Kyoto-fu no uta" (京都府の歌; lit. The song of Kyoto)	1984	Lyric
Mie	"Mie kenminka" (三重県民歌; lit. Prefecture people's song of Mie)	1964	Lyric and music
Miyagi	Prefectural historical song: "Miyagi Kenminka" (宮城県民歌; lit. Prefecture people's song of Miyagi)	1938	Lyrics
Miyagi	Prefecture official song: "Kagayaku Kyōdo" (輝く郷土; lit. Shining home province)	1946	Lyrics
Miyazaki	"Miyazaki kenminka" (宮崎県民歌; lit. Prefecture people's song of Miyazaki)	1964	This song is the second anthem. Lyric and music
Nagano	"Shinano no Kuni" (信濃の国; lit. The Province of Shinano)	1968	Introduction
Nagasaki	"Minami no kaze" (南の風; lit. Southern Wind)	1961	Lyric, music and video
Nara	"Nara kenmin no uta" (奈良県民の歌; lit. Nara Prefecture people's song)	1968	Lyric and music (with "Nara kenmin ondo")
Niigata	"Niigata kenminka" (新潟県民歌; lit. Prefecture people's song of Niigata)	1948	Lyric and music
Ōita	None.	-	
Ōita	Unofficial Prefecture march: "Ōita-ken kōshinkyoku" (大分県行進曲; lit. Ōita Prefecture march)	1935	This song has been posted on the pocket notebook of prefectural government issued until 2004.
Ōita	Prefecture sports song: "Ōita-kenmin taiiku no uta" (大分県民体育の歌; lit. Ōita Prefecture people's sports song)	1950	
Okayama	Prefecture official song: "Okayama-ken no uta" (岡山県の歌; lit. The song of Okayama Prefecture)	1957	
Okayama	Prefectural people's favorite song: "Minna no kokoro ni" (みんなのこころに; lit. In the minds of everyone)	1982	Lyric and audio
Okinawa	"Okinawa kenmin no uta" (沖縄県民の歌; lit. Okinawa Prefecture people's song)	1972	Lyric and music
Osaka	None.	-	
Osaka	Urban prefecture sports hymn: "Namihaya no uta" (なみはやのうた; lit. The song of Namihaya)	1997	This song was made for 1997 National Sports Festival Hymn.
Saga	Prefecture official song: "Saga kenmin no uta" (佐賀県民の歌; lit. Saga Prefecture people's song)	1974	This song is the second anthem. Lyric
Saga	Quasi-prefectural song: "Kaze wa mirai iro" (風はみらい色; lit. The wind is the color of the future)	1993	Lyric
Saga	Saga country song: "Sakae no kuni kara" (栄の国から; lit. From Sakae country)	2000	Lyric
Saitama	"Saitama kenka" (埼玉県歌; lit. The anthem of Saitama Prefecture)	1965	Lyric and music
Shiga	"Shiga kenmin no uta" (滋賀県民の歌; lit. Shiga Prefecture people's song)	1954	Lyric and music
Shimane	"Usu-murasaki no yamanami" (薄紫の山脈; lit. The mountains of thin purple)	1951	Lyric and music
Shizuoka	Prefecture official song: "Shizuoka kenka" (静岡県歌; lit. The anthem of Shizuoka Prefecture)	1968	Lyrics
Shizuoka	Shizuoka hymn: "Fuji yo yume yo tomo yo" (富士よ夢よ友よ; lit. Hail Fuji, hail dream, hail my friend)	1990	Lyrics
Tochigi	"kenmin no uta" (県民の歌; lit. Prefecture people's song)	1952	Lyric and music
Tokushima	"Tokushima kenmin no uta" (徳島県民の歌; lit. Tokushima Prefecture people's song)	1971	This song is the second anthem. Lyric and music
Tokyo	Metropolis anthem: "Tokyo-toka" (東京都歌; lit. The anthem of Tokyo Metropolis)	1947	Lyric
Tokyo	Metropolitan historical song: "Tokyo-shika" (東京市歌; lit. The anthem of Tokyo city)	1926	Lyric
Tottori	"Wakiagaru chikara" (わきあがる力; lit. The gushing power)	1958	Lyric
Toyama	Prefecture official song: "Toyama kenmin no uta" (富山県民の歌; lit. Toyama Prefecture people's song)	1958	Lyric and music
Toyama	Prefectural people's favorite song: "Furusato no sora" (ふるさとの空; lit. The sky of the native place)	2012	Introduction
Wakayama	"Wakayama kenminka" (和歌山県民歌; lit. Prefecture people's song of Wakayama)	1948	Lyric and music
Yamagata	Prefecture official song: "Mogami gawa" (最上川; lit. Mogami river)	1981	This song's author of Hirohito (Emperor Shōwa). Lyric
Yamagata	Prefectural people's sports song: "Sports kenminka" (スポーツ県民歌; lit. Prefecture people's sports song)	1948	Lyric and music
Yamaguchi	Prefecture official song: "Yamaguchi kenmin no uta" (山口県民の歌; lit. Yamaguchi Prefecture people's song)	1962	This song is the second anthem. Lyric and music
Yamaguchi	Prefectural people's favorite song: "Minna no furusato" (みんなのふるさと; lit. The native place of everyone)	1979	Lyric and music
Yamanashi	Prefecture official song: "Yamanashi-ken no uta" (山梨県の歌; lit. The song of Yamanashi Prefecture)	1950	Lyric and music
Yamanashi	Prefectural people's favorite song: "Midori no furusato" (緑のふるさと; lit. Green native place)	1977	Lyric and music

=== Former prefectural song ===
Prefecture	prefectural song	Year adopted	Notes and references
Karafuto	"Karafuto tōka" (樺太島歌; lit. The song of Karafuto island)	1938	Now under the administration of Russia as part of Sakhalin Oblast

== See also ==
- List of regional anthems
