= Painting with Light in a Dark World =

2002 documentary film

- Directed by: Sascha Ettinger-Epstein
- Written by: Sascha Ettinger-Epstein
- Produced by: Renata Schuman
- Starring: Peter Darren Moyle; Robert McFarlane
- Cinematography: Mark Bliss; Justin Malinowski
- Edited by: Rolland Gallois; Andrew Aristides
- Release date: 2002
- Running time: 26 minutes
- Country: Australia
- Language: English

Painting with Light in a Dark World is a 2002 Australian documentary film created by Sascha Ettinger-Epstein. She follows photographer Peter Darren Moyle as he takes pictures of the "darker side of Sydney's streets" It was Ettinger-Epstein debut film and stemmed from a chance meeting at the Matthew Talbot refuge in Woolloomooloo after which she saw his photographs.

== Reception ==
Brian Courtis of the Sun Herald gave it 3 1/2 stars in his capsule review. He wrote Moyle, the remarkable subject of film-maker Sasha Ettinger-Epstein's intimate documentary Painting With Light In A Dark World, has lived the life and, through his camera, collected a unique record of its people."

== Awards ==
- 2003 Australian Film Institute Awards
  - Best Direction in a Documentary - Sascha Ettinger-Epstein - won
  - Best Editing in a Non-Feature Film - Rolland Gallois and Andrew Aristides - won
  - Best Documentary - Sascha Ettinger-Epstein - nominated
