= The Life of Harry Dare =

- Directed by: Aleksi Vellis
- Written by: Gerald Thompson
- Produced by: Terry J. Charitsis
- Starring: John Moore; Nicholas Hope
- Cinematography: Geoffrey Hall
- Music by: David Hirschfelder
- Production companies: Infinity Pictures; South Australian Film Corporation
- Release date: 1995
- Running time: 90 min
- Country: Australia
- Language: English

The Life of Harry Dare is a 1995 Australian film about an Aboriginal detective. Directed by Aleksi Vellis it stars John Moore as the titular Harry Dare, who is searching for his missing Kombi van.

== Cast ==
- John Moore as Harry Dare
- Nicholas Hope as Kevin
- Tom E. Lewis as Harry's Father
- Ullie Birvé as Gina
- Don Barker as Sergeant
- Aaron Wilton as Jim
- Tony Briggs as Dan
- Justin Braine as Max

== Production ==
The Life of Harry Dare was filmed in Adelaide, South Australia. It was first screened in 1995 in the leadup to that years AFI Awards but at the time did not have a set commercial release. In July 1997 it was released into a single theatre before getting a further run in Sydney.

== Reception ==
In the leadup to the 1995 AFI Awards, The Age’s Jim Schembri called it "an exceptionally funny film about an Aboriginal man's obsession with a Kombi van." After its 1997 release, he gave it 3 stars saying "By skillfully fusing several race-related elements into a light comedy without making light of them, Harry Dare shows that being entertaining does not necessarily mean being vacuous."Robert Drewe of The Sydney Morning Herald says it is "pretty hard to classify. At times it seems like a tough urban drama, at others more a bitter-sweet comedy." David Stratton commenting on The Movie Show gave it 3 stars and says the film "doesn't in the end make the most of some intriguing ideas, but nevertheless it's engaging entertainment." Adrian Martin from The Age gave it 2 stars finishing "Neither a full-blooded social satire nor a cute Aussie version of Ghost Dad (1990), The Life of Harry Dare dwells in that frustrating middle-ground where so many Australian films go to die."

== Awards ==
- 1995 Australian Film Institute Awards
  - Best Actor in a Leading Role - John Moore - nominated
