= Random and Whacky =

- Genre: Children's television
- Created by: Monica O'Brien; Keaton Stewart
- Starring: Ben Bennett; Eliza Gossslet; Matilda Gosslet; Thuso Lekwape; Eliza Nicholls; Nicholas Hope
- Voices of: Nicholas Hope; John Unwin
- Country of origin: Australia
- Original language: English
- No. of seasons: 2
- No. of episodes: 75

Production
- Executive producer: Monica O'Brien
- Producer: Keaton Stewart
- Production location: Australia
- Running time: 24 minutes

Original release
- Network: 10 Peach
- Release: 4 June 2017 – 23 May 2020

Random and Whacky is an Australian comedy television program for children and teenagers. It first screened on 10 Peach (previously Eleven) on 4 June 2017.

The series is set in a top-secret agency, where super agents Cameron, Sunshine, Wil, Kayla and Shayla provide solutions to problems faced by children. They team is focused on brainstorming, thinking things through from different perspectives and working with often providing unconventional solutions to conventional problems.

Production for the second series began in 2018 and screened in 2019.

== Cast ==
- Ben Bennett as Wil
- Eliza Goslett as Kayla
- Matilda Goslett as Shayla
- Thuso Lekwape as Cameron
- Eliza Nicholls as Sunshine
- Nicholas Hope as Nigel

== Series overview ==
Series	Episodes	Originally released	
Series	Episodes	First released	Last released
1	15	4 June 2017	10 September 2017
2	60	6 April 2019	23 May 2020
