= Cold Turkey (short film) =

- Directed by: Steven McGregor
- Written by: Steven McGregor
- Produced by: Priscilla Collins
- Starring: Wayne Munro; John Moore
- Cinematography: Allan Collins
- Edited by: Deb Johnson
- Music by: David Bridie
- Release date: March 3, 2003
- Running time: 45 minutes
- Country: Australia
- Language: English

Cold Turkey is a 2003 Australian TV film written and directed by Steven McGregor. It was filmed in Alice Springs (Mparntwe) in August 2002, cost around $800,000 and was produced by CAAMA Productions. It premiered at the 2003 Adelaide International Film Festival.

== Premise ==
Brothers Robby and Shane go out for the night before Robby leaves town for a new job. They wake up the next morning in a prison cell and Robby tries to remember what has happened.

== Cast ==
- Wayne Munro as Robby
- John Moore as Shane
- Kelton Pell as Old Man

== Reception ==
Variety's Russell Edwards writes "Fest sidebars specializing in ethnic fare will likely be the only cafeterias serving this brief, engaging but ultimately muddled film." Kieran Finnane in the Alice Springs News wrote that it "revealed itself to be a remarkably honest film, telling a dispiriting story of two brothers and the destructive love between them." Nicole Brady of the Age writes "It is not easy watching and a sense of menace gradually builds as we are slowly let into the circumstances of their sodden adventure. Notions of brotherhood pervade the piece, and while we may not agree with the men's interpretation of it, this troubling film will leave you thinking." Jacqui Taffel of the Sydney Morning Herald said "The script mostly captures convincingly the patterns of their familiar banter, veering from casual ribbing to simmering resentment. Such a tale is never going to be uplifting, but it's engaging, well-acted particularly the two leads and an inescapably Australian story."

== Awards ==
- 2003 Australian Film Institute Awards
  - Best Screenplay in a Short Film - Steven McGregor - nominated
  - Open Craft AFI Award – Non Feature Film - John Moore (for Acting) - nominated
