= Original Schtick =

1999 documentary film

- DVD cover
- Directed by: Maciek Wszelaki
- Written by: Peter George; Maciek Wszelaki
- Produced by: Peter George; Bronwyne Smith
- Starring: Bob Fischer
- Cinematography: Maciek Wszelaki
- Edited by: Jane Usher
- Release date: 1999
- Running time: 52 minutes
- Country: Australia
- Language: English

Original Schtick is a 1999 documentary film directed by Maciek Wszelaki. It exposes Bob Fischer, an American artist. It debuted at the Melbourne International Film Festival in July 1999 where Fischer was in attendance, turning the post-film question-and-answer session into a spectacle.

== Reception ==
Writing in the Age Adrian Martin gave it 3 stars stating "Ultimately, Original Schtick is less an investigative documentary than a queasily compelling soap opera. It sticks relentlessly to a video-vérité style poised just a couple of inches from its subjects' mugs, and is strung together in a simple, linear, storytelling style familiar from Rats in the Ranks." Margaret Pomeranz commenting on The Movie Show said "it`s jaw-droppingly revealing and very clever...Really well shot and directed by Maciej Wszelaki and edited by Jane Usher the documentary is beautifully ironic" Jim Schembri's 3 star capsual review in the Age finished "Very Spinal Tap in flavor, very funny." In the Australian Shane Danielson says "As a study in cultural cringe and personal idiocy, it's priceless. But as an illustration of the bankruptcy of at least some contemporary art, it's invaluable."

== Awards ==
- 1999 Australian Film Institute Awards
  - Best Direction in a Documentary - Maciek Wszelaki - won
  - Best Achievement in Editing in a Non-Feature Film - Jane Usher - won
  - Best Documentary - Peter George, Bronwyne Smith - nominated
  - Best Achievement in Cinematography in a Non-Feature Film - Maciek Wszelaki - nominated
