= Felicity Cockram =

Australian film producer

Felicity Cockram is an Australian film producer. From 2002 to 2005 she was the general manager of the Australian Film Institute.

== Life ==
In the 1980s, Cockram produced films in Australia, including educational videos for school resources.

From 1996 to 2002, Cockram worked in Los Angeles for the American Film Institute, the Academy of TV Arts and Sciences and The Montecito Picture Company in Los Angeles. In 2002, Cockram was appointed general manager of the Australian Film Institute, a position she held until her resignation in February 2005.

== Filmography ==
Title	Year	Notes
Caring for Our Country	1987	
What Did You Do in the War, Mummy?: Images of Australian Women in Wartime	1989	
The Prom	1992	
