= Praise (film) =

- Directed by: John Curran
- Written by: Andrew McGahan
- Based on: Praise by Andrew McGahan
- Produced by: Martha Coleman; Helen Watts
- Starring: Peter Fenton; Sacha Horler
- Cinematography: Dion Beebe
- Edited by: Alexandre de Franceschi
- Music by: Warren Ellis; Antony Partos; Michael Turner
- Production company: Emcee Films
- Distributed by: Strand Releasing
- Release dates: 11 September 1998 (Toronto International Film Festival); 22 April 1999 (Australia)
- Running time: 98 minutes
- Country: Australia
- Language: English
- Box office: A$578,927

Praise is a 1998 Australian drama film directed by John Curran and adapted by Andrew McGahan from his novel of the same name. The film stars Peter Fenton and Sacha Horler and is about two outcasts who fall into an unlikely relationship.

== Plot ==
Gordon, a 25-year-old chain-smoking asthmatic who unhappily works at a Brisbane bottle shop, moves into a run-down residential hotel. He becomes embroiled in a romance with Cynthia, a former co-worker who suffers from eczema and low self-esteem. Gordon and Cynthia occupy themselves with drink, drugs, sex, and Scrabble. A love triangle arises when Gordon's former love, Rachel, comes back into his life.

== Cast ==
- Peter Fenton as Gordon
- Sacha Horler as Cynthia
- Marta Dusseldorp as Rachel
- Loene Carmen as Cathy
- Joel Edgerton as Leo
- Jason Clarke as Frank
- Yvette Duncan as Molly
- Tex Perkins as Raymond (as Gregory Perkins)
- Skye Wansey as Helen
- Richard Green as Dave
- Lynette Curran as sexual health worker
- Susan Prior as Sophie
- Paul Lum as Darren
- Fiona Mahl as Darren's girlfriend
- Damon Herriman as Skinhead
- Ken Shorter as Male Nurse

== Release ==
The film premiered at the 1998 Toronto International Film Festival. It was also screened as part of the Panorama section at the 49th Berlin International Film Festival.

== Critical reception ==
Elvis Mitchell of The New York Times wrote Praise "is uncanny and sizzling because it has the apparently aimless feel of a bad love affair of youth, the kind of story you would overhear the thoughtless Gordon telling somebody; you would move your chair closer to catch every seamy, and often hilarious, detail." He also praised Horler's performance and concluded, "Pungent, poignant and full of honest sentiment, Praise has a complicated emotional intelligence that is hard to come by in movies these days."

TV Guide reviewed the filmed positively and said, "McGahan's novel was compared to Bret Easton Ellis's Less Than Zero in its depiction of anomic slackers numbing themselves with drugs and impersonal sex. But Charles Bukowski's pickled oeuvre is the better comparison; McGahan and filmmaker John Curran lack Ellis's delusions of glamour and their tour of the low life is sordid without being exploitative, coolly compassionate without in any way glossing over Gordon and Cynthia's crippling personal deficiencies. Their doomed fling is oddly hypnotic and ultimately haunting." Mick LaSalle of the San Francisco Chronicle wrote, "Praise is fun and strange, yet remarkably warm in its look at characters who let their hearts out of the bag as unwitting acts of salvation and, at the same time, self-destruction. If you want an offbeat portrait of romance, this is the movie."

On review aggregate website Rotten Tomatoes, Praise has an approval rating of 88% based on 8 reviews. On Metacritic, the film has a score of 79 based on 12 reviews, indicating "generally favorable reviews".

== Awards and nominations ==
Australian Cinematographers Society Awards

- Feature Productions Cinema - Dion Beebe (won)

Australian Film Institute Awards

- Best Screenplay Adapted From Another Source - Andrew McGahan (won)
- Best Performance for Best Actress in a Leading Role - Sacha Horler (won)

ARIA Music Awards

- Best Original Soundtrack (nominee)

British Independent Film Awards

- Best Foreign Independent Film - English Language (nominee)

Film Critics Circle of Australia Awards

- Best Female Actor - Sacha Horler (won)
- Best Director - John Curran (won)
- Best Adapted Screenplay - Andrew McGahan (won)

Gijón International Film Festival

- Best Screenplay - Andrew McGahan (won)
- Best Feature - John Curran (nominee)

Toronto International Film Festival

- International Critics' Award (FIPRESCI) - John Curran (won)

== See also ==
- Cinema of Australia
