= Kieran Finnane =

Australian journalist and writer

Kieran Finnane is a journalist and writer based in Alice Springs in the Northern Territory. She is one of the founding journalists of Alice Springs News and has written non-fiction books.

== Early life and education ==
Finnane studied arts and film studies at the University of Sydney and the University of Paris (Panthéon-Sorbonne). Following the completion of her studies she worked in television before moving to Alice Springs in 1987.

== Career ==
In 1994 Finnane and husband Erwin Chlanda founded the Alice Springs News, and it soon became the largest circulation independent newspaper in the Northern Territory. In 1997 the newspaper shifted from printed to online publication and became the Alice Springs News Online.

Finnane has been a regular contributor to other publications around Australia, including Art Monthly Australasia, Artlink, Griffith Review, Inside Story, and The Saturday Paper.

== Books ==
In 2016 Finnane published her first book Trouble: on Trial in Central Australia. This book examines the complexities of life in Alice Springs, particularly the Alice Springs Town Camps, and what is revealed in the criminal court. The book attempts to dispassionately present the horrors of crimes committed in Central Australia, and is particularly focused on the violence of Aboriginal men under the influence of alcohol, towards their wives, brothers and cousins and others. It was well-reviewed by journalist Barry Hill, who wrote: "Trouble is reporting in the liberal, Western mode at its best. It seeks to be compassionate, full of right love, you might say, but the love is conducted without falling into sentimentality, on the one hand, or in defensive historical polemic, on the other".

Finnane's second book, Peace Crimes: Pine Gap, national security and dissent was published in August 2020. It looks at the closely-guarded and secretive military facility called Pine Gap, close to Alice Springs, with a particular focus on the arrest of the Peace Pilgrims, non-violent activists. This book won the 2022 Chief Minister's NT Book Award for non-fiction; it was described by the judges as being "quietly shocking … a must read for anyone who is concerned about foreign interests and governments with hidden agendas".

== Poetry and short stories ==
Finnane published numerous poems in Living room: poetry from the Centre in 2003 and The milk in the sky : writing from the Centre in 2006.

These include:

- The burnt house, short story, appears in The milk in the sky (2006)
- Last fight, poetry, appears in The milk in the sky (2006)
- Ilparpa, "because", poetry, appears in Living room (2003)
- Third summer, "the buoyancy suit holds", poetry, appears in Living room (2003)
- Two men on a bridge, "outside the old port town, poetry, appears in Living room (2003)
- Reading the possibilities, "sleepless, he walked", poetry, appears in Living room (2003)

== Recognition ==
Finnane won Watch This Space's annual Lofty Award (Note: "The Pam Lofts Award for High Endeavour in Central Australian Contemporary Art", named in honour of Pam Lofts) in 2013 for her contribution to arts writing and criticism in Central Australia.

In October 2020 Finanne talked about her life in a Desert Tracks interview with ABC Alice Springs journalist Emma Haskin, where she talks about her life in the Red Centre and meeting her husband Erwin Chlanda.
