= Road to Nhill =

- Directed by: Sue Brooks
- Written by: Alison Tilson
- Produced by: Sue Maslin
- Starring: Tony Barry; Vikki Blanche; Paul Chubb; Bill Young; Patricia Kennedy
- Release date: 13 November 1997
- Running time: 95 minutes
- Country: Australia
- Language: English
- Box office: $884,949

Road to Nhill is a 1997 Australian comedy-drama film directed by Sue Brooks. The film won the "Golden Alexander" (first prize) for Best Feature-Length Film at The International Thessaloniki Film Festival.

Produced by Sue Maslin, it was shot on location in Pyramid Hill, Victoria.

== Plot ==
A car carrying four lady lawn bowlers on its way to Nhill is involved in an accident on a deserted road in rural Victoria. Locals, not knowing where the accident was, or who was involved, embark on a journey to assist.

== Cast ==
- Tony Barry as Jim
- Vikki Blanche as Jill Whitton
- Paul Chubb as Maurie
- Bill Young as Brian
- Patricia Kennedy as Jean
- Lynette Curran as Margot
- Alwyn Kurts as Jack
- Pepe Trevor as Anne
- Denise Roberts as Gwen
- Monica Maughan as Nell
- Matthew Dyktynski as Brett
- Terry Norris as Ted
- Andrew Curry as Geoff
- Kerry Walker as Alison

== Box office ==
Road to Nhill grossed $884,949 at the box office in Australia.

== See also ==
- Cinema of Australia
