= Bogle–Chandler case =

1963 unsolved murder in Sydney, Australia

Gilbert Bogle
- Born: Gilbert Stanley Bogle; 1924
- Died: January 1, 1963 (aged 38–39) near Lane Cove River, Sydney, Australia
- Cause of death: Gas poisoning
- Occupation: Scientist
- Known for: Mysterious death

Margaret Chandler
- Born: Margaret Olive Morphett; 1934
- Died: January 1, 1963 (aged 28–29) near Lane Cove River, Sydney, Australia
- Cause of death: Gas poisoning
- Occupation: Scientist
- Known for: Mysterious death

The Bogle–Chandler case refers to the mysterious deaths of Dr. Gilbert Bogle and Margaret Chandler on the banks of the Lane Cove River in Sydney, Australia on 1 January 1963. The case became famous because of Dr Bogle's international standing, the circumstances in which the bodies were found and because the cause of death could not be established.

In 2006, Peter Butt, a filmmaker, suggested the cause of death was hydrogen sulphide (H_{2}S) possibly caused by an eruption of gas from the polluted river bed which may have led noxious fumes to pool in deadly quantities in the grove.

However, there have been no documented human deaths from hydrogen sulphide passively rising from a polluted river to poison bystanders onshore.

The wife of Dr Bogle, together with the husband of Mrs Chandler, supported colleague and close friend of Dr Bogle, Catherine Dalton's long standing claims that the pair had been killed for reasons relating to Cold War secrets.

== Background ==
Dr. Gilbert Stanley Bogle, born in 1924, was a physicist who worked at the Commonwealth Scientific and Industrial Research Organisation (CSIRO) on the campus of the University of Sydney. Married with three children, he was considered to be a brilliant scientist and had been a Rhodes Scholar. The coroner stood down a key female witness before she could give evidence, to protect her family and that of Bogle.

Margaret Olive Chandler (née Morphett), born in 1934, was the older sister of the screenwriter and author Tony Morphett. She was married to Geoffrey Chandler, who worked in the same CSIRO building as Bogle. They had two young children. Witnesses suggested that she may have been bored with her life and upset at her husband's philandering but, in reality, "free love" (free from guilty feelings) was normal practice in the Sydney Push connected to the university.

Bogle, the Chandlers, and several others attended a barbecue just prior to Christmas 1962. On the way home, Chandler told her husband that she was quite taken with Bogle. He told the police that he and his wife had "an understanding". He told her: "If you want to take Gib as a lover, if it would make you happy, you do it."

== Chatswood party ==
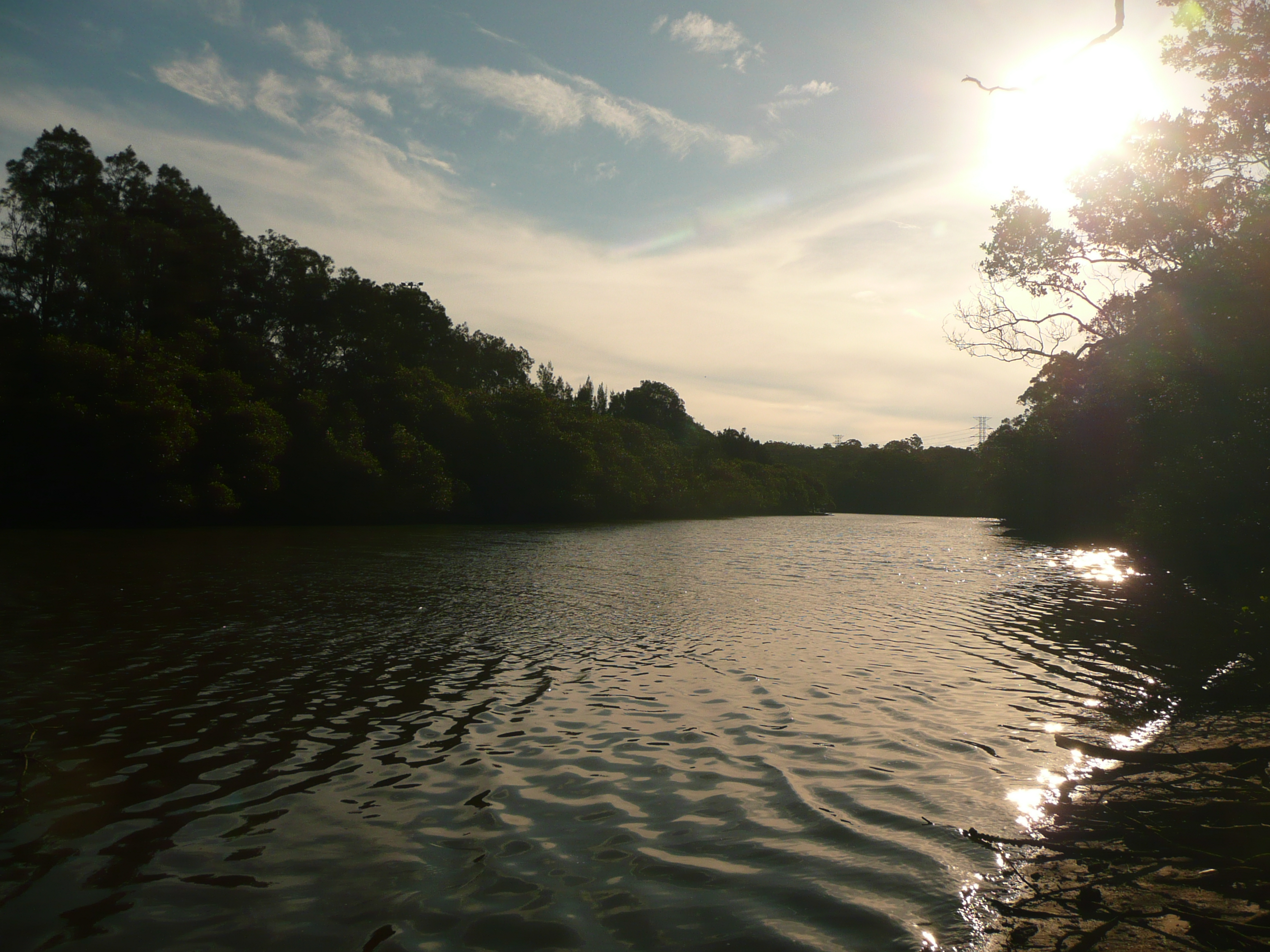
Lane Cove River, where the bodies of Bogle and Chandler were found.

Two of the other people at the barbecue were hosts Ken and Ruth Nash. Ken Nash also worked at the CSIRO. He invited the Chandlers to his New Year's Eve dinner party, to be held at his home in Waratah Street, Chatswood.

The Chandlers arrived at about 10 p.m. for the party, with Geoffrey Chandler casually dressed but other guests dressed formally. At about 11.30 p.m., he departed alone on the pretence of buying cigarettes and drove to a Sydney Push New Year's party held at the Balmain home of Ken Buckley, a senior lecturer in economic history at the University of Sydney. Arriving there at about midnight, he met Pamela Logan, with whom he was having an affair. They drove in tandem to her lodgings at Darlington.

He returned to the Chatswood party at 2.30 a.m. but decided to depart alone with his wife's understood preference that she be driven home to Croydon by Bogle. The Chandlers' two children were in the care of their maternal grandparents at Granville and were picked up in the morning by Chandler and Logan. Bogle and Chandler left the party soon after 4 a.m. and drove to the nearby Lane Cove River, which was then known as a lovers' lane.

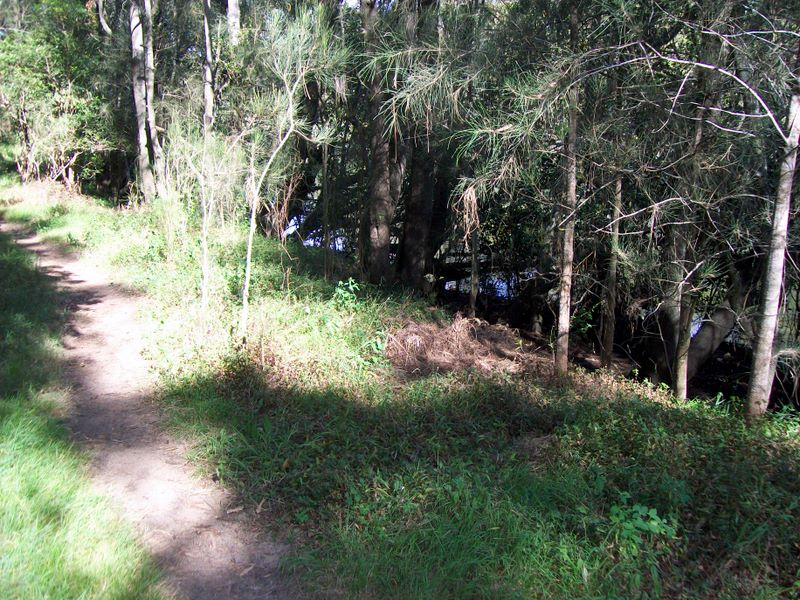
The site where the bodies were found, as it was in 2010.

== Discovery of the bodies ==
What happened next is still unclear but, several hours later, their bodies were found. Bogle's body was discovered near Fullers Bridge by two youths searching for golf balls. They saw his body face-down and presumed him to be drunk. When they returned an hour later to find that he had not moved and that his face had turned blue, they went to fetch help.

When police arrived at the scene they discovered that Bogle's body was half-undressed but with his shoes and socks still on. Somebody had placed his trousers over the back of his legs in such a way that he appeared to be dressed, but was not. A piece of carpet was also laid on top of his back underneath his jacket, which was laid perfectly on his back. The provenance of the carpet was actively investigated by police but is still unknown.

Shortly after this, Chandler's body was discovered by a constable about 15 metres away lying on cardboard boxes. She was also in a half state of undress, with her top removed, and her body had been entirely covered with broken-up cardboard beer boxes.

== Investigation ==
It was obvious that both had died in a panicked state from some sort of poisoning. At the scene were signs of vomit and excreta from both victims along with items of clothing found on the exposed bed of the river. Because New Year's Day was a public holiday, forensic examination of the bodies was delayed for 36 hours. When forensic examination did take place, no traces of any poison could be found.

The case attracted instant media publicity. It involved a high-society party, alleged wife-swapping, an unidentified third person at the death scene, and an unidentified poison. There was also speculation that Bogle had been assassinated due to his involvement in research important to the Cold War.

An inquest in May 1963 did not help to resolve the mystery. At the inquest, medical evidence was given that semen was present on the jacket but Chandler had not had sexual intercourse. The coroner, Mr. J. J. Loomes, concluded that Bogle and Chandler had died because of "...acute circulatory failure. But as to the circumstances under which such circulatory failure was brought about, the evidence does not permit me to say." In other words, he stated that Bogle and Chandler died either because their hearts stopped beating, or they stopped breathing.

== Poisoning theories ==
The police investigated around 1,000 hypotheses of the cause of death including cone shell poison, funnel-web spiders, aphrodisiacs, strychnine and the drug LSD. The state government analyst found no trace of LSD. In 1996, relic organ tissue samples were sent to America and new forensic techniques were applied to them. A first pass suggested the presence of LSD. A more sensitive scan on the same equipment came up negative—Bogle and Chandler had not used LSD. There have been no documented human deaths from an LSD overdose.

=== Hydrogen sulphide hypothesis ===
Peter Butt's documentary Who Killed Dr Bogle and Mrs Chandler?, which was shown on the ABC in September 2006, suggests that the two deaths were caused by accidental hydrogen sulphide poisoning.

In August 2016, author Butt also published details of an alleged 1965 conversation between an unidentified Canberra psychologist and an unidentified woman who had claimed to be an eyewitness of the deaths. She reported the pair to be staggering around and a conclusion that the deaths were caused by hydrogen sulphide (H_{2}S). In 2022, a 5-part podcast series re-covering the case was also released by Butt.

Supporting evidence for this theory includes:

- In the 1940s and 50s, the local council received scores of letters from residents complaining of the smell of "rotten eggs" coming from the river, causing nausea and breathing difficulties. There was also a series of massive fish kills. With the residents facing permanent evacuation, the Maritime Services Board conducted a year-long study of the river. It found that the bottom muds were saturated to a depth of 50 centimetres (20 in) with H_{2}S and that very large and rapid releases of hydrogen sulphide gas could occur from a section of the river impounded by the weir. The source was identified as a flour mill that had pumped millions of litres of waste into the river since the 1890s. The worst affected location was within a quarter-mile of the weir, which had acted to stem the flushing of the river and exacerbate the issue, exactly where Bogle and Chandler died.
- A purple discoloration was seen in the victims' blood which is characteristic of H_{2}S poisoning. This phenomenon is not related to other colour changes in the blood such as cyanosis, or methaemoglobin/methemoglobinemia.

== See also ==
- List of unsolved deaths
