= John Moore (Australian actor) =

Australian actor

- Occupation: Actor

John Moore is an Australian actor. He has played lead roles in the films The Life of Harry Dare, and Blackfellas. He was nominated for the AFI Award for Best Actor in a Leading Role in 1993, for Blackfellas, and in 1995, for The Life Of Harry Dare, and was nominated for the AFI Award for Best Actor in a Supporting Role in 1991 for Deadly. He was also nominated for the 2003 AFI Award for Open Craft Award in a Non-feature Film for his acting in the short film Cold Turkey.

Other roles include a lead in Zombie Brigade, Pitch Black, Home and Away and the original stage production of Bran Nue Dae.
