= Japanese Story =

- Theatrical release poster
- Directed by: Sue Brooks
- Written by: Alison Tilson
- Produced by: Sue Maslin
- Starring: Toni Collette; Gotaro Tsunashima
- Cinematography: Ian Baker
- Edited by: Jill Bilcock
- Music by: Elizabeth Drake
- Distributed by: Palace Films
- Release date: 25 September 2003 (Australia)
- Running time: 110 minutes
- Country: Australia
- Languages: English; Japanese
- Budget: $5,740,000
- Box office: $4,050,497

Japanese Story is a 2003 Australian romantic drama film directed by Sue Brooks. It was screened in the Un Certain Regard section at the 2003 Cannes Film Festival.

== Plot ==
Sandy Edwards (played by Toni Collette) is a director in a company that designs geological software in Perth, Western Australia. Her business partner manipulates her into agreeing to act as a guide for a Japanese businessman visiting mines in the Pilbara desert, hoping that he will purchase the software. When Hiromitsu Tachibana (Gotaro Tsunashima) arrives, he treats Sandy like a chauffeur, and he seems more intent on self-discovery in the wilderness than on buying computer software. At first, Sandy is angered by his reserved, demanding demeanor. On their first journey into the desert, Hiromitsu, feeling insecure, talks more on his phone with friends in Japan than he does to Sandy. He also insists that she drive further than planned. The terrain proves too much for the pair's vehicle, which becomes stuck in the sand. After a series of desperate attempts to free the vehicle, including digging a dead man anchor, their winch burns out. Sandy wants to use Hiromitsu's phone to call people who can rescue them, but Hiromitsu refuses. This forces them to spend the night stranded together. The next day, Hiromitsu, conscious that his refusal had placed them in danger, wakes up much earlier than Sandy and builds a track of sticks over which they can drive out of the sand; the manoeuvre is successful. Now that they are on the road again, they become more social and a friendship starts between them which, in isolated surroundings uninterrupted by their work, grows quickly and honestly. Later, at a motel, they have sexual intercourse. Only after does Sandy learn that Hiromitsu has a wife and children in Japan.

On another journey to scenic spots, Hiromitsu and Sandy share a quiet moment and kiss each other, eventually having sexual intercourse again. Afterwards, Sandy runs into a swimming hole nearby. Hiromitsu follows her, diving into the shallow water before she can warn him, and disappears. Sandy frantically calls for him and, after a moment, his lifeless body resurfaces. In shock at his sudden death, Sandy struggles to deal with the situation, dragging his body into their vehicle and carefully washing it before driving for hours to the nearest town. Back in Perth, Sandy cannot comprehend the violent end to her journey. Reality intrudes in the form of Hiromitsu's grieving widow, Yukiko, and Sandy tries to understand how Hiromitsu's life had ended before she had understood his place in hers.

In the ending, Sandy watches a Qantas aircraft, with Yukiko on board and the body of Hiromitsu's body in the cargo, taxi in preparation for takeoff.

== Cast ==
- Toni Collette – Sandy Edwards
- Gotaro Tsunashima (綱島郷太郎 Tsunashima Gōtarō) – Hiromitsu Tachibana
- Matthew Dyktynski – Bill Baird
- Lynette Curran – Mum
- Yumiko Tanaka (田中由美子 Tanaka Yumiko) – Yukiko Tachibana
- Kate Atkinson – Jackie
- Bill Young – Jimmy Smithers
- Reg Evans – Bloke in Row Boat
- George Shevtsov – James
- Justine Clarke – Jane
- Igor Sas – Fraser
- Mike Frencham – Blake
- John Howard – Richards
- Phil Bennett – Barman
- Heath Bergersen – Petrol Bloke
- Peter Heather - Police Officer 1
- Ray Curren - Police Officer 2
- Peter Lester - Chef

== Characters ==
Okinawan Hawaiian academic Wesley Iwao Ueunten (上運天 巌 Ueunten Iwao) described Hiromitsu as "as awkward, stiff, and effeminate—exactly the opposite portrayal of white males."

== Soundtrack ==
The Ryukyuan song Tinsagu nu Hana (Chinsagu no Hana) is in the film's soundtrack. Shelley Scown was the vocalist, whilst Elizabeth Drake did the orchestral work. The song is used in the film's ending. Felicity Collins of La Trobe University wrote that some movie critics from Japan perceived the usage of the song as "a contentious issue" because the song specifically has an Okinawan character and yet is not something generally related to Japan, and "secondly because the fragility and beauty of this song, about upholding Okinawan identity, seems incongruous in an Australian film".

== Box office ==
Japanese Story grossed $4,520,000 at the box office in Australia.

== Reception ==
Japanese Story received generally positive reviews, currently holding an approval rating of 70% on Rotten Tomatoes.

Acclaimed film critic Roger Ebert awarded the film 3 and a half out of 4 stars and wrote, "This is that rare sort of film that is not about what happens, but about what happens then." Similarly, writing for BBC.com, critic Nev Pierce, praised uniqueness of the story, arguing, "Most movies take you to a pre-ordained end: you know the guy will get the girl, the hero defeat the villain, the 'right' win through might. But this genre-blending picture is as unpredictable as real-life, taking you on an emotional journey where the departure point never suggests the final destination. It's wrong-footing and refreshing, you really are being told a story, not just seeing an on-screen echo of your expectations."

A modern day review by James Croot writing for Stuff NZ, praised the film, stating, "A far deeper tale.... Japanese Story is an emotional rollercoaster of a movie.".

=== Accolades ===
Award	Category	Subject	Result
AACTA Award (2003 AFI Awards)	Best Film	Sue Maslin	Won
AACTA Award (2003 AFI Awards)	Best Direction	Sue Brooks	Won
AACTA Award (2003 AFI Awards)	Best Original Screenplay	Alison Tilson	Won
AACTA Award (2003 AFI Awards)	Best Actor	Gotaro Tsunashima	Nominated
AACTA Award (2003 AFI Awards)	Best Actress	Toni Collette	Won
AACTA Award (2003 AFI Awards)	Best Cinematography	Ian Baker	Won
AACTA Award (2003 AFI Awards)	Best Editing	Jill Bilcock	Won
AACTA Award (2003 AFI Awards)	Best Original Music Score	Elizabeth Drake	Won
AACTA Award (2003 AFI Awards)	Best Sound	Livia Ruzic	Won
AACTA Award (2003 AFI Awards)	Best Sound	Peter Grace	Won
AACTA Award (2003 AFI Awards)	Best Sound	Peter Smith	Won
AACTA Award (2003 AFI Awards)	Best Production Design	Paddy Reardon	Nominated
AWGIE Award	Best Writing in a Feature Film - Original	Alison Tilson	Won
Bangkok International Film Festival	Golden Kinnaree Award for Best Film	Sue Brooks	Nominated
Chicago International Film Festival	Gold Hugo - New Directors Competition	Sue Brooks	Nominated
FCCA Awards	Best Film	Sue Maslin	Won
FCCA Awards	Best Director	Sue Brooks	Won
FCCA Awards	Best Original Screenplay	Alison Tilson	Nominated
FCCA Awards	Best Female Actor	Toni Collette	Won
FCCA Awards	Best Music Score	Elizabeth Drake	Won
FCCA Awards	Best Editing	Jill Bilcock	Nominated
FCCA Awards	Best Cinematography	Ian Baker	Won
Inside Film Awards	Best Feature Film	Sue Maslin	Won
Inside Film Awards	Best Direction	Sue Brooks	Won
Inside Film Awards	Best Script	Alison Tilson	Nominated
Inside Film Awards	Best Actor	Gotaro Tsunashima	Nominated
Inside Film Awards	Best Actress	Toni Collette	Won
Inside Film Awards	Best Cinematography	Ian Baker	Won
Inside Film Awards	Best Editing	Jill Bilcock	Nominated
Inside Film Awards	Best Music	Elizabeth Drake	Nominated
Miami International Film Festival	FIPRESCI Prize	Sue Brooks	Won
Satellite Award	Best Actress	Toni Collette	Nominated
Screen Music Awards, Australia	Best Feature Film Score	Elizabeth Drake	Won

== See also ==
- Cinema of Australia
