= Silent Storm (film) =

- Directed by: Peter Butt
- Produced by: Peter Butt; Anna Greive; Rob McAuley
- Starring: Bille Brown; Paula Arundell
- Music by: Guy Gross
- Distributed by: Film Australia; SBS independent
- Release date: 2003
- Running time: 90 minutes
- Country: Australia
- Language: English

Silent Storm is a 2003 Australian documentary film written and directed by Peter Butt.

== Synopsis ==
From 1957 to 1978, scientists secretly removed bone samples from over 21,000 dead Australians as they searched for evidence of the deadly poison, Strontium 90 – a by-product of nuclear testing. Silent Storm reveals the story behind this astonishing case of officially sanctioned 'body-snatching'. Set against a backdrop of the Cold War, the saga follows celebrated scientist, Hedley Marston, as he attempts to blow the whistle on radioactive contamination and challenge official claims that British atomic tests posed no threat to the Australian people. Marston's findings are not only disputed, he is targeted as 'a scientist of counter-espionage interest'.

The film is narrated by Paula Arundell.

== Cast ==
- Bille Brown as Hedley Marston
- Paula Arundell as Narrator
- Avon Hudson as Self
- John F. Kennedy as Self (archive footage)
- Linus Pauling as Self (archive footage)
- William Penney as Self (archive footage)
- Edward Teller as Self (archive footage)
- Ernest Titterton as Self (archive footage)

== See also ==
- Britain, Australia and the Bomb
- List of films about nuclear issues
- British nuclear tests at Maralinga
- McClelland Royal Commission
- Montebello Islands
