= Who Killed Dr Bogle and Mrs Chandler? =

- Promotional poster
- Directed by: Peter Butt
- Starring: Nicholas Hope; Rhys Muldoon; Hugo Weaving; Matthew O'Sullivan
- Music by: Guy Gross
- Country of origin: Australia
- Original language: English

Production
- Producers: Peter Butt; Kris Wyld
- Running time: 55 minutes

Original release
- Network: ABC
- Release: 7 September 2006

Who Killed Dr Bogle and Mrs Chandler? is an Australian documentary film about the mysterious deaths of Dr Gilbert Bogle and Mrs Margaret Chandler in Sydney, Australia in 1963. Although it was assumed the couple were murdered, police investigators could find or produce no evidence that it was actually murder. The documentary, directed and written by Australian documentary film maker Peter Butt, presents unique evidence to suggest the couple died from hydrogen sulphide poisoning emanating from a river.

== Summary ==
When the half-naked bodies of brilliant physicist, Dr Gilbert Bogle, and his lover, Mrs Margaret Chandler, were found in bizarre circumstances on a Sydney riverbank in 1963, it set into play an unprecedented forensic investigation.

Autopsies offered little clue as to how the couple died, only that there were signs of a rapidly acting poison. Despite assistance from the FBI and Scotland Yard, the poison was never identified. At the end of a long and controversial coronial inquest, no cause of death, killer or motive could be found.

In the ensuing years, scores of tabloid theories have been put forward, from LSD to Cold War assassinations. But in the minds of many, including the police, Margaret Chandler's husband, Geoffrey, was the likely culprit.

== Cast ==
Role	Actor
Dr Gilbert Bogle	Rhys Muldoon
Mrs Margaret Chandler	Octavia Barron Martin
Geoffrey Chandler	Nicholas Hope
Coroner	Matthew O'Sullivan
Legal Representative 2	Peter Sumner
Narrator (voice)	Hugo Weaving

== Reception ==
=== Television ===
The film premiered on the Australian Broadcasting Corporation on 7 September 2006. 1.8 million people in the five major capitals tuned in, plus an estimated 700,000 viewers in the other cities and regional areas, making it the most-watched Australian documentary ever screened on the network, as well as the most-watched program in 2006 on the ABC. It was the number one program in Sydney, Melbourne, Adelaide, Perth and Brisbane.

=== Awards and recognition ===
Who Killed Dr Bogle and Mrs Chandler? was well received by television critics, scientists, and politicians and won Most Outstanding Documentary in the 2007 TV Week Logies.

Preceded by He's Coming South: The Attack on Sydney Harbour	Australian Logie For Most Outstanding Documentary or Documentary Series; 2007	Succeeded by Constructing Australia: The Bridge
