= Sue Brooks =

Australian film director

- Occupations: Film director, film producer
- Years active: 1984–present

Sue Brooks is an Australian film director and producer.

She has directed five films since 1984, the first being The Drover's Wife, a short film based on a story by Murray Bail.

She won the "Golden Alexander" (first prize) for Best Feature-Length Film at the Thessaloniki International Film Festival for her film Road to Nhill (1997). Her film Japanese Story, starring Toni Collette, was screened in the Un Certain Regard section at the 2003 Cannes Film Festival.

== Filmography ==
- The Drover's Wife (1984) short film
- An Ordinary Woman (1988)
- Road to Nhill (1997)
- Japanese Story (2003)
- Subdivision (2009)
- Looking for Grace (2015)
