= Tim Sanders (filmmaker) =

Australian film producer

- Occupation: Film producer

Tim Sanders is a New Zealand film producer.

== Biography ==
Tim Sanders was born in Adelaide, Australia. He studied film as part of an arts degree at Flinders University in the 1970s. He has worked on almost 40 feature film or major television productions in 18 countries around the world.

== Awards ==
Sanders has won two BAFTAs, an MTV award, an AFI award, and has received a Golden Globe Award nomination as well as several Best Film and Best Drama awards in Australia and New Zealand.

== Filmography ==
=== Films ===
- The Lord of the Rings: The Fellowship of the Ring (2001) — producer
- Whale Rider (2002) — producer
- Perfect Creature (2007) — producer
- The Insatiable Moon (2010) — executive producer
