= Peter Butt =

Australian film director

- Born: 1 December 1954 (age 71); Sydney, Australia
- Occupations: Producer, director, writer
- Awards: Logie Award for Most Outstanding Documentary; 2006 Who Killed Dr Bogle and Mrs Chandler?

Peter Butt (born 1954) is an Australian film producer, director, writer and author. He produces investigative documentaries for television about 20th century global and Australian history. Most of his films have been in conjunction with Film Australia, the Australian Broadcasting Corporation and SBS. Peter is also a published True Crime author.

== Films and books ==
- No Such a Place (1981) was Butt's first work as a young director. No Such a Place chronicled the rise and fall of the Glen Davis shale-mining town and was selected to screen with Peter Weir's Gallipoli in more than 60 cinemas around the country.
- Out of Darkness (1983) explores the origins of the First Australians through archaeology. Produced for ABC.
- The Virgin Earth (1984) looks at various scientific theories related to the origin of life on Earth. Produced for ABC.
- Life's Labour's Lost (1985) asks whether there is a future for work in the robot age. Produced for ABC.
- China—The Long March (1986) follows stills photographer Leo Meier as he travels the route of the Long March for seven weeks to photograph the people and places of today's China for a photographic exhibition commemorating the march's 50th anniversary. The film tells the story of how, in 1934, the Communist Party undertook a massive military retreat circling to the north, eventually covering 8,000 km. It then regrouped, and the Red Army, under the command of Mao Zedong, finally defeated the Nationalist Party and took control of China. Produced for TCN9.
- My Father, My Country (1988) relates a 1938 journey by three Australian patrol officers into the highlands of Papua New Guinea. Produced for Film Australia, National Geographic Channel and the BBC.
- The Liners (1996–97). This high-rating four-part series charted the influence of the ocean liner on world history. It received directing and editing nominations in the 1998 AFI Awards. Produced for ABC, Channel 4 in the UK and the Learning Channel in the United States.
- Lies, Spies and Olympics (1999) explores the impact both the Cold War and local politics had on the 1956 Melbourne Olympic Games. For three weeks in the spring of 1956, the XVI Olympiad stopped the nation. It was an opportunity for Australia to show the world what a young, ambitious country could achieve. Indeed, the Melbourne Olympic Games would become etched in Australian mythology as a watershed in its sporting, cultural and civic history. But beyond the myth is controversy – a saga of deceit, clashing egos and local and international politics that almost turned the Melbourne Games into a national disaster. Butt directed, wrote and edited. Produced for Film Australia in association with Rob McAuley Productions.
- Fortress Australia (2001) explores Australia's attempts to acquire atomic weapons during the 1950s and 1960s. Set against a backdrop of the cold war the film reveals the motives of the politicians, defence chiefs and scientists who aspired to protect their country with a nuclear arsenal. From uranium exploration and guided weapons research to A-bomb tests on Australian soil, the film reveals how Canberra aided both Britain and the United States in the hope of sharing their nuclear secrets. But fears of KGB infiltration of crucial political offices thwarted attempts to acquire weapons from Britain. In response, successive Australian governments pondered whether to go down the controversial path of producing home-grown nuclear weapons. Produced for Film Australia. This documentary was subject to a complaint to the ABC's Independent Complaints Review Panel. The complaint was rejected although the panel did find that the documentary was not balanced.
- The Battleships (2000) is a four-part history series written and directed by Butt about the development of the world's most powerful and controversial ships. Produced with Rob McAuley Productions for the ABC.
- Silent Storm (2004) recounts a story of officially sanctioned 'body-snatching' between 1957 and 1978, when scientists secretly removed bone samples from over 21,000 dead Australians in a search for evidence of the deadly poison, Strontium 90—a by-product of nuclear testing. Silent Storm screened at many international festivals and was nominated for four AFI awards. Produced for Film Australia, it was winner of the Earth Vision Grand Prize (Best Film) at the Tokyo Global Environmental Film Festival and the International Gold Panda Awards for Documentary at the Sichuan TV Festival.
- The Airships (2005) (Rob McAuley Productions) A three-part history series directed and written by Butt about the world's largest flying machines. Produced with Rob McAuley Productions for ABC.
- Who Killed Dr Bogle and Mrs Chandler? (2006) re-examines the mysterious Bogle-Chandler case, unsolved for four decades. The documentary reveals new scientific evidence suggesting that the two deaths may have been caused by accidental hydrogen sulphide poisoning, a hypothesis for which there is a great deal of supporting evidence. Produced for Film Australia, it was the ABC's most-watched documentary ever: which won him an Australian Logie.
- The Prime Minister is Missing (2008). Prime Minister Harold Holt disappeared in the sea without trace in December 1967. Police investigations concluded that it was accidental drowning, but there was much rumour and speculation about the event. Produced for Film Australia.
- I, Spry – The Rise and Fall of a Master Spy (2010) The rise and fall of Australia’s master spy, a complex Machiavellian character, who attempts to counter the Communist threat, but finds himself in a ‘wilderness of mirrors' where nobody is who or what they seem. Produced by Blackwattle Films for ABC
- Final Rendezvous (2020) During the early 1960's Australia's security service, ASIO, secretly filmed meetings between a KGB officer, Ivan Skripov and his British-born agent, Kay Marshall. Unknown to Skripov, Marshall was a double agent – code name Sylvia. The case held the promise of cracking a nuclear spy ring – but its inexplicable collapse haunted ASIO for decades. Reinvestigating the case, Final Rendezvous closely examines the surveillance film and uncovers what went wrong.
- Who Killed Dr Bogle and Mrs Chandler? (2012) A non–fiction book which re-examines the Bogle-Chandler case.
- Merchants of Menace – The True Story of the Nugan Hand Bank Scandal (2015) A non–fiction book which re-examines the death of Australian merchant banker, Frank Nugan, and the disappearance of his American partner, Michael Hand. Investigators uncover evidence of gunrunning, money laundering for drug traffickers and connections to the CIA. Brimming with interviews of investigators and an insider, the book shines new light on the case and then goes on the hunt for Michael Hand.
- The Petrified Woman (2023) A non–fiction book which re-examines the unsolved case of the petrified woman whose body was found floating in the Murray River in 1952.
