= Australian Film Institute Award for Best Documentary =

Australian film award

AACTA Award for Best Documentary
- Country: Australia
- Presented by: Australian Academy of Cinema and Television Arts (AACTA)
- First award: 1958
- Website: http://www.aacta.org

The AFI Award for Best Documentary was an award presented by the Australian Film Institute in the annual AFI Awards. The category was superseded in 2008 with an award for Best Feature Length Documentary.

== Winners and nominees ==
Winners are highlighted and in bold.

Year	Film	Recipient(s)
**1980s**
**1980** (22nd)
**1980** (22nd)	**Frontline**	**David Bradbury** (Director)
**1980** (22nd)	Bird of the Thunder Woman	David Parer (Director)
**1980** (22nd)	Evictions	Richard Lowenstein (Director)
**1980** (22nd)	Give Trees a Chance	Jeni Kendall (Director)
**1980** (22nd)	Winter's Harvest / Raccolto D'Inverno	Brian McKenzie (Director)
**1981** (23rd)
**1981** (23rd)	**Stepping Out**	**Chris Noonan** (Producer / Director)
**1981** (23rd)	Backs to the Blast	Harry Bardwell (Producer / Director)
**1981** (23rd)	Public Enemy Number One	David Bradbury (Producer / Director)
**1981** (23rd)	Waiting for Harry	Australian Institute of Aboriginal Studies (Production Company), Kim McKenzie (Director)
**1982** (24th)
**1982** (24th)	**Angels of War**	**Andrew Pike, Hank Nelson, Gavan Daws** (Producer)
**1982** (24th)	Journey to the End of the Night	Peter Tammer (Producer)
**1982** (24th)	Two Laws	Carolyn Strachan, Alessandro Cavadini (Producer)
**1983** (25th)
**1983** (25th)	**First Contact**	**Robin Anderson, Bob Connolly** (Producer)
**1983** (25th)	Birdmen of Kilimanjaro	Anne Folland (Producer)
**1983** (25th)	Double Concerto	Angela Catterns (Producer)
**1983** (25th)	Peppimenarti	Ron Iddon (Producer)
**1984** (26th)
**1984** (26th)	**Kemira: Diary of a Strike**	**Tom Zubrycki** (Producer / Director)
**1984** (26th)	Antarctic Man: 'This Is Not A Place For Humans'	ABC Natural History Unit (Production Company), David Parer (Producer / Director)
**1984** (26th)	Celso and Cora	Gary Kildea (Producer / Director)
**1984** (26th)	For Love or Money	Margot Oliver, Megan McMurchy, Jeni Thornley (Producer), Megan McMurchy, Jeni Thornley (Director), Margot Nash (Editor)
**1985** (27th)
**1985** (27th)	**Raoul Wallenberg: Between the Lines**	**Bob Weis** (Producer)
**1985** (27th)	Collum Calling Canberra	Australian Institute of Aboriginal Studies (Production Company), David MacDougall, Judith MacDougall (Producer / Director)
**1985** (27th)	I'll Be Home For Christmas	Brian McKenzie (Producer / Director)
**1985** (27th)	Munda Nyuringu: He's Taken The Land, He Believes It Is His, He Won't Give It Back	Robert Bropho, Jan Roberts (Producer / Director)
**1986** (28th)
**1986** (28th)	**Chile: Hasta Cuando?**	**David Bradbury** (Producer)
**1986** (28th)	Flight Of The Windhorse	Richard Dennison (Producer)
**1986** (28th)	Half Life	Dennis O'Rourke (Producer)
**1986** (28th)	Pitjiri: The Snake That Will Not Sink	Karen Hughes (Producer)
**1986** (28th)	Rocking the Foundations	Pat Fiske (Producer)
**1986** (28th)	Some Babies Die	Martyn Down (Producer)
**1987** (29th)
**1987** (29th)	**Painting the Town**	**Trevor Graham** (Director)
**1987** (29th)	Friends and Enemies	Tom Zubrycki (Director)
**1987** (29th)	How the West Was Lost	David Noakes (Director)
**1987** (29th)	The Musical Mariner (Part One)	Bill Leimbach (Director)
**1988** (30th)
**1988** (30th)	**Cane Toads, An Unnatural History**	**Film Australia** (Production Company), **Mark Lewis** (Producer)
**1988** (30th)	Riding the Gale	Kim Batterham, Genni Batterham (Producer)
**1988** (30th)	South of the Border	David Bradbury (Producer)
**1988** (30th)	Thanks Girls and Goodbye	Sue Maslin, Sue Hardisty (Producer)
**1989** (31st)
**1989** (31st)	**Joe Leahy's Neighbours**	**Robin Anderson, Bob Connolly** (Producer)
**1989** (31st)	A Little Life	Deborah Howlett (Producer)
**1989** (31st)	Confessions of a Simple Surgeon	NSW Dept of TAFE (Production Company)
**1989** (31st)	Philippines, My Philippines	Maree Delofski, Chris Nash (Producer)
**1990s**
**1990** (32nd)
**1990** (32nd)	**Handmaidens and Battleaxes**	**Rosalind Gillespie** (Director)
**1990** (32nd)	Lord of the Bush	Tom Zubrycki (Director)
**1990** (32nd)	Senso Daughters	Noriko Sekiguchi (Director)
**1990** (32nd)	Tightrope Dancer	Ruth Cullen (Director)
**1991** (33rd)
**1991** (33rd)	**Canto A La Vida**	**Lucia Salinas Briones** (Director)
**1991** (33rd)	Chainsaw	Shirley Barrett (Director)
**1991** (33rd)	Cowboy, Maria In Town	Les McLaren, Annie Stiven (Director)
**1991** (33rd)	Eclipse of the Man-Made Sun	Nicolette Freeman, Amanda Stewart (Director)
**1992** (34th)
**1992** (34th)	**Black Harvest**	**Robin Anderson, Bob Connolly** (Director)
**1992** (34th)	God's Girls: Stories from an Australian Convent	Cherie Nowlan (Director)
**1992** (34th)	Mr Neal is Entitled To Be An Agitator	Daryl Dellora (Director)
**1992** (34th)	The Serpent And The Cross	Chris Hilton (Director)
**1993** (35th)
**1993** (35th)	**Exile And The Kingdom**	**Frank Rijavec** (Director)
**1993** (35th)	**For All The World To See**	**Pat Fiske** (Director)
**1993** (35th)	Homelands	Tom Zubrycki (Director)
**1993** (35th)	The Journey	Christopher Tuckfield (Director)
**1994** (36th)
**1994** (36th)	**50 Years Of Silence**	**James Bradley, Ned Lander, Carol Ruff** (Director)
**1994** (36th)	Eternity	Lawrence Johnston (Director)
**1994** (36th)	The Last Magician	Tracey Holloway, Liz Thompson (Director)
**1994** (36th)	Watch the Watch	Malcolm McDonald (Director)
**1995** (37th)
**1995** (37th)	**The Good Looker**	**Claire Jager** (Director)
**1995** (37th)	Pat And Eddy's Greyhound Racing Family	Brian McKenzie (Director)
**1995** (37th)	Raskols	Sally Browning, Anou Borrey (Director)
**1995** (37th)	Witness	Michael Buckley (Director)
**1996** (38th)
**1996** (38th)	**Not Fourteen Again**	**Gillian Armstrong** (Director)
**1996** (38th)	Billal	Tom Zubrycki (Director)
**1996** (38th)	Hatred	Mitzi Goldman (Director)
**1996** (38th)	Nearly Normal Nimbin: Part One	Jeni Kendall, Paul Tait (Director)
**1997** (39th)
**1997** (39th)	**Mabo: Life of an Island Man**	**Trevor Graham** (Director)
**1997** (39th)	Colour Bars	Mahmoud Yekta (Director)
**1997** (39th)	Exile in Sarajevo	Tahir Cambis, Alma Sahbaz (Director)
**1997** (39th)	The Butler	Anna Kannava (Director)
**1998** (40th)
**1998** (40th)	**The Dragons of Galapagos**	**David Parer, Elizabeth Parer-Cook**
**1998** (40th)	Mohamed Ali's Happy Day Feast	Catherine Dyson
**1998** (40th)	Paying for the Piper	Ed Punchard
**1998** (40th)	Urban Clan	Aanya Whitehead, Paul Humfress
**1999** (41st)
**1999** (41st)	**Hephzibah**	**Curtis Levy**
**1999** (41st)	A Calcutta Christmas	Denise Haslem
**1999** (41st)	Original Schtick	Peter George, Bronwyne Smith
**1999** (41st)	Sadness	Michael McMahon, Megan McMurchy
**2000s**
**2000** (42nd)
**2000** (42nd)	**The Diplomat**	**Sally Browning, Wilson da Silva**
**2000** (42nd)	A Death in the Family	Terry Carlyon, Robyn Miller
**2000** (42nd)	Stolen Generations	Tom Zubrycki
**2000** (42nd)	Uncle Chatzkel	Rod Freedman, Emile Sherman
**2001** (43rd)
**2001** (43rd)	**Facing the Music**	**Bob Connolly, Robin Anderson**
**2001** (43rd)	Cunnamulla	Dennis O'Rourke
**2001** (43rd)	Playing The Game - Episode 3	Andrew Ogilvie, Peter Du Cane
**2001** (43rd)	Wonderboy	Andrew Wiseman, Richard Keddie
**2002** (44th)
**2002** (44th)	**A Wedding in Ramallah**	**Sherine Salama**
**2002** (44th)	East Timor - Birth of a Nation: Rosa's Story	Luigi Acquisto, Stella Zammataro
**2002** (44th)	Rainbow Bird & Monster Man	John Lewis
**2002** (44th)	The Diaries Of Vaslav Nijinski	Paul Cox, Aanya Whitehead
**2003** (45th)
**2003** (45th)	**Wildness**	**Michael McMahon**
**2003** (45th)	Painting with Light in a Dark World	Renata Schuman, Ellenor Cox
**2003** (45th)	Silent Storm	Peter Butt, Rob McAuely
**2003** (45th)	The Original Mermaid	Ian Collie
**2004** (46th)
**2004** (46th)	**The President Versus David Hicks**	**Curtis Levy**
**2004** (46th)	Helen's War: Portrait of a Dissident	Sonja Armstrong, Anne Pick
**2004** (46th)	Lonely Boy Richard	Denise Haslem, Rosemary Hesp
**2004** (46th)	The Men Who Would Conquer China	Nick Torrens
**2005** (47th)
**2005** (47th)	**Land Mines - A Love Story**	**Dennis O'Rourke**
**2005** (47th)	Girl in a Mirror	Helen Bowden
**2005** (47th)	Jabe Babe: A Heightened Life	Janet Merewether, Deborah Szapiro, Georgia Wallace-Crabbe
**2005** (47th)	Killers In Eden	Klaus Toft
**2006** (48th)
**2006** (48th)	**Hunt Angels**	**Sue Maslin**
**2006** (48th)	Raul The Terrible	Carlos Alperin
**2006** (48th)	Vietnam Nurses	Beth Frey, Lizzette Atkins
**2006** (48th)	Welcome 2 My Deaf World	Sally Ingleton
**2007** (49th)
**2007** (49th)	**Forbidden Lie$**	**Sally Regan, Anna Broinowski**
**2007** (49th)	4	Joanna Buggy, Tim Slade
**2007** (49th)	Global Haywire	Claude Gonzalez
**2007** (49th)	Words from the City	Philippa Campey
