= 1992 Australian Film Institute Awards =

Australian film and TV awards ceremony

34th Australian Film Institute Awards
- Date: 16 October 1992
- Site: World Congress Centre, Melbourne, Victoria

Highlights
- Best Film: Strictly Ballroom
- Most awards: Film: Strictly Ballroom (8); TV: Brides of Christ (4)
- Most nominations: Film: Strictly Ballroom (13); TV: Phoenix (8)

The 34th Australian Film Institute Awards (generally known as the AFI Awards) were held at the World Congress Centre in Melbourne on 16 October 1992. Presented by the Australian Film Institute (AFI), the awards celebrated the best in Australian feature film, documentary, short film and television productions of 1992.

Feature film Strictly Ballroom received eight awards including Best Film. Romper Stomper won three and The Last Days of Chez Nous and Black Robe each won a single award. Miniseries Brides of Christ won four awards for television including Best Television Mini Series or Telefeature. Director and producer Lee Robinson received the Raymond Longford Award for lifetime achievement.

== Winners and nominees ==
Winners are listed first and highlighted in boldface.

=== Feature film ===
Best Film	Best Achievement in Direction
**Strictly Ballroom – Tristram Miall**; Black Robe – Robert Lantos, Sue Milliken, Stephane Reichel; Romper Stomper – Ian Pringle, Daniel Scharf; The Last Days of Chez Nous – Jan Chapman	**Baz Luhrmann – Strictly Ballroom**; Bruce Beresford – Black Robe; Geoffrey Wright – Romper Stomper; Gillian Armstrong – The Last Days of Chez Nous
Best Performance by an Actor in a Leading Role	Best Performance by an Actress in a Leading Role
**Russell Crowe – Romper Stomper**; Lothaire Bluteau – Black Robe; Paul Mercurio – Strictly Ballroom; Bruno Ganz – The Last Days of Chez Nous	**Lisa Harrow – The Last Days of Chez Nous**; Miranda Otto – Daydream Believer; Claudia Karvan – Redheads; Tara Morice – Strictly Ballroom
Best Performance by an Actor in a Supporting Role	Best Performance by an Actress in a Supporting Role
**Barry Otto – Strictly Ballroom**; August Schellenberg – Black Robe; Daniel Pollock – Romper Stomper; Bill Hunter – The Last Days of Chez Nous	**Pat Thomson – Strictly Ballroom**; Willa O'Neill – Secrets; Gia Carides – Strictly Ballroom; Miranda Otto – The Last Days of Chez Nous
Best Screenplay	Best Achievement in Cinematography
**Baz Luhrmann, Craig Pearce – Strictly Ballroom**; Brian Moore – Black Robe; David Caesar – Greenkeeping; Helen Garner – The Last Days of Chez Nous	**Peter James – Black Robe**; James Bartle – Hammers Over the Anvil; Steve Mason – Strictly Ballroom; Geoffrey Simpson – The Last Days of Chez Nous
Best Achievement in Editing	Best Achievement in Sound
**Jill Bilcock – Strictly Ballroom**; Tim Wellburn – Black Robe; Bill Murphy – Romper Stomper; Nicholas Beauman – The Last Days of Chez Nous	**Steve Burgess, David Lee, Frank Lipson – Romper Stomper**; Phil Judd, Penn Robinson, Gary Wilkins – Black Robe; Phil Judd, Guntis Sics, Karin Whittington – Love in Limbo; Bruce Brown, Ben Osmo, Roger Savage – Strictly Ballroom
Best Original Music Score	Best Achievement in Production Design
**John Clifford White – Romper Stomper**; Georges Delerue – Black Robe; Felicity Fox – Redheads; Paul Grabowsky – The Last Days of Chez Nous	**Catherine Martin – Strictly Ballroom**; David McKay – Love in Limbo; Steven Jones-Evans – Romper Stomper; Janet Patterson – The Last Days of Chez Nous
Best Achievement in Costume Design
**Angus Strathie – Strictly Ballroom**; Renée April, John Hay – Black Robe; Clarissa Patterson – Love in Limbo; Anna Borghesi – Romper Stomper

=== Non-feature film ===
Best Documentary	Best Short Fiction Film
**Black Harvest – Robin Anderson, Bob Connolly (director)**; God's Girls: Stories From An Australian Convent – Cherie Nowlan (director); Mr Neal Is Entitled To Be An Agitator – Daryl Dellora (director); The Serpent And The Cross – Chris Hilton (director)	**Road To Alice – Stavros Efthymiou (director)**; My Tiger's Eyes – Teck Tan (director); See You Next Weekend – John Irwin (director); The Art Of Drowning – Jaems Grant (director)
Best Short Animation	Outstanding Achievement in a Non-Feature Film
**Shelf Life – Andrew Horne (director)**; Secrets Of The City – Cathy Linsley (director); The Amphibian – Sina Azad, Anthony Lucas (director); The Descent – Andrew Schult (director)	**Skye Wansey (acting) – He & She**; Jackie Farkas (cinematography and direction) – Amelia Rose Towers

=== Additional awards ===
Raymond Longford Award	Byron Kennedy Award
**Lee Robinson**	**Robin Anderson, Bob Connolly**
Best Foreign Film	Young Actors Award
**Truly, Madly, Deeply – Robert Cooper**; Delicatessen – Claudie Ossard; The Commitments – Roger Randall-Cutler, Lynda Myles; Thelma & Louise – Ridley Scott, Mimi Polk	**Alexander Outhred – Hammers Over The Anvil**

=== Television ===
Best Episode in a Television Drama Series or Serial	Best Television Mini Series or Telefeature
**Phoenix, Season 1 - Episode 13, 'Hard Ball' (ABC) – Bill Hughes**; Police Rescue, Season 2 - Episode 2, 'Off The Track' (ABC) – Sandra Levy, John Edwards; Embassy, Season 3 - Episode 10, 'Crisis Of Confidence' (ABC) – Mark Callan; Phoenix, Season 1 - Episode 8, 'Fond Memories' (ABC) – Bill Hughes	**Brides of Christ (ABC) – Sue Masters**; Clowning Around (ABC) – Paul D. Barron, Antonia Barnard; Six Pack - 'Piccolo Mondo' (SBS) – Bob Weis; The Girl From Tomorrow: Tomorrow's End (Nine Network) – Noel Price
Best Performance by an Actor in a Leading Role in a Television Drama	Best Performance by an Actress in a Leading Role in a Television Drama
**Gary Sweet – Police Rescue, Season 2 - Episode 2, 'Off The Track' (ABC)**; Alan Fletcher – Embassy, Season 3 - Episode 12, 'Hostage' (ABC); Sean Scully – Phoenix, Season 1 - Episode 10, 'Blessed Are The Peacemakers' (ABC); Marshall Napier – Police Rescue, Season 2 - Episode 5, 'Judgement Day' (ABC)	**Lisa Hensley – Brides of Christ (ABC)**; Leverne McDonnell – Phoenix, Season 1 - Episode 8, 'Fond Memories' (ABC); Lenita Vangellis – Six Pack - 'Loulla' (SBS); Sandy Gore – Brides of Christ (ABC)
Best Achievement in Direction in a Television Drama	Best Screenplay in a Television Drama
**Ken Cameron – Brides of Christ (ABC)**; Geoffrey Nottage – Police Rescue, Season 2 - Episode 2, 'Off The Track' (ABC); Kate Woods – Phoenix, Season 1 - Episode 8, 'Fond Memories' (ABC); Michael Carson – Phoenix, Season 1 - Episode 13, 'Hard Ball' (ABC)	**John Alsop, Sue Smith – Brides of Christ (ABC)**; Cliff Green – Phoenix, Season 1 - Episode 8, 'Fond Memories' (ABC); Alison Nisselle – Phoenix, Season 1 - Episode 13, 'Hard Ball' (ABC); Andrew Bovell – Six Pack - 'Piccolo Mondo' (SBS)
Best Children's Television Drama	Best Television Documentary
**Lift Off, Season 1 - Episode 15/16, 'Something Tells Me' (ABC) – Patricia Edgar**; Johnson and Friends, Season 2 - Episode 26, 'Buried Treasure' (ABC) – Ron Saunders; The Miraculous Mellops – Posie Graeme-Evans; Lift Off, Season 1 - Episode 1/2, 'A Load Of Old Rubbish' (ABC) – Patricia Edgar	**Cop It Sweet (ABC) – Jennifer Brockie**; Admission Impossible (ABC) – Chris Oliver; Driving With Richard (SBS) – Andrew Wiseman; Riding The Tiger - Episode 3, 'The New Order' (ABC) – Christine Olsen
