= 2004 Australian Film Institute Awards =

Australian film and TV awards ceremony

46th Australian Film Institute Awards
- Date: 29 October 2004
- Site: Regent Theatre, Melbourne

Highlights
- Best Film: Somersault
- Best Direction: Cate Shortland; Somersault
- Best Actor: Sam Worthington; Somersault
- Best Actress: Abbie Cornish; Somersault
- Supporting Actor: Erik Thomson; Somersault
- Supporting Actress: Lynette Curran; Somersault
- Most awards: Feature film: Somersault (13)
- Most nominations: Feature film: Somersault (15); Television: Marking Time (10)

Television coverage
- Network: ABC

The 46th Annual Australian Film Institute Awards (generally known as AFI Awards), were a series of awards presented by the Australian Film Institute (AFI). The awards celebrated the best in Australian feature film, television, documentary and short film productions of 2004. The event was held at the Regent Theatre, Melbourne, on 29 October 2004 and a highlights program televised on ABC two days later on Sunday evening.

== Winners and nominees ==
The nominations were announced on 1 October 2004. Leading the feature film nominees was Somersault with 15 nominations in 13 categories. Marking Time, a miniseries inspired by the real-life experiences of Afghan refugees and their hosts in a rural town gained the most television nominations with 10, followed by sitcom Kath & Kim with 7 nominations.

Cate Shortland's debut feature Somersault, about a teenage girl learning some hard lessons about love in Jindabyne took 13 awards, winning in every category, including best film and beating the previous record of eight wins shared by Lantana in 2001 and Newsfront in 1978. In the television category the ABC miniseries Marking Time won seven awards out of its 10 nominations, including best miniseries, best direction, best screenplay, and best leading and supporting actor and actress.

=== Feature Film ===
Best Film	Best Direction
Somersault – Anthony Anderson; Love's Brother – Jane Scott, Sarah Radclyffe; The Old Man Who Read Love Stories – Julie Ryan and Michelle de Broca; Tom White – Alkinos Tsilimidos, Daniel Scharf	Cate Shortland – Somersault; Jan Sardi – Love's Brother; Khoa Do – The Finished People; Alkinos Tsilimidos – Tom White
Best Original Screenplay	
Somersault – Cate Shortland; Love's Brother – Jan Sardi; The Finished People – Khoa Do, Rodney Anderson, Joe Le and Jason McGoldrick; Tom White – Alkinos Tsilimidos	
Best Lead Actor	Best Lead Actress
Sam Worthington – Somersault; Dan Spielman – One Perfect Day; Kevin Harrington – The Honourable Wally Norman; Colin Friels – Tom White	Abbie Cornish – Somersault; Olivia Pigeot – A Cold Summer; Leeanna Walsman – One Perfect Day; Chloe Maxwell – Under The Radar
Best Supporting Actor	Best Supporting Actress
Erik Thomson – Somersault; Nathaniel Dean – Somersault; Hugo Weaving – The Old Man Who Read Love Stories; Dan Spielman – Tom White	Lynette Curran – Somersault; Hollie Andrew – Somersault; Loene Carmen – Tom White; Rachael Blake – Tom White
Best Cinematography	Best Editing
Somersault – Robert Humphreys ACS; Love's Brother – Andrew Lesnie; One Perfect Day – Gary Ravenscroft; Tom White – Toby Oliver	Somersault – Scott Gray; One Perfect Day – Gary Woodyard; The Old Man Who Read Love Stories – Tania Nehme; Tom White – Ken Sallows ASE
Best Original Music Score	Best Sound
Somersault – Decoder Ring; One Perfect Day – David Hobson; The Old Man Who Read Love Stories – Graham Tardif; Thunderstruck – David Thrussell and François Tétaz	Somersault – Mark Blackwell, Peter Smith and Sam Petty; One Perfect Day – Glenn Newnham, Jack McKerrow and Paul Pirola; Thunderstruck – Peter Smith, Peter Townend and Wayne Pashley; Tom White – James Currie, Michael Bakaloff, Peter Walker and Tristan Meredith
Best Production Design	Best Costume Design
Somersault – Melinda Doring; Love's Brother – Paul Heath; One Perfect Day – MacGregor Knox, Patrick Bennet and Joseph Kiely; Tom White – Dan Potra	Somersault – Emily Seresin; Love's Brother – Anna Borghesi; One Perfect Day – Katie Graham; Tom White – Jill Johanson

=== Television ===
Best Drama Series	Best Comedy Series
Stingers: Series 8 (Nine Network) – Roger Le Mesurier, Roger Simpson and John Wild; McLeod's Daughters: Series 3 (Nine Network) – Susan Bower and Posie Graeme-Evans; MDA: Series 3 (ABC) – Denny Lawrence; White Collar Blue: Series 2 (Network Ten) – Steve Knapman and Kris Wyld	Double the Fist (ABC) – Megan Harding; Kath & Kim: Series 3 (ABC) – Gina Riley, Mark Ruse and Jane Turner; Skithouse (Network Ten) – Craig Campbell, Jodie Crawford-Fish and Rove McManus; Stories from the Golf (SBS) – Robyn Butler and Wayne Hope
Best Telefeature or Mini Series	Best Light Entertainment Series
Marking Time (ABC) – John Edwards; Go Big (Foxtel / Network Ten) – Ellie Beaumont, Rosemary Blight and Michael Miller; Small Claims (Network Ten) – Rosemary Blight, Kylie du Fresne, Ben Grant; The Brush Off (Seven Network) – Huntaway Films and Ruby Entertainment	Enough Rope With Andrew Denton: Series 2 (ABC) – Andrew Denton and Anita Jacoby; Mondo Thingo (ABC) – Anna Bateman, Jennifer Collins and Kath Earle; Strictly Dancing: Season 1 (ABC) – Paul Melville and Steve Rothwell; The Glass House: Season 4 (ABC) – Ted Robinson
Best Lead Actor	Best Lead Actress
Abe Forsythe – Marking Time (ABC); Sam Neill – Jessica (Network Ten); Geoff Morrell – Marking Time (ABC); David Wenham – The Brush Off (Seven Network)	Bojana Novakovic – Marking Time (ABC); Gina Riley – Kath & Kim: Series 3 (ABC); Jane Turner – Kath & Kim: Series 3 (ABC); Claudia Karvan – Small Claims (Network Ten)
Best Guest or Supporting Actor	Best Guest or Supporting Actress
Matthew Le Nevez – Marking Time (ABC); Ray Barrett – All Saints: Series 7, Episode 26: "Falling From Grace" (Seven Network); Glenn Robbins – Kath & Kim: Series 3 (ABC); Lech Mackiewicz – Marking Time (ABC)	Katie Wall – Marking Time (ABC); Magda Szubanski – Kath & Kim: Series 3 (ABC); Abbie Cornish – Marking Time (ABC); Jacinta Stapleton – Stingers: Series 8, Episode 8: "Break and Enter" (Nine Network)
Best Direction	Best Screenplay
Cherie Nowlan – Marking Time (ABC); Chris Martin-Jones – All Saints: Series 7, Episode 26: "Falling From Grace" (Seven Network); Grant Brown – Stingers: Series 8, Episode 8: "Break and Enter" (Nine Network); Sam Neill – The Brush Off (Seven Network)	John Doyle – Marking Time (ABC); Gina Riley and Jane Turner – Kath & Kim: Series 2, Episode 8: "The Hideous Truth" (ABC); Matt Ford – Stingers: Series 8, Episode 8: "Break and Enter" (Nine Network); John Clarke – The Brush Off (Seven Network)
Best Children's Television Drama	Outstanding Achievement in Television Screen Craft
Wicked Science: Series 1 (Network Ten) – Daniel Scharf and Jonathan M. Shiff; Fergus McPhail (Network Ten) – Ewan Burnett and Alan Hardy; Noah & Saskia (ABC) – Patricia Edgar; Out There: Series 2 (ABC) – Michael Bourchier	Kitty Stuckey – Kath & Kim: Series 3 (ABC) for costume design; Paul Grabowsky – Jessica (Network Ten) for music composition; Paul Nichola – Noah & Saskia (ABC) for animation and digital effects; Barry Lanfranchi – Wicked Science: Series 1 (Network Ten) for digital effects

=== Non-feature film ===
Best Documentary	Best Direction in a Documentary
The President Versus David Hicks – Curtis Levy; Helen’s War: Portrait of a Dissident – Sonja Armstrong and Anne Pick; Lonely Boy Richard – Denise Haslem and Rose Hesp; The Men Who Would Conquer China – Nick Torrens	Anna Broinowski – Helen's War: Portrait of a Dissident; Faramarz K. Rahber – Fahimeh’s Story; Cathy Henkel – The Man Who Stole My Mother’s Face; Bentley Dean and Curtis Levy – The President Versus David Hicks
Best Short Fiction Film	Best Short Animation
Lennie Cahill Shoots Through – Paul Oliver; Floodhouse – Miro Bilbrough; So Close To Home – Jessica Hobbs; The Scree – Paul McDermott	Birthday Boy – Sejong Park; Footnote – Pia Borg; It’s Like That – Southern Ladies Animation Group (S.L.A.G.); Lucky For Some – Robert Stephenson
Best Screenplay in a Short Film	Best Cinematography in a Non-Feature Film
Danielle Maclean – Queen of Hearts; Sejong Park – Birthday Boy; Miro Bilbrough – Floodhouse; Madeleine Blackwell – So Close To Home	Ian Batt – Inside Australia; Kim Batterham – Floodhouse; Tim Hudson – My Sister; David Parer – Platypus: World’s Strangest Animal
Best Editing in a Non-Feature Film	Best Sound in a Non-Feature Film
Jane St Vincent-Welch – The Men Who Would Conquer China; Janet Merewether – Palermo: 'History' Standing Still; Denise Haratzis – So Close To Home; David Cole – Truckies Don’t Eat Quiche	David Bridie, John Patterson and Tony Vaccher – Land of the Morning Star; Andrew Duffield, Liam Egan and Phil Judd – Big Men; Bigger Dreams: Australian Wrestlers; James Lee, Chris McKeith and Megan Wedge – Birthday Boy; Andrew Plain and Liam Price – Good Luck Jeffrey Brown

=== Additional Awards ===
Young Actor's Award	Best Foreign Film
Natasha Wanganeen – Jessica; Richard Wilson – Out There: Series 2; Sarah Vongmany – The Finished People; Jarryd Jinks – Tom White	The Lord of the Rings: The Return of the King – Peter Jackson, Barrie M. Osborne and Fran Walsh; Eternal Sunshine of the Spotless Mind – Anthony Bregman and Steve Golin; Lost in Translation – Sofia Coppola and Ross Katz; Mystic River – Robert Lorenz, Judie G. Hoyt and Clint Eastwood

=== Individual Awards ===
Award	Winner
Byron Kennedy Award	John Clarke
Raymond Longford Award	Patricia Lovell
Global Achievement Award	Naomi Watts

== Multiple nominations ==
The following films received multiple nominations.

- 15 nominations: Somersault
- 12 nominations: Tom White
- 8 nominations: One Perfect Day

== See also ==
- AACTA Awards
