= Rats in the Ranks =

1996 documentary film

- Directed by: Robin Anderson; Bob Connolly
- Written by: Robin Anderson; Bob Connolly
- Produced by: Robin Anderson; Bob Connolly
- Starring: Larry Hand; Nick Origlass; Kate Butler; Kath Hacking
- Cinematography: Bob Connolly
- Edited by: Ray Thomas
- Production companies: Arundel Productions, Film Australia
- Release date: 5 September 1996 (AUS)
- Running time: 93 min.
- Country: Australia
- Language: English

Rats in the Ranks is an Australian feature-length documentary film released in 1996, made by Bob Connolly and Robin Anderson. The film detailed the last weeks of the 1994 Leichhardt Council mayoral elections, in which Larry Hands was the incumbent seeking to win another term in office.

== Synopsis ==
The film was a fly-on-the-wall documentary about the lead-up to a mayoral election in the local government area of Leichardt, an inner-western suburb of Sydney, New South Wales. The film opens with a caucus meeting of the Australian Labor Party (ALP) three weeks before the mayoral election, at which many members express dislike for each other, and continues throughout the campaign. Larry Hand, who had served as mayor for three years, allowed filming of his phone calls in an attempt to garner support to serve for a fourth year.

It has been noted that Anthony Albanese, then-assistant general secretary of the NSW Labor Party, proposed to the Labor caucus at the Leichhardt Council that they should solve their factional dispute over who should run for mayor by pulling a name out of a hat; however, he does not appear in the film, by his own choice at the time.

== Production ==
Filmmaker Bob Connolly approached the government funding body Film Australia with his idea for the film, as he had a "gut feeling... that something interesting would very likely happen". Chris Oliver, then an executive producer at the organisation, was sceptical at first, but after seeing footage of the serving mayor Larry Hand, thought that his "classic laconic larrikin" character may have on-screen appeal, and approved the funding under Film Australia's National Interest program.

The filmmakers, Connolly and Robin Anderson, who were life as well as professional partners, were responsible for directing, producing, and filming Rats in the Ranks. They were allowed access to the innermost meetings of participants, including Hand and his Labor Party opponents. Connolly, who has remained friends with Larry Hand, said decades later that the filmmakers became a kind of "sounding board" for Hand, on camera. Hand was

Filming took 10 months in the lead-up to a mayoral election, starting in December 1993, in which the filmmakers used 60,000 ft (18,000 m) of 16mm film. The film was edited by Ray Thomas and Connolly. It was a A Film Australia and Arundel Films production.

On the 30th anniversary of the film's release, in 2026, Connolly said that he had "huge regrets" about making the film, because the Australian press only basically conveyed "we loved the film but we hated the councillors who are all low lives", and that "some of the left were furious" because they saw the film as "sending up a progressive council".

== Release ==
Rats in the Ranks screened at over 40 international film festivals.

After being released in Australian cinemas on 5 September 1996, it played at the former Valhalla Cinema in Glebe for five months. It opened at Film Forum, a cinema in Manhattan, New York, on 26 February 1997.

As of 2026, the film is still available to rent on streaming services and from the National Film and Sound Archive.

== Reception ==
=== Box office ===
The film earned $120,000 (A$200,000) at the box-office, a record for a documentary feature.

=== Critical reception ===
Janet Maslin wrote in The New York Times: "The nicely barbed Australian documentary Rats in the Ranks may be local in outlook, but it illustrates a universal political maxim: watch your back". She wrote that the film shows "the dauntless energy and sheer Shakespearean conniving it takes to stay afloat" in the "shark-infested waters" of local politics.

Rats in the Ranks retains its reputation as a critical masterpiece. After being reissued by the NFSA and released on DocPlay in May 2024, Craig Mathieson of The Age gave the film 4.5 out of 5 stars, calling it an "Australian classic" and writing "the annual mayoral election among councillors in the Sydney suburb of Leichhardt becomes an absurdist comedy as independent incumbent Larry Hand masterfully exploits dissent within the Labor ranks to pursue an unlikely third term. Shout-out to Karl Marx, whose line about history as tragedy and then farce really resonates here".

== Awards ==
Rats in the Ranks was screened at more than forty film festivals and won multiple awards, including the Silver Plaque for Social/Political Documentary at the Chicago International Film Festival in 1996, the 1996 Critics Choice Award for Documentary at the Sydney Film Festival, and the Logie Award for most outstanding documentary series/program in 1998.

Ray Thomas, who went on to edit many Australian documentaries, including Molly & Mobarak (2003), Mrs Carey's Concert (2011), and When the Camera Stopped Rolling (2021), won an AFI Award for Best Achievement in Editing in a Non-Feature Film for Rats in the Ranks.

== See also ==
- Cinema of Australia
- Australian films of 1996
- Logie Awards of 1998
