= Los Angeles Film Critics Association Award for Best Documentary Film =

Annual US film award

The Los Angeles Film Critics Association Award for Best Documentary Feature is one of the annual awards given by the Los Angeles Film Critics Association.

== History ==
This award had been given since 1988. The award is also known as Best Documentary/Non-Fiction film.

== Winners ==
=== 1980s ===
Year	Winner	Director(s)
1988	Hôtel Terminus: The Life and Times of Klaus Barbie	Marcel Ophuls
1989	Roger & Me	Michael Moore

== 1990s ==
Year	Winner	Director(s)
1990	Paris Is Burning	Jennie Livingston
1991	American Dream	Barbara Kopple
1992	Black Harvest	Robin Anderson and Bob Connolly
1993	It's All True	Bill Krohn, Myron Meisel and Orson Welles
1994	Hoop Dreams	Steve James
1995	Crumb	Terry Zwigoff
1996	When We Were Kings	Leon Gast
1997	Riding the Rails	Lexy Lovell and Michael Uys
1998	The Farm: Angola, USA	Liz Garbus and Wilbert Rideau
1999	Buena Vista Social Club	Wim Wenders

== 2000s ==
Year	Winner	Director(s)
2000	Dark Days	Marc Singer
2001	The Gleaners and I (Les glaneurs et la glaneuse)	Agnès Varda
2002	The Cockettes	Bill Weber and David Weissman
2003	The Fog of War	Errol Morris
2004	Born into Brothels	Zana Briski and Ross Kauffman
2005	Grizzly Man	Werner Herzog
2006	An Inconvenient Truth	Davis Guggenheim
2007	No End in Sight	Charles Ferguson
2008	Man on Wire	James Marsh
2009	The Beaches of Agnès	Agnès Varda
2009	The Cove	Louie Psihoyos

== 2010s ==
Year	Winner	Director(s)
2010	Last Train Home	Lixin Fan
2011	Cave of Forgotten Dreams	Werner Herzog
2012	The Gatekeepers	Dror Moreh
2013	Stories We Tell	Sarah Polley
2014	Citizenfour	Laura Poitras
2015	Amy	Asif Kapadia
2016	I Am Not Your Negro	Raoul Peck
2017	Faces Places (Visages Villages)	Agnès Varda and JR
2018	Shirkers	Sandi Tan
2019	American Factory	Steven Bognar and Julia Reichert

== 2020s ==
Year	Winner	Director(s)
2020	Time	Garrett Bradley
2021	Summer of Soul	Questlove
2022	All the Beauty and the Bloodshed	Laura Poitras
2023	Menus-Plaisirs – Les Troisgros	Frederick Wiseman
2024	No Other Land	Basel Adra, Hamdan Ballal, Yuval Abraham, Rachel Szor
2025	My Undesirable Friends: Part I – Last Air in Moscow	Julia Loktev

== Multiple wins ==
- Agnes Varda - 3 (one co-win)
- Werner Herzog - 2
- Laura Poitras - 2

== See also ==
- Academy Award for Best Documentary Feature
