= Robin Anderson =

Robin Anderson may refer to:

- Robin Anderson (filmmaker)
- Robin Anderson (tennis)
