= First Contact (1983 film) =

- Directed by: Robin Anderson; Bob Connolly
- Produced by: Robin Anderson; Bob Connolly
- Narrated by: Richard Oxenburgh
- Cinematography: Dennis O'Rourke; Tony Wilson
- Edited by: Martyn Down; Stewart Young
- Production company: Arundel Productions
- Distributed by: Ronin Films
- Release date: 7 December 1983
- Running time: 58 minutes
- Country: Australia
- Language: English

First Contact is a 1983 Australian documentary film by Bob Connolly and Robin Anderson which recounts the incursion of gold-prospecting Australians into the unexplored interior highlands of New Guinea in 1930, then inhabited by a prosperous native population numbering in the region of one million. It is based on the book of the same name by the same authors. Inhabitants of the region and surviving members of the Leahy brothers' gold prospecting party recount their astonishment at this unforeseen meeting. The film includes both moving and still pictures taken by Michael Leahy, leader of the party, and contemporary footage of the island's terrain.

The film was nominated for an Academy Award for Best Documentary Feature. It won Best Feature Documentary at the 1983 Australian Film Institute Awards.

== The Highlands Trilogy ==
First Contact is the first documentary in what later became known as The Highlands Trilogy. The other two films are Joe Leahy's Neighbours (1989) and Black Harvest (1992). These three films, between them, have won some thirty major awards, including each film winning both the Grand Prix at the Cinéma du Réel festival in Paris and AFI Award for Best Documentary.

Joe Leahy's Neighbours and Black Harvest pick up the Leahy story started in First Contact but in the next generation with Michael Leahy's mixed-race son, Joe Leahy, and his family. These two films document Joe Leahy's life as owner and manager of two coffee plantations on land acquired in controversial circumstances from the Ganiga tribe. Much of the drama in the two films stems from the implications and expectations of these two plantations, that is, from conflicts about ownership both within the Ganiga people and between the Ganiga and Leahy. The films chart a society in transition from a tribal life to a Western capitalist one.

== Reception ==
In Cinema Papers, Barbara Alysen called First Contact "an entertaining film about a series of historic meetings - selective, as most accounts are, that is as much drama as conventional documentary".

== Box office ==
First Contact grossed $120,000 at the box office in Australia.

== See also ==
- Cinema of Australia
