= Black Harvest =

Black Harvest may refer to:

- Black Harvest (1993 film), a Danish drama film
- Black Harvest (1992 film), an Australian-Papua New Guinea documentary film
