= Natural History Unit =

Natural History Unit may refer to:

- The BBC Natural History Unit
- The former ABC Natural History Unit
