= 50 Years Of Silence =

1994 documentary film

- Directed by: Ned Lander with Carol Ruff and James Bradley
- Written by: Carol Sklan; Jan Ruff-O'Herne
- Produced by: Carol Ruff; Ned Lander
- Cinematography: John Whitteron; Joel Peterson
- Edited by: James Bradley
- Release date: 1994
- Running time: 57 minutes
- Country: Australia
- Language: English

50 Years Of Silence is a 1994 documentary film that tells the story of Japanese war rape victim Jan Ruff-O'Herne.

== Reception ==
In the Sunday Telegraph Sean Day-Lewis says Ruff-O'Herne "courageously and poignantly tells of her months providing as little comfort as she could after being forced to serve in a Japanese army brothel.." Martin Massingberd wrote in the Daily Telegraph that it "was an inspiring film about a remarkable woman, whose undimmed warmth and sympath shone through her appalling ordeal as a triumph of the human spirit." Michael Hutak of the Sydney Morning Herald writes "This film stands as a lasting testimony of those atrocities and a plea for victims to break the cycle of guilt and speak out." Robin Oliver, also of the Sydney Morning Herald, states "The shattering contents of this documentary overwhelm the viewer and it is difficult to look beyond the story of Jan Ruff-O'Herne and consider the film itself, which is often disjointed and poorly edited."

== Awards ==
- 1994 Australian Film Institute Awards
  - Best Documentary - Ned Lander, Carol Ruff and James Bradley - won
