= Painting the Town (film) =

1987 documentary film

- Directed by: Trevor Graham
- Written by: Charles Merewether; Sharon Connolly; Trevor Graham
- Produced by: Trevor Graham; Ned Lander
- Narrated by: Max Gillies
- Cinematography: John Whitteron; Mandy Walker
- Edited by: Tony Stephens
- Music by: Joe Camilleri; Paul Grabowsky
- Release date: 1987
- Running time: 59 minutes
- Country: Australia
- Language: English

Painting the Town is a 1987 Australian documentary film, created by Trevor Graham, looking at Jewish artist Yosl Bergner's time in Australia.

== Reception ==
Jim Schembri of the Age states "as far as films about artists and their work go this film has a rare quality; it is entertaining." Diana Simmonds wrote in the Sydney Morning Herald that the filmmakers "put together a film that's as racy as a fiction drama, as droll (courtesy of their witty and articulate subject) as a comedy play, and as informative and visionary as many programs twice the length."

== Awards ==
- 1987 Australian Film Institute Awards
  - Best Documentary - Trevor Graham - won
