= The Diplomat (2000 film) =

2000 documentary film

- Directed by: Tom Zubrycki
- Written by: Wilson da Silva
- Produced by: Sally Browning; Wilson da Silva
- Cinematography: Robert Humphreys; Jo Parker; Joel Peterson; Tom Zubrycki
- Edited by: Ray Thomas
- Music by: Jan Preston
- Release date: 2000
- Running time: 81 minutes
- Country: Australia
- Language: English

The Diplomat is a 2000 Australian documentary film, directed by Tom Zubrycki, following East Timorese independence leader Jose Ramos Horta.

== Reception ==
David Stratton wrote in Variety:

Patient, fly-on-the-wall approach to filmmaking pays off, thanks in large part to the charisma of its subject and the unforeseen events that provide an upbeat ending. Zubrycki makes interesting use of newsreel footage, which is shown in black-and-white with slabs of red inserted. At 81 minutes, film is almost too short for its powerful and involving subject matter."

Phillip Adams wrote The Weekend Australian: "its portrait of a bloke whose refusal to surrender was, and remains, astonishing." Philippa Hawker of The Age wrote "The Diplomat has made the most of its timeliness: it's an engrossing, powerful document of a subject, a process and an extraordinary political turn of events."

== Awards ==
- 2000 Australian Film Institute Awards
  - Best Documentary - Sally Browning, Wilson da Silva - won
  - Best Direction in a Documentary - Tom Zubrycki - won
