= Kemira: Diary of a Strike =

1984 documentary film

- Directed by: Tom Zubrycki
- Produced by: Tom Zubrycki
- Music by: Elizabeth Drake
- Release date: 1984
- Running time: 62 minutes
- Country: Australia
- Language: English

Kemira: Diary of a Strike is a 1984 Australian documentary film, created by Tom Zubrycki, covering a miner's strike in Wollongong.

== Reception ==
Anna-Maria Dell'oso of The Sydney Morning Herald gave it a mixed review. She states "In terms of insight, is not the greatest documentary ever made. It provokes audience response because it shows people fighting injustice with the exhilarating energy of co-operation and vision that a strike can foster and it gives a hint of Wollongong's strong working-class social networks." She finishes "Worth seeing." Also in The Sydney Morning Herald Bronwyn Watson calls it "One of the best Australian-made documentaries" and says it is "a very cleverly made film. It mixes interviews, black and white footage from the 1949 coal strikes, TV news reports and the ludicrous We Love Wollongong commercials. But its technical expertise never becomes intrusive."

== Awards ==
- 1984 Australian Film Institute Awards
  - Best Documentary - Tom Zubrycki - won
