= Joe Leahy's Neighbours =

1989 documentary film

- Directed by: Robin Anderson; Bob Connolly
- Written by: Robin Anderson; Bob Connolly
- Produced by: Robin Anderson; Bob Connolly
- Starring: Joe Leahy
- Cinematography: Bob Connolly
- Edited by: Ray Thomas; Bob Connolly
- Release date: 1989
- Running time: 90 minutes
- Country: Australia
- Language: English

Joe Leahy's Neighbours is a 1989 Australian documentary film, created by Robin Anderson and Bob Connolly, looking at Papua New Guinean business man Joe Leahy and relationship to those around him. It is some ways a sequel to First Contact.

== Reception ==
Neil Jillet of the Age says "Documentary is a hopelessly inadequate word to describe 'Joe Leahy's Neighbours'. This wonderful film has the dramatic strength of a first-class feature. It is an anthropological tragi-comedy full of conflicts among fascinating characters. It is also a psychological thriller about collectivism v. capitalism, about “primitive” ways v. “sophisticated” ones, that regularly seem about to erupt into violence, possibly murder." The Sun-Heralds Rob Lowing finishes "the slyly witty final images are a summary in themselves and a memorable finishing touch to a film which is both thought provoking and entertaining." Writing in the Sydney Morning Herald' David Stratton says "This beautifully-made 90-minute documentary is an invaluable insight into life in PNG, and a perceptive study of a strange king of colonialism".

== Awards ==
- 1989 Australian Film Institute Awards
  - Best Documentary - Robin Anderson, Bob Connolly - won
  - Best Achievement in Sound in a Non-Feature Film - Robin Anderson - nominated
