= Six Pack (TV series) =

- Genre: Anthology
- Composers: Tassos Ioannides; Paul Schutze
- Country of origin: Australia
- Original language: English
- No. of episodes: 6

Production
- Producer: Bob Weis
- Cinematography: Steve Arnold; Jeffrey Malouf; Lorraine Stacey
- Editors: Denise Haslem; James Manche
- Running time: 55 minutes
- Production company: Generation Films

Original release
- Network: SBS-TV
- Release: 27 April – 1 June 1992

Six Pack is an Australian television anthology series that was originally broadcast on SBS-TV from 27 April 1992. The series contains six hour-long dramas.

== Production ==
Six Pack is an anthology series produced by Bob Weis for Generation Films and SBS. At the time, it marked the first locally-made drama for SBS since the 1987 miniseries Always Afternoon. The series is made up of six self-contained stories. Garry Shelley of TV Week reported that the stories would be made up of comedy, drama, with some being contemporary, film noir, and nostalgic Fifties. A spokesperson for SBS told Shelley: "SBS has a history of quality drama and we're proud to be showing new locally-made drama. With the six episodes is a story and a character which will appeal to every Australian."

== Cast ==
- Angie Millikin ("Mimi Goes to the Analyst")
- Sandy Gore ("Mimi Goes to the Analyst")
- Josephine Mitchell ("Mimi Goes to the Analyst")
- Colin Moody ("Mimi Goes to the Analyst")
- Simon Burke ("Loveless")
- Ivar Kants ("Loveless")
- Steve Bastoni ("Loveless")
- Denise Scott ("Piccolo Mondo")
- Peta Toppano ("Piccolo Mondo")
- Victoria Longley ("Piccolo Mondo")
- Angelo D'Angelo ("Piccolo Mondo")
- John Bluthal ("Death Duties")
- Lloyd Morris ("Death Duties")
- Alistair Duncan ("Death Duties")
- Lenita Vangellis ("Loulla")
- George Zogopoulas ("Loulla")
- Arianthe Galani ("Loulla")
- Geraldine Turner ("That Man's Father")
- Martin Jacobs ("That Man's Father")
- Ben Oxenbould ("That Man's Father")

== Episodes ==
| No. | Title | Directed by | Written by | Original release date |
|---|---|---|---|---|
| 1 | "Mimi Goes to the Analyst" | Megan Simpson | Joanna Murray-Smith | 27 April 1992 |
| 2 | "Loveless" | Rodney Fisher | Tony Ayres | 4 May 1992 |
| 3 | "Piccolo Mondo" | Sue Brooks | Andrew Bovell | 11 May 1992 |
| 4 | "Death Duties" | Karin Altmann | Ron Elisha | 18 May 1992 |
| 5 | "Loulla" | Kay Pavlou | Tony Maniaty | 25 May 1992 |
| 6 | "That Man's Father" | Di Drew | Christopher Lee | 1 June 1992 |

== Reception ==
The series received three nominations at the 1992 Australian Film Institute Awards. "Piccolo Mondo" was nominated for Best Television Mini Series or Telefeature and its writer Andrew Bovell earned a nomination for Best Screenplay in a Television Drama. For her performance in "Loulla", Lenita Vangellis was nominated for Best Actress in a Leading Role in a Television Drama. At the 1992 AWGIE Awards, Ron Elisha won the Television – Original category for "Death Duties", sharing the award with John Alsop and Sue Smith for Brides of Christ.
