= Chile: When Will It End? =

1986 film

- Produced by: David Bradbury
- Narrated by: David Bradbury
- Cinematography: David Knaus
- Music by: Inti-Illimani
- Production company: Frontline Films
- Release date: 1986
- Running time: 57 minutes
- Country: Australia
- Language: Spanish

Chile: When Will It End? (Spanish: Chile: Hasta Cuando?) is a 1986 Australian documentary film produced by David Bradbury. The film portrays the dictatorship of General Augusto Pinochet. It was nominated for an Academy Award for Best Documentary Feature.
