= The Dragons of Galapagos =

1998 documentary film

- Directed by: David Parer and Elizabeth Parer-Cook
- Written by: David Attenborough and Nicolas Noxon
- Produced by: David Parer
- Starring: David Attenborough and Nicolas Noxon
- Cinematography: David Parer
- Edited by: Paul Cantwell and Beth Spiegel
- Music by: Martin Friedel
- Release date: 1998
- Running time: 55 minutes
- Country: Australia
- Language: English

The Dragons of Galapagos is a 1998 wildlife documentary film created by David Parer and Elizabeth Parer-Cook. It looks at the life on the Galapagos Islands. The couple spend two years living in a tent on the island of Fernandina to record the animals, with Parer working the camera and Parer-Cook recording the sound. It was produced by the BBC, National Geographic and the ABC and was narrated by David Attenborough.

== Awards ==
- 1998 Australian Film Institute Awards
  - Best Documentary - David Parer and Elizabeth Parer-Cook - won
  - Best Achievement in Cinematography in a Non-Feature Film - David Parer - won
