= Raul The Terrible =

2006 documentary film

- Directed by: David Bradbury
- Written by: Carlos Alperin
- Produced by: Carlos Alperin
- Cinematography: David Bradbury
- Edited by: Stewart Young
- Release date: 2006
- Running time: 79 minutes
- Country: Australia
- Language: English

Raul The Terrible is a 2006 Australian documentary film created by David Bradbury. It is a study of Raúl Castells. Bradbury and his team had close access to him for a period of three months and then filmed for a second period when Castells was engaged in a hunger strike.

It was Ettinger-Epstein debut film and stemmed from a chance meeting at the Matthew Talbot refuge in Woolloomooloo after which she saw his photographs.

== Reception ==
Doug Anderson of the Sydney Morning Herald wrote "Not terribly well compiled but worthy as all get-out" Newcastle Herald's Kylie Cooper says in her capsule review "this warts-and-all portrait of a man driven to change his world, provides an insight into the politics of poverty in twenty-first century Argentina." Also with a capsule review the Age's Paul Kalina said "Veteran Australia filmmaker David Bradbury casts a wryly humorous eye on Argentine dissident Raul Castells in this warts-and-all portrait of a flawed revolutionary and once affluent nation in economic ruins."

== Awards ==
- 2006 Australian Film Institute Awards
  - Best Direction in a Documentary - David Bradbury - won
  - Best Editing in a Non-Feature Film - Stewart Young - won
  - Best Documentary - Carlos Alperin - nominated
