= Cannibal Tours =

- Directed by: Dennis O'Rourke
- Produced by: Laurence J. Henderson; Dennis O'Rourke
- Cinematography: Dennis O'Rourke
- Edited by: Tim Litchfield
- Release date: 1988
- Running time: 70 minutes
- Country: Australia
- Language: English

Cannibal Tours is a 1988 documentary film by Australian director and cinematographer Dennis O'Rourke. While it borrows heavily from ethnographic modes of representation, the film is a biting commentary on the nature of modernity. The film is also widely celebrated for its depiction of Western touristic desires and exploitation among a "tribal" people.

The film follows a number of affluent European and American tourists and ecotourists as they travel from village to village along the middle Sepik River in Papua New Guinea. Most of the villages in the film are inhabited by the Iatmul people. (Note: The Iatmul people were initially made famous in anthropology through the ethnographic fieldwork of Margaret Mead and Gregory Bateson in the 1920s and 1930s .) The film shows the tourists driving hard bargains for local handcrafts such as woodcarvings and baskets, relentlessly taking photos of local people, handing out cigarettes, balloons, and perfume, viewing staged dance performances, and offering naive comments on native people living in harmony with nature. The film, too, tacks between the tourists and black-and-white photographs from the era of German colonialism of New Guinea (1880s–1914). With some prodding, the tourists unwittingly reveal an unattractive and pervasive ethnocentrism to O'Rourke's cameras.

The title of the film can be read in a variety of ways. At one point early in the film, a German tourist describes the bygone practice of raiding and cannibalism. He asks local men about the former practice and snaps photos of locations where local people once practised headhunting; other tourists similarly attempt to discuss the "symbolic" meaning of cannibalism. In the narrative of the film, however, the tourists are portrayed as the real cannibals who consume the world through their arrogance, acquisitiveness, primitivist fantasies of indigenous people, and photography (the cameras in the film double for the guns of past colonial administrators). Generally the film presents the tourists as driven by truly bizarre beliefs and behaviours, while the local people are represented as practical and reasonable. Thus the "natives" display the rational logic of modernity, while the Western tourists are guilty of the very irrational traits they attribute to the natives. The climax of the film is when a group of tourists, faces painted in "native fashion" by local men from one village (Tambunum), prance, dance, and assume a boxing stance to the music of Mozart.

== Sources and further reading ==
- Burns, P. and J. Lester (2005) 'Using Visual Evidence: The Case of Cannibal Tours', pp. 49–61 in B. Ritchie, P. Burns and C. Palmer (eds) Tourism Research Methods: Integrating Theory with Practice. Oxfordshire: CABI.
- Coiffier, Christian.- 199L '"Cannibal Tours,' L'envers du Decor. Mani Bilong Waitman,"Journal de la Sociéte des Oceanistes 92/93:181–187.
- Errington, Frederick, and Deborah Gewertz. 1989. "Review of Cannibal Tours." American Anthropologist 91:274–275.
- Huang, W.-J. and B. C. Lee (2010) 'The Tourist Gaze in Travel Documentaries: The Case of Cannibal Tours', Journal of Quality Assurance in Hospitality & Tourism 11(4): 239–59.
- Lutkehaus, Nancy Christine. 1989. "'Excuse Me, Everything Is Not All Right': On Ethnography, Film, and Representation: An Interview with Filmmaker Dennis O'Rourke." Cultural Anthropology 4:422–437.
- MacCannell, Dean. 1990. "Cannibal Tours." Visual Anthropology Review 6:14–23.
- O'Rourke; Dennis. 1997. "Beyond Cannibal Tours: Tourists, Modernity and 'The·Other."' In Tourism and Cultural Deve_lopment in Asia and Oceania. Shinji Yamashita, Kadir H. Din, and J. S. Eades, eds. Pp. 32–47.Bangi: Penerbit Universiti Kebangsaan Malaysia.
- Palmer, C. and J. Lester (2007) 'Stalking the Cannibals: Photographic Behaviours on the Sepik River', Tourist Studies 7(1): 83–106.
- Silverman, Eric. (1999) 'Art, Tourism and the Crafting of Identity in the Sepik River (Papua New Guinea)’, pp. 51–66 in R. Phillips and C. Steiner (eds) Unpacking Culture: Art and Commodity in Colonial and Postcolonial Worlds. Berkeley, CA: University of California Press.
- Silverman, Eric. (2003) 'High Art as Tourist Art, Tourist Art as High Art: Comparing the New Guinea Sculpture Garden at Stanford University and Sepik River Tourist Art', International Journal of Anthropology 18: 219–30. (Reprinted in Venbrux, E., P. S. Rosi and R. L. Welsch (eds) Exploring World Art. Long Grove, IL: Waveland Press, pp. 271–84).
- Silverman, E. (2004) 'Cannibalizing, Commodifying, and Creating Culture: Power and Creativity in Sepik River Tourism', pp. 339–57 in V. Lockwood (ed.) Globalization and Culture Change in the Pacific Islands. Upper Saddle River, NJ: Prentice-Hall.
- Silverman, Eric. (2013). After Cannibal Tours: Cargoism and Marginality in a Post-Touristic Sepik River Society. The Contemporary Pacific 25: 221–57.
- Silverman, Eric. (2012). From Cannibal Tours to Cargo Cult: On the Aftermath of Tourism in the Sepik River, Papua New Guinea. Tourism Studies 12: 109–30.
- Young, Katherine. 1992. "Visuality and the Category of the Other: The Cannibal Tours of Dean MacCannell and Dennis O'Rourke." Visual Anthropology Review 8:92–96.
