= Mick Leahy (explorer) =

Australian explorer and gold prospector (1901–1979)

Michael James Leahy
- Born: 26 February 1901; Toowoomba, Queensland
- Died: 7 March 1979 (aged 78); Zenag, Morobe, Papua New Guinea
- Parents: Daniel Leahy (father); Ellen Stone (mother)

Michael James Leahy MBE (26 February 1901 – 7 March 1979) was an Australian explorer and gold prospector, famed for his exploration of the Highlands area of Papua New Guinea. He photographed, filmed and published many of his explorations widely.

== Biography ==
=== Early life ===
Leahy was born in Toowoomba, Queensland, the fourth of nine children of Irish migrants Daniel Leahy, a railway guard, and his wife Ellen, née Stone. After an education at the Christian Brothers' College in Toowoomba, Leahy initially worked as a railway clerk before leaving to become a freelance timber cutter. He abandoned this in 1926 upon hearing about the Edie Creek gold strike in New Guinea. He was soon followed to New Guinea by his brothers Paddy, Jim and Danny, while another brother, Tom, remained in Toowoomba.

After suffering from an almost fatal bout of malaria upon trying to reach the gold fields, Leahy instead took a construction and labour management job.

=== Explorer ===
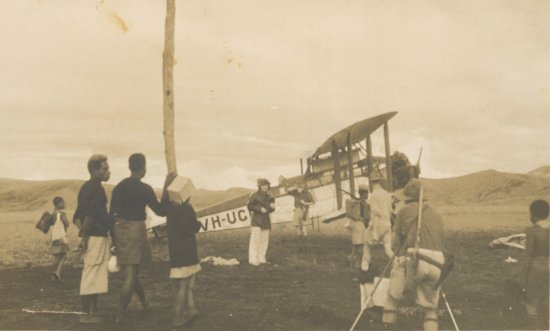
Michael Leahy filming the exploration party to the Wahgi Valley

Mick Leahy with Mick Dwyer walked across New Guinea in 1930 and disproved the prevailing opinion that the interior of the island was unpopulated. In 1931, together with his brother Patrick, he explored the Kukukuku land.

Mick and his brother Danny were leaders of the 1933 expedition into the Western Highlands. He also made two pioneering airplane flights into the western highlands, discovering the Wahgi Valley, taking thousands of photographs and movie film.

He was one of the first Europeans to reach and climb the country's second tallest mountain – Mount Giluwe (1934). However, Jack Hides had also laid claim to be the first to discover Mount Giluwe, so Leahy went to England in 1935 and forced the Royal Geographical Society to set up a hearing into the two opposing claims. The following year Leahy was awarded the Murchison Award by the Society and published his discoveries in their journal.

Leahy believed in his right to go anywhere in New Guinea, in pursuit of gold, and he was accorded the right to penetrate the Highlands by the Administration. His diaries record that he and his party were responsible for 41 deaths between 1930 and 1934. In 1936, revelations of these deaths led to an inquiry, led by ADO (Assistant District Officer) Jim Taylor. He concluded that Leahy had acted in self-defence, and viewed such deaths as inevitable if prospectors were afforded the right to explore territories beyond the control of the colonial authorities.

During the Second World War he joined the Royal Australian Air Force as a flight lieutenant and was assigned to the US chief engineer to build an airstrip in Telefomin. For his services during the war Leahy was awarded the US Medal of Freedom with bronze palm in 1948, appointed a Member of the Order of the British Empire (MBE) in 1952 and made an honorary member of the Explorers Club in 1959.

The 1983 award-winning documentary film 'First Contact' is about the exploration of the Wahgi Valley and Mount Hagen in Papua New Guinea based on much of Leahy's footage.

He died at Zenag in Morobe Province, in 1979.

== Bibliography ==
Books and papers authored or coauthored by Leahy include:

- Leahy, Michael. (1936). The Central Highlands of New Guinea. Royal Geographical Society: London. (pp. 229–262 in the Geographical Journal).
- Leahy, Michael J. (Ed: Douglas E. Jones). (1994). Explorations into Highland New Guinea, 1930-1935. Crawford House Press: Bathurst.
- Leahy, Michael J.; & Crain, Maurice. (1937). The Land That Time Forgot. Adventure and Discoveries in New Guinea. Funk & Wagnalls: New York.
