= Handmaidens and Battleaxes =

1990 documentary film

- Directed by: Rosalind Gillespie
- Written by: Rosalind Gillespie
- Produced by: Rosalind Gillespie
- Cinematography: Laurie McInnes
- Edited by: Diane Priest
- Release date: 1990
- Running time: 55 minutes
- Country: Australia
- Language: English

Handmaidens and Battleaxes is a 1990 documentary film, created by Rosalind Gillespie, about the evolving role of nurses.

== Reception ==
In Filmnews Martha Ansara says "Handmaidens and Battleaxes is one of those rare films which will actually make an impact upon public perception of an issue. The mere fact of its existence as testament is evidence of the release of the potential of nurses, so long suppressed and downgraded. The conceptual skills of female director and crew demonstrate, to me at least, that the feminist film can communicate complex ideas to a wide audience without lowering the filmic common denominator."

== Awards ==
- 1990 Australian Film Institute Awards
  - Best Documentary - Rosalind Gillespie - won
  - Best Achievement in Cinematography in a Non-Feature Film - Laurie McInnes - nominated
  - Best Achievement in Editing in a Non-Feature Film - Diane Priest - nominated
  - Best Achievement in Sound in a Non-Feature Film - Bronwyn Murphy - nominated
