= Cunnamulla (film) =

Australian film

Cunnamulla is a 2000 Australian documentary directed by Dennis O'Rourke about the town Cunnamulla in Queensland, Australia. The film was highly controversial due to its depiction of life in an Australian outback town and the techniques used to make the film.
