= Tom Zubrycki =

Australian filmmaker

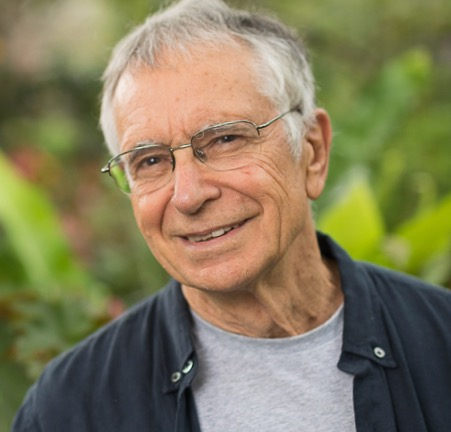
Tom Zubrycki (2021)

Tom Zubrycki (born 1946) is an Australian documentary filmmaker. He is "widely respected as one of Australia's leading documentary filmmakers", according to Jonathan Dawson. His films on social, environmental and political issues have won international prizes and have been screened around the world. He has also worked as a film lecturer and published occasional articles and papers about documentary film.

== Early life and education ==
Zubrycki emigrated with his parents from England to Canberra, Australia in late 1955. His father is Jerzy Zubrzycki (1920–2009), a university academic credited as one of the main architects of the Australian government’s policy on multiculturalism.

== Film career ==
=== 20th century ===
While studying sociology, Zubrycki became inspired by the Canadian Challenge for Change scheme, which used film and video to empower local communities. In 1974 the Whitlam Labor government funded 12 video access resource centres across Australia which were modeled on the Canadian scheme. Zubrycki eventually became involved in the development of community video in Australia. One of his projects involved building and operating a mobile video production facility The Community Media Bus.

The technical limitations of the portapak video tape analog recording system, plus his desire to reach wider audiences led Zubrycki to switch to 16mm film. Zubrycki completed his first film Waterloo in 1981. The film, which focused attention on the negative social impacts of Sydney's rapid urban development in the suburb of Waterloo, won the prize for Best Documentary in the Greater Union Awards at the 1981 Sydney Film Festival.

Zubrycki's documentaries are personally intimate views about contemporary issues. He usually employs a "documentary observational mode" and his films are narrative-based and character-driven.

Zubrycki's first films to employ this style focused on the victims of Australia's rapid economic and social re-structuring. They were Kemira - Diary of a Strike (1984) about an underground colliery sit-in strike near Wollongong which won an AFI Award for Best Documentary in 1985, and Friends & Enemies (1985) about a protracted and bitter union dispute in Queensland that saw the rise of the New Right in Australia. In a case study of Friends & Enemies in the journal Studies in Documentary Film, Debra Beattie (2020) comments, "In showing the suffering and despair of workers and their families Zubrycki is like the Angel of History in Walter Benjamin's great mediation on the Paul Klee painting Angelus Novus".

In 1988, Zubrycki was contracted by Film Australia to write and direct a documentary commissioned by the Australian Council of Trade Unions (ACTU) and funded by The Australian Bicentennial Authority. However, owing to an editorial difference between the filmmaker and the ACTU, the film Amongst Equals was never officially completed. Zubrycki claimed that he was forced to re-write history in accordance with the wishes of key ACTU officials who wanted to de-emphasize direct industrial action as a way of improving wages and conditions.

In the early 1990s, Zubrycki's focus turned to migrant and refugee families and the stresses caused by cultural conflict, and the search for identity and home. In 1993, he completed Homelands, about an El Salvador refugee family and the anatomy of a marriage under stress. Margaret Smith (1993) reviewing the film in Cinema Papers comments on "its compelling images, empathetic characters, multi-layered storyline and sheer force of its narrative". This was followed by Billal (1995), a documentary that followed the aftermath of a racially motivated incident involving a Lebanese teenage boy and his family. Reviewing the film for Variety, David Stratton described the film as a "thought-provoking, and all too brief document of considerable impact".

=== 21st century ===
Zubrycki's next film was The Diplomat (2000), about the former exiled East Timor leader Jose Ramos-Horta and the final two years of his 25-year campaign to secure his homeland's independence. Jonathan Dawson called it his most "internationally successful" film.

In 2003, Zubrycki returned to Australia and made Molly & Mobarak. This observational documentary charts the unfolding relationship between a young Hazara man fleeing the Taliban who has been granted a temporary protection visa, and the daughter of one of his English teachers. David Stratton (2003), reviewing the film, wrote: "In humanizing an Afghani asylum-seeker, Zubrycki is being politically contentious". Efforts to prevent the film from screening to parliamentarians and their staff in Canberra shortly after the film’s release were ultimately defeated. Molly & Mobarak generated much commentary about the ethical nature of the filmmaker/subject relationship. Kate Nash (2003) observes: "Power circulates in the documentary relationship as filmmaker and participant pursue their own vision for the project… both make themselves vulnerable within the relationship".

In 2007, Zubrycki made Temple of Dreams, about an Islamic Youth Centre and its battle with the local municipal council that wants to shut it down. Like his earlier film Billal, the focus was on Lebanese Muslims in the suburbs of south West Sydney, young people whose identity is split between a war-torn homeland and contemporary Australia. Suzie Khamis (2004) notes, "These films prove a powerful counterpoint to a wider cultural tendency: to see Australian Lebanese Muslims though a narrow and detrimental prism".

In 2011, Zubrycki completed The Hungry Tide, a personal story about the impact of climate change on the small Pacific nation of Kiribati, which premiered at the Sydney Film Festival and screened in competition at IDFA. Shweta Kishore (2012) reviewing the film in Metro Magazine comments, "In The Hungry Tide, Tom Zubrycki peels away levels of obfuscation to reveal an urgent story of people facing the terror of climate change on their doorstep".

In 2018, Zubrycki was commissioned to write a platform paper about the issues facing the documentary film sector in Australia. The resultant monograph The Changing Landscape of Australian Documentary was published a year later. It reviews the history of documentary in Australia, and argued a strong case for government regulation of streaming platforms to compell them to invest in Australian documentaries.

== Filmography ==
List of films in which Zubrycki played a role such as director, writer or producer. All films source to Screen Australia, unless otherwise cited.

- 1981 Waterloo (Director, producer)
- 1984 Kemira - Diary of a Strike (Director, Producer)
- 1985 Friends & Enemies (Director, Producer)
- 1990 Lord of the Bush (Director, Producer)
- 1990 Amongst Equals (Writer, Director)
- 1991 Bran Nue Dae (Director, Producer)
- 1993 Homelands (Director, Writer, Producer)
- 1995 Billal (Director, Writer, Producer)
- 1996 Exile in Sarajevo (Producer)
- 1998 Whiteys Like Us (Producer)
- 2000 Stolen Generations (Producer)
- 2000 The Diplomat (Director)
- 2001 The Secret Safari (Director, Writer)
- 2002 Gulpilil - One Red Blood (Producer)
- 2002 Making Venus (Producer)
- 2003 Molly & Mobarak (Director, Producer, Dir of Photography)
- 2005 Vietnam Symphony (Director, Writer)
- 2006 The Prodigal Son (Producer)
- 2007 Temple of Dreams (Director, Writer, Producer)
- 2008 Mad Morro (Producer)
- 2009 The Intervention (Producer)
- 2011 The Hungry Tide (Director, Producer, Dir. of Photography)
- 2012 Light from the Shadows (Producer)
- 2013 The Sunnyboy (Producer)
- 2016 Dogs Of Democracy (Producer)
- 2017 Hope Road (Director, Producer, Dir. of Photography)
- 2017 The Panther Within (Producer)
- 2018 Teach A Man To Fish (Producer)
- 2020 The Weather Diaries (Producer)
- 2021 Ablaze (Producer)
- 2022 Senses Of Cinema (Co-director, Co-producer)
- 2023 "Memory Film - a filmmakers diary" (Co-producer).
- 2023 Kindred (Co-producer)
- 2023 The Carnival (Producer)

== Awards and honours ==
- 1984: AFI Awards, Best Documentary, Kemira - Diary of a Strike
- 1993: Film Critics Circle of Australia Award for "Homelands".
- 1998: International Emmy, Exile in Sarajevo
- 2000: AFI Award, Best Documentary, The Diplomat
- 2000: AFI Award, Best Direction, The Diplomat
- 2009: Cecil Holmes Award presented by Australian Directors Guild.
- 2010: Stanley Hawes Award presented by the Australian International Documentary Conference "in recognition of outstanding contribution to documentary filmmaking in Australia".
- 2021: Victorian Premier's History Award, with Alec Morgan and Tirki Onus, for Ablaze – A Feature Documentary
- 2021: Film Critics Circle of Australia Award for "Senses Of Cinema" joint award with John Hughes
