= Front Line (film) =

1979 film

- Directed by: David Bradbury
- Produced by: David Bradbury
- Release date: 1979
- Running time: 54:04 minutes
- Country: Australia
- Language: English

Front Line is a 1979 Australian documentary film directed by David Bradbury.

== Summary ==
It follows the career of Tasmanian-born combat cameraman Neil Davis, particularly his time in South Vietnam and Cambodia during the Vietnam War.

== Accolades ==
It was nominated for an Academy Award for Best Documentary Feature in 1981.

== Release ==
In the United States, Front Line aired on PBS. After it was nominated for an Academy Award, Cinema Ventures released Front Line in theaters.

== In popular culture ==
The oral consumption of chrome spray paint before combat in George Miller's Mad Max: Fury Road (2015) was inspired by a line in the documentary: soldiers putting the budda charms of their necklaces into their mouths before combat to protect them or to guide them in reincarnation.
