= Mrs Carey's Concert =

2011 documentary film

- Directed by: Bob Connolly; Sophie Raymond
- Produced by: Bob Connolly; Helen Panckhurst
- Cinematography: Bob Connolly
- Edited by: Nick Meyers; Sophie Raymond; Ray Thomas
- Release date: 2011
- Running time: 95 minutes
- Country: Australia
- Language: English

Mrs Carey's Concert is a 2011 Australian documentary film of a private girls' school's concert held at the Sydney Opera House and its lead-up at the school.

== Reception ==
On review aggregator Rotten Tomatoes, the film has an approval rating of 100% based on 8 reviews.

Mrs Carey's Concert made $1.6 million at the box office making it at the time the fourth highest grossing Australian documentary ever.

David Stratton for The Australian gave it 4 1/2 stars. He writes "This beautifully made film is inspirational in its positive depiction of the education process, the hard work and dedication of students and teachers alike, and in an event that surely will have a permanent impact on all the girls involved." Writing in The Age, Jake Wilson gave it 4/5 saying it "transcends its 'inspirational' format to rank as the best Australian film so far this year." SBS's Don Groves gave it 3 1/2 stars noting "The result is an illuminating, fly-on-wall study of the struggles, hard work, personal dramas, tears and triumphs involved in the challenging project." Ben McEachen of the Herald Sun gave it 3 1/2 stars and states "Connolly and Raymond provide such a sound overview of the rehearsal process that, by The Big Night, you will be suitably appreciative of what Carey, her staff and students have achieved." Leigh Paatsch, also of the Herald Sun, gave it 2 stars finishing "To be perfectly fair, Mrs Carey's Concert is a well-intentioned film about a small part of our much-maligned education sector working as it should. To be absolutely honest, Mrs Carey's Concert is a bland, dull and curiously impersonal experience."

== Awards ==
- 1st AACTA Awards
  - Best Feature Length Documentary - Bob Connolly, Helen Panckhurst and Sophie Raymond - won
  - Best Direction in a Documentary - Bob Connolly and Sophie Raymond - won
