= Facing the Music (2001 film) =

2001 film by Bob Connolly

- Directed by: Bob Connolly; Robin Anderson
- Produced by: Stefan Moore
- Starring: Anne Boyd; Winsome Evans
- Cinematography: Bob Connolly
- Edited by: Ray Thomas
- Production companies: Australian Broadcasting Corporation; Film Australia; Arundel Productions; Channel Four Television
- Release date: 2001
- Running time: 89 minutes
- Country: Australia
- Language: English
- Box office: $182,900

Facing the Music (2001) is an Australian documentary film, directed by Bob Connolly and Robin Anderson, about the wish of some staff members to keep the University of Sydney Department of Music alive in the face of budget overspending.

The film features music professor (Anne Boyd) struggling to run a dysfunctional department amid budget pressures. She has no training or capacity for the fundraising that is required.

At the end of 2004 the Music Department was merged with the Sydney Conservatorium of Music.

== Release ==
Facing the Music grossed $182,901 at the box office in Australia.

The film won the Cinematic Intelligence Agency Trenchcoat Awards 2002 for best documentary or true drama, Film Critics Circle of Australia 2002 for Best Australian documentary, and the Awards 2001 for Best Documentary. Both, Margaret Pomeranz and David Stratton from the SBS Movie Show rated it five stars.

== See also ==
- Cinema of Australia
- Music of Australia
