= David Bradbury (film maker) =

Australian filmmaker

- Education: Degree in Political Science from Australian National University
- Occupations: Filmmaker; Journalist
- Years active: 1972–present
- Notable work: Front Line, Public Enemy Number One, Blowin' In The Wind, A Hard Rain
- Awards: 2 Academy Award nominations, 5 Australian Film Industry awards, various international film festival prizes

David Bradbury is an Australian filmmaker who began his career in 1972 as an ABC radio journalist, and has since produced 21 documentary films, including many that tackle difficult political issues and highlight the plight of the disadvantaged. Bradbury has won many international film festival prizes, received five Australian Film Industry awards, and two Academy Award nominations. He graduated from the Australian National University with a degree in political science.

== Film career ==
Front Line

Bradbury's first film was Front Line, a portrait of Australian news cameraman Neil Davis in Vietnam. The film received an Academy Award nomination and also won first prize at the Sydney and Melbourne Film Festivals, the Grierson award at the American Film Festival and was screened worldwide.

Public Enemy Number One

Another of Bradbury's films, Public Enemy Number One, followed the life of controversial Australian journalist Wilfred Burchett, the first western journalist into Hiroshima after the bomb was dropped. The film won the Golden Gate Award for Best Documentary, the Christopher Statuette, Best Documentary at the Sydney Film Festival, and an AFI award, but was never shown on Australian TV.

Blowin' In The Wind

Blowin' In The Wind is about the joint military training facility at Shoalwater Bay near Rockhampton. This film follows on from Shoalwater: Up for Grabs which Bradbury worked on with then Midnight Oil lead singer Peter Garrett. Blowin' In The Wind looks at some of the health issues surrounding the Shoalwater Bay training facility and the effects of depleted uranium in theatres of war.

A Hard Rain

A Hard Rain is Bradbury's 2007 documentary feature film that looks at the global nuclear industry from the mining of uranium through to nuclear power, to the radioactive waste and nuclear weapons. It examines the issue of whether Australia should go nuclear.

=== Other films ===
Bradbury's other films include:

- 1984: Nicaragua No Pasaran
- 1985: Chile Hasta Cuando (Nominated in 1986 for an Academy Award for Best Documentary Feature.)
- 1987: South of the Border
- 1988: State of Shock
- 1993: Nazi Supergrass
- 1997: Loggerheads
- 1997: Jabiluka
- 2006: Raul The Terrible
- 2007: Survival School
- 2009: My Asian Heart
- 2012: On Borrowed Time
- 2023: The Road to War

== Awards ==
- Best Documentary Film at the 2006 Byron Bay International Film Festival for the movie Blowin' In The Wind.
- Stanley Hawes Award winner at the 2008 Australian International Documentary Conference.
- Honorary Mention at the 2011 Byron Bay International Film Festival
- Best Byron Film at the 2012 Byron Bay International Film Festival for the movie On Borrowed Time.

== Attempt at political career ==
Bradbury ran as an independent candidate in the 2025 Australian federal election in the seat of Grayndler against current Prime Minister Anthony Albanese.
