= Lenita Vangellis =

Australian actress

- Occupation: Actress
- Years active: 1984-2010
- Notable work: Six Pack (1992); Melvin, Son of Alvin (1984)

Lenita Vangellis is a Greek born Australian actress and model.

== Career ==
=== Acting ===
Vangellis appeared in the fifth episode of Six Pack, playing the episode's titular character Loulla. She had previously starred in Melvin, Son of Alvin, credited as Lenita Psillakis, followed by a three-month run on Neighbours.

=== Modelling ===
As a model she has appeared on the cover of Cleo (July 1984) and Fashion Quarterly (Winter 1988).

== Filmography ==
=== Film ===
- Melvin, Son of Alvin (1984) as Gloria
- Esteem (2016) as Self

=== Television ===
- Neighbours (1989) as Poppy Skouros (20 episodes)
- Six Pack (1992) as Loulla (episode 5: "Loulla")
- Bony (1992) as Rina (1 episode)
- G.P. (1994) as Dr Jessica Gillman (1 episode)
- Good Guys, Bad Guys (1997) as Anna Bitta (1 episode: "Only the Young Die Good")
- Home and Away (2010) as Nira Kassir (2 episodes)

== Awards ==
For her performance in Six Pack Vangellis was nominated for the 1992 Australian Film Institute Award for Best Lead Actress in a Telefeature.
