= List of Wicked Science episodes =

The following is a list of episodes of the Australian television show Wicked Science which aired for two seasons between 2004 and 2006.

== Series overview ==
Series	Episodes	Premiere	Finale
1	26	2 July 2004	24 December 2004
2	26	19 August 2005	6 April 2006

== Episodes ==
=== Series 1 (2004) ===
- Filmed in 2003.
- Aired in 2004 on Network Ten.

(Episode information retrieved from Australian Television Information Archive).

No. overall	No. in series	Title	Directed by	Written by	Original release date
1	1	"The Gift"	Grant Brown	Susan MacGillicuddy	2 July 2004
Toby and Elizabeth become scientific geniuses after being zapped by a scientific ray gun called the MFE. Elizabeth interferes with Toby's first experiment, cloning a T-rex instead of a Dodo.
2	2	"Secrecy"	Grant Brown	Greg Millin	9 July 2004
Toby tries to prove he is a genius by creating an anti-gravity machine and fixing it to the school's lawnmower. Elizabeth sabotages Toby's plans to make sure no one finds out they are both geniuses.
3	3	"Election"	Grant Brown	Susan MacGillicuddy	16 July 2004
Elizabeth and Dina both run for Class Rep. Elizabeth uses anti-friction spray on her competitor, putting Dina through a dangerous situation.
4	4	"Smart Judo"	Grant Brown	Greg Millin	23 July 2004
Elizabeth teams up with Garth to put some muscle into her plans.
5	5	"Hologram"	Grant Brown	Annie Fox	30 July 2004
Elizabeth frames Dina vandalising Mr. Tesslar's car, in hopes she is named Class Rep.
6	6	"Amazon Lab"	Grant Brown	Annie Fox	6 August 2004
Toby creates an organic growth accelerant for Dina, after Elizabeth makes Dina's hair fall out. The organic growth accelerant results in Dina growing a beard.
7	7	"Invisible Car"	Grant Brown	David Phillips	13 August 2004
Russ breaks Mr. Tesslar's car headlight, so Toby creates some invisibility paint until they can fix the headlight.
8	8	"Double Date"	Grant Brown	Helen MacWhirter	20 August 2004
Toby creates a robot Dina, so she can be on her date with Sean and work her shift at the same time.
9	9	"The Birthday Party"	Grant Brown	Peter Kinloch	27 August 2004
Toby throws a beach party for Bianca's birthday. Elizabeth is not invited, and makes a storm at the beach using electromagnetic waves on the clouds.
10	10	"Love Potion Number Nine"	Grant Brown	David Phillips	3 September 2004
Toby produces a pheromone compound to make the guys irresistible to the girls.
11	11	"Nanobots"	Grant Brown	Kris Mrksa	10 September 2004
Mr. Tesslar finds that the science equipment has been tampered and declares that the lab will be locked from then on.
12	12	"Surveillance"	Grant Brown	Susan MacGillicuddy	17 September 2004
Mr. Tesslar installs a security camera to find out who is using the lab. That way Elizabeth gets caught on the videotape.
13	13	"Centenary Bell"	Grant Brown	Susan MacGillicuddy	24 September 2004
Elizabeth is sacked as director of the school's centenary celebration and vows to ruin the celebration by destabilizing the set.
14	14	"Secret Lab"	Richard Jasek	David Phillips	1 October 2004
Elizabeth sets up a secret lab in the school's basement and orders Garth to shrink objects from the storeroom but Dina discovers him. Completely panicked, he shrinks Dina.
15	15	"Exploding Melon"	Richard Jasek	David Phillips	8 October 2004
In her basement-founded lab, Elizabeth uses too much power and Mr. Tesslar tries to track it down, but she sets up Toby and Russ to keep the lab's location safe.
16	16	"Fame"	Richard Jasek	Annie Fox	15 October 2004
Toby makes special gloves which allow Russ to play the guitar like a rock star. Elizabeth launches her new line of makeup called Mood - which is a huge hit.
17	17	"Transporter"	Richard Jasek	Annie Fox	22 October 2004
Toby intercepts Elizabeth's teleportation machine and so, he is teleported to Elizabeth's secret lab.
18	18	"Weird Date"	Richard Jasek	Peter Kinloch	29 October 2004
Toby creates a remote control that allows him to win an arcade game, but the game goes berserk.
19	19	"Excursion"	Richard Jasek	Helen MacWhirter	5 November 2004
Toby modifies the MFE machine to scan for Bianca in a rocky landscape. During the excursion, he finds a rock that reacts strangely to the MFE.
20	20	"Nanna"	Richard Jasek	Susan Macgillicuddy	12 November 2004
Toby's nanna is sent back in time through a wormhole generator and a younger version of Toby's nanna comes through the wormhole, destroying the generator.
21	21	"Virtual Game"	Richard Jasek	Greg Millan	19 November 2004
Toby decides to create a visual memory for Russ who holds the missing element of how he and Elizabeth became geniuses.
22	22	"Russ Rampant"	Richard Jasek	Greg Millan	26 November 2004
Toby finds the correct sequence, called the genius key. He accidentally turns Russ into a genius.
23	23	"Tractor Beam"	Richard Jasek	Susan Macgillicuddy	3 December 2004
Toby attempts to use the genius key to turn off Elizabeth's genius. Toby and Elizabeth meet secretly in the gym, and just as Toby prepares to cancel Elizabeth's genius, Mr Tesslar walks in seeing Toby with the stolen MFE.
24	24	"Clone Vyner"	Richard Jasek	Annette Moor	10 December 2004
Elizabeth clones Ms Vyner so she can control the school. Under threat of expulsion for being caught with the MFE, Toby tells Mr Tesslar everything about his genius. He goes to Ms Vyner about it, but he is really talking to Clone Vyner, and Mr Tesslar is fired.
25	25	"Checkmate"	Richard Jasek	Greg Millin	17 December 2004
Elizabeth takes Bianca captive in the hope Toby will give her the genius key, or she will use the shrink ray on Bianca.
26	26	"End Game"	Richard Jasek	Greg Millin	24 December 2004
Season finale; Elizabeth reveals a T-rex to a press conference at the school, but the T-rex rampages through the school. Toby creates a giant doll to fight the T-rex, and the doll wins. Toby zaps himself and Elizabeth with the MFE, removing their genius. However, Elizabeth still has the genius key in the pocket.

=== Series 2 (2005–2006) ===
- Filmed between 2004–2005.
- Aired between 2005–2006 on Network Ten.

(Episode information retrieved from Australian Television Information Archive).

No. overall	No. in series	Title	Directed by	Written by	Original release date
27	1	"The Flies"	David Cameron	David Phillips & Philip Dalkin	19 August 2005
A new student arrives at Sandy Bay School, Jack. His only wish is to discover Elizabeth and Toby's secret. Elizabeth has turned Toby's cousin Sasha and Russ into flies.
28	2	"Sweet Dreams"	Roger Hodgman	Joanne Watson	26 August 2005
Elizabeth's experimenting ends up making Sasha's teeth fall out in the bathroom sink. Thinking Garth will leave her as her sidekick Elizabeth causes him to grow breasts until he joins her for good. Will Elizabeth ever learn?
29	3	"Superfish"	David Cameron	David Phillips	2 September 2005
When Toby wants to get into the swim team to impress Niki, he makes a formula that makes him swim like a fish. But what will happen when Elizabeth finds out
30	4	"Fever"	Roger Hodgman	Simon Butters	9 September 2005
After Elizabeth gets a deadly fever from Verity, she must do everything anyone ask when needing help. Soon finding out that she could die she requires Toby's help. Will Toby save her?
31	5	"A Friend in Need"	Roger Hodgman	Simon Butters	16 September 2005
Toby ruins Niki's project and his friends try to help him win back Niki by imposing as Toby and giving her a new one. But Elizabeth notices something is up.
32	6	"The Great Dork"	Roger Hodgman	Sam Carroll	23 September 2005
Russ is convinced he is a loser, so Toby helps by building a time machine so Russ can see his heroic ancestors. But it all goes wrong and Russ is time-swapped with a man from prehistoric times. Will Toby be able to save Russ?
33	7	"Close Call"	David Cameron	Max Dann	30 September 2005
Elizabeth is forced to move her gadgets from her lab temporarily. In a mixed turn of events Jack finds them. Now that he is closer than ever to Toby and Elizabeth's secret, what will they do?
34	8	"Ring of Confidence"	David Cameron	Judith Colquhoun	7 October 2005
After Niki gets criticized by her swimming coach, she tells Toby not to worry about it and says it's a confidence thing. Toby makes her a confidence ring, but when Russ puts it on, he refuses to take it off, until he loses it. Meanwhile, Verity wants to form a cheer squad to help win the swimming championships but keeps getting ignored, until she finds the ring.
35	9	"Misty"	Roger Hodgman	Sam Carroll	14 October 2005
Elizabeth zaps herself and Toby into a virtual reality game. Meanwhile Sasha gets reunited with her childhood horse.
36	10	"Catch Me if You Can"	Colin Budds	Chris Anastassiades	21 October 2005
Toby and Niki finally go on a date, but Elizabeth has a plan for them. Jack sees one of Toby's inventions and tries to get it for himself.
37	11	"Koala in the Mist"	David Cameron	Simon Butters	28 October 2005
Toby and his friends discover a koala, whilst Garth's stupidity lands the enlarger ray in Jack's hands. By a series of events the koala enlarges and causes havoc across the school in a mist created by Toby? Will Toby and Elizabeth's secret come out? Will Jack act on his suspicions?
38	12	"A Day in the Life"	Colin Budds	Max Dann	4 November 2005
Sacha Johnson and Russ Skinner accidentally swap bodies after Russ bumped Sasha to one Toby's inventions and then the Machine zapped them together in front of the machine. They learn to appreciate together each other's good qualities.
39	13	"A Bolt from the Blue"	Colin Budds	Max Dann	9 November 2005
Elizabeth, hung up on Toby, blackmails him to go to the social with her and not Niki, whom he had already been asked by. Although, Elizabeth's blackmail device causes chaos when it falls into Jack's hands and she is forced to tell him their secret.
40	14	"The Weakest Link"	Colin Budds	Simon Butters	18 November 2005
Because no one trusts Jack, he makes sure that Toby and his friends are all distracted so that he can take a peek in Toby's shed. But will he end up regretting this?
41	15	"Talk to the Animals"	Sally-Anne Kerr	Susan MacGillicuddy	25 November 2005
Elizabeth's tricks accidentally enable Sasha with extraordinary abilities to communicate with animals Dr. Dolittle style. Sasha uses her new talent to hilariously punish Elizabeth.
42	16	"Verity from the Black Lagoon"	Colin Budds	Susan MacGillicuddy	2 December 2005
After Verity does an experiment by a lake, the experiment goes wrong and Verity is slowly turning into an amphibious monster.
43	17	"The Truth is Out There"	Sally-Anne Kerr	Sam Carroll	9 December 2005
When Elizabeth goes to any extent to get information out of Russ, Jack finally gets evidence proving they are geniuses. Will he get away with it?
44	18	"Air Dog"	Sally-Anne Kerr	Alix Beane	16 December 2005
Toby uses his flying machine to help Russ, but doesn't know Jack is watching. Meanwhile, a dog-lover offers to donate money to the school. How will Jack try to blackmail Toby for the genius key this time?
45	19	"Crazy for You"	Sally-Anne Kerr	Greg Millin	17 February 2006
Elizabeth creates a freaky machine to be her new assistant, but it becomes consumed with the idea that he must protect Elizabeth and soon her safety is in danger.
46	20	"Time Loop"	Sally-Anne Kerr	Greg Millin	24 February 2006
Angry that Toby and Nikki are together, Elizabeth sticks Toby in a time loop, so he repeats the same day over and over again.
47	21	"Underwater"	Jeffrey Walker	Jo Watson	3 March 2006
Once Mr Woods and Elizabeth are paralyzed by octopus poison, both Toby's side and Elizabeth's companions have to team up together to find an antidote.
48	22	"Ghost Girl"	Jeffrey Walker	Philip Dalkin	9 March 2006
Elizabeth gets revenge on a famous Hollywood actress who starts attending their school by playing a childish prank.
49	23	"Spider Boy"	Jeffrey Walker	Jo Watson	16 March 2006
Garth's prankster cousin Rodney pays a visit. Whilst staying he manages to not only annoy everyone, but also turn into a half-man half-spider (Spiderboy).
50	24	"Meet the Parents"	Jeffrey Walker	Chris Anastassiades	23 March 2006
Toby has to meet Nikki's parents. But Jack and Elizabeth have teamed up to make it a disaster.
51	25	"Jack Makes His Move"	Jeffrey Walker	Greg Millin	30 March 2006
Elizabeth decides to use Jack to make Toby jealous. All the while Jack is using Elizabeth to find out more information and to steal the disc.
52	26	"King Cuddly"	Colin Budds	Greg Millin	6 April 2006
Series finale. Still love-struck, Jack talks Elizabeth into making Toby normal again. She agrees and goes off to perform it. While she is out of the way, Jack turns himself into a genius. Will Toby come to her rescue when she's held by a giant koala?
