= The President Versus David Hicks =

2004 documentary film

- Directed by: Curtis Levy; Bentley Dean (co-director)
- Produced by: Curtis Levy
- Cinematography: Bentley Dean
- Music by: Felicity Fox
- Release date: 2004
- Running time: 52 minutes
- Country: Australia
- Language: English

The President Versus David Hicks is a 2004 documentary film following Terry Hicks's as he tries to understand how his son David Hicks ended up in Guantanamo Bay.

== Reception ==
The Sydney Morning Herald writes "If there's a single message to be taken from all this, it's in the thought that moral absolutes are elusive on all sides of the war." Variety's Russell Edwards states "Film’s strengths are that it doesn’t bother making a case for Hick’s innocence or excessively wring its hands over his imprisonment. Though Hicks remains an enigma, his life is undeniably intriguing — and docu conveys this with conviction, as well as Hicks Sr.’s love for his wayward son" On ABC's At the Movies both David Stratton and Margaret Pomeranz gave it 4 stars with Stratton saying "This is a documentary which every concerned Australian should see."

== Awards ==
- 2004 Australian Film Institute Awards
  - Best Documentary - Curtis Levy - won
  - Best Direction in a Documentary - Bentley Dean, Curtis Levy - nominated
