= Ned Lander =

Australian film producer

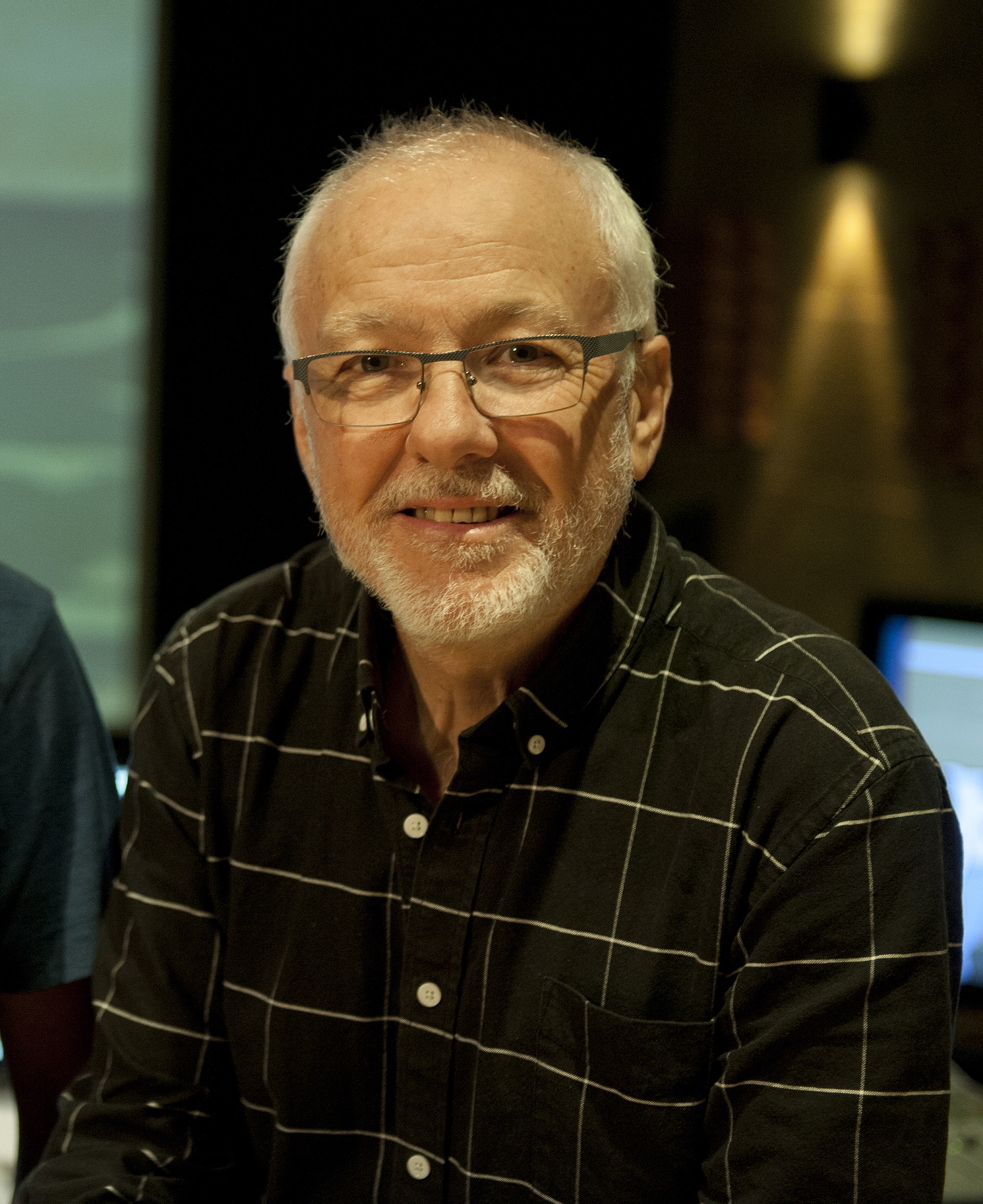
- Lander at the AACTA Awards in 2015 for Last Cab to Darwin
- Born: 6 April 1956 (age 70); Adelaide, South Australia, Australia
- Occupations: Producer; Director
- Years active: 1974-present
- Known for: Wrong Side of the Road; Last Cab to Darwin; Radiance; Little J & Big Cuz
- Awards: AACTA Awards; Jury Prize, 1981; Best Documentary, 1994 Logie Awards; Most Outstanding Children's Program, 2018

Ned Lander is an Australian film producer, director, and former head of SBS Independent, from Adelaide, South Australia.

He has produced or commissioned many culturally significant programs, including the animated children's series Little J and Big Cuz (2017), Last Cab to Darwin (2015) and Radiance (1998).

He is best known for directing Wrong Side of the Road (1981), a drama-documentary spotlighting Aboriginal musicians, which earned the Jury Prize at the Australian Film Institute Awards. Another notable work is 50 Years Of Silence (1994), which won the AACTA award for Best Documentary.

== Filmography ==
Filmography
Year	Title	Producer	Director	Notes	Genre	Ref.		
1980	Dirt Cheap	Yes		Co-Writer	Documentary			
1981	Wrong Side of the Road	Yes	Yes	Co-Writer	Feature	Jury Prize 1982 “Starstruck” the movie. Plays the role of Robbie and band member of The Wombats. “The Restless Years”  plays the character of Hodgo	1983	Molly
1987	Painting the Town	Yes	Yes		Feature		Documentary	
1988	Bachelor Girl	Yes			Feature			
1989	Into the Mainstream	Yes	Co-Director		Documentary			
1993	Blood Brothers: Broken English	Co-Producer	Yes	Writer	Documentary			
1993	Blood Brothers: Freedom Ride	Yes			Documentary			
1993	Blood Brothers: From Little Things Big Things Grow	Yes			Documentary			
1993	Blood Brothers: Jardiwarnpa, a Warlpiri Fire Ceremony	Yes	Yes		Documentary			
1994	50 Years Of Silence	Yes	Yes		Documentary	Best Documentary		
1998	Radiance	Yes			Feature			
2001	Doing Dimboola	Executive			Documentary			
2002	In Limbo	Executive			Documentary			
2003	Handle With Care	Executive			Documentary			
2003	The Riddle of the Bradshaws	Executive			Documentary			
2003	Yum Cha Cha	Executive			Documentary			
2005	Swapping Lives	Executive			Documentary			
2008	Baby Boom to Bust	Executive			Documentary			
2009	A Family Divided	Executive			Documentary			
2012	Make Hummus Not War	Co-Producer			Documentary			
2012	Singapore 1942: End of Empire	Executive			Documentary			
2012	Dangerous Remedy	Yes			Feature			
2015	Last Cab to Darwin	Executive			Feature			
2016	Monsieur Mayonnaise	Yes			Documentary			
2017	Little J & Big Cuz (season 1)	Yes			Animated Series	Most Outstanding Children's Program		
2020	Little J & Big Cuz (season 2)	Yes			Animated Series			
In Production	Little J & Big Cuz (season 3)	Yes			Animated Series			
