= Half Life: A Parable for the Nuclear Age =

- Directed by: Dennis O'Rourke
- Written by: Dennis O'Rourke
- Produced by: Dennis O'Rourke
- Cinematography: Dennis O'Rourke
- Edited by: Tim Litchfield
- Music by: Bob Brozman
- Production companies: O'Rourke and Associates Filmmakers Pty. Ltd.
- Distributed by: Kino International
- Release date: 20 February 1985
- Running time: 86 minutes
- Country: Australia
- Languages: English; Marshallese

Half Life: A Parable for the Nuclear Age is a 1985 Australian documentary film directed by Dennis O'Rourke, concerning the American Castle Bravo nuclear testing at the Marshall Islands in 1954.

The film features interviews with residents of the nearby Rongelap and Utirik Atolls who were affected by nuclear fallout from the tests. Unlike in previous nuclear tests and despite the considerably more powerful nuclear explosion involved, these residents were not relocated to a safer location. Declassified American military footage is included in the production.

== Awards ==
In 1986 the film won the Peace Film Award at the Berlin International Film Festival.

== See also ==
- Radio Bikini
- Operation Crossroads
