= Molly & Mobarak =

- Directed by: Tom Zubrycki
- Produced by: Tom Zubrycki
- Starring: Mobarak Tahiri; Lyn Rule; Molly Rule
- Cinematography: Tom Zubrycki
- Edited by: Ray Thomas
- Music by: Alister Spence
- Release date: 7 August 2003
- Running time: 85 minutes
- Country: Australia
- Language: English

Molly & Mobarak is a 2003 Australian documentary directed by Tom Zubrycki. It follows a Hazara asylum seeker, 22-year-old Mobarak Tahiri, as he falls in love with 25-year-old Molly Rule, and faces possible deportation as his temporary visa nears expiration. In 2003, it was nominated for best documentary at the IF Awards.
