= Byron Kennedy Award =

Australian film award

- Awarded for: "outstanding creative enterprise within the film and television industries."
- Country: Australia
- Presented by: Australian Academy of Cinema and Television Arts (AACTA)
- First award: 1984; 42 years ago
- Currently held by: Greig Fraser (2025)
- Website: www.aacta.org/aacta-awards/byron-kennedy-award-40-years/

The Byron Kennedy Award is presented by Kennedy Miller Mitchell in association with Australian Academy of Cinema and Television Arts (AACTA) to an individual or organisation whose work embodies innovation and the relentless pursuit of excellence.

== History ==
The award is given to an individual or organization whose work embodies the qualities of Byron Kennedy: innovation, vision, and the relentless pursuit of excellence.

From 1984 to 2010, the award was handed out by the Australian Film Institute (AFI), the Academy's parent organisation, at the annual Australian Film Institute Awards (known as the AFI Awards). When the AFI launched the Academy in 2011, it changed the annual ceremony to the AACTA Awards, with the award being a continuum of the AFI Byron Kennedy Award.

On the 10th anniversary of the establishment of AACTA in 2020, the Byron Kennedy Award was selected to celebrate low-budget independent films. As the nominees were announced, AACTA wrote that the award would "recognise an Australian film that illustrates the resourcefulness, inventiveness, originality and excellence that Byron Kennedy embodied through his genre-defining work with George Miller on Mad Max".

== Description ==
The Byron Kennedy Award is presented by the Australian Academy of Cinema and Television Arts (AACTA), a non-profit organisation whose aim is "to identify, award, promote and celebrate Australia's greatest achievements in film and television."

It recognises a person in their early career for "outstanding creative enterprise within the film and television industries... whose work embodies the qualities of Byron Kennedy: innovation, vision and the relentless pursuit of excellence." Recommendations for recipients are made by the general public, but the AFI and Academy may also select further candidates without the need for an entry. The award includes a A$10,000 cash prize. It may be awarded to makers of film or television shows.

The award is presented at the annual AACTA Awards Ceremony, which hand out accolades for technical achievements in feature film, television, documentaries, and short films.

== Recipients ==
Year	Name	Notes	Ref(s)
1984	Roger Savage	"for his innovative and pioneering work in film and television sound."	
1985	Andrew Pike	"for his unorthodox and comprehensive contribution to the film industry."	
1986	Nadia Tass and David Parker	"for their fiercely independent approach to filmmaking."	
1987	Martha Ansara	"for her uncompromising use of film as a vehicle for consciousness- raising and her consistent help to filmmakers at the beginning of their careers."	
1988	George Ogilvie	"for the profound wisdom of his work in theatre, film, television and ballet, and his highly influential workshops on ensemble performance."	
1989	Jane Campion	"for her innovative, highly individual and uncompromising work in writing, producing and directing a body of outstanding films and television programmes which have gained recognition both in Australia and overseas."	
1990	Dennis O'Rourke	"for his consistent innovation as an artist in the field of documentary."	
1991	John Duigan	"for an impressive and original body of work both as writer and director, and through that work, his discovery and encouragement of new talent."	
1992	Robin Anderson and Bob Connolly	"whose films are not only fine documentaries - they are great human dramas. They will allow no obstacle to divert their single-minded pursuit of excellence."	
1993	Adrian Martin	"a writer, teacher and critic, and a brilliant enthusiast who can inspire even the most jaded audiences."	
1993	Matt Butler	"a pioneer of computer assisted cinematography and a world leader in specialist experimental film techniques."	
1993	Evonne Chesson	"a wonderful animal trainer who worked on everything from Breaker Morant [1980] to The Silver Brumby [1993], and who contributed extraordinarily to the Australian film industry."	
1993	Gary Warner	"an administrator, curator and champion of the new electronic arts technologies, who keeps Australian media and artists in touch with the newest and the best the world has to offer."	
1994	John Hargreaves	"not only for the brilliance and daring of his acting, but for his ability to inspire. When Hargreaves is around, everybody gives their best."	
1995	Jill Bilcock	"Jill's stylish and effervescent approach to life, determination to excel and creativity shine through. Many have owed their start in this business to her generous sharing of some of the great mysteries of film."	
1996	Laura Jones	"for her consistent and passionate pursuit of excellence as a screenwriter. Her rigour and integrity serve to inspire all those who work with her."	
1997	John Polson	"for his founding of the remarkable and charismatic Tropicana Short Film Festival. From its very humble beginnings in 1993 Tropfest has become the leading event of its kind in the world."	
1998	Alison Barrett	"one of Australia's foremost casting agents."	
1998	Arthur Cambridge	"colour grader of at least 300 Australian feature films, which is more than half of the Australian industry's output since the early 1970s."	
1999	Baz Luhrmann and Catherine Martin	"for their process of 'Total Filmmaking'. Never conventional, they immerse the whole team, from actor to editor, in experimentation and pre-visualisation. In this way, they evolve a comprehensive aesthetic which informs everything, from the concept to poster, with flair. The results, always groundbreaking, speak for themselves."	
2000	Popcorn Taxi (founded by Matt Wheeldon and Gary Doust) and Independent Filmmakers (IF) Magazine (founded by Stephen Jenner and David Barda) (Note: First organisations to receive the award)	"Two spirited, grassroots enterprises fuelled by nothing but reckless enthusiasm and love of cinema. Popcorn Taxi and IF Magazine are the antidote to the beancounters who forgot to ask where ideas and innovation come from, if you strangle film culture."	
2001	Ian David	"is a truth teller...no matter what the cost. His screenplays for Blue Murder [1995] flag the high water mark of Australian television drama. Beyond that, he is a selfless campaigner for artist's rights. The truth at any cost...These days, his is a rare voice. It is to be cherished."	
2002	Rachel Perkins	"for her vast amount and breadth of her work as writer, director, producer, executive producer and instigator across drama, documentary and television; for her dynamism and creativity; for her outstanding ability to inspire others and work collaboratively; and for her passionate championing of indigenous filmmaking and filmmakers."	
2003	Dion Beebe	"for his unique and daring eye used through a wide range of styles from the documentary Eternity [1994] to the films of Jane Campion Holy Smoke! [1999] and In the Cut [2003] and Gillian Armstrong Charlotte Gray [2001] to the 2002's Academy Award winner, Chicago [2002]."	
2004	John Clarke	"for his works of sustained excellence and for the inspiration he presents to all of us in his roles as poet, playwright, actor, author, director and producer."	
2005	Chris Kennedy	"Production designer Chris Kennedy represents the best qualities of Australian film crews. Too often working with low budgets, he tackles each film with wit, love and late nights. Inspired in his resourcefulness he will always push beyond the superficial and ordinary. His work has enhanced our cinema for the last two decades...from Death in Brunswick [1991], through Angel Baby [1995] to The Proposition [2005]."	
2006	Rolf de Heer	"for his unflagging artistic courage across an astonishing body of work from Bad Boy Bubby [1993] to Ten Canoes [2006]. Rolf de Heer is a fearless explorer of cinema and humanity. He has achieved what no other filmmaker has done; taken Australian culture globally while being recognised as one of world cinema's most daring and unique artists."	
2007	Curtis Levy	"for his dedication to the art of documentary over the past twenty-five years and his continued questioning of the status quo. A modest and courageous man who has directed and produced films of great relevance, technical skill and humanity; from his award-winning films The President Versus David Hicks [2004] and Hephzibah [1998] to Sons of Namatjira [1975]."	
2008	Chris Lilley	"for his unique, multidimensional skills as an actor, writer and producer. His groundbreaking series' We Can Be Heroes: [Finding The Australian of the Year] [2005] and Summer Heights High [2007], at once poignant and hilarious, mark him as an incisive observer of our national culture and a potent artist relentlessly in search of excellence and truth."	
2009	Ray Brown	"Legendary grip, gentleman, statesman and unsung hero. For his superb, solution-orientated management skills, his spirited advocacy of the industry and for his full-hearted mentorship and support of movies great and small. For those who strive for excellence...Brownie is the exemplar."	
2010	Animal Logic	"for aesthetic and technical excellence in computer graphic imaging. Under the stewardship of Zareh Nalbandian, this visual effects house has risen with the digital revolution to become one of the world's leading facilities."	
2011	Ivan Sen	"for his unique artistic vision and for showing us, by his resourceful multidisciplinary filmmaking, that telling stories on screen is in reach of all who have something consequential to say."	
2013	Sarah Watt (Note: Awarded posthumously)	"for her brave, innovative filmmaking. Painter, photographer, animator, she brought consummate skill and elegance to the live action form. Without pretension, her work broke all the rules, yet her singular view connected to a wide audience by its profound emotional honesty."	
2014	Australian Cinematographers Society	"for its enduring and pivotal role in the pursuit of excellence throughout Australian cinema. With its cohort of world-renowned cinematographers, the ACS is about enhancing skills, exploring new technology and passing on knowledge to those who follow in their footsteps. Their enthusiasm and generosity of spirit makes them the backbone of our industry."	
2015	Amiel Courtin-Wilson	"for his risk taking and evocative storytelling. Amiel has been patiently searching for truth and beauty at the margins of society, making films which have captured the attention of international audiences."	
2015	Adam Arkapaw	"for his pursuit of excellence and devotion to the art of cinematography. His work, already acknowledged as virtuosic and innovative, is always in the service of the story.	
2016	Lynette Wallworth	"for her innovative use of virtual reality and her tireless work pushing the boundaries of screen, using emerging technologies and visionary artistic media to engage audiences around the world in new, innovative experiences."	
2017	Martin Butler and Bentley Dean	"in recognition of their ten-year low-tech partnership which has focused on genuine collaboration with Indigenous communities to produce some of the most emotionally compelling stories ever seen on screen."	
2018	Ian Darling	"for his brave, innovative and wide-ranging pursuit of excellence. All of his endeavours are about social impact, and his global and synergistic approach is uniquely effective in forging strong and productive coalitions of storytellers, filmmakers, funders, distributors, and strategic thinkers. Ian is also the founder of Shark Island Institute, Good Pitch Australia and the Documentary Australia Foundation, with all of whom he shares the award."	
2019	P. J. Voeten	The masterful First Assistant Director. "To do PJ’s job one needs the logistical skills of a field marshal, the brain power of a grandmaster chess player and the nurturing multitasking of an infant school teacher. With these skills, PJ been at the heart of Australian cinema for 3 decades. His work ranges from Crocodile Dundee [1986] to Mad Max: Fury Road [2015] and just about everything else in between. Included among the many directors whose films he has graced are Mel Gibson, George Miller and the great Asian Masters Bong Joon Ho, and Zhang Yimou. All of them regard him as one of kind - a film practitioner without peer."	
2020	Jennifer Kent's The Babadook (2014) (Note: First film to receive the award)	"Widely lauded as an authentically fresh take on horror, writer/director Jennifer Kent’s The Babadook was the recipient of The Byron Kennedy Award. Kent's masterful control of the taut script and tension-fuelling direction saw her win two AACTA Awards – Best Direction and Screenplay – for The Babadook, which also won the AACTA Award for Best Film in 2015. The film was also celebrated around the world, winning a total of 56 awards."	
2023	Bruna Papandrea	"in recognition of her contribution to the screen industry as one of the country’s most revered producers."	
2024	Greig Fraser	"in recognition of his extraordinary contributions to the screen industry, his pioneering use of technology, and his distinct visual style that has redefined cinematic experiences worldwide."	
