= Birthday Boy (2004 film) =

- Directed by: Sejong Park
- Written by: Sejong Park
- Produced by: Andrew Gregory
- Edited by: Adrian Rostirolla
- Music by: James K. Lee
- Release date: June 8, 2004
- Running time: 8 minutes
- Country: Australia
- Language: Korean

Birthday Boy is a 2004 short animated film written and directed by Sejong Park (박세종) while a student at Australian Film, Television and Radio School (AFTRS). The film has won more than 30 awards at film festivals around the world.

== Plot ==
An on-screen title sets the action in Korea, 1951. The film tells the story of a young boy, Manuk, who roams a seemingly deserted town to glean and recycle the debris of war. We first meet him in the wreck of an aeroplane, looking for a particular piece of war refuse – a bolt – to turn into a toy soldier for his collection. He sings a song about a bear. Upon hearing the unmistakable low whistle of a train in the distance he runs to the track and places the bolt on the rail. The train thunders past on its urgent mission to carry tanks to the front. Manuk stands mesmerised, and grins widely. Once the train has passed he retrieves the bolt which has become magnetised. He makes his way through the town, pretending to be a soldier engaged in house-to-house fighting until his attention is captured by the drone of aeroplane engines. Silently he watches them slowly cross the sky. His war game begins again as he crouches behind rocks on a ridge overlooking an area with houses jumbled together. A postman cycles down the road below Manuk's hiding place. Manuk imagines he is with his dad, pinned down by enemy fire. "Dad, there are too many of them," he cries as the sound of machine guns and artillery fire fill his head. "But we are braver than them," his father replies in the game. Manuk picks up a rock as if it is a hand grenade, expertly pulls the pin with his teeth and hurls it at the enemy crying "Dad, get down!" He waits, crouched, fingers in ears for the explosion which never comes. Instead, we hear the postman cry in surprise and pain, before crashing his bicycle and shouting at his unseen tormentor. Manuk slinks away and climbs the hill towards his home. He takes a key from a special hiding spot, and approaches the verandah in front of his house. He notices a parcel and hurries to open it. He pulls out an old leather wallet containing a faded black and white photograph of a man crouching with a child dressed as Manuk is now, but much younger. Manuk gently caresses the photograph with his thumb. He then pulls out a set of dog tags, and an old boot. He marches up and down in front of his house, wearing the boots as if he is a soldier on guard. Later, inside the house, he plays with the toy soldiers and tanks he has made from bits and pieces of metal he has found and falls asleep on the floor. His mother appears at the door, saying "Manuk, Mum is home".

== Background ==
The film is set in Korea, during the Korean War. About 17,000 Australians served in the war between 1950 and 1953, with casualties numbering 339 dead and 1200 wounded.

== Reception ==
Birthday Boy has won over 40 awards at film festivals around the world including Best Animated Short at the SIGGRAPH Computer Animation Festival in 2004 which qualified the film for the 2005 Academy Awards even before Park and fellow students had graduated from the AFTRS. It was subsequently nominated for the Oscar for Best Animated Short Film. Other awards include the Prix Jean-Luc Xiberras at the Annecy International Animated Film Festival in 2005 (which had a special focus on Korea) and Best Short Animation at the 2005 BAFTA awards. It has screened at over 100 film festivals around the world, and is the most awarded film in the almost forty-year history of the AFTRS.

== Legacy ==
The film was considered a diasporic achievement for the Korean diaspora and its power to empower Korean Australians by the Sydney Morning Herald (한국신문) and was considered to have presented a way to keep the Korean cultural identity in its remembrance of the Korean War. Scholar Lee Sung-ae considers the film significant for "redefining parameters of geography, national identity and belonging".
