= Dennis O'Rourke =

Australian cinematographer and documentary filmmaker

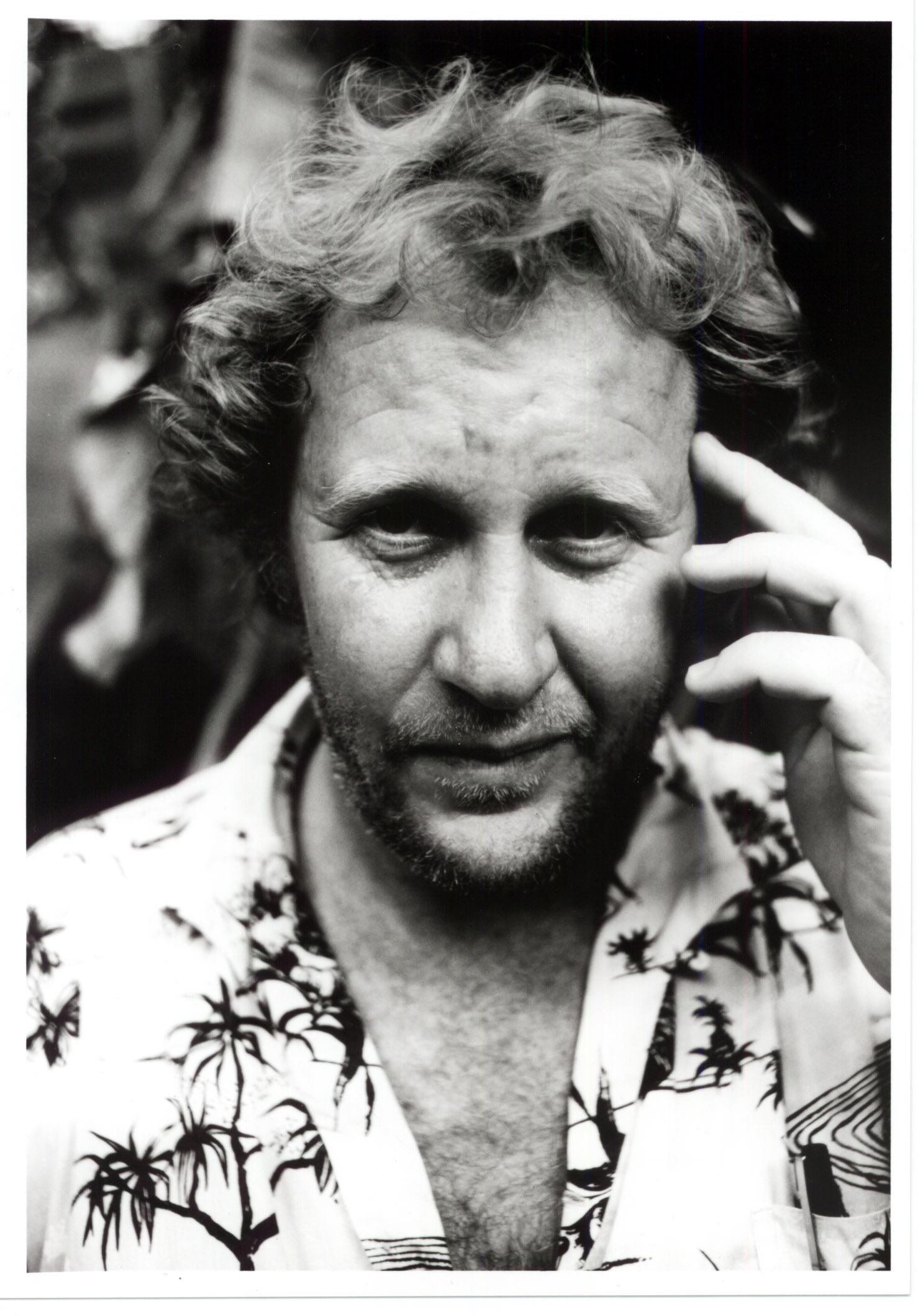
- Dennis O'Rourke, 1988
- Born: 14 August 1945; Brisbane, Queensland, Australia
- Died: 15 June 2013 (aged 67); Queensland, Australia

Dennis O'Rourke (14 August 1945 – 15 June 2013) was an Australian cinematographer and documentary filmmaker.

== Early life and education ==
Dennis O'Rourke was born on 14 August 1945 in Brisbane. For most of his childhood, Dennis O'Rourke lived in a small country town, where his parents ran a failing business, until he was sent to a Catholic boarding school for his secondary education.

In the late 1960s, after two years of fruitless university studies, he went travelling in outback Australia, the Pacific Islands and South East Asia. During this period he worked as a farm hand, salesman, cowboy, a roughneck on oil rigs, and as a maritime seaman. He also taught himself photography and dreamt of becoming a photojournalist. Wanting to make documentary films, he moved to Sydney, where the Australian Broadcasting Corporation employed him as an assistant gardener. He later became a cinematographer for that organisation.

== Career ==
From 1974 until 1979 he lived in Papua New Guinea, which was in the process of decolonisation. He worked for the newly independent government, teaching documentary filmmaking skills to Papua New Guineans. His first film, Yumi Yet - Independence for Papua New Guinea, was completed in 1976.

O'Rourke's film Half Life: A Parable for the Nuclear Age was screened at a Leicester Square cinema in London in 1986.

Controversy sometimes surrounded O'Rourke's interactions with, and depiction of, the individuals who were subjects of his documentaries, such as The Good Woman of Bangkok (released in 1991), which concerned a sex worker in Thailand and Cunnamulla (2000), which was made up mostly of monologues by residents of the Queensland town of the same name, discussing everyday life.

In 2007, O'Rourke was awarded damages by the Australian Capital Territory Supreme Court for defamation. The action followed the reporting of comments accusing O'Rourke of unscrupulous conduct during the filming of Cunnamulla. The awards were made against an Aboriginal rights activist and Nationwide News Pty Ltd (a subsidiary of News Corporation), as the parent company of the Sydney Daily Telegraph and The Australian.

== Later life and death ==
O'Rourke died of cancer on 15 June 2013. Immediately before his death, he had been producing and directing an uncompleted and unreleased feature-length documentary titled I Love a Sunburnt Country... – on the subject of Australian identity, as seen through the "poetic imagination" of "ordinary people".

He was the father of five children.

== Recognition ==
O'Rourke was awarded an Australian Centenary Medal "for services to Australian society and Australian film production".

In 2005, he received the Don Dunstan Award at the Adelaide Film Festival, for his contribution to the Australian film industry.

Other awards and honours included:

- Eastman Kodak Award for Cinematography
- Australian Film Institute's Byron Kennedy Award
- Director's Prize for Extraordinary Achievement, Sundance Film Festival
- Grand Prix at the Visions du réel film festival in Nyon, Switzerland
- Jury Prize for Best Film at the Berlin Film Festival
- Grand Premio at the Festival dei Popoli in Florence, Italy
- Film Critics Circle of Australia Award for Best Documentary
- Australian Film Institute Best Director Award (now AACTA), for Cunnamulla

Retrospectives of O'Rourke's work have been held at the Amsterdam International Documentary Film Festival, the Berlin Film Festival, the Institute of Contemporary Arts, London in London, the Pacific Film Archive in San Francisco; and in many other cities.

== Filmography ==
Films made by O'Rourke's production company include:

- Yumi Yet – Independence for Papua New Guinea (1976)
- Ileksen – Politics in Papua New Guinea (1978)
- Yap ... How Did you Know We’d Like TV (1980)
- The Shark Callers of Kontu (1982)
- Couldn't Be Fairer (1984)
- Half Life: A Parable for the Nuclear Age (1985)
- Cannibal Tours (1988)
- The Good Woman of Bangkok (1991)
- Cunnamulla (2000)
- Land Mines -- A Love Story (2004)
