= David Parer =

Australian natural history film maker

David Damien Parer AO ACS
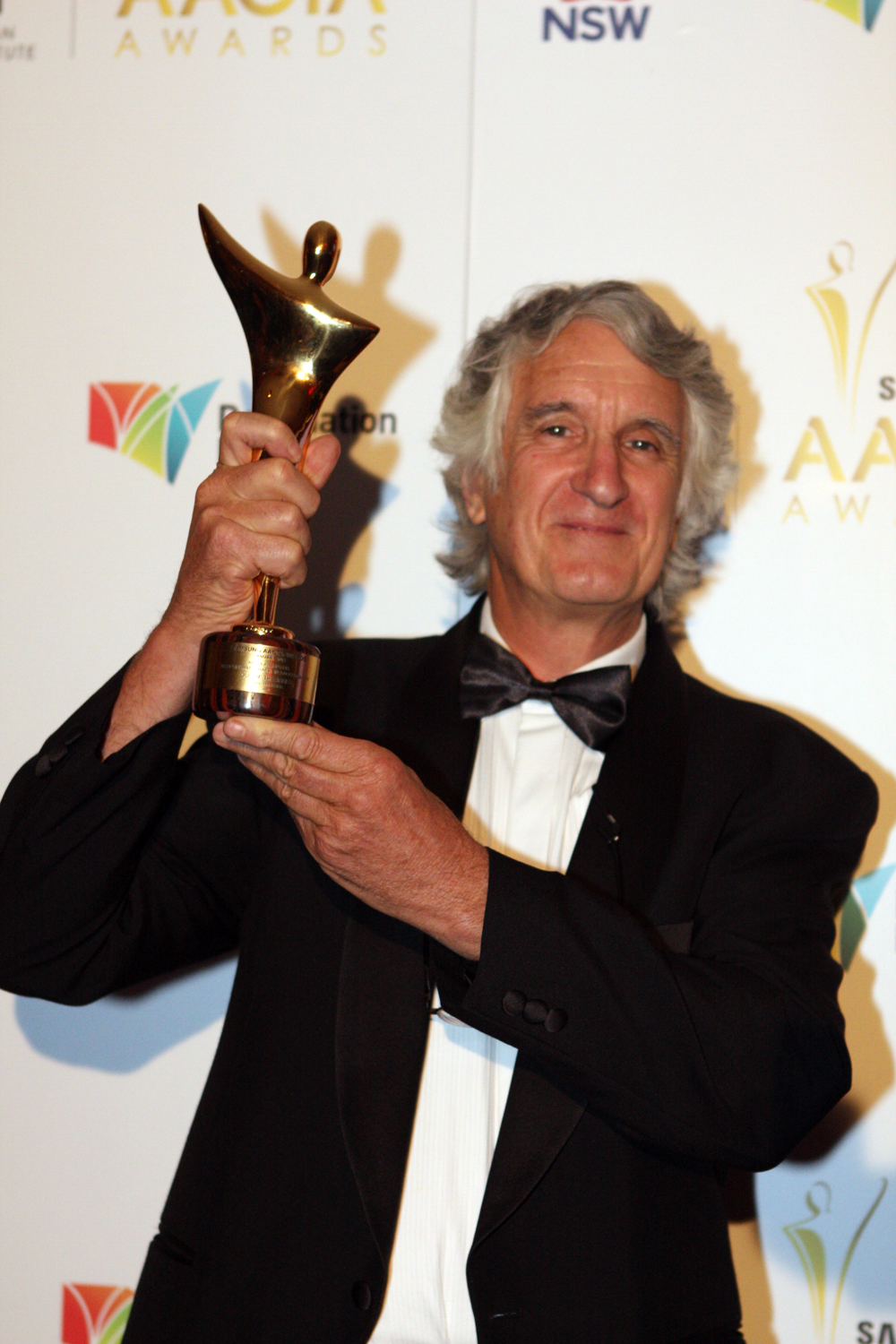
- David Parer, winner of best cinematography in a documentary, AACTA Awards 2011
- Born: David Damien Parer; 29 July 1945 (age 81); Melbourne, Victoria, Australian
- Occupations: cinematographer, natural history film maker
- Notable work: Wolves of the Sea
- Spouse: Elizabeth Parer-Cook
- Children: 1 (Zoe)
- Relatives: Damien Parer (uncle); Amanda Parer (niece); Ray Parer (great uncle)

David Damien Parer AO ACS is an Australian natural history film maker, working in partnership with his wife and sound recordist, Elizabeth Parer-Cook.

Parer was conscripted into the Australian Army to go to the Vietnam War in 1970, but he entered a Masters program to study physics in the Antarctic. Parer spent the summers of 1970 and 1972 in Antarctica studying cosmic rays at Mawson Station. While there he filmed his first documentary. David subsequently joined the Australian Broadcasting Corporation's Natural History Unit making wildlife films, where he met his wife and fellow film maker, Elizabeth Parer-Cook, in 1977. After the Natural History Unit closed in 2007, the Parers continued working as a freelance team.

== Awards ==
The Parers' films have won over 130 Australian and international awards including the Golden Panda at Windscreen twice and three Emmy's.

He was awarded the Golden Panda from Wildscreen (known as the green Oscars) for:

Wolves of the Sea, Gold Panda for Best Film at Windscreen 1994
Mysteries of the Ocean Wanderers, Gold Panda Best Cinematography Windscreen 1994
Dragons of Galapagos, Gold Panda Wildscreen 1998

He has been awarded the AFI award for the best cinematography for a non-feature film four times, for :

Edge of the Cold, 1978
Bird of the Thunder Woman, 1980
The Dragons of Galapagos, 1998
Island of the Vampire Birds, 1999

His other work as a cinematographer and producer includes:

Douglas Mawson: The Survivor, 1983
The Frozen World, 1984
Nature of Australia: A Portrait of the Island Continent: A Separate Creation, 1988
Killer Whales: Wolves of the Sea, 1993
Platypus: World's Strangest Animal, 2003
Terrors of Tasmania, 2004
Australia: Land of Parrots, 2008
Out of the Ashes, 2011

Many of Parer's documentaries have been narrated by noted naturalist David Attenborough.

Parer received an Honorary Doctor of Science from Monash University, Melbourne 17 March 1989.

Parer gained "legend status" at St Patrick's College Old Collegians' Association. He attended college there from 1962 to 1964.

Parer was inducted into the Australian Cinematographers Society's Hall of Fame in 2008. He was appointed an Officer of the Order of Australia in the 2024 Australia Day Honours for "distinguished service to wildlife cinematography, to literature as an author, and to the environment".

== Family ==
His uncle was Academy Award-winning war cinematographer, Damien Peter Parer, who filmed Kokoda Front Line in 1944 in Papua New Guinea.
