= ABC Natural History Unit =

The ABC Natural History Unit was a department of the Australian Broadcasting Corporation, formed out of a desire to consolidate the corporation's growing number of nature-related programs. The unit was based at the ABC's Southbank offices in Melbourne, and won numerous awards. In 2007 the unit was closed, and all nature programming outsourced.

== Notable people ==
- David Parer
