= Black Harvest (1992 film) =

- Directed by: Robin Anderson; Bob Connolly
- Written by: Robin Anderson; Bob Connolly
- Cinematography: Bob Connolly
- Edited by: Ray Thomas
- Release date: 1992
- Running time: 90 mins
- Countries: Australia; Papua New Guinea
- Language: English

Black Harvest is a 1992 Australian-Papua New Guinea documentary directed by Australians Bob Connolly and Robin Anderson. It is the third film in 'The Highlands Trilogy', concluding the series which includes the 1983 film First Contact and the 1989 film Joe Leahy's Neighbours.

The film, made in association with The Institute of Papua New Guinea Studies with assistance from the Australian Broadcasting Corporation, was produced by Arundel Productions, which produced all the films in the Highland Trilogy.

== Synopsis ==
The documentary continued the story from the previous Highland Trilogy Films, exploring the relationship between the half-white, half-native Joe Leahy, who was by then tribal leader, and his neighbours, the Ganiga people. In the documentary, Leahy and the Ganiga jointly own the Kilima plantation, a coffee plantation which by the time of Black Harvest should have been becoming profitable, but a fall in international coffee prices brought dispute as the Ganiga have to work for fewer wages. This happens simultaneously with tribal warfare breaking out.

== Production and release ==
After shooting was completed for Joe Leahy's Neighbours, Anderson and Connolly planned to return to witness the wealth eventuating for the Ganiga people. However, in response to the drop in coffee prices, the film was adapted to respond to events as they unfolded, living on location for a year. During this time they had their then two-year-old daughter Katherine accompanying them. Anderson and Connolly returned to Australia after they were endangered by the tribal war when the rival tribe perceived them as choosing sides after taking a Ganiga to a hospital to remove an arrow from their chest. The Ganiga wouldn't do this by themselves, as the $100 entry fee to a hospital was too high, so Anderson and Connolly paid. After this incident, their house was burnt down, a close friend from the Ganiga was killed and Connolly learnt his name was on a hit-list.

Connolly later in 2005 wrote a book on the shooting of the documentary, called Making ‘Black Harvest’ – Warfare, Filmmaking and Living Dangerously in the Highlands of Papua New Guinea. The book received a 2005 Walkley Award for best non-fiction book. It was based on notes of the experience Anderson took after losing a coin toss which decided who would take the notes.

The film was screened worldwide in many film festivals, such as the Sundance Film Festival, the Singapore International Film Festival, the Sydney Film Festival, Cinema Du Reel and the Yamagata International Documentary Film Festival before going into successful commercial release with its theatrical release. It was broadcast in Australia in 1992 on the ABC. It was critically acclaimed and is often cited as being one of direct cinema's most engaging examples.

== Accolades ==
- Grand Prix at Cinema du Reel in Paris, all 3 films in the Highlands trilogy won the award
- Best Documentary in the Australian Film Institute Awards
- Basil Wright Prize - Best Documentary in the Royal Anthropological Institute
- Best in Category in the San Francisco Film Society Golden Gate Awards
- Best Documentary in the Sydney Film Festival
- Robert Flaherty Grand Prize in the Yamagata International Documentary Festival
- Best Documentary in the Hawaii International Film Festival
- Best Documentary in the Vancouver International Film Festival
- Best Documentary in the Los Angeles Film Critics Association
- Best Documentary in the Film Critics Circle of Australia
- Special Jury Award, Audience Award - Best Documentary, in the Amsterdam Documentary Festival
- Official Selection in the Sundance Film Festival, 1993
