= Bob Connolly =

Australian film director, cinematographer and author

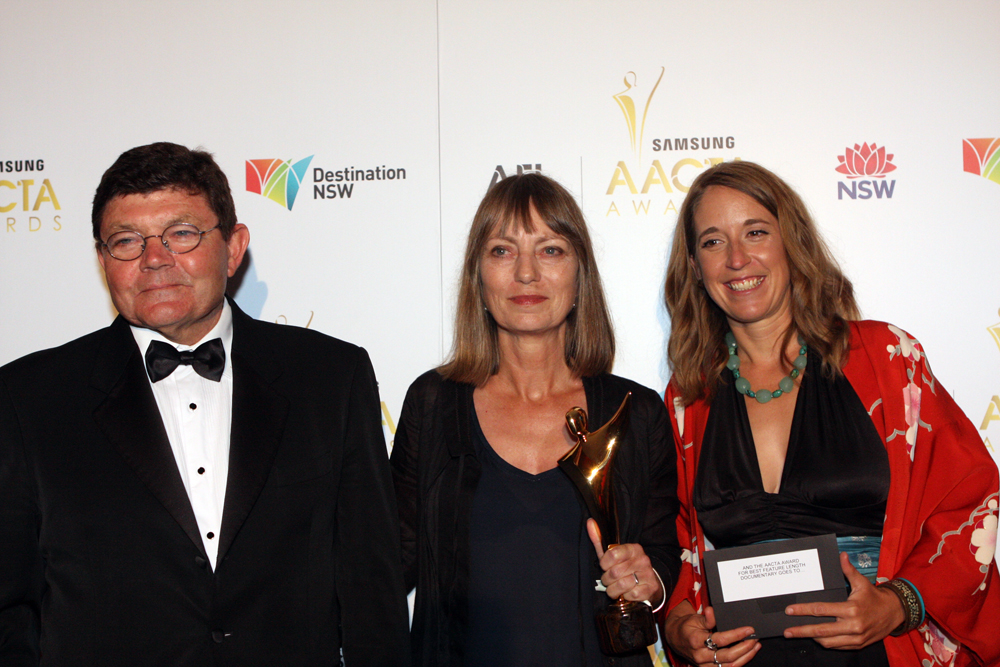
Bob Connolly, Helen Panckhurst and Sophie Raymond at 1st AACTA Awards, 2012

Bob Connolly is an Australian film director, cinematographer and author. He is best known for his documentaries produced over the past 30 years, including The Highlands Trilogy and Rats in the Ranks, most of them with his wife Robin Anderson. Other films include Facing the Music (2001) and Mrs Carey's Concert (2011).

== Early life and education ==
Connolly was educated at Saint Ignatius' College, Riverview in Sydney and attended Sydney University.

== Career ==
He trained as a journalist at the Australian Broadcasting Corporation (ABC), where he worked for almost a decade as a foreign correspondent, current affairs reporter, and documentary filmmaker. While at the ABC he made over 30 documentaries and met his future wife Robin Anderson, then a research assistant.

In 1980 he left the ABC to work independently with Robin Anderson, whom he married. Their first film together was River Journey (1980), Shot on 35mm film during an arduous two-week rafting trip down Tasmania's Franklin River, the film played a major role in the river's subsequent preservation. The river journey also resulted in a book done by Connolly and Anderson,The Fight for the Franklin. For the next 12 years Connolly and Anderson directed their focus on the Highlands of Papua New Guinea. The couple developed an acclaimed professional partnership which included the award-winning Highlands trilogy of documentaries about Papua New Guinea, which saw First Contact receive an Academy Award Nomination.

In 1986, following training in 16mm cinematography and sound recording at the Australian Film, Television and Radio School (AFTRS), they returned to the Highlands to make Joe Leahy's Neighbours (1989), followed by Black Harvest (1992).

In 1996, Rats in the Ranks followed treachery in the inner workings of Sydney inner city Leichhardt Council.

2001 saw the release of Facing the Music, Connolly and Anderson's last film.

Anderson died in 2002, and Connolly initially intended to end his film making career. However, 2011 saw the release of Mrs Carey's Concert. After opening in 70 cinemas in Australia the film became one of the most successful Australian theatrical documentaries of all time.

== Accolades ==
In 1992 Connolly and Anderson won the Byron Kennedy Award, a lifetime achievement award presented as part of the Australian Film Institute Awards (later AACTAs). The judges stated that their "films are not only fine documentaries - they are great human dramas. They will allow no obstacle to divert their single-minded pursuit of excellence".

In 2001, the pair were awarded the Brisbane International Film Festival's Chauvel Award.

Facing the Music won the 2001 AFI Award for Best Documentary and was voted most popular film at the Sydney and Brisbane Film Festivals.

Mrs Carey's Concert won the 2011 AACTA Award for Best Feature Length Documentary and Best Direction in a Documentary.

The three PNG films are still widely distributed around the world as The Highlands Trilogy and have together won more than 30 national and international awards. Connolly's films have also won an Academy Award nomination, and Grand Prix at the Cinéma du Réel Festival.

== Books ==
Connolly's 2005 book Making Black Harvest won the Walkley Book Award for Best Non Fiction. Previous books by Connolly were The Fight for the Franklin (1982) and First Contact, which he co-wrote with Anderson (1987)

== Filmography ==
Major works by Bob Connolly include:

- Franklin River Journey - 1980
- First Contact - 1983
- Joe Leahy's Neighbours - 1988
- Black Harvest - 1992
- Rats in the Ranks - 1996
- Facing the Music - 2001
- Mrs Carey's Concert - 2011

== See also ==
- Cinema of Australia
