= Robin Anderson (filmmaker) =

Australian film director (1948–2002)

Robin Anderson (1950 – 2002) was an Australian documentary filmmaker. Working with her husband Bob Connolly, she is known for their 1996 film Rats in the Ranks. Their first film, First Contact (1983) was nominated for an Academy Award.

== Early life and education ==
Robin Anderson was in born in Perth, Western Australia, in 1950.

After graduating from high school in 1967 she spent a year in Europe, including six months in Paris. Back in Australia she studied economics at the University of Western Australia and graduated three years later with honours.

She then worked in Canberra for the Australian Government for several years, until she won a government scholarship to study for master's degree in sociology at Columbia University in New York City. There she studied under Herbert J. Gans, and during her time in New York she developed a greater interest in cinema and ultimately decided to become a filmmaker.

== Career ==
Anderson returned to Australia after the graduating from Columbia and started to work for the Australian Broadcasting Corporation (ABC). Through her work at ABC she met the documentary filmmaker Bob Connolly, whom she married. Together with her husband she produced five extensively researched documentaries set in Papua New Guinea and Australia, which were positively received and garnered several awards.

Their first documentary First Contact, was about the Australian Leahy brothers and their relation to natives of the remote highlands of Papua New Guinea.

Rats in the Ranks (1996), was "an often hilarious close-up look at small-town political infighting", according to American film critic Janet Maslin.

== Accolades ==
First Contact was nominated for an Academy Award in the category Best Documentary Feature in 1984.

In 1992 Anderson and Connolly won the Byron Kennedy Award, a lifetime achievement award presented as part of the Australian Film Institute Awards (later AACTAs). The judges stated that their "films are not only fine documentaries - they are great human dramas. They will allow no obstacle to divert their single-minded pursuit of excellence".

== Personal life and death ==
Anderson married director Bob Connolly and they had two daughters. She also had a brother, Michael.

Anderson died aged 51 of a rare form of cancer on 8 March 2002, in Sydney. The following day her work appeared at the Sydney Film Festival.

== Filmography ==
- 1982: First Contact
- 1989: Joe Leahy's Neighbours
- 1992: Black Harvest
- 1996: Rats in the Ranks
- 2001: Facing the Music
