= Summer at Mount Hope =

Book by Rosalie Ham

- Cover of first edition
- Author: Rosalie Ham
- Genre: Black comedy, Romance
- Publisher: Duffy & Snellgrove
- Publication date: June 1, 2005
- Publication place: Australia
- Media type: Print (hardcover)
- Pages: 223 pp (first edition)
- ISBN: 978-0975192160

Summer at Mount Hope is a black comedy romantic novel, written by Australian author Rosalie Ham. Like Ham's debut novel The Dressmaker, it is also set in small rural community but in 1890s Australia. The novel centred on protagonist Phoeba Crupp and her struggle with money and male companionship.

Ham also wrote this novel like her debut one while studying her creative writing course at RMIT University. The novel was first published by Duffy & Snellgrove on June 1, 2005. It was later re-published on January 9, 2010.

== Setting and themes ==
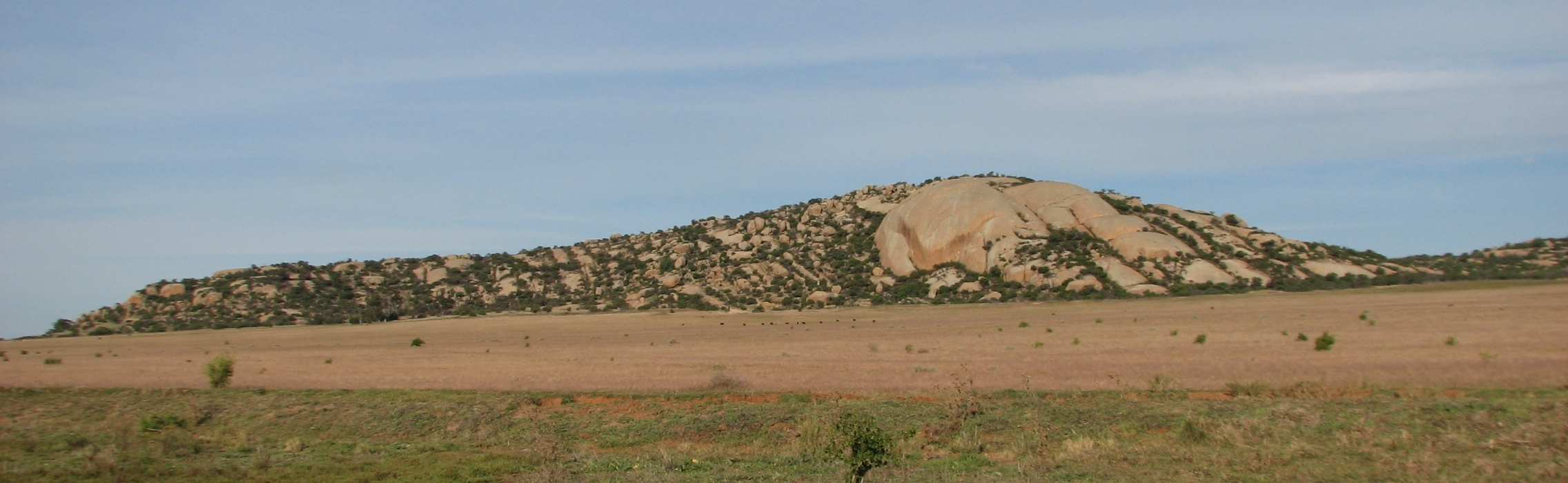
Mount Hope area, where novel is set.

The novel is set in small rural Australian community at Mount Hope located to the north of Pyramid Hill in northern Victoria, Australia. The town is set between Melbourne and Geelong in the year 1894, during the period of drought and depression.

The novel explores a number of themes from pastoralists and squatters, to itinerants and suffragettes campaigning for women's rights, and the advent of new technology. But like Ham's first novel, it also focused on gossip and privations in small communities and their effects.

== Plot ==
In 1894, Phoeba Crupp is an independent woman who does not pay any attention to her mother and sister's concern of getting married, while her father is completely focused on his vineyard. Phoeba is content to spend her time with her best friends Hadley and Henrietta, until she is forced into a world of men and money.

== Characters ==
- Phoeba Crupp : Protagonist of the novel, unconventional, intelligent and independent woman who does not bend to societies rules.
- Hadley Pearson : Phoeba's childhood friend, lives on a neighbouring farm who is in love with her and wants to marry her.
- Lilith Crupp : Phoeba's younger sister, an open flirt whose only ambition is to find a suitable bachelor for marriage.
- Henrietta Pearson : Phoeba's plain and unmarriageable best friend, and Hadley's sister.
- Mrs. Crupp : Phoeba's mother, she detests her husbands travelling for the vineyard and wants to marry her two daughters off.
- Mr. Crupp :Phoeba's father, he is fond of his elder daughter but mostly focused on his vineyard.
- Mrs. Pearson : Hadley and Henrietta's mother.

== Reception ==
The novel was largely compared to Jane Austen's work and especially her 1813 novel Pride and Prejudice by many critics.

The Sydney Morning Herald comparing it to Austin's work said "Summer at Mount Hope bears a passing resemblance to the Jane Austen oeuvre insofar as there are daughters to be married and eligible bachelors to be found." But finally said that "(it) is more unabashed romance set against a backdrop of grapes, dust and drought than a historical document. This is light summer reading; a period-drama with the requisite sunny, fluffy-cloud ending." Gillian Mary Dooley in a review for "Writers’ Radio" a radio program by Radio Adelaide said that "There are so many echoes of Pride and Prejudice in this novel that it’s hard to believe they’re not deliberate." But ultimately concluded that "it is an engaging novel with likeable and plausible characters living in a world created with intelligence, imagination, humour and verve." Peter Pierce of The Bulletin said, "The novel is a delight. Complex beneath its witty surface, and one of the surprising fictional treats of the year." While Liam Davidson in his review titled "Jane Austen Meets Steele Rudd" for The Australian said "While it’s the social and romantic intrigue that carries the story, it’s Ham’s wickedly black humour and finely researched social observation that deliver the real joy of the book."
