= Finley High School =

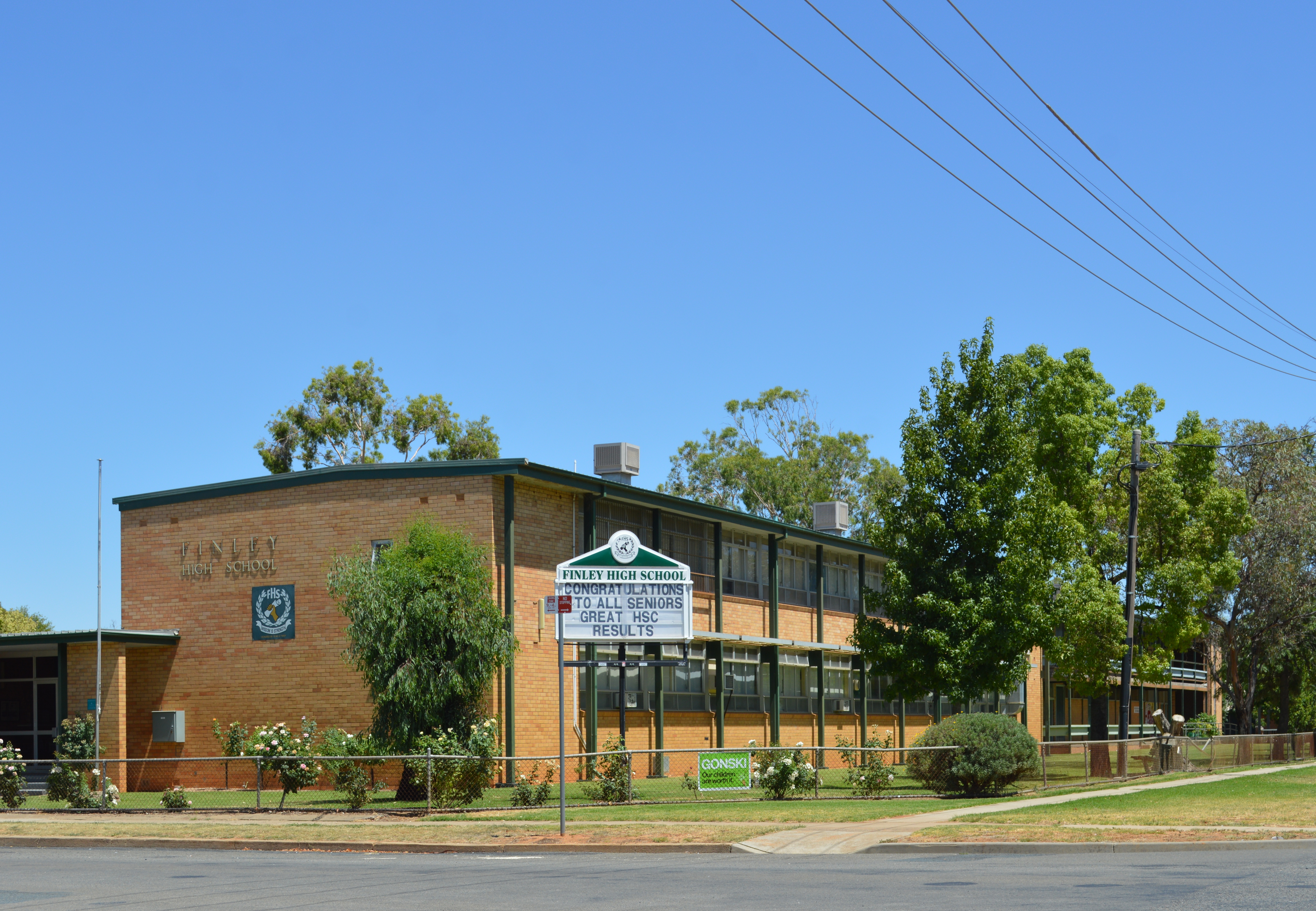
- Facade of Finley High School

Location
- Finley, Riverina, New South Wales; Australia; 35°38′26″S 145°34′22″E

Information
- Type: Government-funded co-educational comprehensive secondary day school
- Motto: Wisdom is Strength
- Established: 1961; 65 years ago
- School district: Albury; Rural South and West
- Educational authority: NSW Department of Education
- Principal: Jeff Ward
- Teaching staff: 38.1 FTE (2018)
- Years: 7–12
- Enrolment: 358 (2018)
- Campus type: Rural
- Colours: Green and white
- Website: finley-h.schools.nsw.gov.au

Finley High School is a government-funded co-educational comprehensive secondary day school, located in Finley in the Riverina region of New South Wales, Australia.

Established in 1961, the school enrolled approximately 360 students in 2018, from Year 7 to Year 12, of whom eight percent identified as Indigenous Australians and four percent were from a language background other than English. The school is operated by the NSW Department of Education; the principal is Jeff Ward.

== Overview ==
The school has an award-winning Show Team, which shows sheep and cattle. They also receive exceptional School Certificate and HSC results. The teaching staff at Finley High School have won many awards, the most recent of which was a Director General's award for excellence in education, awarded to the Principal Phillip Carroll in December 2007 who left at the end of 2009 to teach in Albury.

In 2013 Finley High School introduced the 'Senior College Model' for studying the HSC. This model stretches the HSC over two years, allowing students to do three subjects at double time in Year's Eleven and Twelve. In doing this the Year Eleven and Twelve students merge in classes providing bigger classes and thus more subject options for the students. This HSC model has been implemented in other schools throughout rural NSW; Corowa High School being one.

== Notable alumni ==
- Billy Brownless – Australian rules footballer
- Shane Crawford – Australian rules footballer
- Don Elgin – track and field athlete; represented Australia at the Atlanta 1996, Sydney 2000 and Athens 2004 Paralympics
- Janet English – bass guitarist; member of Spiderbait
- Rosalie Ham – author, best known for The Dressmaker
- Tom Hawkins – Australian rules footballer
- Mark Maher (a.k.a. Kram) – singer-drummer; member of Spiderbait and later, solo artist
- Mark Whiley – Australian rules footballer
- Damian Whitty – guitarist; member of Spiderbait
- David Murphy-Australian rules footballer
- Bernard Toohey- Australian rules footballer

== See also ==
- List of government schools in New South Wales (D-F)
- List of schools in the Riverina
- Education in Australia
