= There Should Be More Dancing =

Book by Rosalie Ham

There Should be More Dancing
- Cover of first edition
- Author: Rosalie Ham
- Genre: Black comedy
- Publisher: Random House Australia
- Publication date: June 29, 2011
- Publication place: Australia
- Media type: Print (hardcover)
- Pages: 292 pp (first edition)
- ISBN: 9781864711905

There Should be More Dancing is a black comedy novel, written by Australian author Rosalie Ham. It is Ham's third novel and focus on the process of aging, the mistakes of life and the vagaries of family. The novel revolves around Margery Blandon, a woman in her seventies and situations she finds herself due to her lifestyle and choices.

The novel was published by Random House Australia on June 29, 2011. It is the first novel of Ham, which was not published by Duffy & Snellgrove, as they have stopped publishing any new work since November 2005.

== Themes and background ==
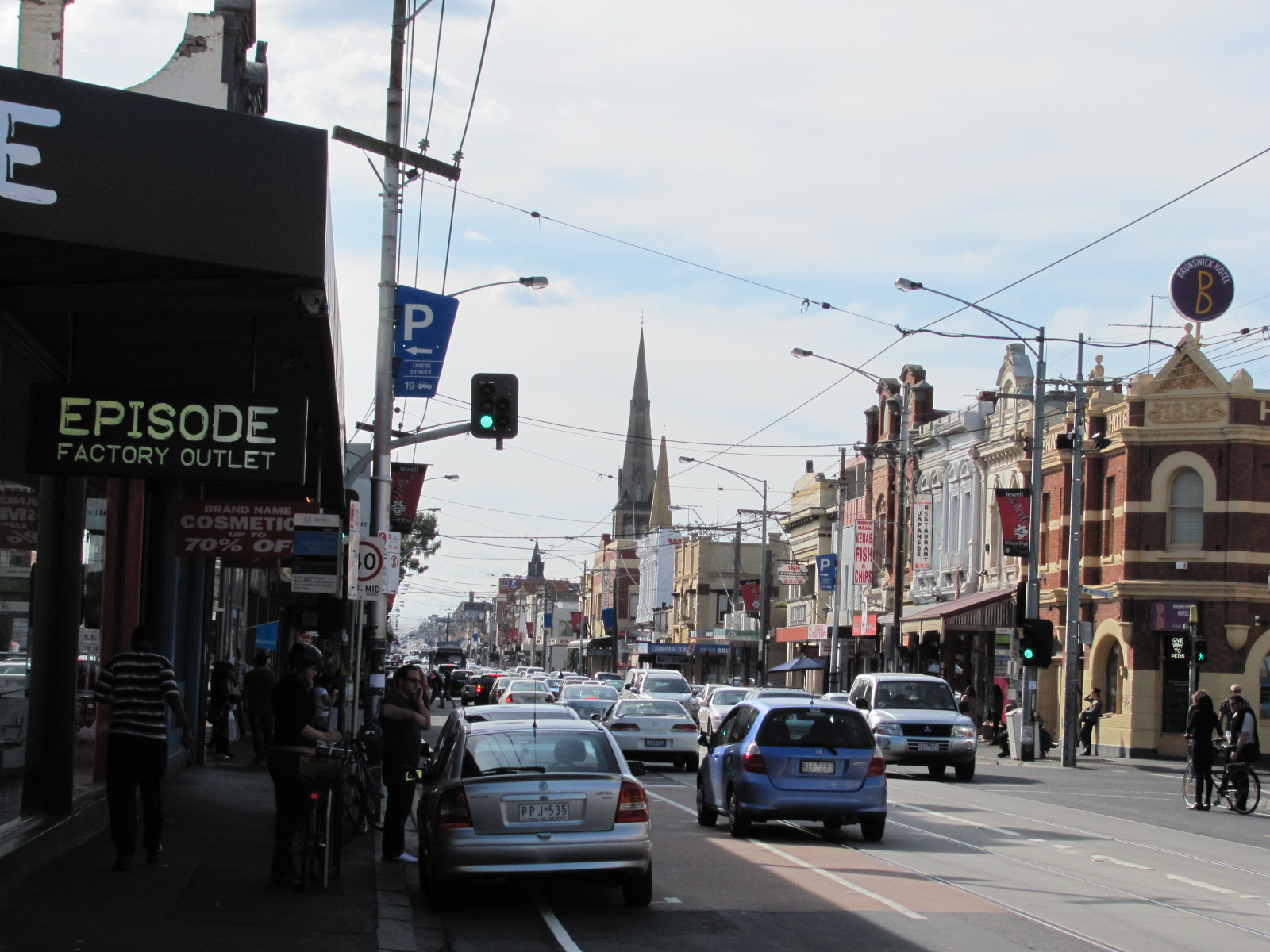
Brunswick, Victoria, where novel is set.

The novel deals with the themes of loyalty, grief and love. It explores life choices of a person and how they affect everyone around. The secret, lies, guilt and betrayal destroy the foundation of relations.

Like Ham's previous two novel, this novel is also set in rural Australia. The setting of the novel is 500 metres away from her home in Brunswick, Victoria and the house her protagonist Margery has in the novel, is real about which Ham said, "I pass it four or five times a week walking my dog.’ It is one of those un-renovated opportunities that the real estate agent son-in-law in the novel paws so covetously: ‘a detached, two-bedroom weatherboard cottage with kitchen and bathroom tacked into the back and outdoor lavatories’. Ham took a photo of the house down the road so she could physically map the landscape her characters inhabited. ‘If it’s true and it’s real, it comes out of your head and down your arms and onto the page. There’s the park and the pub and Sydney Road and Union Square – it’s easy to map their progress. They covered a huge terrain by going not very far."

Talking about the subject matter of novel, Ham said "It’s not a very good premise – a little old lady about to end her life. If you’re going to tackle something like that, you need to do it with humour."

== Plot ==
Margery Blandon is a principled woman in her seventies who has lived her life by the rules. While waiting to die on the 43rd floor of the Tropic Hotel, she reflects on her past to understand where things went wrong.

== Reception ==
The novel got positive reception from critics. Caroline Baum in her review for The Sydney Morning Herald said, "There Should Be More Dancing is a deceptively frivolous title, a wistful phrase with more sagacity than it might suggest: research shows dancing might help delay or prevent the onset of dementia. Its playful message hints at Ham's skill in disguising her informed eloquence on a serious subject behind sparkling, entertaining prose. Senior citizens will wave their walkers in relief and delight: help is at hand." In a review for Steep stairs, Mike Heald called the novel "one of a deep humaneness" and praising Ham said, "Rosalie Ham’s skill allows her to present a world which is both faithful to the reality with which we are familiar, yet also expressive. This takes her work beyond mere mirroring, and makes it an achievement which is both aesthetic, and ethical: an accomplishment of the soul, if you like."
