= Michael Duffy (Australian journalist) =

Australian writer

Michael Duffy is an Australian author and former journalist and broadcaster. He and his wife the artist Alex Snellgrove own the publishing company Duffy & Snellgrove, which published the first books by Peter Robb (Midnight in Sicily), Ashley Hay (The Secret), John Birmingham (He Died with a Felafel in His Hand) and Rosalie Ham (The Dressmaker). Other authors included Les Murray, Mungo MacCallum and John Olsen. The company stopped publishing new titles in 2005.

Duffy presented ABC Radio National's Counterpoint with Paul Comrie-Thomson. Set up to provide some balance to the station's left-wing Late Night Live, Counterpoint went on to rate better than its source of inspiration.

Duffy has written four true crime books and the Sydney crime novels The Tower, The Simple Death and Drive By. He is now writing the Bella Greaves series of crime novels set in the Blue Mountains. The first is The Problem with Murder.

== Books ==
- Crossing the Blue Mountains: journeys through two centuries editor (1996), history
- The Tower (2009), crime fiction
- The Simple Death (2011), crime fiction
- Call Me Cruel: A Story about Murder and the Dangerous Power of Lies (2012), true crime
- Bad: The True Story of the Perish Brothers and Australia's Biggest Ever Murder Investigation (2012), true crime
- Drive By (2013), crime fiction
- Sydney Noir: The golden years co-authored with Nick Hordern, 2017
- World War Noir: Sydney's unpatriotic war, co-authored with Nick Hordern, 2019
- The Problem with Murder (2021), crime fiction
- The Strange Death of Paul Ruel (2022), crime fiction
- Tall Stories, (2023), Blue Mountains local history
