= Rosalie Ham =

Australian author, stage and radio play writer

- Born: 1954 or 1955 (age 71–72); Jerilderie, New South Wales, Australia
- Occupations: Novelist; Literature academic
- Spouse: Ian McLay
- Writing career
- Period: 2000–present
- Genres: Black comedy Gothic fiction
- Website: www.rosalieham.com

Rosalie Ham (born 1954 or 1955) is an Australian author. She is known for her bestselling debut novel, The Dressmaker, which was adapted into a film starring Kate Winslet in the lead role. Her novels are international bestsellers and have been translated into a number of languages. Ham also writes for stage and radio and has written short stories for a number of Australian publications.

== Early life and education ==
Ham was born in 1954 or 1955 and raised in Jerilderie, in rural New South Wales. Talking about her childhood Ham said, "Being a farmer's daughter, I had a fabulous childhood – swimming in creeks and irrigation channels, riding a horse behind a slow moving flock of ewes, rousabouting, cutting wood and setting the fire after school every day in winter, learning to drive aged nine so I could help with Bathurst burr cutting and other slow-moving country driving tasks."

She attended Finley High School for two years. Later she attended St Margaret's School, Melbourne, along with Sue Maslin, and finished her secondary education in 1972.

In 1996, after working as a nurse for 21 years, she graduated from RMIT with an Advanced Diploma of Arts in Professional Writing and Editing, following it up with a Master of Arts in Creative Writing in 2007.

== Early career ==
Ham worked as a nurse for twenty-one years until October 2005, when the nursing home she worked at closed down.

== Writing career ==
=== Stage and radio plays ===
After completing her secondary education, Ham travelled overseas and on her return took admission in Deakin University (then Victoria College). She completed a Bachelor of Education majoring in Drama and Literature in 1989. On the request of her friend, she started writing stage and radio plays. She wrote four plays but soon find out that "(she) didn't want to write plays because I didn't like the theatre thing".

=== "Accidental novelist" ===
Ham has described herself as an "accidental novelist". In 1996, she enrolled in the writing programme of RMIT University but on her arrival she found that it was already full. As she was leaving, novelist Antoni Jach advised her to take a novel course instead. In novel-writing class, she got an assignment of "a 500-word synopsis of her book", which she recalled "I had an idea and started writing it. Then you had to hand in 3,000 words, and then you had to hand in 10,000 words, and I had 30,000 words. It was only three weeks before I realised that this was the best 'accident' that had ever occurred to me." Ham completed this novel in three years. She graduated from RMIT with an Advanced Diploma of Arts in Professional Writing and Editing in 1996, and a Master of Arts in Creative Writing in 2007.

=== Novels ===
Several of Ham's novels are international bestsellers, and have been translated into a number of languages.

On 1 January 2000, Ham's debut novel The Dressmaker was published by Duffy & Snellgrove.

Ham released her second novel, Summer at Mount Hope, in 2005. She also wrote the novel, like her debut The Dressmaker, while studying a creative writing course at RMIT University. The novel drew strong comparison to Jane Austen's works, with The Sydney Morning Herald's review saying: "Ham tries hard to interject some social commentary into the story by including all these elements into her novel but Summer at Mount Hope is more unabashed romance set against a backdrop of grapes, dust and drought than a historical document. This is light summer reading; a period-drama with the requisite sunny, fluffy-cloud ending."

There Should be More Dancing is the third novel written by Ham, released in 2011. The novel revolves around a woman in her seventies, looking back at her life and reflecting on "what went wrong". The Sydney Morning Herald said that, "Ham's skill in disguising her informed eloquence on a serious subject behind sparkling, entertaining prose. Senior citizens will wave their walkers in relief and delight: help is at hand."

The Year of the Farmer was released in 2018.

Released in 2020, The Dressmaker's Secret is a sequel to 2000's The Dressmaker and continues the story of Tilly Dunnage, now an accomplished dressmaker at an atelier in Melbourne, as her past catches up to her.

=== Short stories ===
Ham has written short stories for various Australian publications, including Meanjin, The Age, and The Bulletin.

=== Recurring themes and background ===
All of Ham's novels have been set in small communities of Australia. She has admitted that if she wrote an urban novel, her style of writing would be changed with the change in landscape, which she does not want to do. In all her novels, revenge, gossip, love, betrayal, small communities, isolation, treachery, manipulation and human nature are the common themes.

== Film adaptation ==
Ham initially sold the film rights of The Dressmaker in the mid-2000s and wrote a screenplay, but the project never took off.

Producer Sue Maslin had been at school with Ham and reconnected with the author after the initial project was shelved. Maslin optioned the rights of the novel in 2009 and brought Jocelyn Moorhouse on board to direct and write the screenplay. Kate Winslet and Judy Davis were cast in the roles of Myrtle "Tilly" and Molly Dunnage respectively in August 2013. Ham herself made an appearance as an extra.

The film opened at the number 1 spot at the Australian and New Zealand box offices in 2015 and became the second highest-grossing Australian film of the year and 11th highest-grossing film of all time at the Australian box office. The film won multiple awards as well.

== Other activities ==
As of 2014 Ham was a part-time literature teacher at Trinity College at the University of Melbourne, and RMIT University TAFE.

== Personal life ==
Ham and her husband Ian McLay, a stage builder, were living in Brunswick, Melbourne, in 2005.

== Works ==
- The Dressmaker (2000)
- Summer at Mount Hope (2005)
- There Should be More Dancing (2011)
- The Year of the Farmer (2018)
- The Dressmaker’s Secret (2020)
- Molly (2024)
