= The Dressmaker (2015 film) =

2015 film by Jocelyn Moorhouse

- Theatrical release poster
- Directed by: Jocelyn Moorhouse
- Screenplay by: Jocelyn Moorhouse; P. J. Hogan
- Based on: The Dressmaker by Rosalie Ham
- Produced by: Sue Maslin
- Starring: Kate Winslet; Judy Davis; Liam Hemsworth; Hugo Weaving
- Cinematography: Donald McAlpine
- Edited by: Jill Bilcock
- Music by: David Hirschfelder
- Production companies: Apollo Media; Film Art Media; Screen Australia
- Distributed by: Universal Pictures (International); Amazon Studios; Broad Green Pictures (United States)
- Release dates: 14 September 2015 (TIFF); 29 October 2015 (Australia)
- Running time: 118 minutes
- Countries: Australia; United States; United Kingdom
- Language: English
- Budget: $11.9 million
- Box office: $26 million

The Dressmaker is a 2015 comedy drama film co-written and directed by Jocelyn Moorhouse, based on the 2000 novel by Rosalie Ham. It stars Kate Winslet as femme fatale dressmaker, Myrtle "Tilly" Dunnage, who returns to a small Australian town to take care of her ailing, mentally unstable mother. The film explores the themes of revenge and creativity and was described by Moorhouse as "Clint Eastwood's Unforgiven with a sewing machine". The film was internationally co-financed between Australia and the United States.

The project was first conceived in 2000, and Ham wrote a treatment herself which was not developed. Sue Maslin bought the rights to the novel and hired Moorhouse to direct and write the screenplay. Production took place in Melbourne and across Victoria, Australia in late 2014. The film had its world premiere at 2015 Toronto International Film Festival on 14 September 2015 and had a theatrical release on 29 October 2015 in Australia and New Zealand. It opened at the number 1 spot at the Australian and New Zealand box offices and became the second highest-grossing Australian film of 2015 and sixteenth highest-grossing film of all time at Australian box office.

Despite receiving mixed critical reviews, with praise going towards Winslet's performance and criticism focusing on its uneven tone, The Dressmaker led the 5th AACTA Awards with thirteen nominations. These included Best Film, Best Direction, Best Production Design, Best Original Music Score, Best Sound, Best Editing, Best Cinematography and won Best Lead Actress, Best Supporting Actress, Best Supporting Actor, Best Costume Design and People's Choice Award for Favourite Australian Film.

== Plot ==
In 1926, in the fictitious outback town of Dungatar, State of Victoria, 10-year-old schoolgirl Myrtle Dunnage is blamed for the death of classmate Stewart Pettyman. A sympathetic policeman, Sergeant Horatio Farrat, sends her away. Twenty-five years later, Myrtle, now a couturier-trained dressmaker using the name "Tilly", returns to Dungatar. She remembers nothing of Stewart's death, and her mentally ill mother Molly, living in squalor, does not even remember her.

At the local football final game, the Dungatar players are distracted by Tilly's red couture dress. Teddy McSwiney, one of the players for Dungatar, points this out; Tilly changes into an equally alluring black outfit before the last quarter. When the teams swap ends of the field, the men from Winyerp are the distracted ones, and Dungatar wins.

Tilly agrees to make a dress for Gertrude Pratt for the upcoming footballers dance, in exchange for the truth. Gertrude reveals that she told Stewart where Tilly was hiding that day. At the dance, a transformed Gertrude captures the attention of William Beaumont, and they later become engaged. Impressed, the town's women commission extravagant dresses from Tilly, and Teddy pursues a romantic relationship with her.

Sergeant Farrat confesses to Tilly that Stewart's father Evan, a town councillor, blackmailed him for secretly being a cross-dresser. Tilly and Farrat bond over their shared passion for designer clothing. Evan recruits incompetent Una Pleasance to start a rival dressmaking service, but when Gertrude hires Tilly to create her wedding dress, the townspeople return to Tilly.

Bribed with a boa, Farrat lets Tilly read the witness statement given by her former schoolteacher, Beulah Harridiene. She confronts Beulah, who admits that she was not even there. Tilly tells Farrat this at Gertrude's wedding reception, but he remains reluctantly convinced that she killed Stewart. Everyone else had an alibi. He also reveals that Evan is Tilly's father. Tilly runs away, and Teddy follows after soothing his developmentally disabled brother, Barney, who screams hysterically that Tilly "moved" when Stewart died.

At the schoolhouse, Teddy helps Tilly remember how Stewart died. He had threatened to murder her mother if she did not stand against a wall. Stewart charged head-down at her, but she moved aside, so he broke his neck. Barney witnessed this from the town silo, but was afraid people would think he was lying.

Tilly and Teddy make love in his caravan and plan to marry. They sit atop the silo, and Teddy shows that he does not believe in her curse by jumping inside. He sinks into sorghum grain and asphyxiates. Molly tells the townswomen that Teddy died trying to prove that his love was stronger than their hate. Molly tends to the grieving Tilly, and tells her that Evan had Tilly sent away to hurt Molly. She encourages Tilly to use her art against the townspeople. Molly suffers a stroke and dies.

While Tilly and Farrat hold a wake, Beulah snoops around the house. Tilly drunkenly objects to the music, and inadvertently injures Beulah when she throws the record player off the verandah in the dark. Sergeant Farrat sends Beulah to a sanatorium in Melbourne. Percival Almanac, the sadistic town chemist, drowns in a pond behind his house. His wife Irma is under the influence of extra-strong hash brownies Molly baked to ease her arthritis pain. Sergeant Farrat takes the blame for the hashish and transvestism and is arrested.

Tilly reveals the truth about Evan to his wife Marigold, who confronts him. When he threatens to commit her, she cuts his Achilles tendons and leaves him to bleed to death. Meanwhile, at a competitive Eisteddfod in Winyerp, the townspeople discover that Tilly created Winyerp's charming Mikado costumes. Their own disordered production of Macbeth is doomed due to the loss of Evan and Marigold.

Declaring that she is no longer cursed, Tilly sets fire to her house and sends a paraffin-soaked bolt of red fabric rolling down the hill into town. The townspeople return to find Dungatar a ruin. Tilly is on the train headed to Paris, via Melbourne.

== Cast ==
- Kate Winslet as Myrtle 'Tilly' Dunnage
  - Darcey Wilson as young Myrtle
- Judy Davis as Molly Dunnage
  - Lucy Moir as young Molly
- Liam Hemsworth as Teddy McSwiney
- Hugo Weaving as Sergeant Horatio Farrat
- Sarah Snook as Gertrude 'Trudy' Pratt
  - Olivia Sprague as young Gertrude
- Sacha Horler as Una Pleasance
- Caroline Goodall as Elsbeth Beaumont
- James Mackay as William Beaumont
- Rebecca Gibney as Muriel Pratt
- Shane Bourne as Evan Pettyman
- Alison Whyte as Marigold Pettyman
- Barry Otto as Percival Almanac
- Julia Blake as Irma Almanac
- Kerry Fox as Beulah Harridiene
- Gyton Grantley as Barney McSwiney
  - Alex de Vos as Young Barney
- Genevieve Lemon as Mae McSwiney
- Shane Jacobson as Alvin Pratt
- Tracy Harvey as Lois Pickett
- Terry Norris as Septimus Crescent
- Amanda Woodhams as Nancy Pickett
  - Grace Rosebirch as Young Nancy
- Stan Leman as Edward McSwiney
- Rory Potter as Stewart Pettyman
- Hayley Magnus as Prudence Harridiene
- Mark Leonard Winter as Reginald Blood
- Simon Maiden as Photographer
- Fletcher Humphrys as Ticket Collector

== Production ==
=== Development ===
Rosalie Ham sold the rights of the novel for film in mid 2000s. She said in an interview, "I had ten offers on the table within weeks of the book coming out. I selected a producer who seemed passionate about the book and determined to make it happen" and even wrote a screenplay for the film but somehow the project never took off. While missing out on the rights to begin with, producer Sue Maslin reconnected with the author, whom she had not seen for 30 years since they were at boarding school together. After the initial project was shelved, Maslin optioned the rights of the novel in 2009 and brought Moorhouse on board to direct and write the screenplay for the film. Maslin said, "She (Moorhouse) was living in Los Angeles and I flew there twice to talk to her (about coming back to Australia to make the film). It goes back to what she did with Proof, where every scene was on a knife edge between comedy and tragedy. You don't know whether to laugh or cry." Screen Australia, Film Victoria, Ingenious Media, White Hot Productions, Fulcrum Media Finance, Motion Picture Lightning, and Soundfirm provided the additional investment for the film.

Moorhouse came on board for the project, saying, "I've waited years to make this movie. It's about my favourite subjects: revenge, love and creativity. I'm deeply grateful to have such extraordinary actors working on this with me." Moorhouse's husband, film director P. J. Hogan, served as the script editor for the project.

=== Casting ===
Main cast of the film

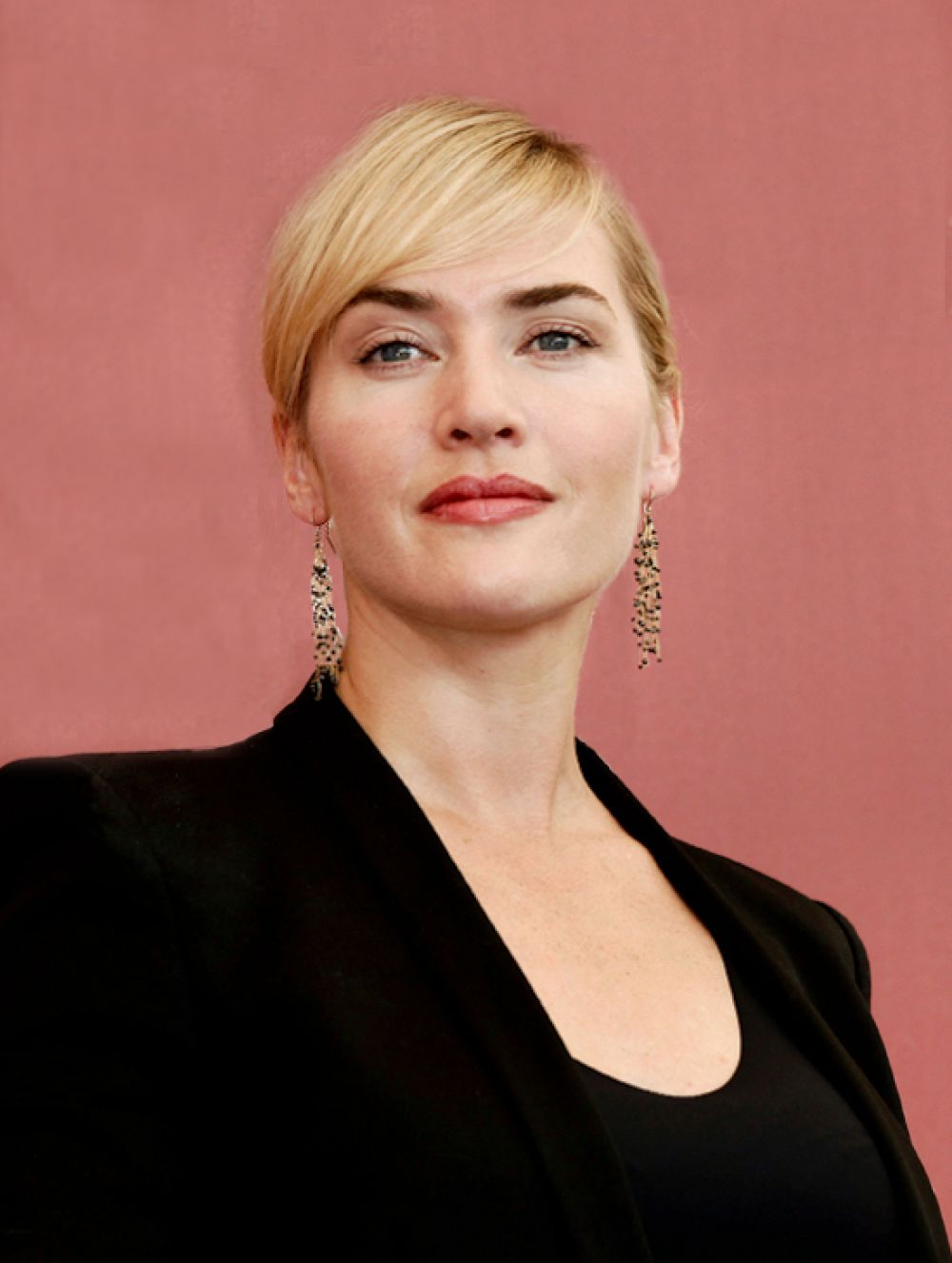
Kate Winslet

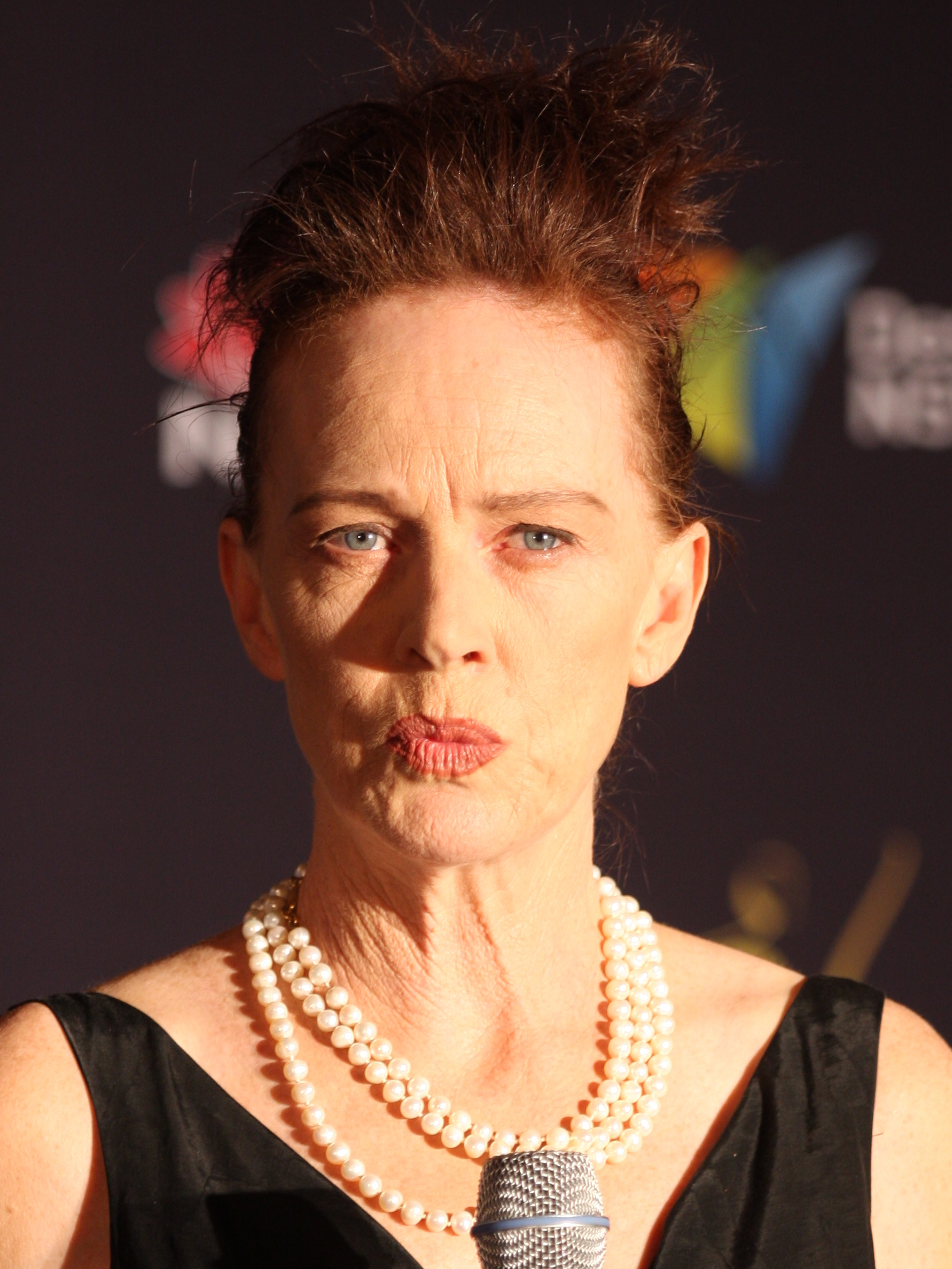
Judy Davis

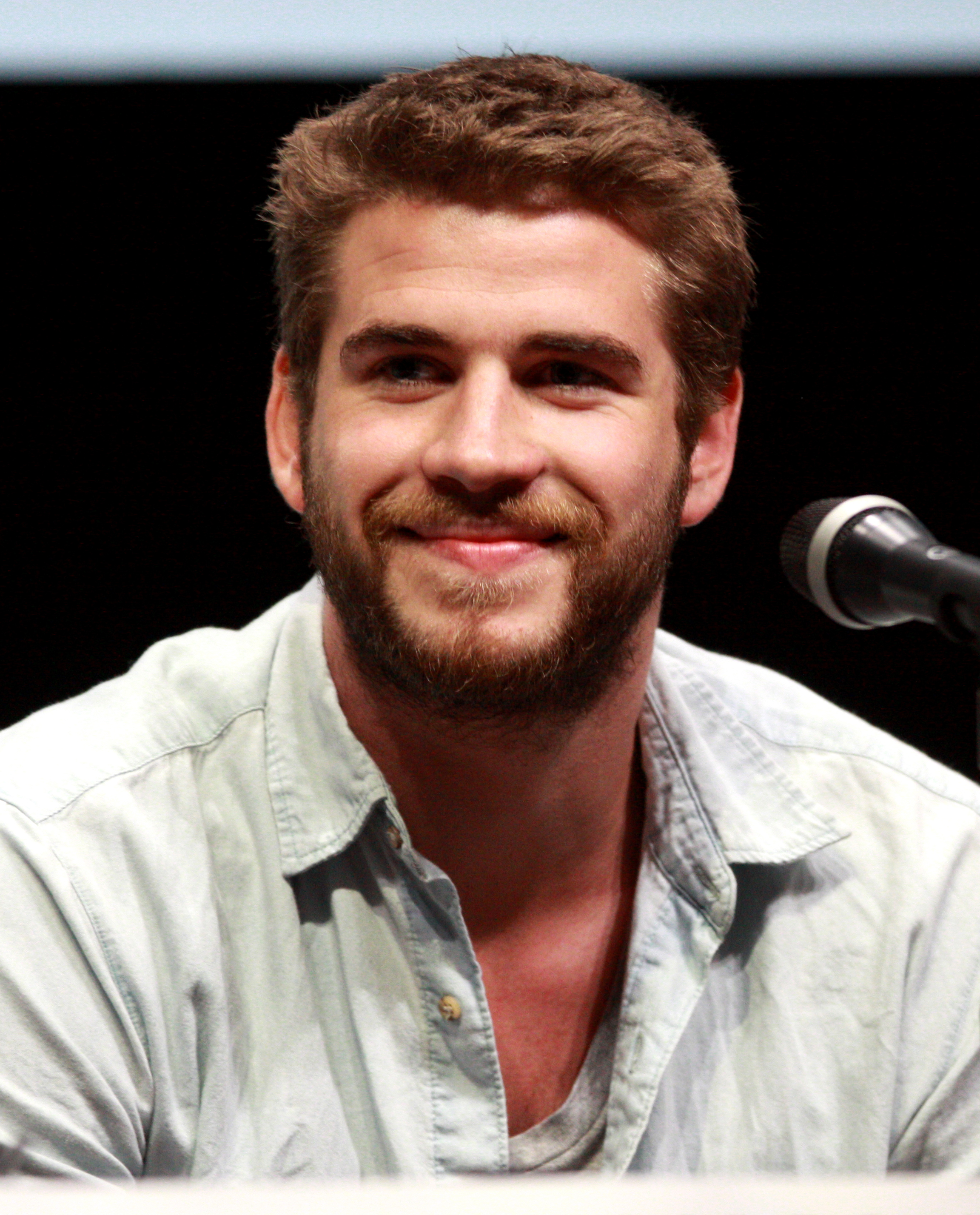
Liam Hemsworth

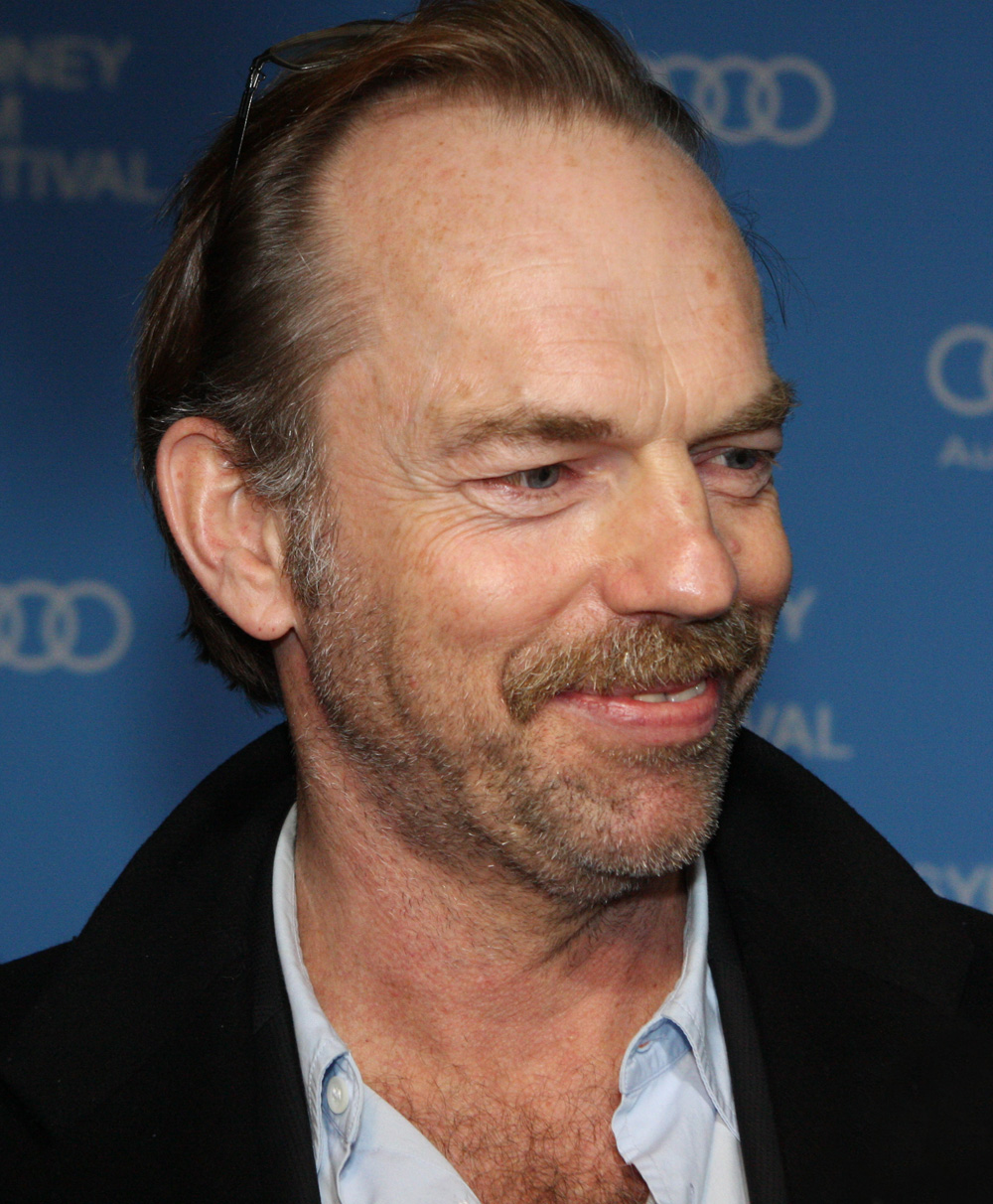
Hugo Weaving

Kate Winslet and Judy Davis joined the cast of the film as Myrtle "Tilly" and Molly Dunnage respectively in August 2013. Maslin had Winslet and Davis in mind from the start of the project for the roles but knew that securing both of them would not be easy, saying, "Kate gets sent hundreds of scripts a year, and chooses two or three. She fell in love with Tilly, so it was all down to Jocelyn and her beautiful script" and "I've been trying to get Judy to work with me for about 20 years, I always offer her things and so does my husband. So when I read this character I thought, if only I could get Judy to do this. I was actually scared to send her the script, I kept doing more and more drafts so what she got was the best possible version. I was nervous, but I needn't have been because she seemed to respond to the character pretty quickly."

Liam Hemsworth as Teddy McSwiney, Isla Fisher as Gertrude Pratt and Elizabeth Debicki as Una joined the cast in early May 2014. Speaking about the casting, Moorhouse said, "Kate is perfect for Tilly, she’s beautiful, intelligent, and deeply mysterious on screen. Judy Davis is amongst the great contemporary actresses and she will bring powerful wit and charm to the role of Molly. Liam Hemsworth is a laid back, genuine charmer who’s also tall, dark and movie-star handsome." In early October 2014, Hugo Weaving joined the cast as Sergeant Farrat, a secret cross-dressing police officer of Dungatar.

On 10 October 2014, it was announced that Debicki had dropped out of the film to play the lead in The Kettering Incident and had been replaced by Sacha Horler. Fisher also left the project due to pregnancy, and was replaced by Sarah Snook. Additional cast members were announced including Caroline Goodall, Shane Bourne, Kerry Fox, Rebecca Gibney, Shane Jacobson, Alison Whyte and Genevieve Lemon.

Ham encouraged the casting of extras from her hometown of Jerilderie, New South Wales, Australia, saying, "It was important to me that Jerilderie locals had a chance to be in the movie." The last portion of filming took place in the Wimmera and more than 100 locals participated as extras. For the players in football match scene in the film, casting director Charlotte Seymour hired most of the extras from Wimmera's Laharum Football Netball Club. Singer Lanie Lane, who recorded songs for the soundtrack album of the film, also appears as an extra in the film. Ham herself makes an appearance as an extra in the film.

=== Pre-production ===
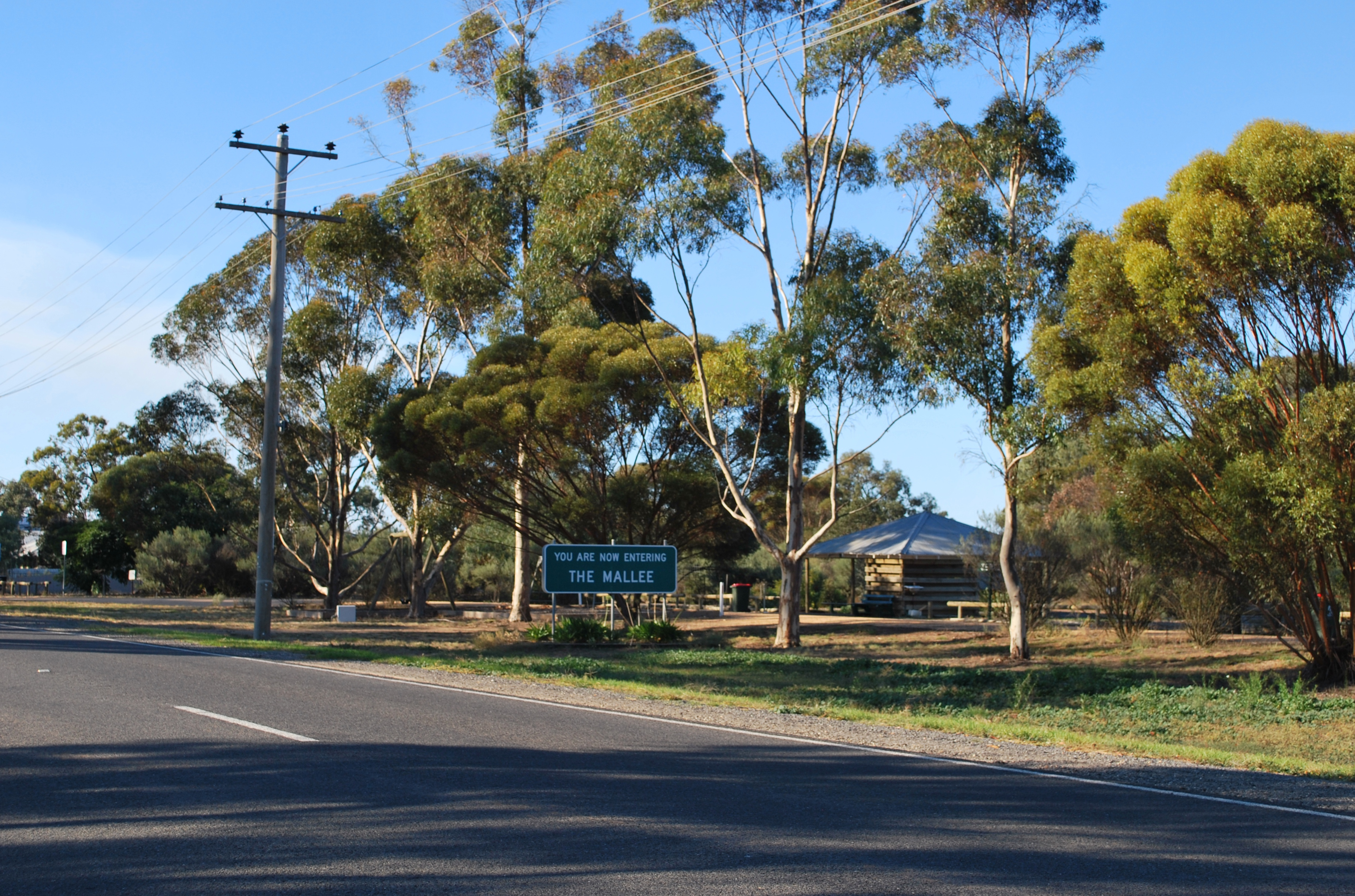
Victoria's Wimmera-Mallee, place of setting for fictional town Dungatar

Production was initially planned to start in early 2014, but due to Winslet's pregnancy it was delayed to late 2014. Pre-production finally began in September 2014, with the construction of fictional town Dungatar started on 16 September 2014 at Mount Rothwell, one hour out of Melbourne. According to Maslin, after looking at many small towns around regional Victoria with Ham and Moorhouse, they decided to set the location of Dungatar "in the wheat-growing area of Victoria's Wimmera-Mallee". Maslin added, "Rosalie is definite about it being in a wheatbelt but on a hill. We drove around Victoria, NSW and into South Australia for three years looking but never found all the elements. Then one day the location department at Film Victoria rang up and suggested the back of the You Yangs near Geelong, where Heath Ledger had filmed Ned Kelly. It had a granite outcrop and a landscape of dead trees. Our DOP Don McAlpine took one look and said ‘We have to shoot here’."

The Emmy Award-nominated Marion Boyce was announced as the costume designer for the film. Maslin expressed excitement about working with Boyce on a film in which dressmaking plays an important role. Sophie Theallet was also asked to design two couture gowns for Winslet for the film. In October 2014, Margot Wilson came on board as the costume designer for Tilly Dunnage's wardrobe worn by Winslet in the film. Additional retro clothes and accessories were provided by a shop named Retropolitan, located in West Annapolis, United States.

Winslet bought a sewing machine and learnt to sew for the film, she explained that "the one we used in the film, it was mine, the one that I had learnt on, and I took it over to Australia so that we could use it in the film." She used the Singer Sewing Machine Singer 201K2 in the film.

=== Filming ===
Filming locations in Australia

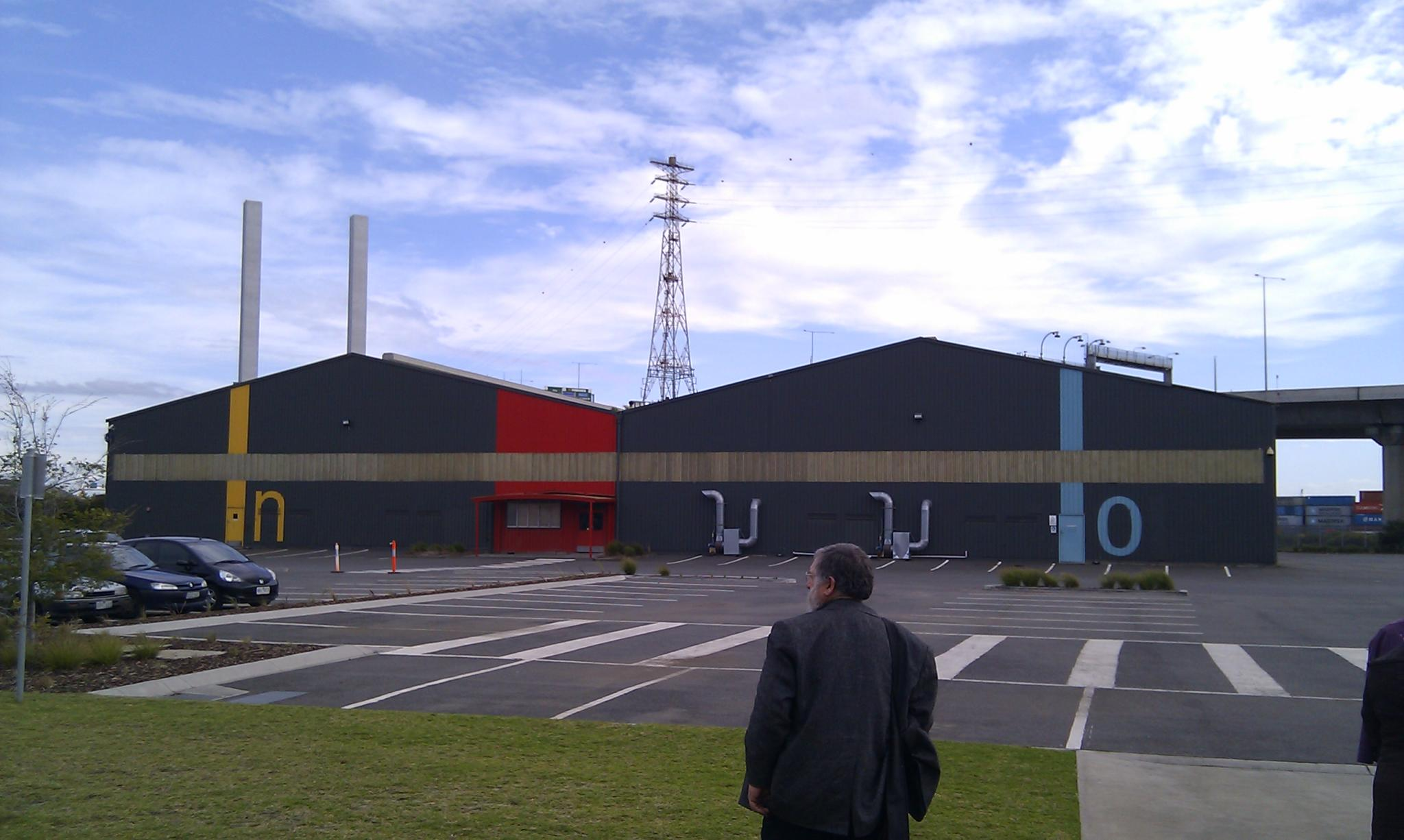
Docklands Studios Melbourne

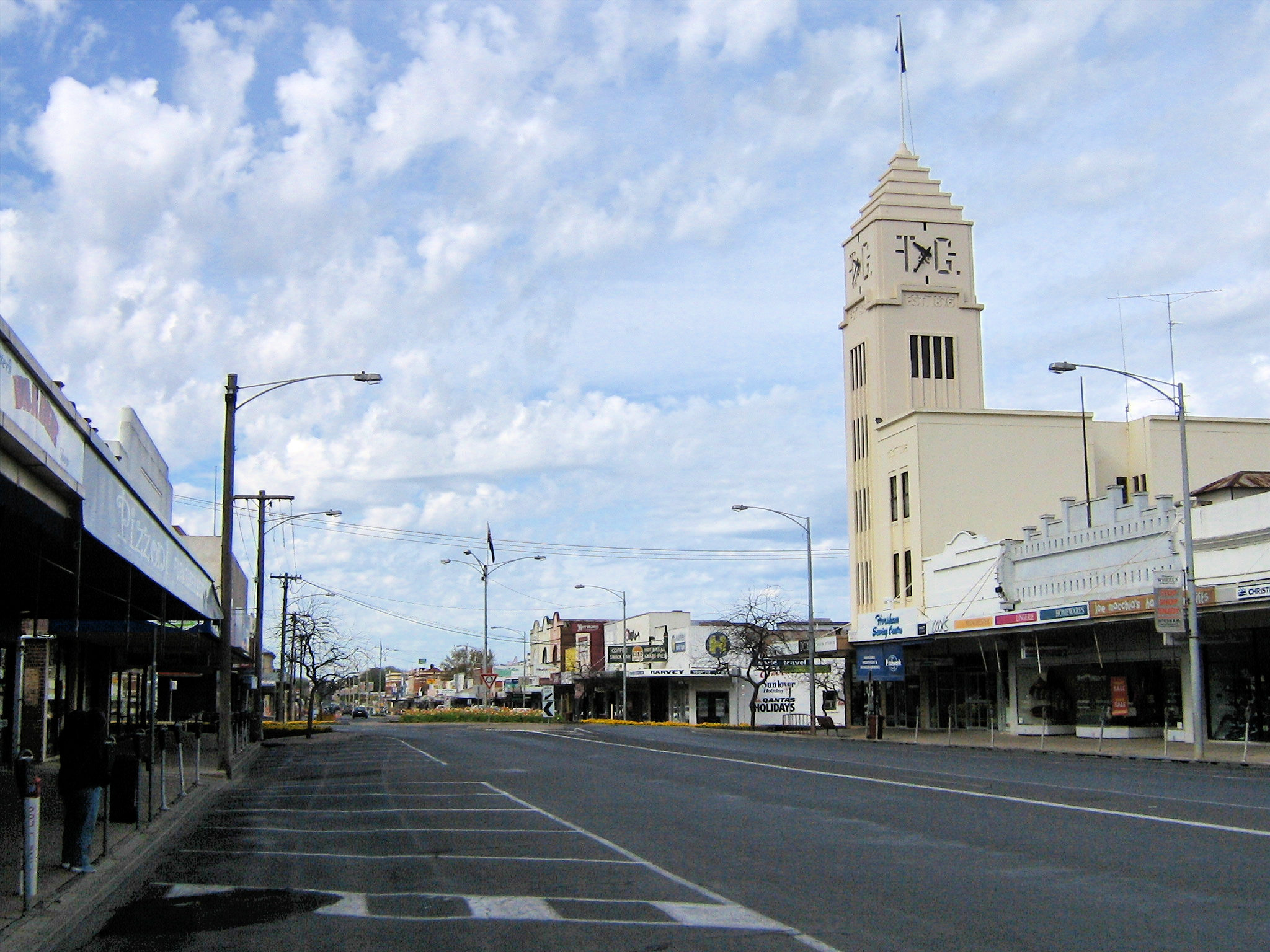
Horsham, Victoria (Main Street)

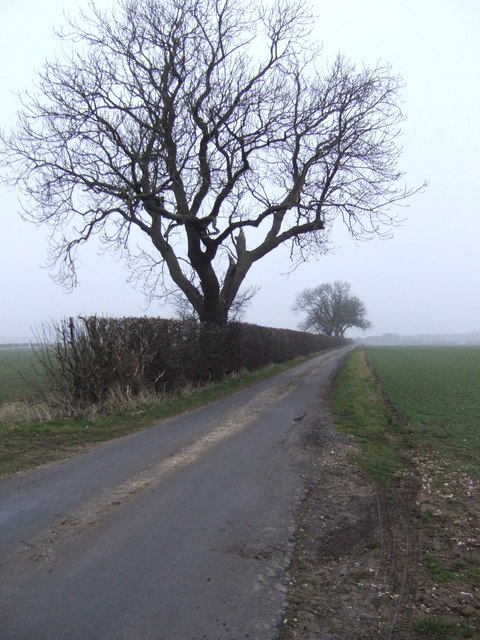
Mount Rothwell

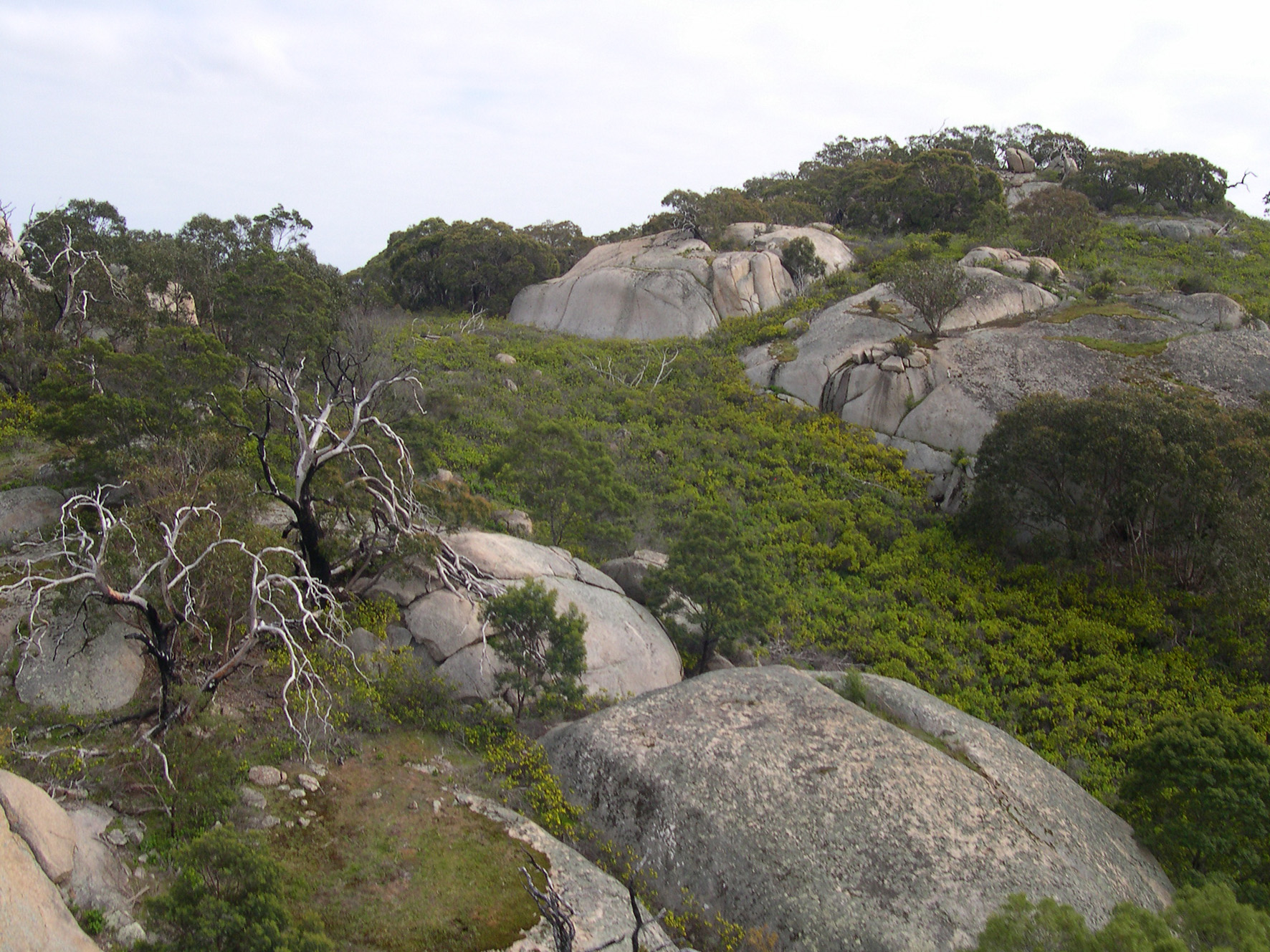
You Yangs

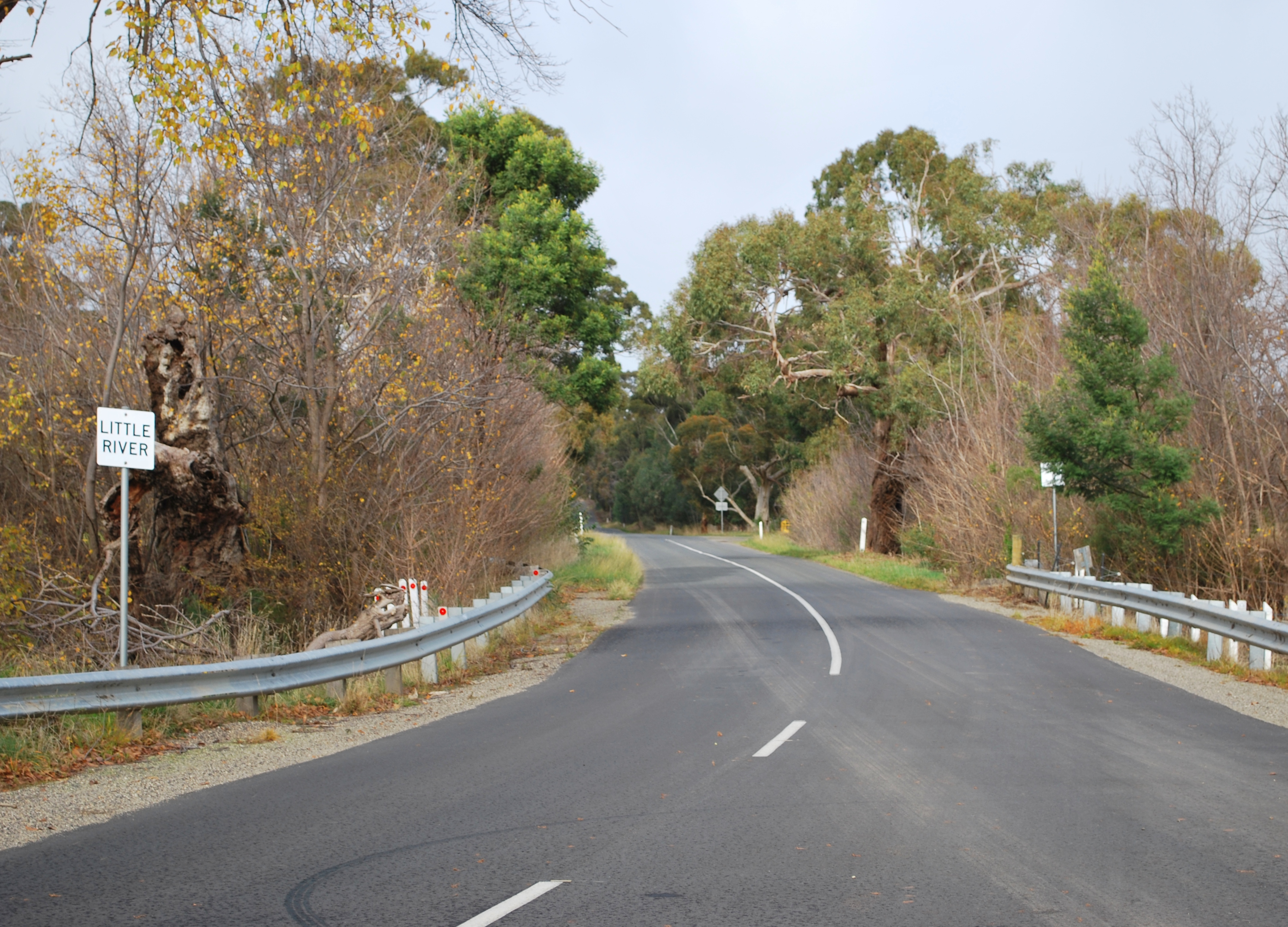
Little River, Victoria

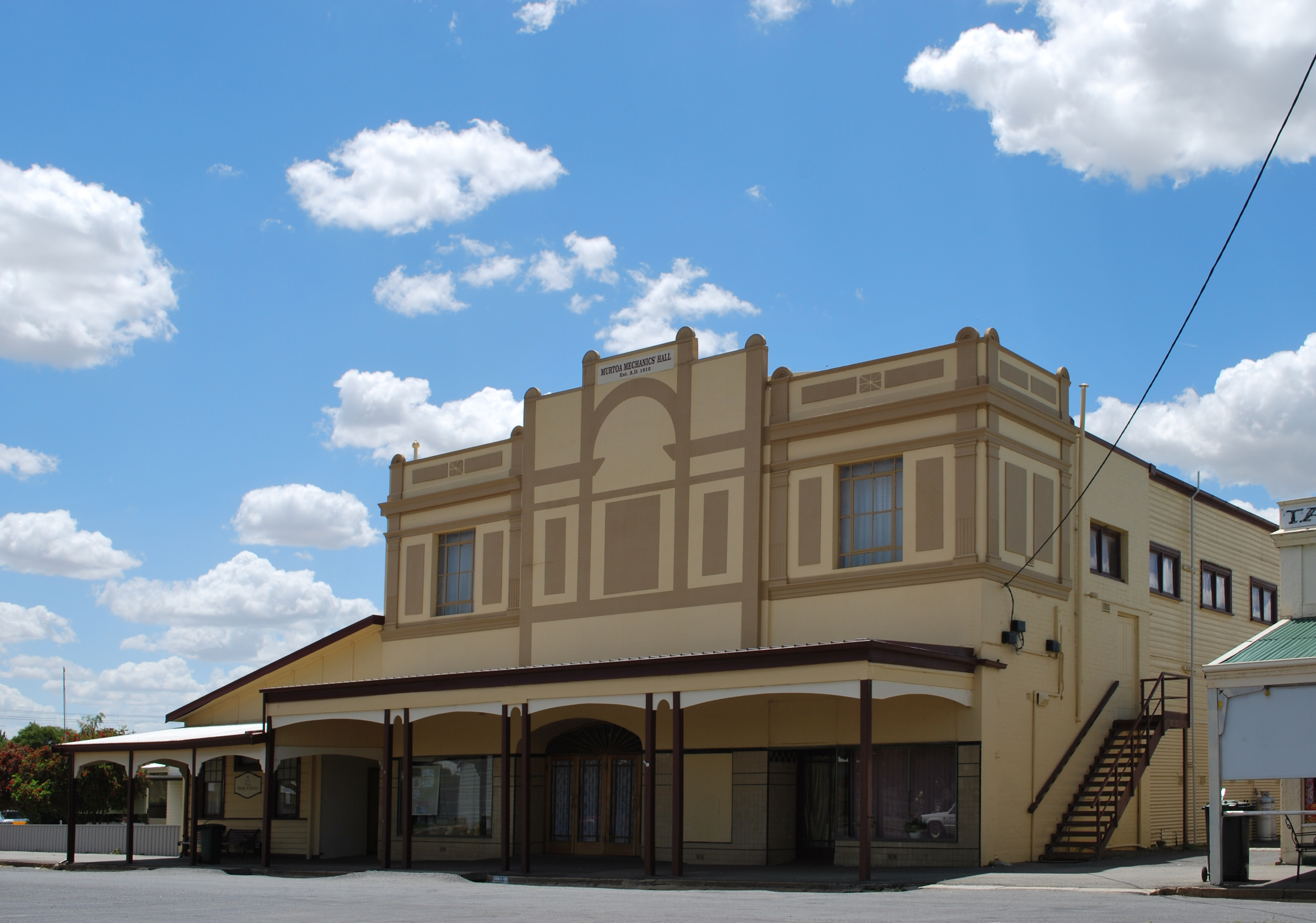
Murtoa, Victoria (Murtoa Hall)

Principal photography started on 17 October 2014 in Melbourne, Australia, at Docklands Studios and finished on 13 December 2014. Filming also took place at different towns in Victoria, Australia, including Mount Rothwell, Little River and Horsham and also in the Wimmera region.

Interior scenes were filmed at the Docklands Studios, where an artificial silo, and part of Dungatar town, including Molly Dunnage's house, were constructed on the sound stage. On 20 October 2014, filming took place at Docklands Studios with Winslet and Davis. On 5 November 2014, filming took place at Muckleford, Victoria railway station, which was transformed into Dungatar's railway station. In the middle of November 2014, scenes were shot at Mount Rothwell, just north of the You Yangs near Geelong. Later that month, scenes were filmed with an emu named "Elvis", courtesy of the Mount Rothwell Biodiversity Interpretation Centre.

Hemsworth only joined the filming in late November 2014 because of his prior commitment to the promotion of The Hunger Games: Mockingjay – Part 1. On 2 December 2014, he, along with Gyton Grantley, shot scenes at Little River, just west of the You Yangs. Filming took place in different areas of Yarraville, a Melbourne suburb, including Ballarat Street, and around the Sun Theatre and the Sun Bookshop, on 4 December 2014. On 5 December 2014, filming took place in Melbourne with Winslet, Hemsworth and Hugo Weaving. A scene was also shot in a hall in the Melbourne suburb of Williamstown, which served as fictional Dungatar.

In the second week of December 2014, Maslin, along with a crew of 120 people, moved to Victoria's Wimmera region for further filming. Scenes were shot in different parts of the Wimmera, including Sailors' Home Hall at Murra Warra, the grain silo and cemetery at Jung, Laharum Homestead and Murtoa Hall. Longerenong Homestead, near Horsham, was used for wedding reception scenes and Jung Recreation Reserve for football-match scenes. On 10 December 2014, football-match scenes were filmed with Winslet, Hemsworth, and Davis. On 12 December 2014, filming took place at Murtoa, which served as the fictional town of Winyerp in Ham's novel. Filming concluded with the shooting of wedding-reception scenes at Longerenong Homestead.

=== Post-production ===
Post-production started in mid-December 2014, and took place at Soundfirm Melbourne, with Moorhouse, editor Jill Bilcock and music composer David Hirschfelder and was finished by 30 June 2015. Filming had included the use of greenscreen shots to which visual effects were added in post-production.

== Music ==
The Dressmaker: Original Motion Picture Soundtrack

Film score Soundtrack album by various artists
- Released: 15 November 2015
- Genres: Spaghetti Western, electronic
- Length: 59:32
- Producer: David Hirschfelder

David Hirschfelder chronology
The Water Diviner (2015)	The Dressmaker: Original Motion Picture Soundtrack (2015)	A Street Cat Named Bob (2016)

David Hirschfelder composed the score of the film. It is Hirschfelder's first collaboration with Moorhouse and second with Maslin, with whom he previously worked on Ann Turner's 2006 mystery drama film Irresistible. The soundtrack album was released digitally on 15 November 2015 by Hirschfelder's label. It also contains songs recorded by Australian singer and songwriter Lanie Lane.

No.	Title	Length
1.	"The Dressmaker Opening Titles"	3:14
2.	"The Murderess Is Back!"	2:38
3.	"The Black Dress"	1:33
4.	"Why Did You Come Back?"	3:31
5.	"You Know Exactly What Day"	0:42
6.	"Need a Lift?"	2:20
7.	"You Never Came Back for Me"	1:30
8.	"Sgt. Farrat’s Frenzy"	1:32
9.	"You Don’t Scare Me"	0:43
10.	"Una Arrives in Dungatar"	2:48
11.	"Una’s Salon"	0:50
12.	"They Were Starting to Like Me"	2:16
13.	"Gert’s Wedding Dress Disaster"	1:39
14.	"Tilly Understands My Body Shape"	0:36
15.	"Will You Be My Best Man?"	1:08
16.	"You Moved!"	6:30
17.	"A Better Place"	1:37
18.	"My Beautiful Boy"	4:58
19.	"You’re Not the Cursed One"	2:00
20.	"All Settled Then"	1:53
21.	"Goodbye Old Friend"	2:12
22.	"Goodbye Almanac, Farewell Sgt. Farrat"	3:38
23.	"Goodbye Pettyman"	2:19
24.	"Burning Down Dungatar"	2:08
25.	"The Dressmaker Closing Credits"	5:17
Total length:		59:32

== Distribution ==
=== Marketing and promotion ===
The first image of Winslet from the film was revealed on 17 December 2014. The first official trailer for the film along with a still from the film featuring Winslet and Liam Hemsworth was released on 13 July 2015.

The Dressmaker (novel) was republished as a tie-in-edition with film, featuring a new book cover and released by Penguin Books on 11 August 2015, before the release of the film.

=== Releases ===
The film was premiered at the 2015 Toronto International Film Festival on 14 September 2015. It was screened at Busan International Film Festival on 2 October 2015, followed by its screening at the 2015 Adelaide Film Festival on 16 October 2015. It screened at Mill Valley Film Festival on 17 October 2015 where it won the Audience Favourite Silver Award. It had its Australian premiere in Melbourne on 18 October 2015.

Universal Studios acquired the distribution rights of the film internationally and in Australia and New Zealand and initially planned to release the film on 1 October 2015. It was later changed to 29 October 2015. Energía Entusiasta released the film in Argentina on 19 November 2015. In UK, it had a theatrical release on 20 November 2015. Amazon Studios acquired U.S. distribution rights to the film. The film was released in the United States in a limited release on 23 September 2016, with Broad Green Pictures co-distributing with Amazon.

=== Home media ===
The film was released on DVD and Blu-ray on 22 February 2016 in Australia. It was released on 14 March 2016 in the UK.

== Reception ==
=== Box office ===
As of 13 November 2016, The Dressmaker has grossed over US$24.11 million (AUS$32.14 million), against a budget of US$11.9 million (AUS$17 million).

The film opened at the number 1 position at Australian box office and earned US$697,791.12 (AUS $976,000) on its first day. It opened in 384 theatres and grossed US$5,862.59 (AUS $8,200) per theatre, and made US$2.26 million (AUS $3.16 million) including previews, with total earning of over US$2.56 million (AUS $3.58 million) in its opening weekend in Australia. Similarly it opened to number 1 position in New Zealand and grossed over US$220,329 (NZ $334,818) in three days. In its second week, it retained its no. 1 position at the box office with US$5.8 million (AUS $8.23) in Australia and US$510,000 (NZ $333264.60) in New Zealand.

It beat the record of Russell Crowe's The Water Diviner (2014) for the biggest Australian film opening at the box office and became the second highest-grossing Australian film of 2015 after Mad Max: Fury Road and eleventh highest-grossing film of all time at the Australian box office.

=== Critical response ===
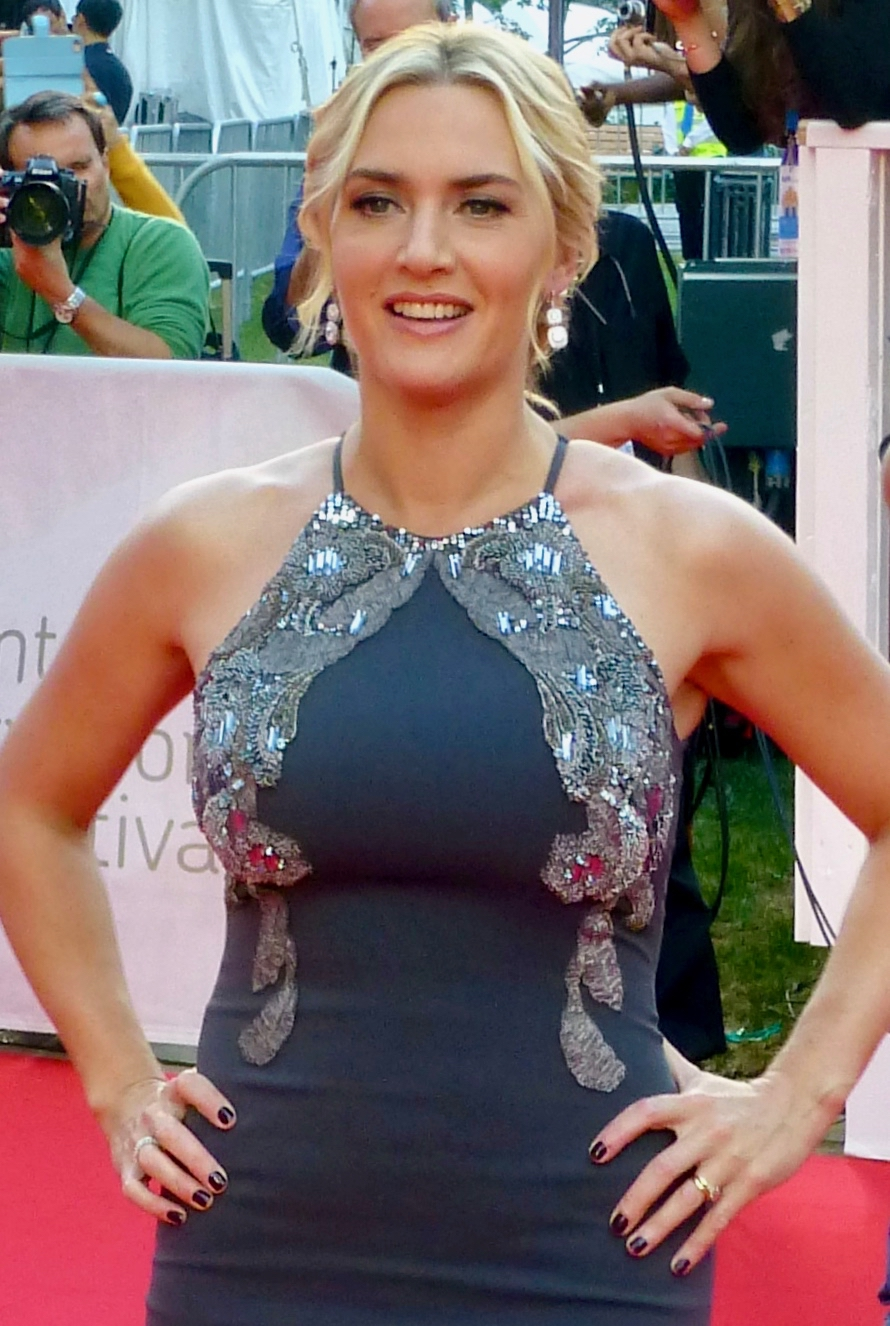
Kate Winslet at the premiere of The Dressmaker at the 2015 Toronto International Film Festival. Her performance received acclaim despite the film receiving generally mixed reviews.

The film received mixed reviews from critics. As of January 2021, the film holds a 58% approval rating on review aggregation website, Rotten Tomatoes, based on 140 reviews with an average score of 5.83/10. The site's critical consensus reads, "The Dressmaker boasts a strong central performance by Kate Winslet and a captivating array of narrative weirdness -- all of which may or may not be a comfortable fit with viewers." Metacritic gives a score of 47 out of 100, based on 27 critics, indicating "mixed or average reviews".

Justin Chang of Variety gave the film a positive review, saying, "Moorhouse's adaptation of Rosalie Ham's 2000 novel may lead audiences to expect a primmer, more well-behaved movie based on its title alone, but that doesn't mean it won't have them in stitches" and praised Winslet and Davis's performances: "Winslet, a difficult actress to root against under any circumstances, has us in her palm from the moment she steps into frame, looking like an avenging dark angel bathed in ’50s noir shadows." and "Davis, whose performance here as a booze-swilling, dementia-addled and infernally sharp-tongued old matriarch is enough of a hoot to make one further wonder what she might have done with the role of Violet Weston in August: Osage County, onscreen or onstage." Sarah Ward of Screen International noted, "Light comedy, romantic drama, small-town secrets and revenge schemes might not seem an easy or winning mix; however in The Dressmaker, the combination fits." She also praised the costumes in the film, saying that "with the intricate work of costume designers Marion Boyce and Margot Wilson clearly pivotal." Richard Ouzounian of The Star gave it four out of four stars, calling it "a true bravura style and manages to serve as revenge tragedy, romantic comedy and stylish entertainment all at once" and saying, "Winslet is smashing as Tilly Dunnage and Davis is sublime." Jon Frosch in his review for The Hollywood Reporter said, "The Dressmaker is about as far from essential viewing as one could imagine, but, for all its brightly glaring flaws, much of it qualifies as a glossy, goofy guilty pleasure."

However, Kevin Jagernauth in his review for Indiewire criticised the film, writing that it "wants to be a saucy and absurd tale of small town scandal, only to then attempt to try and turn the story completely inside out", which he describes as "a potentially interesting concept" that the movie "never commits to". However, he praised the cast: "Winslet anchors the lead role with sexiness and confidence, staying measured even [when] the movie around her isn't" and describes Judy Davis "stealing most of the scenes", and being "hilarious as Tilly's eccentric oddball mother". Gregory Ellwood of HitFix gave the film a negative review and said, "it's hard to mix over-the-top comedy and serious drama." Benjamin Lee of The Guardian gave the film two stars out of five, saying, "The film is a tonally uneven, genre-shifting hurricane of a thing, wildly careering off the rails and smashing into everything in its view," but Jake Wilson for The Sydney Morning Herald wrote that its "lurches from broad comedy to grim melodrama and back are evidently intentional, part of a strategy for throwing the viewer off-balance, along with the dramatic colour contrasts and spatial distortions ... and called it a "hoot and a shock to the system" that could be regarded as the "long-delayed feminist answer to Wake in Fright".

=== Accolades ===
The film received 13 nominations for AACTA Awards and went on to win five awards, including Best Lead Actress for Winslet, Best Supporting Actress for Davis, Best Supporting Actor for Weaving, Best Costume Design and People's Choice Award for Favourite Australian Film. Davis was also nominated for Best Supporting Actress at the AACTA International Awards.

In The Hollywood Reporter's annual critic picks, Davis's performance in the film was included among "the 25 Best Film Performances of 2016". It was one of the seven films shortlisted by the Academy Awards for Best Makeup and Hairstyling.

== See also ==
- Cinema of Australia
