= Counterpoint (Radio National) =

Australian conservative podcast and former broadcast

Counterpoint is an Australian podcast (and a former weekly broadcast) from the Radio National (RN) service of the Australian Broadcasting Corporation (ABC). The show examines social, economic and cultural issues from a politically right-wing view informed by the contemporary "conservative" movement, incorporating some of its more radical elements including right-wing libertarian, contrarian, populist and reactionary thinking, all reflecting the contrarian stance suggested by the show's name. Many of the more recent episodes are available online and for podcast despite the conclusion of the show's production and broadcast in January 2024.

== History ==
The programme was first broadcast in May 2004 with Michael Duffy as solo initial host, soon joined by Paul Comrie-Thomson as co-host. Later stand-in hosts included prominent right-wing political identities, notably Tom Switzer and Brendan O'Neill, with guest hosts including notables of similar political allegiance such as former Liberal Party star and ex-Lord Mayor of Brisbane, Sallyanne Atkinson. For its last decade plus, the programme was hosted by former veteran Liberal Party senator and federal government cabinet minister in the "conservative" Howard government, Amanda Vanstone, who remained up until the show's final radio broadcast in mid-January 2024.

== Political rationale & stance ==
The commissioning of Counterpoint by the ABC has been perceived as a partial sop to right-wing critics of the organisation who have conducted an ongoing campaign of smear against it, claiming that both the ABC and its output are somehow creatures of the political left. The newly minted show, with a markedly right-wing partisan host and agenda, was supposedly to serve as a counterbalance to the alleged bias. This followed a long and rancorous push by the partisan critics (given explicit support by the then-current Prime Minister & staunch right-wing conservative John Howard) who all made particular aggrieved mention of Phillip Adams & his tenure as veteran host of Late Night Live, a long-running RN programme whose content has sometimes reflected the progressive, left-leaning instincts that Adams is noted for.

The Counterpoint website describes its intention as introducing subjects and speakers that supposedly challenge widely held assumptions while allegedly exposing some new and seldom heard commentators. Many of these ideas and voices parallel the heavily promoted content and spokespersons of 'movement conservative' outlets and organs, such as the output and speakers readily available from right-wing think tanks, as well as their acolytes and polemicists, with the show regularly picking up on threads and ideas from 'movement conservative' sources and materials coming out of the United States.

== Living Marxism Network & other regular voices ==
Counterpoint has also embraced and featured some of the firebrands and attack dogs of the British arm of the contemporary "conservative" movement, most notably including numerous cadres and associates of the Living Marxism (LM) Network (particularly Frank Furidi and Brendan O'Neill, as well as Claire Fox, etc.) who have been commonly featured guests throughout the show's run, with O'Neill having an extended period as a regular commentator as well as being made a stand-in host for multiple episodes, including some where the remarkable decision was made to feature his own partisan monologues in preference to new guests and views.

The show has also leaned into forms of sly satire and attempts at ridicule of their chosen political enemies, with Patrick Cook at one stage being given a regular slot to feature his witty satiric commentary which he fine-tuned to skewer the show's political targets, such as the science and advocacy for action on threatening climate change, as well as "political correctness" and other common and contemporary focuses of right-wing derision. This strategy also bled into promotional announcements for the show, with one given high rotation on the RN broadcast roster with the memorable refrain of "All aboard the gravy train...", smearing the show's political enemies (particularly climate scientists and climate change activists) as corrupt.

== Climate change denial ==
Counterpoint has been active in promoting various shades of climate change denial and skepticism throughout its full run, along with pushing the denialist's discredited theories and talking points, most particularly in the years during the tenure of Duffy and Comrie-Thomson. This has included criticisms and attacks on the scientific consensus on global warming, with the show regularly featuring guests who adopted this stance, along with other varied positions on the climate change denial spectrum, including: Bob Carter, Ian Castles, Ray Evans, William Kininmonth, Jennifer Marohasy, David Henderson, Patrick J. Michaels, Bjørn Lomborg, Vincent Gray, and Garth Paltridge.

== Vanstone & "fuckwit" slur ==
On 30 August 2023, Vanstone conducted a pre-recorded interview with the noted indigenous STEM education advocate and Kamilaroi man, Adjunct Associate Professor Corey Tutt OAM. At the interview's conclusion, Vanstone spoke to her producer stating that Tutt sounded like a "fuckwit", apparently unaware that he was waiting to also speak to the producer and could hear Vanstone's every word. After Tutt spoke to the producer, Vanstone rang him and apologised. Tutt was later quoted as saying:

“And you know, even as a Young Australian of the Year, as an OAM, as an associate professor, I am still copping this shit. No matter what I do I am still copping it.”

Counterpoint did not broadcast his interview and Tutt told the ABC they do not have his permission to do so. The organisation also apologised to Tutt, as well as publicly stating that "Her [Vanstone's] conduct was not of a standard acceptable to the ABC." and that she had been counselled by her managers.

== End of production & ongoing availability ==
In December 2023, the ABC announced Counterpoint would not be returning for 2024. The show ceased production and its last episode was radio broadcast on RN on 15 January 2024, however many of the recent episodes continue to be available for podcast and online download via the ABC Listen app as well as via the show's website. In addition, a significantly large number of the earlier shows, from the first one in May 2004 onwards, were published with online transcripts that often continue to be accessible via archived older versions of the Counterpoint website.

== Theme music ==
The original theme for the show was Golden Brown, the celebrated 1982 hit song by The Stranglers, reflecting Duffy's immersion in the punk movement and its aftermath of the 1970s and '80s. The song was soon dropped after the record company that owned it asked the ABC for too much money in licencing fees. In response, the show's radical contrarian ethos was again on show with a wild switch of theme song from a post-punk anthem (and sly hymn to the pleasures of heroin) to the big band jazz sounds of the swing era, with the replacement theme song being a 1937 recording of I Want to Be Happy (the 1925 jazz standard) played by Chick Webb And His Orchestra (featuring Ella Fitzgerald on vocals). With both songs, the show's intro and outro featured instrumental excerpts from the tracks.
