= The Dressmaker (Ham novel) =

Gothic novel by Australian Rosalie Ham

- Cover of first edition
- Author: Rosalie Ham
- Genre: Gothic fiction, romance
- Publisher: Duffy & Snellgrove
- Publication date: January 1, 2000
- Publication place: Australia
- Media type: Print (hardcover)
- Pages: 296 pp (first edition)
- ISBN: 978-1875989706

The Dressmaker is a Gothic novel written by the Australian author Rosalie Ham, and is Ham's debut novel. It was first published by Duffy & Snellgrove on January 1, 2000. The story is set in a 1950s fictional Australian country town, Dungatar, and explores love, hate and haute couture.

Since its release the novel has sold over 75,000 copies and has been translated into a number of languages including German and French.

A film adaptation of the book was released on October 29, 2015, with Kate Winslet as the protagonist Tilly Dunnage. A special film tie-in edition of the novel, featuring a new book cover with Winslet as the titular character, was released worldwide from August to October 2015. The tie-in-edition of the book sold 90,000 hard copies and 20,000 ebooks.

== Background and setting ==
The novel is Rosalie Ham's first published novel, and was picked up for publication within a year after Ham finished writing it. She sent the manuscript to four publishers and received rejections but on one of the readers' advice she sent her manuscript to Duffy & Snellgrove, who picked it up for publication. According to Ham, the novel is a product of serendipity. In 1996, she enrolled in the writing programme of RMIT University but on her arrival she found that it was already full. As she was leaving, novelist Antoni Jach advised her to take a novel course instead. In novel-writing class, she got an assignment of "a 500-word synopsis of her book", which she recalled as "I had an idea and started writing it. Then you had to hand in 3,000 words, and then you had to hand in 10,000 words, and I had 30,000 words. It was only three weeks before I realised that this was the best 'accident' that had ever occurred to me."

The novel is set in a small country town of Australia. Ham, who herself was born and raised in the southern New South Wales town of Jerilderie, said that she was inspired by the fact everyone knows everything about each other and "(her) mother was a dressmaker in a small country town, and the idiosyncrasies of those two factors were the seed for the story". But she clarified that she did not intentionally use a country town based on her own experiences as she explained that "My experience in my home town was the absolute contrary (to Dungatar)."

== Plot ==
In the 1950s, Myrtle "Tilly" Dunnage returns to her hometown of Dungatar, an Australian country town, to take care of her ill mother, Molly. The people of Dungatar sent Tilly away at the age of ten because of false accusations of murder, after the death of fellow student Stewart Pettyman.

Tilly, who has since become an expert dressmaker trained by Madeleine Vionnet in Paris, starts a dressmaking business and transforms the locals with her couture creations. Many of the townsfolk who revile her nevertheless arrange for her to make them couture outfits. Sergeant Farrat, the town's policeman with an eye for beautiful fashion, liaises with Tilly in exchange for dressmaking assistance and design advice. Teddy, the eldest son of the town's poor family, begins to pursue Tilly, and tries to assist her in standing up to the vicious gossip and small-minded attitudes of the townsfolk.

Most of the women in town arrange for Tilly to create individual gowns for the town dance. She also makes her own frock, but when she and Teddy, the town's heartthrob, arrive at the dance, her name has been removed from all the tables in the hall, and one of the townsfolk blocks the door to stop her coming in. Teddy finds her crying outside, and takes her back to his ramshackle caravan. There, he helps her remember the 'murder' she doesn't remember committing: as a bastard child, she was teased and bullied unmercifully by the rest of the town children. One day Stewart Pettyman, the abusive and physical bully, cornered her and charged at her, head-down like a bull, intending to wind her and probably injure her severely. Instead, she stood aside at the last moment, and Stewart hit the wall head on at a run and broke his neck. Sergeant Farrat arranged for her to go to a Melbourne boarding school, where she began her dressmaking education.

Tilly and Teddy make love, then, later on top of a silo, he tells her of the fun he had as a boy, jumping into the town's wheat bins. He then proceeds to do it, despite Tilly's warning cries. The silo holds sorghum instead of wheat, and Teddy suffocates as he sinks into the grain.

Tilly remains in town, and as the townsfolk blame her for Teddy's death and abandon her again, she begins making clothing for the neighbouring towns' women. A town-based rivalry begins. Then Molly Dunnage dies. Shortly afterwards, one of the town's meanest gossips is critically injured while she is snooping, and the town's chemist drowns. Both of these deaths are accidents. Tilly proceeds to tell the town councilman's wife, Marigold Pettyman, the truth about Tilly's heritage and Stewart's death, that Councilman Evan Pettyman is Tilly's father and he has also been drugging Marigold and assaulting her at night. Marigold then murders her husband and attempts to commit suicide using the same drug her husband used on her.

The sergeant is horrified when a District Inspector comes to investigate the sudden surge of deaths. Tilly, while fitting one of the women from the neighbouring town, hears of an upcoming Eisteddfod and suggests that drama should be included. The local townsfolk come to her to make the costumes for their version of Macbeth, which they do not know and want to have staged in Baroque costumes. Tilly refuses to do so unless she is paid for past work and upfront for the costumes. The money is taken from funds which should have been sent off to insure the town's buildings. Tilly makes all the costumes, and watches as the entire town departs to either participate or watch the performance. She then covers the town in petrol and sets her house on fire, taking only her sewing machine. Tilly departs by train, leaving the burnt town for the locals to discover after the show.

== Characters ==
- Myrtle "Tilly" Dunnage: As a child, Tilly was targeted by the entire town. Accused of attacking Stewart Pettyman, Tilly was sent away without trial as an act of pettiness. After leaving Dungatar, she worked in the fashion industry throughout Europe and on her return becomes the new popular dressmaker of the town. Despite her newfound skills, Tilly remains an insecure and defeated child at heart, who longs for an explanation for the town's treatment of her and their acceptance. Tilly has a weak and receding personality, believing herself to be "cursed", though she tries to be kind. The deaths of Teddy and her mother inspire her to finally give up on trying to please the townspeople, and seek revenge instead.
- Molly Dunnage: Tilly's mother; she is mentally unstable and also called "Mad Molly" by the townspeople. Once upon a time, she had been a beautiful and willful girl who had a short fling with the much older Evan Pettyman. She was smart enough to break up with him quickly, but falling pregnant with Tilly doomed her. Evan Pettyman ensured Molly was unemployable and ostracized, forcing her to be his secret mistress to survive. Evan never let her forget the insult of turning him down, and encouraged the townspeople to torment her as punishment.
- Ted McSwiney: Love interest of Tilly and star footballer of the town. His family has the lowest class status of the town, but Teddy's handsome appearance, amiable nature, and athletic skill grants him the occasional special privilege.
- Sergeant Horatio Farrat: Town's only police officer and a secret crossdresser.
- Gertrude "Trudy" Pratt: The awkward daughter of the town grocers, who dreams of being popular and lovely. Marrying the handsome and college-educated William with the help of Tilly's dresses (and a lot of manipulation) was supposed to endow her with those traits and give her an escape from the grocery and into a glamorous life. However, she is soon shocked to realize that her husband's family is not successful and well off, like Elsbeth presents them as. Her husband quickly loses interest after their marriage, her mother in law still treats her like an uneducated rube, and her parents will not freely give her financial support. Trudy turns to creating the Ladies Society and then heading the circle of nasty women in town to gain the status and image she desires, and joins her mother in law in trying to drive her husband into being successful enough to provide the high class life she wants. Increasingly desperate for attention, she leads the rivalry with the neighboring town and is a major decision maker in the choice to put on MacBeth and purchase expensive costumes. Trudy's hysteria during the disastrous play is used by her husband as an excuse to have her committed.
- William Beaumont: Husband of Trudy and son of Elsbeth, who returns to Dungatar after attending agricultural college in Armidale. His grasping mother annoys him with her clingy dependency, and with her lofty airs, which neither she nor he can afford to support. In an attempt to rebel against his controlling mother who looks down on Trudy's looks and background, (and to conveniently settle the massive debts his mother has run up with Trudy's parents) he marries Trudy and later realises that he does not love her, especially as she tries to emulate his mother's 'high class' manners to impress him. He feels bullied by his mother and his wife, and frees himself by abandoning Trudy to an asylum and taking their son.
- Elsbeth Beaumont: A controlling and snobbish widow, the mother of William, who lives outside of Dungatar at the farm. She has champagne tastes on a beer budget, and is forever bragging about the success of her college-educated son. She has incurred significant debts with the local stores, which she expects her son to cover.
- Mona Beaumont: Second child of Elsbeth and sister of William. A hypersexual and ugly girl, ignored by everyone, Mona is forced to marry Lesley Muncan due to a mistaken belief that the pair had sex. Mona causes a major scandal by masturbating on stage during the play.
- Lesley Muncan: Initially a visitor to town pretending to be a 'dressage' instructor, when he is actually a poor servant. Due to a misunderstanding, the likely-homosexual Lesley reluctantly marries Mona Beaumont and the two form an amiable couple.
- Evan Pettyman: Councillor of the town and father of Tilly and Stewart. Pettiman is a cruel, controlling, petty, and vicious man, with an extreme misogynistic streak. Nonetheless, he is charming and powerful, which he uses to target women for affairs and control. He used his parental status to have Tilly sent away after the death of his son, Stewart, less because he believed her to have killed him, and more to be vindictive.
- Marigold Pettyman: Wife of Evan; she has cleaning OCD, depression, and agoraphobia. She is often disoriented and unsure of the time or place. Marigold had the misfortune of being the timid and moneyed daughter of an influential townsman. Her money and pushover nature made her a target of Evan, who baby trapped her into marriage. After their marriage, Evan drove her to neurosis and encourages her mental illnesses to control her. Marigold's daily 'medicine' is actually a soporific tranquilizer, and her husband rapes her while she is blacked out. Though she is devoted to the memory of her deceased only son, Stewart, she is aware he was a little monster, and despises his resemblance to her husband. After learning of her husband's foul acts, Marigold murders him.
- Stewart Pettyman: Son of Evan and Marigold; Stewart was a nasty bully who took after his father. He took especial pleasure in targeting Tilly, though he tormented most of the other children as well. Stewart died as a child in a self-caused accident while trying to attack Tilly. His death is labeled a murder, and Tilly is accused of killing him.
- Muriel Pratt: Mother of Trudy and wife of Alvin; she owns a store in town with her husband and is part of the snobby women of town.
- Alvin Pratt: Father of Trudy and husband of Muriel; owns a grocery store in town with his wife. Alvin enjoys people being indebted to him, and is solely focused on money. He even runs debts up on his own daughter, Trudy.
- Percival Almanac: An orthodox, controlling, and violent man who looks down on others; he owns the town pharmacy and makes his own medicines. He often makes medicine which is painful, harmful, or damaging on purpose to 'punish' sinners, because he believes ailments are the result of sin. He beat his wife when he was younger, but now suffers from Parkinson's and is folded over as a hunchback.
- Irma Almanac: Wife of Percival; she is suffering from some disease but her husband, with his controlling temper, does not let her get proper medication as he believes that her pain is the result of sin.
- Edward McSwiney: Father of Teddy and the town's handyman; he and his family are considered outcasts and live at the edge of town.
- Mae McSwiney: Wife of Edward and mother of eleven children including Teddy and Barney; she often checks on Molly in the absence of Tilly from the town.
- Barney McSwiney: Brother of Teddy; has some kind of disability.
- Faith O’Brien: Lead singer of the town's local band; married to Hamish O’Brien but having an affair with Reginald Blood, which she does not hide at all but still her husband is unaware of it.
- Hamish O’Brien: Husband of Faith; he is in the local band and also works as a conductor for the trains coming in and out of Dungatar.
- Reginald Blood: Town's local butcher; he is having an affair with married Faith O'Brien and keeps the townspeople silent about his affair by bribing them.
- Prudence Dimm: Tilly's former schoolteacher; teaches at school in Dungatar. Prudence has long held a candle for Evan Pettyman, and as a result, showed heavy favoritism towards his son, Stewart, whom she doted on. Prudence took cruel pleasure in tormenting Tilly and the other poorer students, and lied on the police report that she saw Tilly murder Stewart.
- Ruth Dimm: Works at the post office and is in a secret relationship with Nancy Pickett. Ruth opens and reads all of the letters passing through her care, and sometimes keeps desirable packages, or refuses to send mail from certain people. Ruth is the one who took the town's insurance check, and instead of mailing it, used it to pay Tilly for the costumes.
- Nancy Pickett: A strong woman; she is in a secret relationship with Ruth.
- Bobby Pickett: Brother of Nancy; he is gentle and slow because of which he was picked on by other students in school.
- Lois Pickett: Mother of Nancy and Bobby; famous for picking her own scabs and blackheads.
- Purl Bundle: She works at the town's local hotel and is described as very beautiful.
- Fred Bundle: Husband of Purl. Owns the town's local pub.
- Septimus Crescent: One of the townsmen; he always has pub spats with Hamish O’Brien and despite knowing that Hamish's wife is having an affair with Reginald Blood, he never reveals that to him.
- Beula Harridene: Town's malicious snoop. She will sneak around people's houses, snoop through their things, and take any evidence she's found to the police or Evan to have people punished.
- Una Pleasance: Tilly's rival dressmaker; hired by the townswomen. She is a relative of Elsbeth, and has an affair with Evan Pettyman. Her clothes are subpar compared to Tilly's workmanship.

== Themes ==
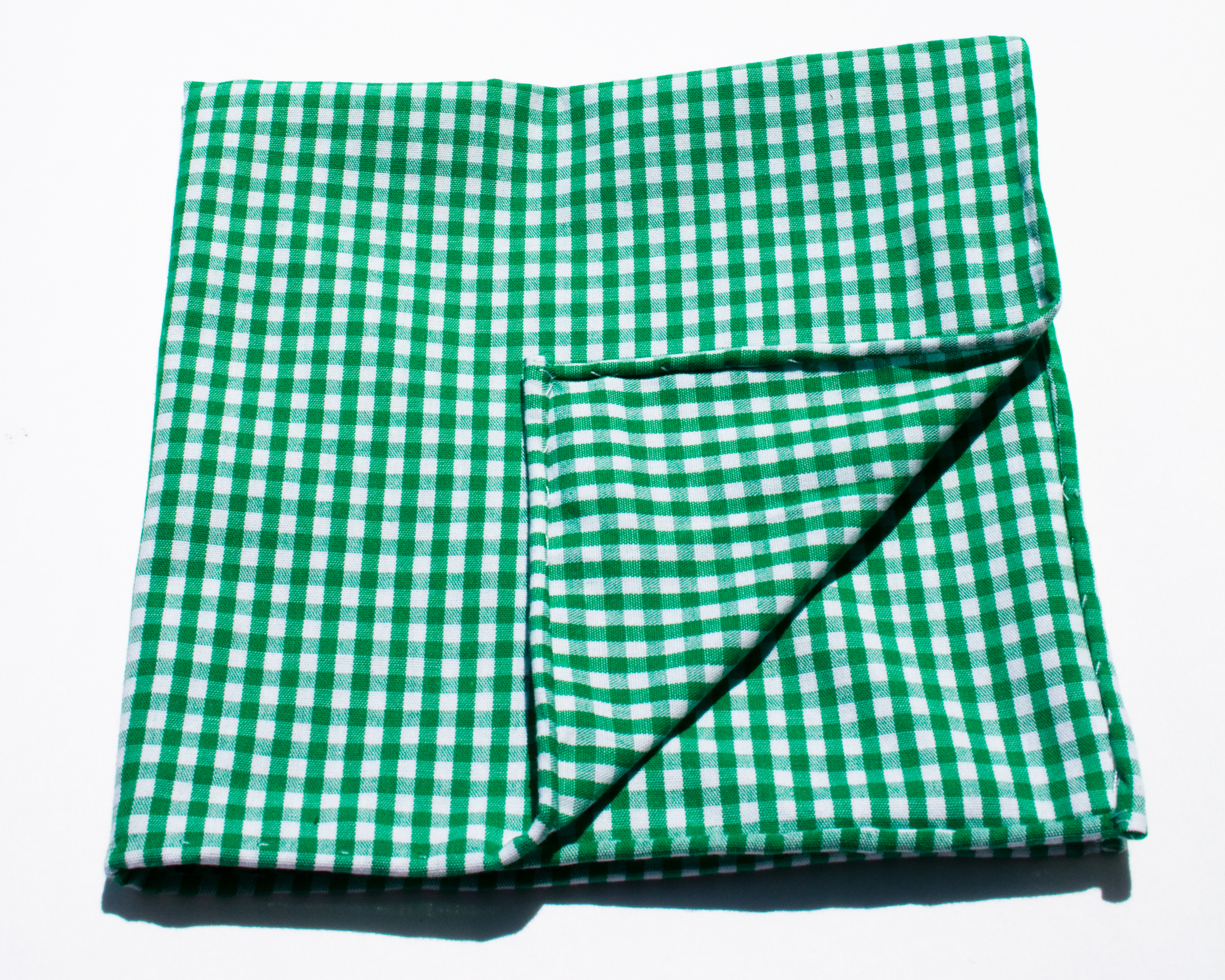
gingham

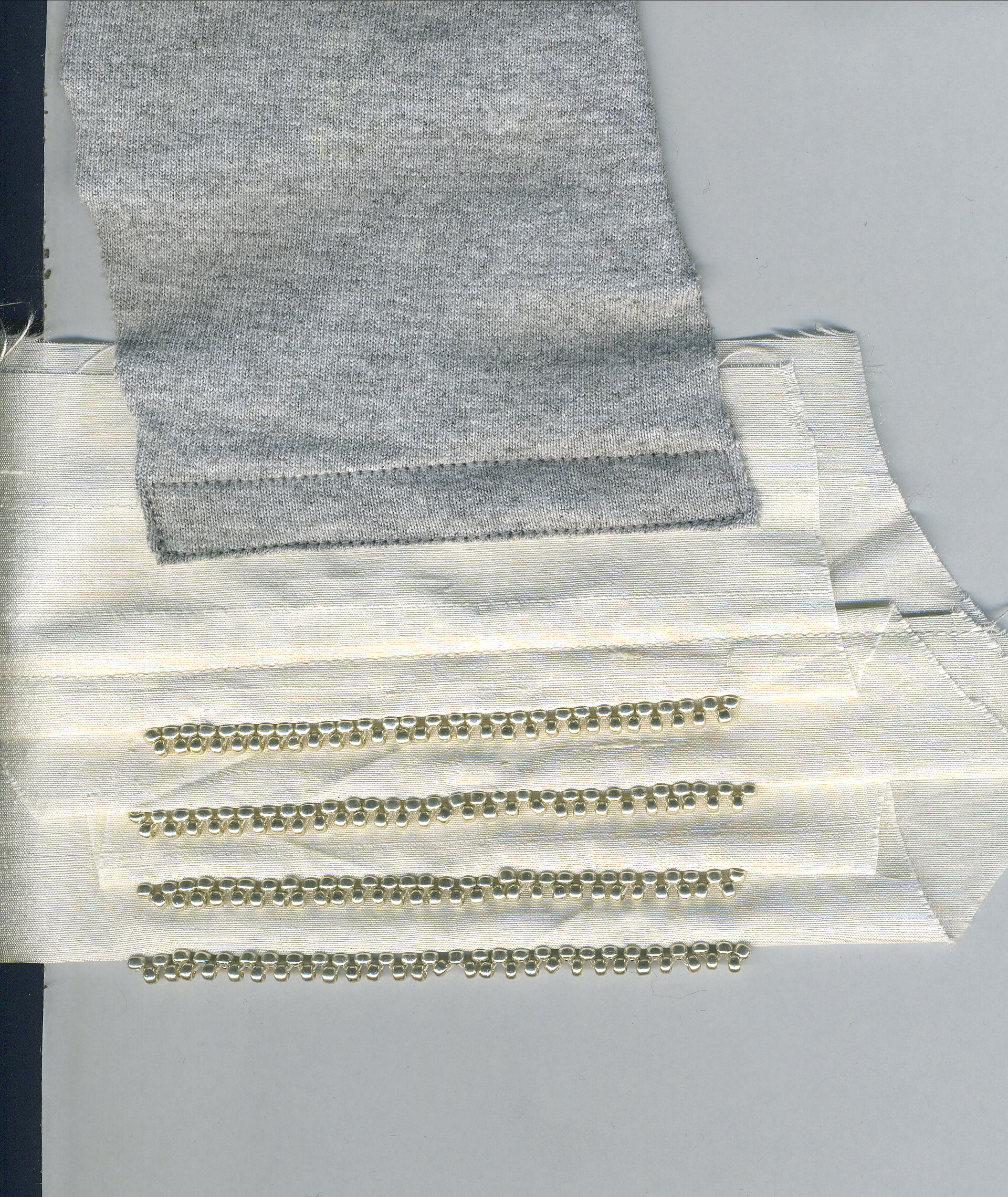
shantung

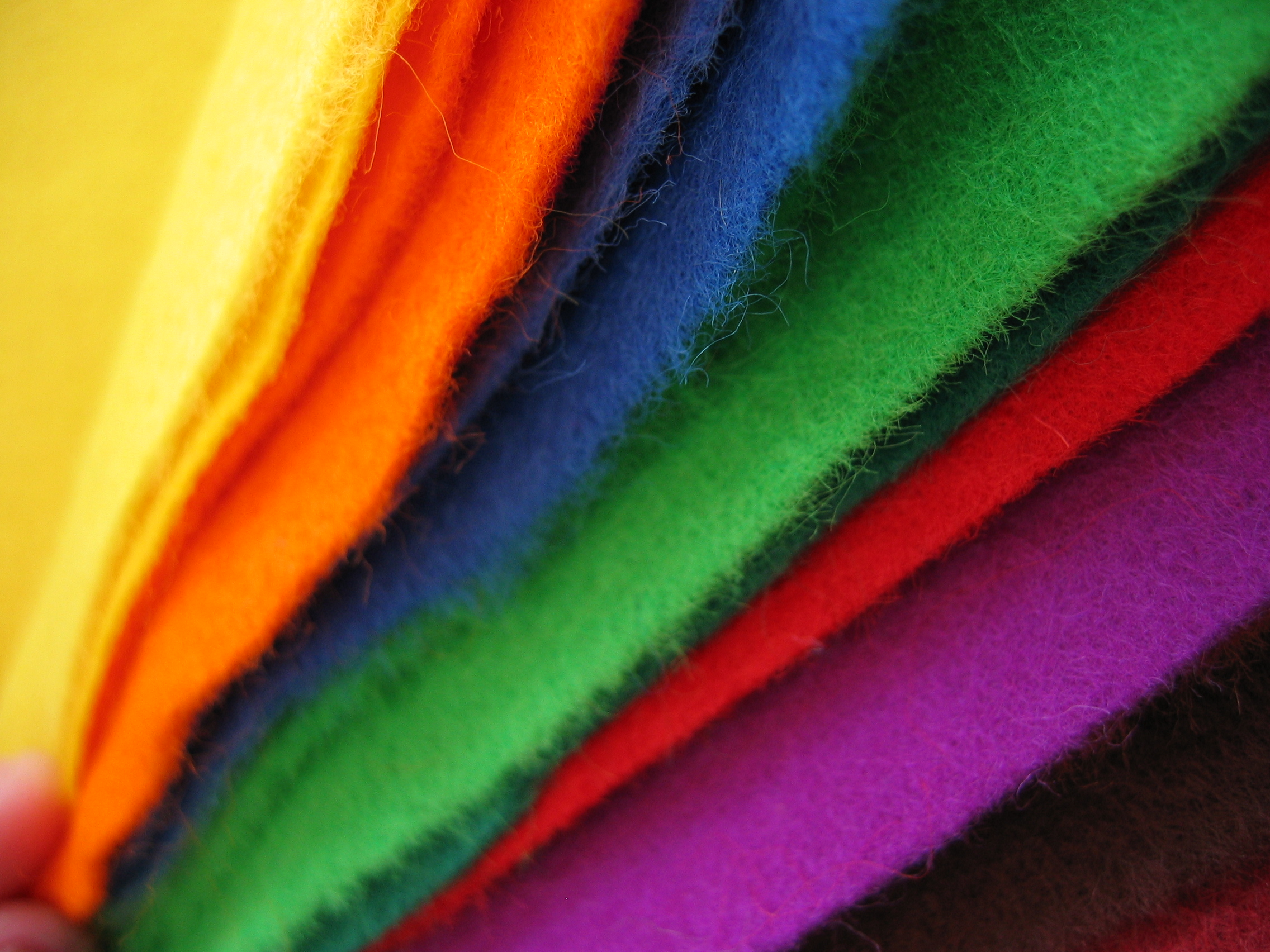
felt

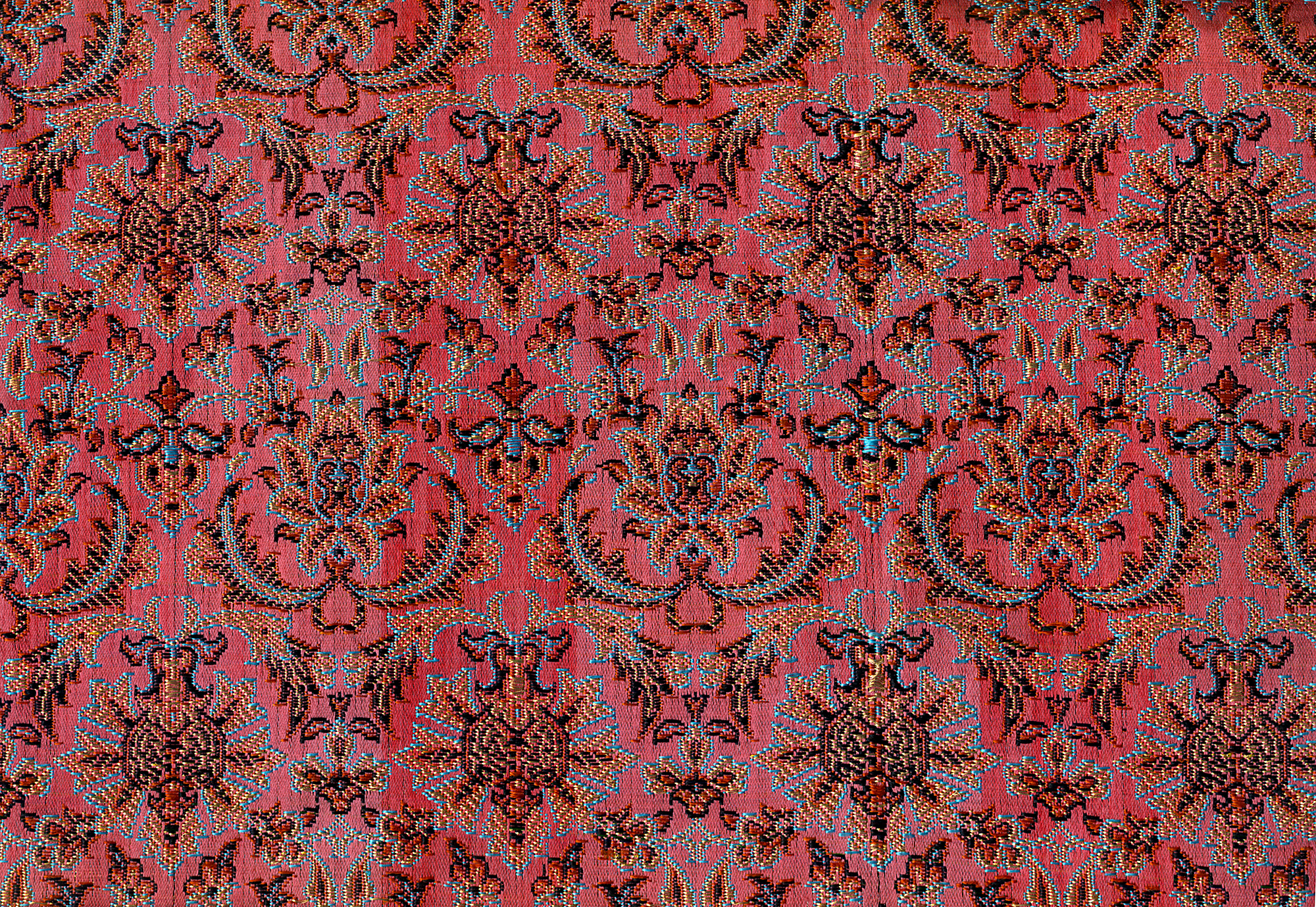
brocade

Four sections of novel each named after a different fabric

The novel probes the human emotions and behaviours and how hypocrisy, bigotry, prejudice, vanity and malice alter people's perspective and make unacceptable things acceptable and vice versa.

In a review for the Trinity College Foundation Studies Literature paper "Steep Stairs Review Collected and Neglected Works", Neralie Hoadley notes how "[the novel] is gothic in the sense of being extreme in its depictions of events in the overstated manner associated with tragedy. Love is central to the intensity of feeling that drives the main narrative line, though only covered with the utmost brevity and obliqueness. Hate is essential in any good tragedy, and as this novel deals with the base motivation of revenge, hate is present in abundance. Haute couture provides Rosalie Ham with a satirical voice to lampoon rural sensibilities." Hoadley also compares the climax of the novel with Shakespearean tragedy Macbeth, referring towards the fate of characters and also the play of Macbeth that Dungatar's people participate in.

In an interview Ham describes the most common traits she found annoying in humans and similarly these traits are incorporated in her characters, "three of the things I find MOST annoying about humans (suspicion, malice and prejudice) but it's rife among all of us."

== Reception ==
=== Critical response ===
Daneet Steffens of The Boston Globe in her review called it "Blunt, raw and more than a little fantastical, the novel exposes both the dark and the shimmering lights in our human hearts." In a review for New South Wales Writers' Centre, Sophia Barnes gave the novel a positive review and praising Ham, wrote that "Ham has a wonderful sense of the absurdities of human character and the extremes of human behaviour, even in the humdrum domestic lives of a small town." The Australian praised Ham's writing by saying that "Rosalie Ham’s The Dressmaker was one of those rare first novels that arrived virtually unannounced…and gathered momentum largely by word of mouth to become a bestseller and book club favourite. Ham writes delightfully rich set pieces and descriptive passages… Ham’s eye for the absurd, the comical and the poignant are highly tuned. It is a first novel to be proud of, and definitely one to savour and enjoy." The Sydney Morning Herald called it "a feral version of Sea Change." The Age also appreciated Ham's writing by saying that "Ham does show herself a writer with strong visual gifts and a pleasingly sour sense of humour." Another reviewer said in his review that "The Dressmaker is a delightful first novel that is at times laugh-out-loud amusing and which beautifully captures the narrow, small-minded bigotry of rural townships."

=== Accolades ===
In 2001, the novel was short-listed for Christina Stead Prize for Fiction at New South Wales Premier's Literary Awards and was nominated for Vision Australia’s Braille Book of the Year and Booksellers Association Book of the Year Award. In 2007, it was the finalist at State Library of Victoria's Most Popular Novel. The book also made the Victorian Certificate of Education reading list three times.

== Tie-in-edition with film ==
The Dressmaker
- Special edition cover
- Author: Rosalie Ham
- Published: 2015
- Publication place: Australia
- Media type: Print (hardcover)
- Pages: 320 pp
- ISBN: 9781846689949

A new edition of the book with the cover featuring Kate Winslet as Myrtle "Tilly" Dunnage was released by Penguin Books on August 11, 2015 in USA, Canada, and by Macmillan Publishers in Australia in September, 2015. In the UK, it was published by Serpent's Tail on October 22, 2015.

On July 30, 2015, Ham appeared at the Melbourne International Film Festival's event Books at MIFF to discuss the book's transition into film, along with Sue Maslin, Jocelyn Moorhouse and original publisher of the book Michael Duffy, who revealed that the book will be published in 16 new territories. Duffy even hired a production person and a publicist (as the original publisher Duffy & Snellgrove had shut down their production in 2005) to handle the release of 25,000 copies of the novel, describing it as "the biggest print run we've ever done".

Ham promoted the book, first at a lecture arranged by The Ewing Trust at Yarra libraries titled The Dressmaker from Page to Screen on August 6, 2015. Next she appeared at the literary lunch for the discussion of the transformation of the book to screen, which took place at Fowles Wine on August 23, 2015.

== Film adaptations ==
Ham originally sold the rights of the novel in the mid-2000s and wrote the screenplay for the film herself but the project was shelved. Sue Maslin, along with Film Art Media, acquired the rights to the novel for the film adaptation in 2009 and brought Jocelyn Moorhouse on board as director. Moorhouse also adapted a screenplay from Ham's novel. Universal Pictures acquired the distribution rights of the film in Australia and New Zealand.

In August 2013, it was announced that Kate Winslet and Judy Davis had joined the cast of the film as Myrtle "Tilly" and Molly Dunnage respectively. Liam Hemsworth as Teddy McSwiney along with Isla Fisher as Gertrude Pratt and Elizabeth Debicki as Una joined the cast in early May 2014, but later Fisher and Debicki dropped out and were replaced by Sarah Snook and Sacha Horler respectively. In October 2014, Hugo Weaving joined the cast as Sergeant Farrat along with Caroline Goodall, Shane Bourne, Kerry Fox, Rebecca Gibney, Shane Jacobson, Alison Whyte and Genevieve Lemon.

Principal photography began from October 17, 2014, in Melbourne, Australia at Docklands Studios and continued all over Victoria, Australia and was finished on December 13, 2014. It was released on October 29, 2015 in Australia.
