= Antoni Jach =

Australian novelist, painter and playwright

Antoni Jach (born 8 May 1956) is an Australian novelist, painter and playwright. His most recent book is Travelling Companions, a novel about friendship, travel and storytelling.

His previous novels are The Weekly Card Game, a tragicomic study of quotidian repetition and The Layers of the City, a meditation on contemporary Paris, civilisation and barbarism which was shortlisted for The Age Book of the Year Fiction Award and was translated into Turkish under the title Sehrin Katmanlari)., and Napoleon's Double, a narrative enlisting history and philosophy for its own neo-baroque ends.

Antoni is also the author of a book of poetry, An Erratic History, an idiosyncratic history of Australia, and two plays, Miss Furr and Miss Skeene and Waiting for Isabella. He is the creator of two artist books and his paintings have been on display in an exhibition at Le Globo in Paris. He has a painting featured on the cover of Antipodes, the literary journal of the American Association for Australian Literary Studies

== Biography ==
Antoni was born in Melbourne to a Polish father Władysław Jach (the author of a book of poetry Most Human Beings are Dreamers and of a memoir Walk in a Wind) and an Australian mother, Margaret Jach (née Taylor). Margaret was descended on her mother’s side from the Clancys of Castletownroche in Ireland and her forebears on her mother’s side arrived in Melbourne on 4 November 1841. It is claimed that Margaret's grandfather, Thomas Gerald Clancy, was the basis for Banjo Paterson's poems 'Clancy of the Overflow' and 'The Man from Snowy River'. Władysław's father was the mayor of the village of Skronina and Władysław, according to his memoir, spent most of World War II in a Nazi concentration camp.

Antoni's (unpublished) novel Dina Club was shortlisted for The Australian/Vogel Literary Award in 1990. He completed a Bachelor of Arts degree in English and Art History at La Trobe University. He also holds a PhD from the University of Melbourne. His PhD dissertation was on the role of the visual image in W.G. Sebald's novel, Austerlitz.

He began teaching at RMIT in 1986 where he taught until 2011. He is married to the novelist Sallie Muirden, with whom he has two children, Hayley and Oliver.

His novels are modernist in style and his interest in Europe, particularly France and its intellectuals, has inspired Napoleon's Double and his exploration of Paris in The Layers of the City. He has interviewed many writers, including Salman Rushdie, Joseph Heller and the art-historian and poet TJ Clark

== Teaching ==
Antoni, together with Anne Richter, established the renowned Professional Writing and Editing course at Royal Melbourne Institute of Technology (RMIT) in 1988. He taught in that course initially, while later he taught in a Masters by coursework creative writing course and supervised MA and PhD by research candidates at RMIT. Stephen Grimwade, a former Melbourne Writers Festival Director and ex-student of Antoni's has been quoted as saying that Antoni was 'open to students' ideas rather than just telling us what to think'.

Antoni started teaching a series of novel-writing masterclasses to published and experienced writers in January 2009 and after leaving RMIT in 2011 he started his own business teaching masterclasses, which were mainly taught in the Board Room of the Wheeler Centre in Melbourne.

== Novels ==
Antoni's first novel, The Weekly Card Game, was published in 1994. It was described by the literary critic, Jean-François Vernay, in Antipodes magazine as 'a tour de force'. Vernay added: 'Trying to entertain using the subject of boredom is a risky challenge few writers would dare take up in an increasingly market-oriented publishing industry. The comic effect is mainly achieved through a terse but very stylish prose sprinkled with deadpan humour, the action being revealed through the eyes of a self-effacing focalizer'.

The critic Helen Daniel said in Books and Writing on ABC Radio National the following: ‘The Weekly Card Game is quite remarkable in contemporary Australian writing. I think there's nothing like it that has been published in the last twenty years or so. There's one possible exception which is some of Murray Bail's work which is detached and dispassionate and yet full of a sense of absurdity and a baroque sense of the entrapments of the Australian consciousness.’

The novelist James Bradley reviewed the novel in the following terms: ‘The book itself employs an ingenious and quite daring structure. The Weekly Card Game is a deceptive book. Within its simple premise lies a deeply layered felt story that plays like a coda for lost youth. It is a lament for time passing, a testament to the depth of passion, of love, even of feeling, yet within its vast ennui it is a rich and beautiful book written with great compassion and intelligence. It is a sophisticated, witty, and, perhaps unusually for an Australian novel, deeply urbane book.’

Antoni’s second novel, The Layers of the City was published in 1999. The novelist Carmel Bird reviewed the novel for The Age in the following terms: ‘The Layers of the City is wonderful. It is unusual and plotless in the traditional sense. The city is Paris. The narrative voice takes the reader from cafe tables to musings on the Internet to delvings into the history trapped in the geological strata beneath the city, to lovely, sharp philosophical moments . . . There are sweet strong notes of optimism and harmony in spite of the horrors and discords of recorded events.’

Antoni's third novel, Napoleon's Double, was published in 2007. In The Sydney Morning Herald, reviewer Peter Pierce described it as ‘an intellectual treat of an unusual kind, at once indulgent, slow-moving, engrossing. It is the high point of Jach's career’. Pierce added, ‘The two most striking extended passages in the book emulate the kind of probing by naive inquiry found in the work of Jean-Antoine's hero, Voltaire. Three of the companions are sent as spies to the Egyptian town of El Arish. Posing as Italian surgeons, their ostensible mission is to cure a reclusive prince of an undiagnosed illness: ‘He wishes to escape the intertwined ropes of melancholy and lethargy.’ The discussion about how he can be “cured of life itself” is virtuosic. The self-proclaimed servants of knowledge and “the empirical world” will still find that mesmerism and magnetism do the trick.’

Antoni’s fourth novel, Travelling Companions, was published in 2021 and it was reviewed by the novelist Paul Morgan thus: 'The recurring details, circling stories, and performance of departures and returns, make Travelling Companions more reminiscent of oral storytelling than a compact modern novel. The narrator carries Bocaccio’s Decameron with him, but his tale hints at a far older, pre-literate tradition, when travelling storytellers would recite a long chain of stories linked by a subtle thread, such as Scheherazade, for example . . . For the characters and readers of Travelling Companions too, it is stories which make sense of our lives – the lies that tell the truth'.

The Irish novelist, John Connolly, described the novel in the following terms: ‘Antoni Jach takes one of the oldest of storytelling forms, the traveller who shares with us the tales of other travellers, and makes new magic from it. Travelling Companions is a joy from start to finish.’

While the literary critic Andrew McLeod, in Australian Book Review, wrote the following: 'Like the priest with the alchemist in the Yeoman's story in The Canterbury Tales – like the corporate raider in the novel who falls for the parrot she is minding – I fell for Travelling Companions. It was a sublime pleasure, and, yes, I wished it would never end'.

== Bibliography ==
=== Fiction ===
- The Weekly Card Game McPhee Gribble (1994) ISBN 0-86914-322-0
- The Layers of the City Hodder Headline (1999) ISBN 0-7336-0944-9
- Napoleon's Double Giramondo Publishing (2007) ISBN 978-1-920882-23-5
- Travelling Companions Transit Lounge (2021) ISBN 978-1-925760-80-4

=== Poetry ===
- An Erratic History Brunswick Hills Press (1988) ISBN 0-9590929-4-3

== Plays ==
- Miss Furr and Miss Skeene (2006), fortyfivedownstairs, Melbourne.
- Waiting For Isabella (Act One) (2010), fortyfivedownstairs, Melbourne.
