= Duffy & Snellgrove =

Australian publishing company

Duffy & Snellgrove is a small, independent publishing house founded in Australia in 1996 by journalist Michael Duffy and his wife Alex Snellgrove. Since November 2005, the company has stopped publishing new works, although they continue to publish their backlist.

Some authors published by Duffy & Snellgrove have included Peter Robb, John Birmingham, Rosalie Ham, Ken Layne and Les Murray.
