= Ian Munro (director) =

Australian film and television director and producer

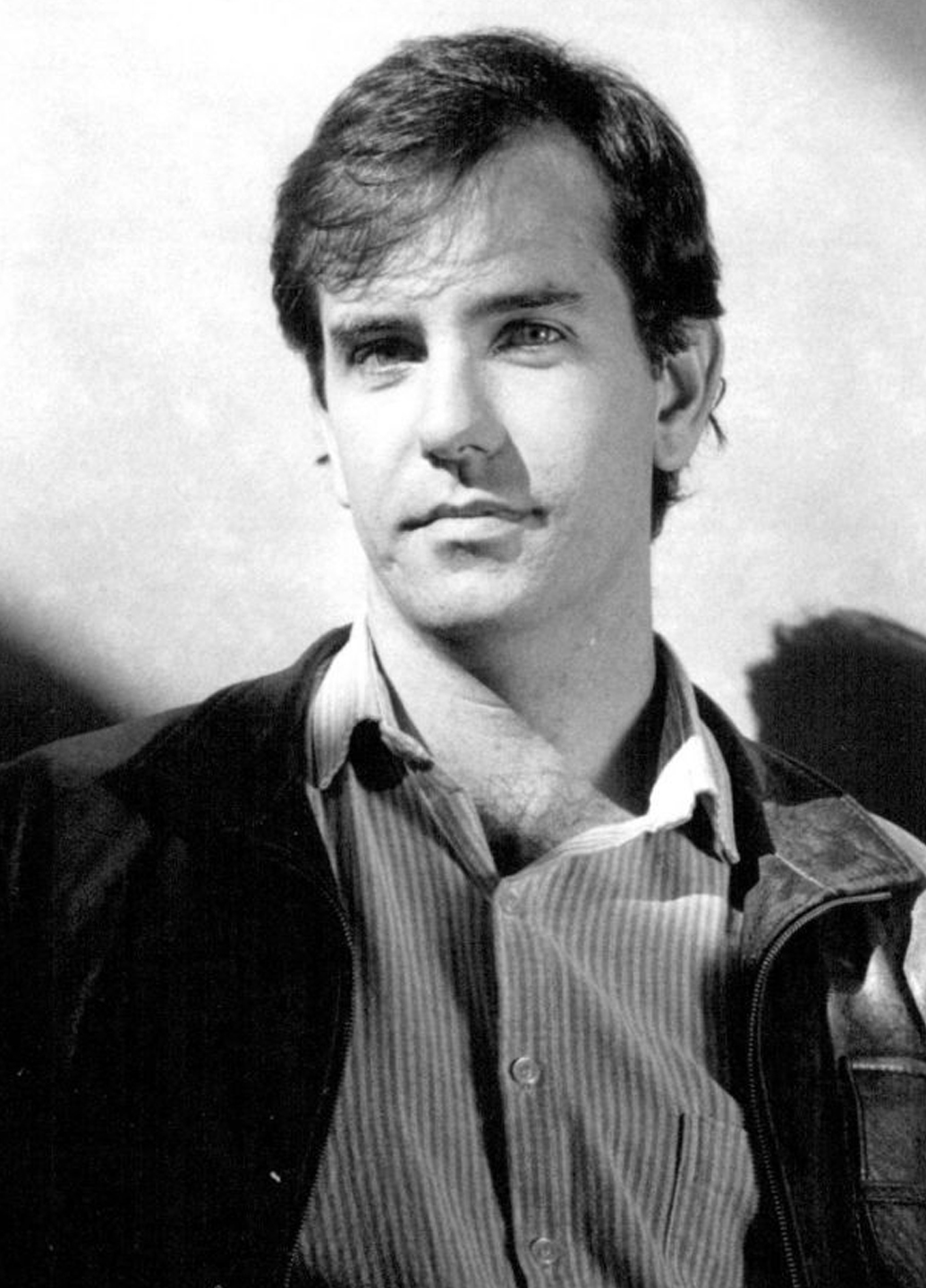
- Munro in 1987
- Born: Ian Alexander Munro; 1957 or 1958 (age 67–68); Sydney, New South Wales, Australia
- Education: AFTRS
- Occupations: Director; producer
- Years active: 1980–present

Ian Alexander Munro (born 1957/1958) is an Australian film and television director and producer. His career has spanned a variety of genres including telemovies, documentaries and children's programs.

Munro has also directed various performances for the stage. He was the first staff elected representative on the Board of Film Australia.

== Training ==
Munro studied at the Australian Film, Television and Radio School where his final year film Life Begins at 40 won the Sammy Award for best TV Documentary. He graduated in 1980.

== Documentaries ==
As a young filmmaker, Munro began making social documentaries, including the Logie winning series TV Specials with Michael Willesee which were screened in primetime on Sunday nights.

Through his career, he explored other documentary genres, directing a number of major "thesis style" series. Last Chance for the Lucky Country, The Unfair Go and The Opposite Sex were shot all over the world. To celebrate the centenary of Australia's nationhood, Ian was asked to direct the historical series Federation.

== Television films ==
In the late 1980s, Munro had the opportunity to make a film taking the first inside look at Australia's new Family Court. Wanting to take advantage of this unique access, while still protecting the privacy of those families facing harrowing events in their lives, the production team created a ground-breaking approach. Munro found a judge willing to rule on a fictitious case, to be presented by practicing lawyers and dealt with by actual officials of the court. Actors, utilising improvised dialogue, were to play the roles of the family members. The result was ‘Custody’, an emotional 90 minunte telemovie screened on the Nine Network and Channel 4 UK. The cast and crew didn't know how their story would end until the last day of shooting, when the judge handed down his verdict. Ian used his years of experience making ‘fly on the wall’ documentaries to create a film that felt real. With this innovative technique, he captured powerful performances and actual emotional experiences.

Custody was screened at multiple film festivals including the Krakow Festival and was exhibited at the Museum of Modern Art in New York. It won numerous awards in Australia and overseas - winning Best TV Drama at the Human Rights Awards, Best Feature at the Shanghai TV Festival and Mayors Prize at the St Kilda Film Festival.

The success of this approach to filmmaking led Ian to two further feature-length films. 'Prejudice', the story of two women who turn to the law as they fight for equality and 'Act of Necessity’, in which a mother takes the law into her own hands as she struggles with the mass spraying of insecticides near her rural community.

Prejudice was screened on the Nine Network and Channel 4 UK and won the John Grierson Award for Best Docudrama, and the silver medal at the Houston International Film Festival.

Act of Necessity screened on Channel 4 UK, the ABC, and French Television. It received the AFI award for Best Performance by a Juvenile.

== Children's television ==
As he began his own family, Munro became interested in children's programming. His first children's television production was Johnson & Friends which he co-created with Ron Saunders and John Patterson for Film Australia. It was immensely successful across the world and screened in over 50 territories on various networks including the BBC in the United Kingdom, TV Cultura in Brazil, Fuji TV in Japan and the Fox Children's Network in the US. The series was nominated for two International Emmy Awards and as a result of the success of this series, Ian went on to direct just about every top Australian pre-school television program, including; Play School, Hi-5, Bananas in Pyjamas, Giggle and Hoot, Raggs, Jay's Jungle, Magical Tales, New MacDonald's Farm, Cushion Kids, Boffins and Magic Mountain.

The American version of Hi-5 was also directed by Ian for Discovery Kids – it too was nominated for an Emmy Award. The sell-out live Hi-5 stage show Munro directed won the first Helpman Award for Best Children's Presentation. Ian also became Series Producer of Hi-5 in Australia. In later years, the children's series Toybox and Pipsqueaks were co-created, produced and directed by Ian Munro.

Munro's directing credits include programming for older kids as well; with the Australian/German co-productions Backyard Science and Kid Detectives and Nickelodeon’s series Camp Orange. The international co-production Quest (China Central Television, ABC and Beyond International) was shot throughout Australia and China.

Munro also turned his hand to children's game shows, co-creating, producing and directing Lab Rats Challenge, which gained many international sales as well as screenings on three Australian TV Networks.

Munro is regarded as one of Australia's most successful directors in the field of children's television.

== Personal life ==
In 2019, Munro suffered heart failure with serious complications. He had multiple cardiac arrests and was shocked back to life over 200 times. To the astonishment of his medical team, he survived.

== Film and television credits ==
- I, Myself
- Willesee Specials
- The Unfair Go
- Last Chance For The Lucky Country
- Custody
- Prejudice
- Johnson & Friends
- Act of Necessity
- Boffins
- The Opposite Sex
- Bananas in Pyjamas
- Magic Mountain
- Federation
- Play School
- Hi-5
- Hi-5 (US)
- Cushion Kids
- New MacDonald's Farm
- Raggs
- Camp Orange
- Backyard Science
- Lab Rats Challenge
- Kid Detectives
- Magical Tales
- Toybox
- Quest
- Pipsqueaks
- Giggle and Hoot
- ABC New Year’s Eve 2015 Children’s Special
- Jay's Jungle

== Stage credits ==
- Johnson and Friends - The Stage Show
- Blinky Bill Live
- Hi-5
