= New MacDonald's Farm =

- Genre: Children's television
- Created by: Kathryn MacDonald
- Developed by: Ron Saunders; Simon Hopkinson; Ian Munro
- Directed by: Ian Munro
- Voices of: Warwick Rimmer; Pippa Grandison
- Theme music composer: Barbara Griffin; Frances Latu Harper
- Opening theme: "It's New MacDonald's Farm" performed by Kristy Peters
- Ending theme: "It's New MacDonald's Farm" (instrumental)
- Composer: Jay Somerville-Collie
- Country of origin: Australia
- Original language: English
- No. of seasons: 3
- No. of episodes: 135

Production
- Production locations: QTQ, Brisbane, Queensland
- Running time: 30 mins
- Production companies: Beyond Productions; Nine Films and Television

Original release
- Network: Nine Network; Playhouse Disney
- Release: 12 April 2004 – 1 June 2007

New MacDonald's Farm is an Australian live-action children's television program that broadcast on the Nine Network from 12 April 2004 to 1 June 2007. This show and the Australian hit Hi-5 used to swap the timeslot in order to film new seasons. The series also aired on Playhouse Disney in Australia and New Zealand. The idea for the series was based on the book "A New Farm", written by Kathryn MacDonald.

== Premise ==
The show revolves around a farm in the country owned by Milly and Max and occupied by six farm animals: Henry the Horse, Daisy the Cow, Dash the Duck, Percy the Pig, Shirley the Sheep, and Charlotte the Hen. The show is aimed at pre-schoolers, and is of a light-hearted nature. It includes short sequences related to the show's plot, and sequences of singing and dancing with Max, Milly and some other children (who are older than pre-school age). Max is a forgetful, funny and energetic farm worker, who often gets his foot stuck in a bucket. Milly, on the other hand, is an intelligent, helpful and caring farmhand, who often helps Max out of his sticky situations. Each episode is half an hour long.

The name of the show suggests that it was inspired by the classic children's song Old McDonald Had a Farm.

== Production ==
The series was developed by Simon Hopkinson, Ron Saunders was well known as the creator of Spellbinder and Johnson and Friends and Ian Munro who also directed Hi-5, Bananas in Pyjamas, Johnson and Friends, Magic Mountain, Cushion Kids and Toybox.

Animatronic designer and puppeteer Ian James Colmer, who also plays the voice of Charlotte the Hen, now runs a film production company Destiny Pictures (www.destinypictures.net).

Charlotte the Hen got her name from a competition winner named Charlotte with initial S.

The farm is tying into the title's name "New McDonald's Farm". The logo (on the entrance to the farm) is a yellow sun with the title name on it (in yellow, blue and orange. A running gag is that whenever the sign falls down, Max is desperate to fix it. The "Song of the Day" segment is after the intro of the show.

Max and Milly are played by 3 Brisbane actors and one actor from Britain, Tim Mager, Nikki Payten, Heidi Luchterhand and John Tobias who wear large foam and fabric costumes with animatronic heads. The controls are very simple and involve servo motors to actuate the eye blink, eye turn and mouth open and close. This is a very basic system, which relies on the character performers off-screen to watch and listen to the pre-recorded audio track, and try to sync the mouth movement.

The animals are cable-controlled and have limited movement, sometimes requiring the performers to pick them up and physically move them around to create the illusion of life.

Inside their suits, Tim, Nikki, Heidi and John must wear cold vests, which are made of a gel. These are frozen, and then slowly thaw out as the actors wear them. The suits are extremely hot to wear.

After the first season, James Colmer was commissioned to re-design and re-build all the head animatronics, making them lighter, stronger, and easier to maintain. A full kilogram of weight was shaved off, by the use of lightweight aluminium.

For the third season they were re-designed and re-built again, this time by Dan Carlisle. These heads proved to be the most reliable and actor friendly. They required next to no maintenance and were much lighter compared to the heads of the first and second series. The new mechanisms also provided a much greater range of movement.

== Series overview ==
| Series | Episodes | Originally released | |
| Series | Episodes | First released | Last released |
|---|---|---|---|
| 1 | 45 | 12 April 2004 | 11 June 2004 |
| 2 | 45 | 26 September 2005 | 25 November 2005 |
| 3 | 45 | 2 April 2007 | 1 June 2007 |

== Episodes ==
=== Series 1 (2004) ===
| No. overall | No. in series | Song of the Week | Original release date |
|---|---|---|---|
| 1 | 1 | How Many Animals? | 12 April 2004 |
| 2 | 2 | How Many Animals? | 13 April 2004 |
| 3 | 3 | How Many Animals? | 14 April 2004 |
| 4 | 4 | How Many Animals? | 15 April 2004 |
| 5 | 5 | How Many Animals? | 16 April 2004 |
| 6 | 6 | A Farmer's Work | 19 April 2004 |
| 7 | 7 | A Farmer's Work | 20 April 2004 |
| 8 | 8 | A Farmer's Work | 21 April 2004 |
| 9 | 9 | A Farmer's Work | 22 April 2004 |
| 10 | 10 | A Farmer's Work | 23 April 2004 |
| 11 | 11 | You're My Friend | 26 April 2004 |
| 12 | 12 | You're My Friend | 27 April 2004 |
| 13 | 13 | You're My Friend | 28 April 2004 |
| 14 | 14 | You're My Friend | 29 April 2004 |
| 15 | 15 | You're My Friend | 30 April 2004 |
| 16 | 16 | Milkshake Shake | 3 May 2004 |
| 17 | 17 | Milkshake Shake | 4 May 2004 |
| 18 | 18 | Milkshake Shake | 5 May 2004 |
| 19 | 19 | Milkshake Shake | 6 May 2004 |
| 20 | 20 | Milkshake Shake | 7 May 2004 |
| 21 | 21 | Drip Drop Song | 10 May 2004 |
| 22 | 22 | Drip Drop Song | 11 May 2004 |
| 23 | 23 | Drip Drop Song | 12 May 2004 |
| 24 | 24 | Drip Drop Song | 13 May 2004 |
| 25 | 25 | Drip Drop Song | 14 May 2004 |
| 26 | 26 | Farmyard Party Time | 17 May 2004 |
| 27 | 27 | Farmyard Party Time | 18 May 2004 |
| 28 | 28 | Farmyard Party Time | 19 May 2004 |
| 29 | 29 | Farmyard Party Time | 20 May 2004 |
| 30 | 30 | Farmyard Party Time | 21 May 2004 |
| 31 | 31 | Night & Day | 24 May 2004 |
| 32 | 32 | Night & Day | 25 May 2004 |
| 33 | 33 | Night & Day | 26 May 2004 |
| 34 | 34 | Night & Day | 27 May 2004 |
| 35 | 35 | Night & Day | 28 May 2004 |
| 36 | 36 | You Never Can Tell | 31 May 2004 |
| 37 | 37 | You Never Can Tell | 1 June 2004 |
| 38 | 38 | You Never Can Tell | 2 June 2004 |
| 39 | 39 | You Never Can Tell | 3 June 2004 |
| 40 | 40 | You Never Can Tell | 4 June 2004 |
| 41 | 41 | In the Country | 7 June 2004 |
| 42 | 42 | In the Country | 8 June 2004 |
| 43 | 43 | In the Country | 9 June 2004 |
| 44 | 44 | In the Country | 10 June 2004 |
| 45 | 45 | In the Country | 11 June 2004 |

=== Series 2 (2005) ===
| No. overall | No. in series | Song of the Week | Original release date |
|---|---|---|---|
| 46 | 1 | Max's Tractor | 26 September 2005 |
| 47 | 2 | Max's Tractor | 27 September 2005 |
| 48 | 3 | Max's Tractor | 28 September 2005 |
| 49 | 4 | Max's Tractor | 29 September 2005 |
| 50 | 5 | Max's Tractor | 30 September 2005 |
| 51 | 6 | Hide and Seek | 3 October 2005 |
| 52 | 7 | Hide and Seek | 4 October 2005 |
| 53 | 8 | Hide and Seek | 5 October 2005 |
| 54 | 9 | Hide and Seek | 6 October 2005 |
| 55 | 10 | Hide and Seek | 7 October 2005 |
| 56 | 11 | Picnic | 10 October 2005 |
| 57 | 12 | Picnic | 11 October 2005 |
| 58 | 13 | Picnic | 12 October 2005 |
| 59 | 14 | Picnic | 13 October 2005 |
| 60 | 15 | Picnic | 14 October 2005 |
| 61 | 16 | Play with the Animals | 17 October 2005 |
| 62 | 17 | Play with the Animals | 18 October 2005 |
| 63 | 18 | Play with the Animals | 19 October 2005 |
| 64 | 19 | Play with the Animals | 20 October 2005 |
| 65 | 20 | Play with the Animals | 21 October 2005 |
| 66 | 21 | We Love Dancing | 24 October 2005 |
| 67 | 22 | We Love Dancing | 25 October 2005 |
| 68 | 23 | We Love Dancing | 26 October 2005 |
| 69 | 24 | We Love Dancing | 27 October 2005 |
| 70 | 25 | We Love Dancing | 28 October 2005 |
| 71 | 26 | Smile | 31 October 2005 |
| 72 | 27 | Smile | 1 November 2005 |
| 73 | 28 | Smile | 2 November 2005 |
| 74 | 29 | Smile | 3 November 2005 |
| 75 | 30 | Smile | 4 November 2005 |
| 76 | 31 | Hop, Skip and Jump | 7 November 2005 |
| 77 | 32 | Hop, Skip and Jump | 8 November 2005 |
| 78 | 33 | Hop, Skip and Jump | 9 November 2005 |
| 79 | 34 | Hop, Skip and Jump | 10 November 2005 |
| 80 | 35 | Hop, Skip and Jump | 11 November 2005 |
| 81 | 36 | Sing | 14 November 2005 |
| 82 | 37 | Sing | 15 November 2005 |
| 83 | 38 | Sing | 16 November 2005 |
| 84 | 39 | Sing | 17 November 2005 |
| 85 | 40 | Sing | 18 November 2005 |
| 86 | 41 | Helping Things Grow | 21 November 2005 |
| 87 | 42 | Helping Things Grow | 22 November 2005 |
| 88 | 43 | Helping Things Grow | 23 November 2005 |
| 89 | 44 | Helping Things Grow | 24 November 2005 |
| 90 | 45 | Helping Things Grow | 25 November 2005 |

== Awards and nominations ==
List of awards and nominations received by New MacDonald's Farm
| Award | Year | Recipient(s) and nominee(s) | Category | Result | Ref. |
|---|---|---|---|---|---|
| APRA Screen Music Awards | 2004 | Jay Somerville-Collie | Best Music for Children's Television | Nominated | |
| APRA Screen Music Awards | 2004 | Barbara Griffin and Latu Harper (for "EE II EE II OO (New MacDonald's Farm Theme)" | Best Television Theme | Nominated | |

== Home video releases ==
Compilation home video releases were been distributed on VHS and DVD in Australia by Roadshow Entertainment.

| Series | DVD Title | Release Date (Region 4) | Songs of the Week | Ref. |
|---|---|---|---|---|
| 1 | A Farmer's Work is Never Done | 2004 | A Farmer's Work; You're My Friend; How Many Animals? | |
| 1 | Farmyard Party Time | 9 September 2004 | Drip Drop Song; Milkshake Shake; Farmyard Party Time | |
| 1 | Fun in the Country | 17 March 2005 | In the Country; You Never Can Tell; Night & Day | |
| 2 | Play with the Animals | 30 November 2005 | Picnic; Hide and Seek; Play with the Animals | |
| 2 | Max's Tractor | 1 March 2006 | Max's Tractor; Hop, Skip and Jump | |
| 2 | Fantastic Farmers | 4 May 2006 | Helping Things Grow; Smile | |
| 2 | Barnyard Boogie | 6 July 2006 | We Love Dancing; Sing | |
| 3 | Animals to the Rescue | 7 March 2007 | I Just Wanna Clap My Hands; Dig It; The Colours Game | |
| 3 | Max and Milly's Country Show | 4 July 2007 | Max and Milly's Country Show; Harvest Ho-down | |
| 3 | I Can Fix Anything | 7 November 2007 | I Can Fix Anything At All; Turn Off the Tap | |
| 3 | Farmyard Friends | 5 June 2008 | Living on the Farm; Creepy Crawly Critters | |

== Other media ==
The series released two albums in 2004 & 2006, numerous books, live shows and other merchandise.

All songs for the show are provided by a team of writers from Sony/ATV Music Publishing. Recording & production of all music is done by Jay Somerville-Collie, who is also known for his performance, songwriting and production work in the popular country/rock/pop band, Jonah's Road.
