= Ron Saunders (producer) =

Australian film and television producer

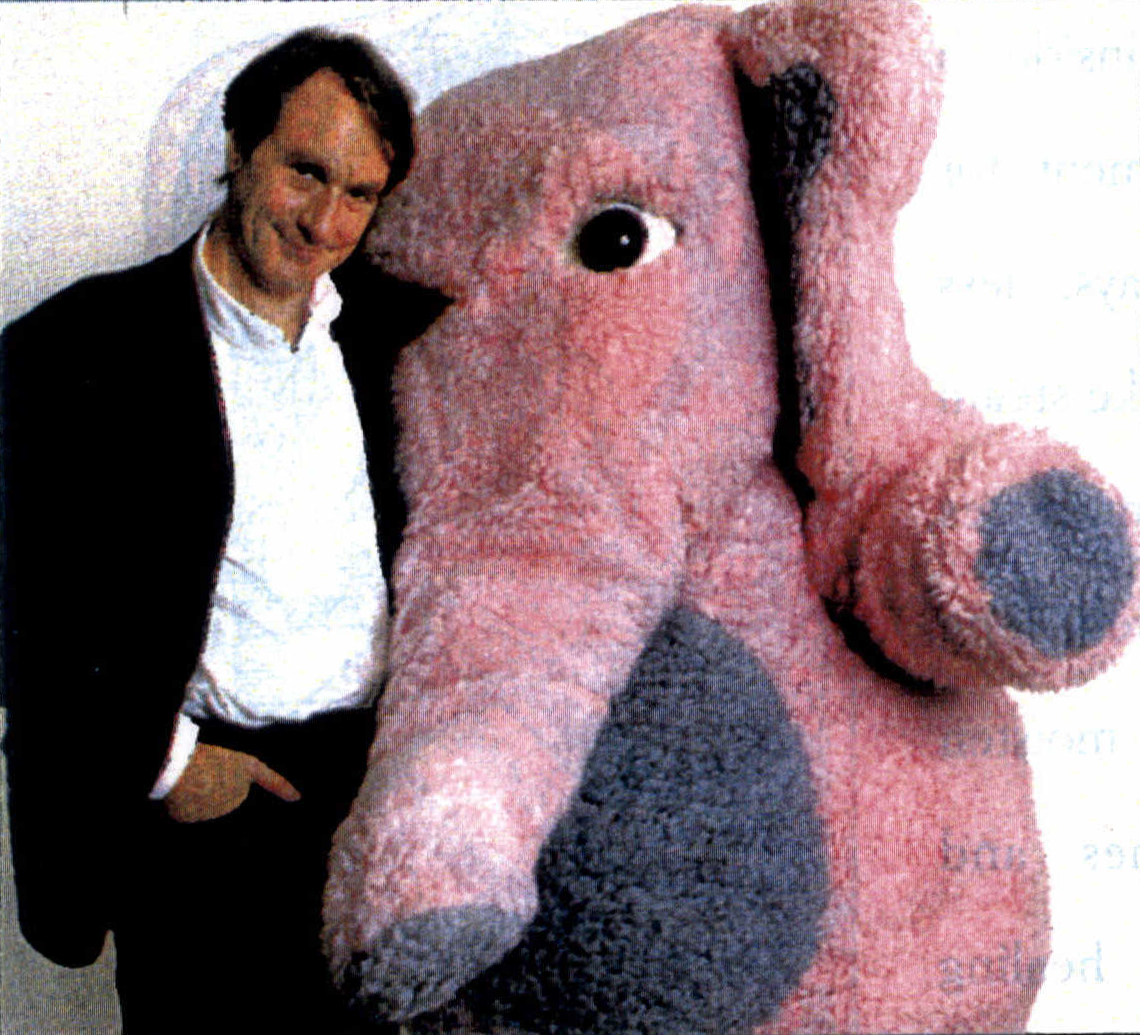
- Saunders with Johnson the Pink Elephant from Johnson and Friends.
- Born: Ronald Victor Saunders; South Australia, Australia
- Occupations: Film and television producer
- Years active: 1973–2017
- Known for: Producing and co-creating Johnson and Friends and Magic Mountain.

Ronald Victor Saunders is an Australian film and television producer, writer, and director. He has worked in almost every genre of film and his career has spanned over 30 years. He is particularly known for specialising in children's television and for co-creating the successful Australian children's television series Johnson and Friends, with director Ian Munro and writer John Patterson.

Saunders was also instrumental in building race relations between Australia and China, and he has been responsible for many co-productions between the two countries, including Magic Mountain, Spellbinder: Land of the Dragon Lord, and The Dragon Pearl. Other children's programs he was involved with include The Adventures of Sam, and the 1990s version of The Toothbrush Family, Ketchup: Cats Who Cook.

== Early life and education ==
Ronald Victor Saunders was born in South Australia. His father was a Protestant minister and the family travelled from town to town until Saunders was 18, when the family settled in Adelaide. He did not have a television as a child, and recalls that in his early childhood years, it was a common occurrence for 20-30 people to gather by the window of a hardware shop simply to watch whatever was on the television on display.

Saunders studied at Flinders University before starting work as a school teacher, teaching science and maths, but found it unfulfilling. Flinders had started the very first course in film and television, but in those days, it was not considered possible to make a living out of TV and film production. He later reconnected with some of his friends from university who had undertaken the film and television course, and together they made various independent and amateur films. This was the beginning of a new hobby.

Martin Fabinyi encouraged Saunders to apply for the very first film course at Australian Film, Television and Radio School in 1973, and his application was accepted along with 11 other students. Saunders attended the course with the likes of Gillian Armstrong, Phillip Noyce, Chris Noonan, and Graham Shirley.

== Career ==
After graduating, Ron ended up working for the South Australian Film Corporation. While working here, he wrote, directed or produced roughly fifty films within five years. A lot of his early work was in training and educational films. He has said that this part of his career was instrumental in teaching him how to get information across to other people. These included anti-discrimination films, and films that taught teachers how to deal with working class students when coming from a different environment. Saunders says that he loved filmmaking so much that he made it his primary source of income, and at the time, even if it only just paid the bills, he was happy with that. Saunders cites Terry Jennings and Scott Hicks as doing the same.

Saunders was brought on to co-produce Run, Chrissie, Run! in 1984. This was his first feature film credit. This was followed by Fair Game (directed by Mario Andreacchio), which has been cited by Quentin Tarantino as one of his favourite films in the 2008 documentary Not Quite Hollywood. It was at this point that Saunders moved to Sydney and started a new career at Film Australia after receiving a job offer. He was one of their in-house executive producers and served in this position for many years.

In 1989, Saunders stumbled upon footage of a puppetry troupe being edited for a documentary film in one of the edit suites at Film Australia. The puppetry troupe featured a large scale truck puppet which gave Saunders the idea of a scaled up puppetry series in which toys come to life. He teamed up with director Ian Munro to bring this idea to life, and after cycling through many writers, they found John Patterson - who impressed them immediately with his trial script. Patterson developed the characters and their personalities from the ground up. The series was conceived under the name Puppets - and then later Toytime, among other names, before being changed to Johnson and Friends. After going to air on the ABC in 1990, Johnson and Friends became very successful and spawned four series. This marked Saunders's move into children's television and was also the beginning of his frequent collaborations with director Ian Munro who he continued to work with until 2013.

Other children's programs Saunders worked on at Film Australia include The Girl from Tomorrow, The Girl from Tomorrow Part II: Tomorrow's End, Spellbinder, Spellbinder: Land of the Dragon Lord, Escape from Jupiter and Return to Jupiter. Saunders has said that the believes the best children's television has real subtext and that producers have an obligation to be aware of what they are putting into their shows, specifically unideal role models for children and he was very conscious of this on every kids show he was involved with.

It was here that Saunders developed an interest in coproductions with Japan and China. When Johnson and Friends sold to Fuji TV, Saunders's interest was piqued and he promptly entered into a co-production agreement to produce Escape from Jupiter (with NHK) and Johnson and Friends series three (with Fuji TV). The seven part documentary series Mini Dragons (produced in 1993) was another co-production via Film Australia, with South Korea, Taiwan, Hong Kong, Singapore, Malaysia, Thailand and Indonesia becoming involved.

== Collaborations with China ==
In 1994, Saunders, then employed at Film Australia and Zoe Wang, a translator hired on a contract basis, travelled to Beijing to meet Yu Pei Xia, director of CCTV’s youth and children’s department, who was willing to enter into a partnership. At the World Summit for Children and Television in Melbourne, Yu spoke at length with Saunders, stating that CCTV was very enthusiastic to do the co-production and was particularly interested in doing a preschool full-body costume series, such as Johnson and Friends by Film Australia and Bananas in Pyjamas by the ABC.

In 1995, Ron accepted a job offer with Southern Star and made arrangements to leave Film Australia. He was allowed to continue supervising work on the fourth series of Johnson and Friends as well as a few other series. He continued to develop a concept for a coproduction with CCTV while at Southern Star, this project is what eventually became Magic Mountain.

With proposals in hand for a preschool series and a drama, Saunders and Claire Henderson from the ABC flew to Beijing to spend three days with Yu Pei Xia and his staff. CCTV liked the suggestion for the preschool show featuring suited characters in a magic setting. Xu Xiong Xiong, general manager of the China Television Program Agency of CCTV; Neil Balvanes, managing director, Southern Star; and Ian McGarrity, acting head of television, Australian Broadcasting Corporation, then signed a memorandum of understanding for the co-production.

To ensure a balanced partnership, Australia agreed to handle design and scripting, while China built the sets and produced the show. The project had a director from China (Li Lei) and two from Australia; Ian Munro and Paul Faint.

By early 1996, the Australian parties had written storylines for 20 episodes and first drafts for a half-dozen. Saunders and Henderson worked to complete all storylines, final designs and first drafts for episodes 1 to 12 to show to a delegation of about six CCTV staff, including Yu, who visited Sydney in May that year. Later that year, Ian Munro, Ron Saunders, Claire Henderson and the character designers flew to China to audition cast members for the full body costumes.

Shooting began in September, and the 26 x 10 minute episodes began screening on the ABC in 1997. A second series of Magic Mountain was produced the following year as the set had not been taken down yet. While Paul Faint reprised his role as director, Ian Munro was unable to return for the second series and was replaced by Di Drew and David Evans, who had previously directed episodes of Bananas in Pyjamas, much like Munro and Faint.

The coproduction of Magic Mountain was the beginning of a great relationship between China and Australia's television and film industries, and many other productions eventuated from this relationship, including hoopla doopla! which was also produced by Saunders in association with the ABC and the Australian Children's Television Foundation and The Dragon Pearl which was the first treaty co-production between Australia and China.

== Later career ==
Saunders worked for many other broadcasting organisations and at one stage was head of television for ABC TV and managing director of Yoram Gross EM-TV. He joined Beyond International in 2001 and managed Pacific & Beyond, a joint venture company of Beyond. He was later appointed general manager for Beyond Screen Production, the division of Beyond which includes children and adult drama, game shows, specialist factual programs and sport.

Some of the programs he produced include New MacDonald's Farm, Milly, Molly, Double Trouble, Lab Rats Challenge, Toybox, Quest and Pulse, many of which were collaborations with director Ian Munro.

== Selected film and television credits ==
- Ten Minutes (1973)
- The Incredibly Magic Super Fantastic Library Resource Centre Kit (1974)
- Teaching Reading in the Upper Primary School (1974)
- Only Two Wheels (1974)
- An Open Space Secondary School at Work (1974)
- Yorke Peninsula (1975)
- The Expressive Arts: Everyone Succeeds! (1975)
- Violoncello and Double Bass (1975)
- Violin and Viola (1975)
- Untuned Percussion (1975)
- Tuned Percussion (1975)
- Trumpet and Cornet (1975)
- Trombone and Tuba (1975)
- The French Horn (1975)
- Olga de Amaral (1975)
- Oboe and Coranglais (1975)
- Flute and Piccolo (1975)
- Clarinet and Bass Clarinet (1975)
- Bassoon and Contrabassoon (1975)
- Basic Music Techniques (1975)
- Getting it all Together: The Mansfield Park Pre-School (1975)
- A Reason to Read (1975)
- A Conceptual Approach to Teaching (1975)
- What About Alcohol' (1976)
- Water Management (1976)
- The Great Coastal Dune Show (1976)
- Outback Festivals of Australia (1976)
- Less Hours Working (1976)
- I Taught Them But They Didn't Learn (1976)
- The Fourth Wish (1976)
- Leisure (1976)
- The Conductor: Parts 1 & 2 (1977)
- The Conductor: Part 1 (1977)
- The Conductor: Part 2 (1977)
- It's Easy When You Know How (1977)
- Bridging the Gap (1977)
- This Little Pig Went to Market (1977)
- Moments in Time (1977)
- Misconceptions (1977)
- How to Gromble a Flub (1977)
- Wheat Today (1978)
- Wheat Australia (1978)
- Noise Annoys (1978)
- I Hate Holidays (1978)
- Hector's Roadshow (1978)
- It's the Quality That Counts (1978)
- An Approach to Infant Education (1978)
- The Great Grain Robbery (1979)
- Pesticides: Friend or Foe' (1979)
- First Days (1979)
- You Can't Always Tell (1979)
- The Cubbies (1979)
- Art Makes People (1980)
- The Care We Take (1980)
- The Parks: A Community Centre (1981)
- Drugs: It's Up to You Really (1981)
- The Janet Gardiner Case: Forensic Science at Work (1981)
- The Great Artesian Basin (1981)
- Staying Alive (1981)
- Bush Corridors (1981)
- Braking and Balance: Motor Cycle Safety (1981)
- Fatty and George (1981)
- Home is Where You Live (1982)
- Just the Job (1982)
- The Teacher and Technology (1982)
- Dangermen (1982)
- Cityscape (1982)
- Taken by Storm (1983)
- Parent Involvement in Schools (1983)
- Break-In (1983)
- When Initiation Stopped, History Stopped (1984)
- Run Chrissie Run! (1984)
- Fair Game (1986)
- Mary Mackillop (1987)
- The Australians (1987-1988)
- Fever (1988)
- Out of Control (1988)
- Alice (1989)
- Johnson & Friends (1990) [Series 1]
- The Girl from Tomorrow (1990)
- The Girl from Tomorrow (1990) [Telemovie]
- Johnson & Friends (1991) [Series 2]
- Act of Necessity (1991)
- The Girl from Tomorrow Part II: Tomorrow's End (1991)
- The Girl from Tomorrow Part II: Tomorrow's End (1991) [Telemovie]
- People of Parliament (1991)
- After the Warming (1991)
- Photographers of Australia: Dupain, Sievers, Moore (1992)
- Who Killed Malcolm Smith' (1992)
- Australian Biography (1992) [Series 1]
- A Place to Belong (1992)
- Australian Biography (1993) [Series 2]
- Village of Jars (1993)
- Mini Dragons (1993)
- Dream House (1993)
- Johnson & Friends (1994) [Series 3]
- Escape from Jupiter (1994)
- Escape from Jupiter (1994) [Telemovie]
- Flowers and the Wide Sea (1994)
- Johnson & Friends (1995) [Series 4]
- Gorgeous (1994)
- Napoleon (1995)
- Spellbinder (1995)
- Sun on the Stubble (1996)
- Return to Jupiter (1997)
- Spellbinder: Land of the Dragon Lord (1997)
- The Adventures of Sam (1997)
- Ketchup: Cats Who Cook (1997)
- Magic Mountain (1997)
- The Toothbrush Family (1998)
- Wild China (1998)
- Backyard Science (2003)
- New MacDonald's Farm (2004) [Series 1]
- Rustbuckets (2004)
- Australians at Work (2005)
- New MacDonald's Farm (2006) [Series 2]
- New MacDonald's Farm (2007) [Series 3]
- Emerald Falls (2008)
- Lab Rats Challenge (2008)
- Double Trouble (2008)
- Toybox (2010) [Series 1]
- The Silent Epidemic (2010)
- Toybox (2011) [Series 2]
- The Dragon Pearl (2011)
- Toybox (2012) [Series 3]
- Toybox (2013) [Series 4]
- hoopla doopla! (2014)
- Buzz Bumble (2014)
- Quest (2014)
- Prison Songs (2015)
- Manny Lewis (2015)
- Blood and Thunder: The Sound of Alberts (2015)
- Beat Bugs (2016)
- Fanshaw & Crudnut (2016)
- Fanshaw & Crudnut - Attack of the Slug Santas (2016)
- Pulse (2017)
- Nyoongar Footy Magic (2017)
- Indigo Lake (2017)
- Motown Magic (2018)
- Backburning (2020)
