= John Patterson (screenwriter) =

Australian screenwriter

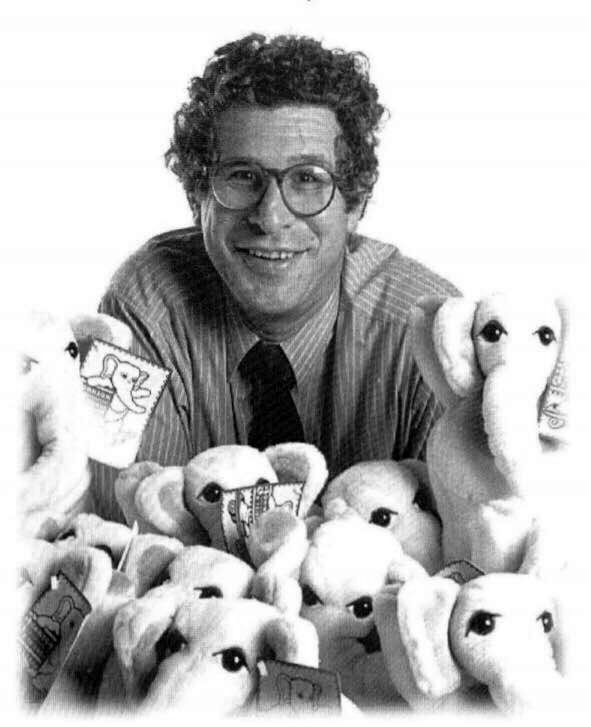
- Patterson with plush toys from Johnson and Friends - one of his creations
- Born: John Carne Patterson; 1949; Tasmania, Australia
- Died: 6 February 2016 (aged 66–67)
- Occupations: Screenwriter, lyricist, playwright, children's author
- Years active: 1977–2016
- Known for: Writing and co-creating Johnson and Friends and Boffins

John Carne Patterson (1949 – 6 February 2016) was an Australian screenwriter, lyricist, playwright and children's author. He is known for co-creating the Australian children's television series Johnson and Friends, with Ian Munro (director) and Ron Saunders (producer). Munro and Patterson also co-created Boffins and Patterson has written for other children's series including Fatty and George, Escape from Jupiter, the 1990s version of The Toothbrush Family, New MacDonald's Farm and Toybox. He also co-wrote the successful Australian drama film Annie's Coming Out.

== As a children's author ==
John Patterson wrote several books based on the Johnson and Friends series. These were published through ABC Books.

They include:

- Beginnings (based on the television story of the same name, and the follow-up episode, Under the Bed. The book features photographic stills - this title was also translated and published in Japan)
- The Battle of the Bed (based on the television story of the same name, and the previous episode, Homeless. The book features photographic stills - this title was also translated and published in Japan)
- The Book of Letters (original story with illustrations)
- The Book of Numbers (original story with illustrations)
- Best of Friends (based on the television story of the same name with photographic stills)
- The Thing Outside (based on the television story of the same name with photographic stills)
- Windchimes (based on the television story of the same name with photographic stills)
- Sock Soup (based on the television story of the same name with photographic stills)
- The Flood (based on the television story of the same name with photographic stills)
- A Trip to the Moon (based on the television story of the same name with photographic stills)
- The Train Conductor (based on the television story of the same name with illustrations based on photographic stills)
- Johnson and Friends (self-titled board book with photographic stills)
- Best of Friends (republished edition with an audio cassette narrated by Paul Bertram)

== Death and legacy ==
On 6 February 2016, Patterson was swimming at a beach in Coffs Harbour when he suffered a heart attack and drowned as a result.

The 2016 Logie Awards paid tribute to him in an 'In Memoriam' slideshow. He has also been remembered via a page on the Johnson and Friends fansite, "Michael's Bedroom" which is run by long-time Johnson and Friends enthusiast, Joseph Marshall.

== Known film and television credits ==
- The Transport Game (1978)
- Olives Don't Float (1978)
- Noise Destroys (1978)
- I Hate Holidays (1978)
- Don't Be a Bloody Idiot (1978)
- The Automated Mariner (1979)
- Mrs Harding Teaches Resourcefully (1979) [As writer and production assistant]
- Land Use and Abuse (1979)
- Good Fellers (1979)
- Alcohol: The Problem with Drinking (1979)
- The Fitness Factor (1979) [As production assistant]
- ABC of Unions (1980)
- Fatty and George (1981)
- A Fish For All Seasons (1982)
- Annie's Coming Out (1984)
- Tasmania: Free Enterprise State (1985)
- Land of Hope (1986)
- Pals (1986)
- Out of Control (1988)
- Johnson and Friends (1990) [Series 1]
- Johnson and Friends (1991) [Series 2]
- Boffins (1993)
- Johnson and Friends (1994) [Series 3]
- Johnson and Friends (1995) [Series 4]
- Mystique of the Pearl (1996)
- The Toothbrush Family (1998)
- Letters from Felix (2002)
- The Nimbols (2004)
- New MacDonald's Farm (2004)
- Felix - Ein Hase auf Weltreise (2005)
- Der Mondbär (2007)
- Toybox (2010)
