= Prejudice (1989 film) =

- Written by: Pamela Williams
- Directed by: Ian Munro
- Starring: Patsy Stephen; Grace Parr
- Country of origin: Australia
- Original language: English

Production
- Producers: Pamela Williams; Tristram Miall
- Running time: 96 mins
- Production company: Film Australia

Original release
- Network: Nine Network
- Release: 10 February 1989

Prejudice, working title Harassed, is a 1989 television film about two women who go to the Anti-Discrimination Board. It was one of a series of TV movies about social issues made by Film Australia with the Nine Network. This docu-drama looks at sexual harassment and racial discrimination. The lead actresses improvised based on scene outlines based on real accounts and acted along with real staff from the Anti-Discrimination Board.

== Plot ==
Jessica, the first female photographer on a metropolitan newspaper, is subjected to sexual harassment. Leticia, a Filipino nurse, is overlooked for a promotion and has her qualifications disregarded by her employers.
