= Custody (1988 film) =

- Written by: Ian Munro
- Directed by: Ian Munro
- Starring: Judith Stratford
- Country of origin: Australia
- Original language: English

Production
- Producer: Tristram Miall
- Running time: 92 mins
- Production company: Film Australia

Original release
- Network: Nine Network
- Release: 18 May 1988

Custody is a 1988 Australian TV docudrama about a child custody battle. It was filmed over three weeks in a semi-improvisational style. Custody was filmed with a mixture of actors and real staff from the family law system. The story was built from real cases. There was no script and actors workshopped their characters beforehand and role played their parts. None of the participants was aware of the result until the Judge gave his verdict. Richard Coleman of The Sydney Morning Herald called it "exceptionally good television". Kathe Boehringer in Filmnews writes "The result is a remarkable hybrid, but whatever it is – a fiction film with a documentary feel? faction? a docu-drama? — you won't be able to stop watching."

== Cast ==
- Judith Stratford as Christine Byrne
- Peter Browne as Andrew Byrne
- Michael Cudlin as Justin Byrne
- Sheridan Murphy as Cathy Byrne
- Peter Carroll as Narrator
