= Kid Detectives =

Australian television series

- Genre: Education
- Written by: Alison Peters; Alison Leigh; Rodney Long
- Directed by: Ian Munro
- Starring: Shae Brewster; Stephen Multari
- Composer: Alex Salter
- Country of origin: Australia
- Original language: English
- No. of series: 1
- No. of episodes: 26

Production
- Running time: 30 min
- Production company: Beyond Productions Pty Ltd.

Original release
- Network: Seven Network
- Release: 7 August 2009 – 2009

Kid Detectives is an Australian children's television program produced by Beyond Productions Pty Ltd. It was initially shown on the Seven Network. The show was run either as 26 episodes that ran 30 minutes, or as 52 episodes of 15 minutes. OKTV Singapore acquired the show to air in 2009.

== Premise ==
Mimicking the Backyard Science television series' format, Kid Detectives sought to encourage children to solve mysteries with forensic science. Each episode is divided into four separate mini-narratives. Between the stories are host segments featuring Stephen Multari and Shae Brewster, information about how professionals solve crimes, as well as fun facts.

== Episodes ==
Episode 1 "Spilt Milk Splatter"

- Diamond Switching Fraud: Ellie and Isabelle decide to go undercover to find out if the diamonds Jake is selling are real.
- Spilt Milk Splatter: Holly and Alex investigate a messy kitchen by studying the splash patters of spilt milk.
- Forensic Artwork: Bonnie sketched a portrait of a suspected school vandal.
- Feather Boa: Gabriel and Kip try to use a single feather left at the scene of a raided picnic.

Episode 2 "Bugged Office"

- Bugged Office: Brad and Liam search for radio waves to find out if Brad's mother's office has been bugged.
- T-shirt Jigsaw: Paige's room is trashed and she follows clues like strawberry jam and a torn shred of fabric.
- Skateboard Paint Chips: A park bench is ruined by a skateboarder, so Laura-Mae and Kenya set out to solve the mystery.
- Crushed Leaves: Charlotte and Otto find a clue in some fallen leaves that may help them find out who popped off the head of a beloved garden gnome.

Episode 3 "Barefoot Knock and Run"

- Document Shredder: A muffin business is threatened by a recipe thief, so China and Zoe use a shredded paper to solve the mystery.
- Barefoot Knock and Run: A door-knocking prankster interrupts Bonnie's TV time, but she uses maths and a footprint to figure out who it was.
- The Tiger Tagger: Luke and Jordan seek to identify the "Tiger Tagger" by mapping his tags around town.
- Trashed Pirate Hat: Cocoa discovers her pirate hat has been chewed. She uses the hair left behind to figure out which pet is guilty.

Episode 4 "Reconstructing A Face"

- Playground Shoe Print: Jessica and Sachin use an odd set of clues to figure out who trashed their favourite picnic spot.
- Fluoro Party: Spencer's MP3 player goes missing, and he identifies it because he's marked it with invisible ink that only shows up in ultraviolet light.
- Reconstructing A Face: Jake and Ellie find an animal skull on the beach, and they identify it by looking at the dental structure and using plasticine to rebuild its face.
- Diary Break In: Stella's diary has been broken into, so she and her friend Zoe investigate using tool mark analysis.

Episode 5 "All That Glitters"

- Estuary Algae: After Stephanie’s bike is stolen and dumped in the swamp, the Dawson boys are suspected, and Jake uses algae analysis to identify the thief.
- All That Glitters : Charlotte and Jelena ballet outfits are ruined before their recital, so they track down the guilty party by comparing glitter that was left behind under a microscope.
- Canteen Fingerprints: Imogen and Kip discover that fruit is missing in the canteen, but are able to collect fingerprints and track down the fruit in time for lunch.
- Truck Tyre Tracks: Bonnie discovers her mother's dahlia plant has been damaged, and she uses tracks to identify the remote controlled car that ran over them.

Episode 6 "The Lie Detector"

- Car Key Recovery: Louisa and Jessica use clues to identify who hid the car keys.
- The Lie Detector: Dad's chocolate stash has been raided, so Felix and Spencer interrogate suspects with their lie detector machine, in order to find out who stole their father's chocolate.
- Art Fraud: Holly and Sachin identify a fake painting favourite painting and discover the fraudster.
- Mystery Liquid: When a dog's drinking water is polluted, Anette and Harry use a homemade acid-alkaline test to determine the culprit.

Episode 7 "Sniffer Dog"

- Jed and Kenya discover that a coffee shop has been robbed. The kids use their dog's keen sense of smell to follow the thief's trail until the group finds the bag of stolen cash.
- Finley is hosting a poker game for chocolate coins, but someone is cheating. By looking for tells, he identifies the cheater.
- At the community garden, someone has stolen the chickens' eggs. Alex and Jake find a leaf on the lawn, which they compare to others' garden plots to eliminate suspects and find the egg poacher.
- Bethany and Morgan's house has been trashed, so the siblings take measurements and make a crime scene sketch to figure out that the culprit was their cat, Misty.

Episode 8 "Documentary Burglary"

- Document Burglary: There have been a spate of robberies in Brad and Ellie's salvage a near-ruined document that will lead them who has been committing robberies.
- Ice Cream Alibi: Someone spilled a scoop of ice cream on the kitchen floor and left it there, so Pnina and India-Blue determine the time of the crime and test the alibis of their suspects.
- Powder Footprints: The cellphone belonging to Charlotte's dad was stolen, so she and Zoe find clue (strange white powder) and track down the thief.
- Mr Beluga’s Marigolds: Mr Beluga's marigolds are destroyed and he blames Tinkerbell the cat. Jed and Otto aim to clear Tinkerbell's name by using pollen analysis.

Episode 9 "Metal Detector"

- Metal Detector: Someone has stolen precious coins from a hotel room, so China and Liam follow use closed-circuit television to uncover the buried treasure using a homemade metal detector.
- Bite Mark Biscuit: When cookies are stolen from the kitchen, Holly and Harry examine a bite mark and use dental details to solve the crime.
- Typewriter Love Notes: Someone has left a letter in India-Blue's locker, which contains a coded message; India-Blue and Laura-Mae matching the message with the typewriter used to write it to find the author.
- Animal Scat Patterns: Imogen and Stella investigate a banana that has been stolen, and animal droppings have been left behind.

Episode 10 "Band Mystery Sound"

- Band Mystery Sound: Anette and Jed recording a song when a piece of music equipment is stolen. The duo analyse the footsteps picked up by a microphone to find the thief.
- Asphalt Bike: Dean and Brandon suspect India-Blue has been pretending to be sick so she can play hooky and ride her bike. The boys analyse asphalt on her bike expose India-Blue's scam.
- Lip Print Trophy: Someone's left chocolate lip prints on the athletics trophy, so Brad and Laura-Mae secretly obtain lip prints from their suspects and identify the culprit.
- Cereal Box Insects: Bonnie and Brandon discover breakfast is contaminated by trails of sticky webs. A trip to the crime lab reveals the creepy-crawly culprit.

Episode 11 "Farm Gate Knot"

- Magic Paprika: Imogen rubs paprika on a paper to find evidence of musical sabotage, which leads to the culprit.
- Ear Print Eavesdropper: Someone has spoiled the Jelena's surprise party is spoiled, but Jessica and Luke find an ear print to check against their suspects.
- Farm Gate Knot: Jessica and Abraham discover someone has left the gate open and the cows have escaped; they analyse a knotted rope on the gate to find the culprit.
- Keyhole Spy Tool: Someone's been sneaking into Alex's room and taking things. Alex's favourite remote control helicopter has been stolen, and he tempts the thief to return while watching with a homemade fisheye lens.

Episode 12 "Bread Baker Thief"

- Forest Fire: Dean and Jelena discover their favourite forest spot has been badly burned, so use their detective skills to find out the cause was an unattended campfire.
- Ballistics Water Balloon: Spencer and Charlotte are attacked by a water bomber, whom they identify by working out the direction from which the missiles came.
- Bread Baker Thief: Someone stole Uncle Pierre’s scones, so Brad and Jessica track down the thief by putting flour under a microscope.
- Mystery Postcard: Alex and Dean analyse the handwriting on a cryptic postcard to find out who sent it.

Episode 13 "UFO Cow Abduction"

- Lying Witness: Dean and Brooke hunt for a pet-napper after Finley claims he rescued a missing dog, but they suspect that he may not be telling the truth.
- Perfumed Handkerchief: A secret recipe is stolen and a scented handkerchief leads Jed and Zoe to the thief.
- UFO Cow Abduction: Claire believes aliens abducted T-Bone the calf, but the truth turns out to be more mundane.
- Lipstick Party: One of Helena's friends has left lipstick kiss marks all over her granddad's photo, and some analysis will reveal the culprit.

Episode 14 "Microbes"

- Water Decoy: Kenya and Laura-Mae create a fake person to lure out a water-bomber.
- Microbes: China and Stephanie use biological forensics to try to prove that Jordan didn't clean the shower when it was his responsibility.
- Fish Autopsy: A fishmonger is not selling fresh fish, so Ellie and Isabelle collect samples and perform some fish autopsies.
- Left-Handed Palm Print: Jake and Austin identify who left behind an ink stain on a mouse pad by comparing suspects' palm prints.

Episode 15 "Window Wash Fraud"

- Purse Thief: Photographers Charlotte and China are witness to a bag-snatching incident at a cross country running race. They study their photos and the seeds found on the competitors' clothing to get justice.
- Window Wash Fraud: Luke and his friends are washing windows to earn money, but one of them is ripping the others off. With thorough bookwork and a series neighbourhood enquiries, Luke uncovers the fraudster.
- Undercover Sting: Someone has vandalized the local park. Dean and Laura-Mae go undercover in a local skateboard gang to launch a sting operation.
- Fortune Cookie Fingerprint: Austin discovers that someone has stolen the notes inside fortune cookies, but a nail fragment leads him to the culprit.

Episode 16 "Messy Crime Photography"

- Moth Car Grill: Imogen and Pnina set about finding out who drove into a mailbox by using the analysis of insects stuck to neighbourhood cars.
- Trip Wire: Laura-Mae, Charlotte and Jed are shooting a horror film, someone has beaten all the biscuits in the dressing room. The filmmakers set up a secret camera to catch the culprit.
- Lighthouse Periscope Spies: The local lighthouse has been vandalized, so Claire and Jessica decide to catch the vandal using a homemade periscope.
- Messy Crime Photography: Jake and Finlay come across a horrible mess. They use a camera to record evidence at the crime scene, and a gold candy wrapper proves to be the evidence that breaks the case.

Episode 17 "Mystery Rock"

- Mystery Rock: When a rock smashes the birdbath, Jessica and Bonnie's investigation leads them to the museum.
- Telescope Stakeout: Someone’s been stealing Joel and Spencer's sun-dried tomatoes, so they build a telescope and conduct a stakeout.
- Stolen Wedding Dress: At the scene of a stolen wedding dress, white powder and a series of simple but ingenious chemical tests leads Brandan, Liam, and Bethany to the thief.
- Scuff Marks: Someone has spilled popcorn everywhere in the kitchen, and scuffmarks at the scene are a vital clue for Bonnie and Luke.

Episode 18 "Fish Out of Water"

- Fruit Shop Banana Skin: Jelena and Brandan solve the case of the missing mangoes thanks to a small piece of squashed banana found at the crime scene.
- Solar Powered Car: Anette and Kip look for who has stolen a model car collection, so they build a solar powered car as bait for the hijacker.
- Fish Out of Water: Holly and Jed find a dead fish by the lake and examine the body. They find teeth and beak marks, but conclude that a scrap of fishing net points to the real cause of death.
- Mystery Fabric Dye Test: A shirt covered in raspberry stains has been left in Jessica's bed. By testing how different materials respond to dye, Jessica closes in on the culprit.

Episode 19 "Airport Smugglers"

- False Free Range Eggs: Claire and Harry run a roadside stall selling free-range eggs, but a competitor is substituting store-bought eggs and claiming they're also free-range. The detectives create egg tests to unmask the unscrupulous competitor.
- Invisible Ink Heat: Jelena and Finlay planned on making a Key lime pie until someone stole the limes. By using an invisible ink test, they find that Ariana merely “borrowed” them for her own project.
- Airport Smugglers: Charlotte and Brandan use their powers of deduction to figure out who has been smuggling illegal goodies into the airport.
- Breadcrumb Trail: Jessica and Sachin follow a breadcrumb trail to identify who has stolen all the picnic rolls.

Episode 20 "Sawdust Trail"

- Sawdust Trail: Matt and Harrison search for stolen yacht blueprints. Luckily, the thief left behind traces of sawdust at the crime scene.
- Prize Plant Heist: Holly and Bethany seek to discover who might have snipped their Auntie's rare plant. They are able to identify the culprit because the shape of the cuts matches nearby cutting tools.
- Stolen Calligraphy: Someone has dishonestly displayed Anette’s work at a Calligraphy Exhibition, so Anette and Jake devise an ink test to find out who is the thief.
- Snail Trails: The snail bait has been stolen and Dad’s new lettuce patch has been eaten. Joel and Austin track down the thief thanks to the snail trails.

Episode 21 "Restaurant Thief"

- Missing Potatoes: Gran’s prize potatoes have been stolen, so Harrison and Kate follow telltale soil and use a fizzy soil test to find the culprit.
- Envelope Tampering: A busybody has tampered with Imogen's love notes, so Imogen and Sachin set a trap with a decoy letter and the analysis of glue patterns.
- Restaurant Thief: Laura-Mae and Zoe discover that someone has stolen the table vases. A black thread was at the scene, which the girls use to track down the thief.
- Scratched Boat: Imogen and Jed find out who left a huge scratch along Dad’s boat by using security camera footage and analysing how the suspects walks.

Episode 22 "Historic Diary"

- Cipher Wheel Mystery: Joel and Kenya are editing the school newspaper when they discover a series of symbols. The kids use a cipher wheel to decode the message.
- Rope Evidence: Dean and Ellie find a length of rope in their backyard and suspect someone was up to no good. They match the spliced rope to identify the intruder.
- Historic Diary: Anette and Luke are curious about a pioneer girl who mysteriously disappeared. Annette finds an old map and a secret diary, which allows her to solve the cold case: the girl ran away with her boyfriend.
- Counterfeit Money: Jelena, Brooke and Harry are playing a board game, and Harry never runs out of cash. The girls believe he’s been printing counterfeit money, so they use a microscope to differentiate the real and fake currency.

Episode 23 "Infra Red Fake Stamp"

- Illegal Fish Scales: Matt and Kate find an endangered fish in the fishing crates at the harbor. To find out who's been catching fish illegally, the kids study the fish scales.
- Double Trouble: A batch of muffins is missing, and Joel and Holly suspect the twins, Kate and Emma. They learn that even identical twins have unique fingerprints.
- Forest Grid Search: A group of friends plan an overnight camping trip but their dog, Sparky, has gone missing. Team leader Dean has a map and organises a grid search to find Sparky.
- Infra Red Fake Stamp: Brad suspects someone in his stamp collecting club is selling fakes, so he inspects stamps under a microscope with an angled light and finds the truth.

Episode 24 "Movie Theft"

- 3D Movie Theft: Holly and Alex go to a movie, but the hot dogs at the concession stand have been stolen. The two friends track down the thief before the movie begins.
- Mystery Boat Liquid: Jed and Imogen clean their boat, only to find muddy footprints on the deck. The culprit left a bottle of incriminating liquid behind.
- Go Kart Concealed Evidence: Jake and Isabelle are timekeepers at the go-kart track when they discover that a driver has altered the data to improve their pole position. The kids uncover the concealed evidence.
- Pet Detective: A pet rabbit has gone missing after someone left the cage door unlatched. Jessica and Dean find fur and rabbit poo, which leads them to the missing rabbit.

Episode 25 "Bowling Alley Break In"

- Rubbish Overboard: Claire and Abraham set out to discover who dumped rubbish in pristine Sandy Bay, and use under-water forensics to discover the culprit was a fisherman.
- Compost Decomposition: Dean finds that a bucketful of scraps has been left in the garden, instead of being properly dumped in the compost.
- Bowling Alley Break In: Someone steals money from the bowling alley cash register. With iron filings, a magnet and some black powder, Jelena and Jed find the perpetrator.
- Incriminating Glasses: Cocoa and Sachin are gearing up for an Intergalactic game when they discover that someone has made off with their Gamma Ray glasses. The game is on hold until the space cadets track down who the guilty interloper was.

Episode 26 "Sweet Shop Chromatography"

- Plastercast Crabbers : Jelena and Charlotte discover someone has been illegally catching crabs. Using their art supplies, the girls make a plaster cast of the poacher’s footprint.
- Leaf Veins: Stephanie and Jake are making pasta when they find that someone has put leaf prints in the fresh pasta. They solve the mystery by matching the prints with leaves on their suspect’s potted plants.
- Sweet Shop Chromatography: Holly and Jed are on the trail of someone who’s substituting sub-standard sweets at the candy factory. The friends work out which coloured food dye was used in the fake candy.
- Shipwreck Semaphore: Jelena and Anette find themselves stranded during their boating course, but get help with a combination of makeshift-semaphore flags and maritime signals.

== See also ==
- List of Australian television series
