= The Toothbrush Family =

Australian children's animated series

The Toothbrush Family is an Australian children's animated television series featuring a group of anthropomorphic personal-care supplies. The series was first aired in 1977. The final episode aired in 1999.

== Concept and production ==
Originally conceived by Marcia Hatfield of Australia as her son refused to brush his teeth. The stories were written by Marcia Hatfield, the screenplays by Al Guest and Jean Mathieson. Al Guest and Jean Mathieson produced and directed, creating the series at their Toronto studio Rainbow Animation. All voices were provided by Len Carlson and Billie Mae Richards.

The show later returned for a second series in 1998 (which was later doubled with another animated series Ketchup: Cats Who Cook) and focused on two new characters Molly and Max, along with three other characters, Susie Sponge, Flash Fluoride the toothpaste, and Countess de Comb. The theme song was sung by Kurt Elling.

It was written by John Patterson, produced by Ron Saunders, and directed by Craig Handley and produced by Southern Star Productions, Film Australia and Shanghai Animation Film Studio in association with Roymark Television.

== Plot ==
They are commonly remembered from the first series, where they came to life at night when the moon shone into the bathroom.

The main characters in the family were father Tom, mother Tess, the kids Tina and Toby, and Gramps. Also featured were other bathroom items: Flash Fluoride the toothpaste, Hot Rod Harry the electric toothbrush (portrayed as having wheels and a love of speed), Bert Brush, Cecily Comb, Nev Nailbrush, Susie Sponge, Shaggy Dog, Callie Conditioner and Sally Shampoo.

== Franchise and merchandise ==
The Toothbrush Family expanded to include two international television series, DVDs, CDs, videos, audio cassettes, publications, EP and LP record series.

== Telecast and home media ==
In the US, the show has been viewed on Captain Kangaroo along a revival aired on Pax (now as "Ion"), ABC Kids, Network Ten (1998 series only) and Nine Network in Australia, Cartoon Network in the United Kingdom and Ireland, TV Tokyo in Japan, YTV in Canada, Italia 1 in Italy, Spacetoon in Indonesia, and Almajd Kids in Saudi Arabia. In the late 1990s, Celebrity Home Entertainment released the show on both DVD and VHS. As of 2022, The show is now streaming on the premium Amazon Prime.
