= The Unknown Ocean =

1964 Australian documentary film

- Directed by: Malcolm Otton
- Produced by: Lee Robinson
- Production company: Commonwealth Film Unit
- Release date: 1964
- Running time: 27 min
- Country: Australia
- Language: English

The Unknown Ocean is a 1964 Australian documentary film directed by Malcolm Otton.
