= Boffins (TV series) =

Australian children's television series

- Title card for the series, seen at the beginning of every episode.
- Created by: John Patterson; Ian Munro
- Directed by: Ian Munro
- Opening theme: "Boffins" performed by Suzy Connolly
- Composer: Robert Moss
- Country of origin: Australia
- Original language: English
- No. of seasons: 1
- No. of episodes: 13

Production
- Producer: Chris Oliver
- Editor: Robin Archer
- Running time: 9.5 mins
- Production company: Film Australia

Original release
- Network: ABC Video
- Release: 17 April 1995

Boffins (also referred to as The Boffins) is an Australian children's television programme produced by Film Australia in 1993. It was created by John Patterson and Ian Munro, who also co-created Johnson and Friends. The series was never broadcast or picked up by a network within Australia. The ABC initially wanted to show it as part of their schools programming, but this never happened for unknown reasons. The series did air internationally and was translated into several languages, and within Australia, it was later released on home video by the ABC in 1995.

== Plot ==
Boffins follows the adventures of four tiny furry alien-like creatures known as Boffins, who spend their days in kitchen cupboards and surrounding areas, trying to discover the science behind how the world works, Madame Curie and Aristotle are very close to some of the answers, but Newton and Echo, the young boffins from the house next door are only interested in having fun!

The series was designed to introduce primary school children to some of the basic laws of science. Each episode explores a different concept; the transmission of sound, levers, pulleys, magnetism, gravity, siphons, evaporation, reflection and dispersion of light, friction, and requirements for growth.

== Characters ==
- Aristotle: Appropriately named after the Greek philosopher, Aristotle loves science, but is quite lazy, conceited and bossy. However, he has a good heart and a great sense of humour. Aristotle despises Galileo, as he is jealous of his inventions. He lives in the kitchen cupboard with Madame Curie.
- Madame Curie: Madame Curie lives in the kitchen cupboard with Aristotle. Despite being strict at times, she is quite caring and acts as a motherly figure to Newton and Echo. She is named after Polish physicist Marie Curie.
- Newton: Newton is a teenage boffin from the house next door, he has a dislike for science, matching the stereotype of people his age. He wears a red flat cap, and a yellow shirt featuring a peace symbol. Despite disliking science, he still visits the kitchen with Echo. He is, rather ironically, named after British physicist Sir Isaac Newton.
- Echo: Echo lives in the house next door with Newton. Compared to Newton, Echo is curious about science as opposed to directly disliking it. She wears a green shirt, with various symbols stitched onto it, and a skirt. She is named after the effect caused by the reflection of sound.
- Galileo: Galileo is Madame Curie's cousin, he lives in a kitchen cupboard in a house on the other side of town. He has invented various gadgets and machines which Aristotle is jealous of and he often sends them to Madame Curie, which infuriates Aristotle. Despite never physically appearing, he is frequently mentioned in various episodes. He is named after Italian physicist Galileo Galilei.
- Doris: Doris is Madame Curie's sister, who lives on the other side of town. She was only mentioned in the episode Wrong Number, in which she sends a letter to Madame Curie, prompting her to get a telephone. According to the letter, she lives with Galileo.

== Cast ==
Character	Costume actor	Voice actor
Aristotle	Peter Browne	Peter Browne
Madame Curie	Deborah Kennedy	Deborah Kennedy
Newton	James Caitlin; Troy Rowley	Zachery McKay
Echo	Kirsty McGregor	Kirsty McGregor

The costumes were built and designed by Studio Kite.

== Episodes ==
No.	Title	Scientific concept
1	"Wrong Number"	Transmission of Sound
Madame Curie demands a telephone so the Boffins investigate the nature of sound and make one of their own.
2	"No Entry"	Levers
The Boffins try to loosen the stuck kitchen tile and accidentally discover the power of levers.
3	"Over the Moon"	Pulleys
The Boffins try to move a huge box of cornflakes and discover how to use pulleys.
4	"Fridgestuff"	Magnetism
The Boffins set out to discover the source of a new secret force - magnetism.
5	"Upwards and Downwards"	Hypothesising
Aristotle and Madame Curie demonstrate the force of gravity, but they soon need the force of cleaning up as well!
6	"Life in the Balance"	Gravity
Newton is dangling dangerously off the kitchen bench and Aristotle saves him by discovering the centre of gravity.
7	"Water Water Everywhere"	Syphons
The young Boffins discover a "scientific" way of transporting water, they start a syphon but cannot stop it.
8	"The Disappearing Water"	Evaporation
The Boffins become scientific detectives to help Newton find his vanishing water - there is no thief, just evaporation.
9	"Let There Be Light"	Reflection of Light
The young Boffins try to collect light in a matchbox and find that they can't hold it. They discover how to reflect a beam of light.
10	"Feeling Blue"	Dispersion of Light
An experiment with prisms helps Aristotle and Madame Curie choose colours to paint their laboratory.
11	"Moving Matters"	Friction
In a desperate attempt to get rid of the dreaded Kendall's Kitchen Cleanser, the Boffins discover friction and a new sport - soap skating.
12	"The Miracle of Life"	Requirements for Growth
The young Boffins have trouble growing plants, until they discover the importance of light, water and soil.
13	"The Pledge"	-
Aristotle and Madame Curie set off on an expedition and Newton and Echo realise they have developed the ability to take charge of the scientific experiments.

== International broadcasts ==
Despite being relatively obscure and never airing in Australia, Boffins was broadcast in various countries around the world – including Singapore, Malaysia, Israel, Brunei, Pakistan, Sri Lanka, Canada, The Middle East, Africa and possibly elsewhere. It was also translated and dubbed into Hebrew, Malay and Portuguese, among other languages.

The series was also released in the United States and Canada as a set of educational videos, which were only available to schools and universities.

== Video releases ==
Three VHS tapes were released by ABC Video in 1995.

Title	Release date	Episodes
Volume 1 - Over the Moon (14935)	17 April 1995	Wrong Number, No Entry, Over the Moon and Fridgestuff
Volume 2 - Upwards and Downwards (14936)	17 April 1995	Upwards and Downwards, Life in the Balance, Water Water Everywhere and The Disappearing Water
Volume 3 - Let There Be Light (14937)	17 April 1995	Let There Be Light, Feeling Blue, Moving Matters, The Miracle of Life and The Pledge
