= Jay's Jungle =

- Genre: Children's television
- Created by: Jay Laga'aia; Monica O'Brien
- Directed by: Ian Munro
- Starring: Jay Laga'aia; Kenneth Moraleda; Emily McKnight; Courtney Stewart
- Opening theme: "Rumble Rumble (Jay's Jungle Theme)"
- Composers: Jay Laga'aia; Mark Walmsley; John Kane
- Country of origin: Australia
- Original language: English
- No. of series: 4
- No. of episodes: 255

Production
- Executive producer: Monica O'Brien
- Production locations: Fox Studio Australia, Sydney, New South Wales
- Production company: Ambience Entertainment

Original release
- Network: 7TWO
- Release: 12 January 2015 – 25 May 2018

Jay's Jungle is an Australian children's television show, which was broadcast every weekday on 7TWO from 12 January 2015 to 25 May 2018. The series was created and produced by Ambience Entertainment.

== Premise ==
Jay the lighthouse keeper lives inside a sentient lighthouse named C-MOR on a J-shaped island. C-MOR uses his light to seek out ideas and questions for the show's characters to explore. Supporting characters include the monkey Funk-E, marine biologist Tash, and park ranger Lani. Funk-E is part of a band called the Tree Top Trio, which includes fellow monkeys Jess-E and Leonard. The Jungle Crew, consisting of preschool-aged children, assists the main characters.

== Cast ==
- Jay Laga'aia as Jay
- Kenneth Moraleda as C-MOR, a sentient lighthouse
- Mat McCoy as Funk-E
- Emma De Vries as Jess-E
- Mal Heap and Mark Simpson as Leonard
- Courtney Stewart as Tash
- Emily McKnight as Lani
- Neila Manson as Tiny Dancer

== Episodes ==
=== Series 1 (2015) ===
No. overall	No. in season	Title	Original release date
1	1	"Sea Salty"	12 January 2015
2	2	"Food"	13 January 2015
3	3	"Dragon's Breath"	14 January 2015
4	4	"Eggs"	15 January 2015
5	5	"Clocks"	16 January 2015
6	6	"Bubbles"	19 January 2015
7	7	"I Can Play Anything"	20 January 2015
8	8	"Shadows and Shapes"	21 January 2015
9	9	"Where Does the Sun Go?"	22 January 2015
10	10	"Whales"	23 January 2015
11	11	"Rainbows"	26 January 2015
12	12	"Dinosaurs"	27 January 2015
13	13	"Plants Grow"	28 January 2015
14	14	"Flags"	29 January 2015
15	15	"Sky"	30 January 2015
16	16	"Stories"	2 February 2015
17	17	"I Say Hello Like This"	3 February 2015
18	18	"Breakfast"	4 February 2015
19	19	"Seeing Stars"	5 February 2015
20	20	"Feel Better Exercise"	6 February 2015
21	21	"Music"	9 February 2015
22	22	"Flying"	10 February 2015
23	23	"Flowers"	11 February 2015
24	24	"When I Throw Something"	12 February 2015
25	25	"Waste Not"	13 February 2015
26	26	"Thunder Grumbles"	16 February 2015
27	27	"Vegetables"	17 February 2015
28	28	"Seeds"	18 February 2015
29	29	"Winter"	19 February 2015
30	30	"Sleep"	20 February 2015
31	31	"Cooking"	23 February 2015
32	32	"Mistakes"	24 February 2015
33	33	"Feeling Happy"	25 February 2015
34	34	"Clouds"	26 February 2015
35	35	"Imaginative Play"	27 February 2015
36	36	"Floating and Sinking"	2 March 2015
37	37	"Milk"	3 March 2015
38	38	"Dark Scary"	4 March 2015
39	39	"Winning"	5 March 2015
40	40	"Cleanup"	6 March 2015
41	41	"Why Are Balls Round?"	9 March 2015
42	42	"Animal Talk"	10 March 2015
43	43	"Telling Tales"	11 March 2015
44	44	"Autumn"	12 March 2015
45	45	"Staying Clean"	13 March 2015
46	46	"In My Dreams I Can Fly"	16 March 2015
47	47	"Fast and Slow"	17 March 2015
48	48	"Careful"	18 March 2015
49	49	"Bees"	19 March 2015
50	50	"Where the Wind Blows"	20 March 2015
51	51	"Surprises"	23 March 2015
52	52	"Sharing"	24 March 2015
53	53	"What Animals Eat"	25 March 2015
54	54	"Sun Smart"	26 March 2015
55	55	"Hiding"	27 March 2015
56	56	"Imagination"	30 March 2015
57	57	"Pet Elephant"	31 March 2015
58	58	"Hot Weather"	1 April 2015
59	59	"Friends"	2 April 2015
60	60	"World's Biggest Animals"	3 April 2015
61	61	"Being Silly"	6 April 2015
62	62	"Why Can't I Do That?"	7 April 2015
63	63	"Springtime"	8 April 2015
64	64	"Feeling Sick is No Fun"	9 April 2015
65	65	"Paper Comes From"	10 April 2015

=== Series 2 (2016) ===
No. overall	No. in season	Title	Original release date
66	1	"The Weather Makes Me Feel Different"	4 January 2016
67	2	"I Love Playing in the Sand"	5 January 2016
68	3	"Why Does It Have to Rain?"	6 January 2016
69	4	"What is a Volcano?"	7 January 2016
70	5	"I Like to Cook"	8 January 2016
71	6	"Some of My Family Look Like Me!"	11 January 2016
72	7	"I Want to Learn to Read"	12 January 2016
73	8	"Why Do We Celebrate Different Things?"	13 January 2016
74	9	"Balancing is Very Tricky Sometimes"	14 January 2016
75	10	"I Love Getting Letters"	15 January 2016
76	11	"Why Don't Animals Live in Houses?"	18 January 2016
77	12	"I Have Five Senses"	19 January 2016
78	13	"My Cat Can See in the Dark"	20 January 2016
79	14	"Out of Reach"	21 January 2016
80	15	"Waiting for My Turn is Boring"	22 January 2016
81	16	"Kangaroos Have Pouches, Tigers Don't"	25 January 2016
82	17	"I Like Playing Shops"	26 January 2016
83	18	"I Like Jumping Over Waves!"	27 January 2016
84	19	"Why Do I Get Goosebumps?"	28 January 2016
85	20	"Why Do I Get Hiccups?"	29 January 2016
86	21	"Lots of Things Are Squares Shaped"	1 February 2016
87	22	"Animals Like Different Temperatures"	2 February 2016
88	23	"I Love Collecting Things"	3 February 2016
89	24	"How Do You Use Maps?"	4 February 2016
90	25	"Birthday Parties Are Lots of Fun!"	5 February 2016
91	26	"Why Do Seasons Change?"	8 February 2016
92	27	"Red Means Stop and Green Means Go"	9 February 2016
93	28	"I Wish I Can Whistle"	10 February 2016
94	29	"Listening Properly Takes a Lot of Concentration"	11 February 2016
95	30	"I Have Different Friends on Different Days"	12 February 2016
96	31	"Is the Moon Made Out of Cheese?"	15 February 2016
97	32	"My Dog Doesn't Wear Shoes"	16 February 2016
98	33	"I Like Being Loud!"	17 February 2016
99	34	"Running Fast and Walking Slow"	18 February 2016
100	35	"Some Things Smell Nice"	19 February 2016
101	36	"Why Do I Sometimes Run Out of Time?"	22 February 2016
102	37	"I Wear Hats Outside"	23 February 2016
103	38	"I Love Family Days"	24 February 2016
104	39	"Sometimes I Break Things"	25 February 2016
105	40	"Why Do Flowers Smell?"	26 February 2016
106	41	"I Love Mud"	29 February 2016
107	42	"I Like to Make Things Out of Paper"	1 March 2016
108	43	"I Dance When I'm Happy"	2 March 2016
109	44	"Why Do I Keep Growing?"	3 March 2016
110	45	"I Can Talk with My Hands"	4 March 2016
111	46	"Why Do I Have to Cut My Hair?"	7 March 2016
112	47	"Some Words Sound the Same"	8 March 2016
113	48	"I'm Bored with Being Bored"	9 March 2016
114	49	"I Like to Sing"	10 March 2016
115	50	"I'd Like to Be a Doctor"	11 March 2016
116	51	"Foods from Different Cultures"	14 March 2016
117	52	"Why Do I Have to Share?"	15 March 2016
118	53	"I Like How Things Feel"	16 March 2016
119	54	"Why Does the Earth Shake?"	17 March 2016
120	55	"I Like to Stretch"	18 March 2016
121	56	"Sometimes I Pretend to Be a Monster"	21 March 2016
122	57	"Sometimes I Forget Things"	22 March 2016
123	58	"Why Do Big People Go to Work?"	23 March 2016
124	59	"Sometimes I Feel Unhappy"	24 March 2016
125	60	"Some Things Change Colour"	25 March 2016
126	61	"Why Do I Have to Brush My Teeth?"	28 March 2016
127	62	"Some Fruits Grow on Trees and Some Don't"	29 March 2016
128	63	"Animals Can Do Amazing Things"	30 March 2016
129	64	"I Have Lots of Different Friends"	31 March 2016
130	65	"I Love to Dress Up as Different Characters"	1 April 2016

== Reception ==
Manning River Times called the show "a fun filled engaging rumble through a stylised jungle, where questions are asked and ideas explored through music, story and playful characters who captivate and inspire young minds".
