= Dogstar (TV series) =

Australian children's animated television program

- Created by: Doug MacLeod; Colin South; John Tatoulis
- Directed by: Aaron Davies
- Voices of: Kate McLennan; Brandon Burns; Emma Leonard; Beverley Dunn; Roslyn Oades; Henry Maas; Marg Downey; Matt Tilley; Simone Ray; Matthew King; Gary Files; Michael Veitch; Abbe Holmes
- Narrated by: Shaun Micallef
- Composer: Yuri Worontschak
- Country of origin: Australia
- No. of seasons: 2
- No. of episodes: 52

Production
- Executive producers: Colin South; Jo Horsburgh; Emma Fitzsimmons
- Producers: Colin South; Ross Hutchens
- Running time: 25 minutes

Original release
- Network: Nine Network
- Release: 4 September 2006 – 2011

Dogstar is an Australian animated television series produced by Media World Pictures which first screened on the Nine Network in 2006, and then Disney Channel Australia. There are 26 episodes in each season.

Dogstar was produced by Colin South and Ross Hutchens, written by Doug MacLeod and Philip Dalkin, designed by Scott Vanden Bosch and directed by Aaron Davies. Editing and special effects were done by Merlin Cornish and the music was composed by Yuri Worontschak.

== Series synopsis ==
After thousands of years of wars, pollution, undrinkable water and silly cartoon shows, humans are forced to leave Earth and move everything and everyone to a new planet: New Earth. But not everything goes to plan when the Dogstar, a giant space ark containing all of the world's dogs, goes off course and becomes lost in space. On New Earth, the evil Bob Santino makes his fortune selling canine replacement units, Robogs, and plots to ensure the Dogstar is never found. But the Clark kids desperately miss their real dog, Hobart, and begin a quest through space to find the Dogstar - with Bob in hot pursuit.

== Series 1 (2006) ==
1. A Dog's Tale - 4 September 2006
2. Obedience School - 18 September 2006
3. Fetch - 11 September 2006
4. Pedigree - 25 September 2006
5. Dogfight - 2 October 2006
6. Dog Ears - 9 October 2006
7. Underdogs - 16 October 2006
8. Sit Drop Stay - 23 October 2006
9. The Beagle Has Landed - 30 October 2006
10. Sick as a Dog - 6 November 2006
11. Puppy Love - 13 November 2006
12. Running with the Pack - 20 November 2006
13. Paws - 27 November 2006
14. Dog Show - 16 April 2007
15. Old Dog New Tricks - 23 April 2007
16. Hounded - 30 April 2007
17. Dog Gone - 7 May 2007
18. Bad Dog - 14 May 2007
19. Dog Leg - 21 May 2007
20. Top Dog - 4 June 2007
21. Let Sleeping Dogs Lie - 11 June 2007
22. Off Lead Area - 18 June 2007
23. Dogged Determination - 25 June 2007
24. Man Bites Dog - 2 July 2007
25. Smart Dog - 9 July 2007
26. A Tail's End - 16 July 2007

== Series 2 (2011) ==
1. Public Enemy Number One
2. The Quick and the Dog
3. Fred Ward
4. Even Deeper Impact
5. Father's Day
6. Absent Friends
7. Robbie
8. The Big Bang
9. Little Boy Lost
10. Fatal Attraction
11. Robot Revolution
12. Twice the Excitement
13. Dogtopia
14. Game Time
15. Mensamania
16. Rockin' in the Flea World
17. The Greatest Superhero
18. It's the End of the World as We Know It
19. Robosauria
20. Secrets and More Secrets
21. Persuasion
22. The Good, the Bad and the Baba
23. Titanium Chef
24. Reach Out and Touch Somebody's Paw
25. The Greening of Gavin
26. Relative Dimensions in Space

== Christmas special (2016) ==
Media World Pictures produced a movie-length Christmas special called Dogstar – Christmas in Space for the Nine Network, which was released in Christmas 2016.

== Cast ==
The series featured the following voice artists:

- Brandon Burns as Glenn Bruce Clark
- Kate McLennan as Simone Clark
- Emma Leonard as Lincoln Clark
- Roslyn Oades as Gemma
- Beverley Dunn as Gran Clark
- Henry Maas as Bob Santino
- Marg Downey as Alice, Daina and Greta
- Matt Tilley as Eke
- Gary Files as Ramon Ridley
- Michael Veitch as Mark Clark
- Matthew King as Hank and Planet Man
- Simone Gescheit as Dino Sandino
- Shaun Micallef as Boombah and Narrator
- Abbie Holmes as Boombah Fenwick and various guest roles
- Marnie Reece-Wilmore
- Hamish Hughes – guest roles

== Awards ==
The series has garnered numerous awards:

=== 2009 awards ===
- Nominated for a Logie Award - Most outstanding Children's Program category

=== 2008 awards ===
- ASIAN TELEVISION AWARDS - Best Animation
- Australian Writers' Guild - Winner, John Hinde Award for Excellence in Science Fiction Writing at the AWGIE Awards
- WA SCREEN AWARDS, Australia - Outstanding Achievement for Animation Production
- THE HUGO TELEVISION AWARDS, Chicago International Film Festival - Certificate of Merit for Animated Series
- AFI, Australia - Nomination, Best Screenplay, Television
- AFI, Australia - Nomination, Best Guest/Supporting Actor, TV Drama
- ECOVISION FESTIVAL, Italy - Finalist
- ELECTRONIC AND ANIMATED ARTS ELAN AWARDS, Canada - Finalist, Best International Animated Production (Television Series)

=== 2007 awards ===
- Writers Guild of Australia - AWGIE Awards Finalist, Best Children's Television Script
- ENHANCE TV ATOM AWARDS, Australia - Finalist, Best Children's Television Series
- APOLLO AWARDS, Asia - Best Animated Opening Sequence
- INTERNATIONAL SHOWCASE, CARTOONS ON THE BAY, Italy, Official Selection

=== 2006 awards ===
- Writers Guild of Australia - Winner, AWGIE Award for Best Children's Television Script
- Australian Effects and Animation Festival - Finalist, Best Television Animation
