= Roslyn Oades =

Australian actor, puppeteer and theater maker

Roslyn Oades is an Australian actor, puppeteer and theatre maker.

Her acting work includes iconic Australian TV shows A Country Practice as a guest actor, and a two-year stint on Home and Away as Kylie Burton. Her character in Home and Away died from a drug overdose while in custody. She also played Remy in Toybox from 2010 to 2014.

Oades has been described as one of Australia's leading documentary theatremakers, noted particularly for her work pioneering headphone verbatim techniques where actors near simultaneously speak the recorded words of real people as they listen to them. Her work has been described as being like a documentary film-maker or investigative journalist, where she embedded herself in a community to develop source material for a work. The development of her headphone theatre techniques started from observing them as a drama exercise in a workshop run by director Mark Wing-Davey. She has recently departed from headphone verbatim work, moving towards works created through soundscapes, citing Janet Cardiff and George Bures Miller's work The Murder of Crows as formative influences.

Her audio-scripted performance work Hello, Goodbye & Happy Birthday received the Green Room Award for outstanding writing for the Australian Stage and in 2019 Oades received a special Green Room Award for Technical Achievement in theatre. Her work has also been nominated for Helpmann Awards, Sydney Theatre Awards and NSW Premier's Literary Award.

Three of her works have been published as a compilation titled Acts of Courage by Currency Press, including Stories of Love and Hate (made in response to Cronulla riots through interviews with 65 people over a two-year period) Fast Cars and Tractor Engines and I'm Your Man

== Filmography ==
=== Television ===
- A Country Practice as guest actor
- Home and Away (1998–2000) as Kylie Burton
- Tracey McBean (2002–06) as Voice
- Bambaloo (2003–07) as Gypsy (voice & puppeteer)
- Dogstar (2006–11) as Gemma (voice)
- Zigby (2009–13) as Voice
- Toybox (2010–14) as Remy (voice)
- Bananas in Pyjamas (2011–13) as Topsy the Kangaroo (voice)
- Kitty Is Not a Cat (2017–20) as Kitty (voice)
- Sea Princesses as Bia/Bea (voice)

=== Film ===
- Mary (1994) as Sister Paula

== Audio ==
- Hello, Goodbye & Happy Birthday

== Playwriting ==
- Acts of Courage by Currency Press (Stories of Love and Hate, Fast Cars and Tractor Engines and I'm Your Man)
