= Tracey McBean =

- Title card
- Genre: Adventure; Comedy; Science fiction
- Based on: Tracey McBean by Mary Small and Arthur Filloy
- Starring: Roslyn Oades; Anthony Hayes; Akmal Saleh; Daniel Wyllie; Tracy Mann; Stephen Shanahan; Lisa Bailey (series 1-2); Meaghan Davies (series 3)
- Narrated by: Roslyn Oades
- Composer: Nerida Tyson-Chew
- Countries of origin: Australia; China; Denmark (series 1)
- Original language: English
- No. of seasons: 3
- No. of episodes: 78

Production
- Executive producers: Noel Price; Claire Henderson; Jin Guo Ping; Tom Van Waveren (series 1)
- Producers: Noel Price; Charlotte Damgaard (series 1)
- Running time: 11 minutes
- Production companies: Southern Star; Shanghai Animation Studios; Egmont Imagination (series 1)

Original release
- Network: ABC-TV (ABC Kids)
- Release: 18 February 2002 – 29 March 2006

Tracey McBean is a three-series animation co-production between Southern Star, Shanghai Animation Studios and Egmont Imagination (series 1). The show was aired from 2002 until 2006 on the ABC-TV programming block ABC Kids.

== Premise ==
Tracey McBean is a nine-year-old girl who goes to school with her best friend Shamus. Together they use Tracey's inventions for all kinds of purposes, such as school competitions or simply for fun.

Tracey lives in a house and Shamus on the 15th floor of a tall apartment building. Shamus loves gardening organically and Tracey likes inventing devices and contraptions. Tracey uses a caravan in her backyard for inventing. The caravan, white with a horizontal thick red stripe, has an antenna, and a computer and many devices and parts within.

Tracey's younger sister, Megan, often annoys her to the extent that she will invent something to stop this annoyance. The antagonists are the McConnolly brothers, who go to Tracey's school. They often are rivals of McBean though lacking much intelligence and often are either culprits or annoy Tracey and Shamus is some manner.

Jim McConnolly is the leader, who is even powerful enough to use as a weapon or tool to add food or other items from fellow students. Jake McConnolly is the obese and usually dim-witted brother who sometimes displays an odd amount of intelligence, but only briefly for an amusing value. McBeans' arch-rival, with equal or lower intelligence, though less morals, is Laszlo, a boys-only science club member.

In most episodes, Tracey invents a device to help her or her friends and family in a situation with good intention but this leads to a minor disaster or failure and she must work out a solution. Although based on her abilities in science and her technical knowledge the show rarely features any scientific basis for her inventions and many take on a fantastic amount of power or extremely exaggerated function.

== Characters ==
=== Main ===
- Tracey McBean (voiced by Roslyn Oades): Preteen-aged redhead Tracey makes inventions for all kinds of purposes.
- Shamus Wong (voiced by Anthony Hayes): Tracey's best friend of Asian heritage.
- Jim and Jake McConnolly (voiced by Akmal Saleh and Daniel Wyllie respectively): The two brothers who bully Tracey.

=== Minor ===
- Megan McBean (voiced by Lisa Bailey; Series 1-2 and Meaghan Davies; Series 3): Tracey's younger sister.
- Mr. and Mrs. McBean (voiced by Stephen Shanahan and Eliza Logan respectively): Tracey's parents.
- Gordon McBean (voiced by Daniel Wyllie): Tracey’s multi-talented yet notoriously lazy brother. Known for his love of food, TV, video games, and creative, unusual sandwich combinations, he frequently relies on his title inventor sister to solve his problems—most notably, his chronic lateness for school.
- Laszlo (voiced by Akmal Saleh): Tracey's inventor rival.
- Morris and Sandy: Tracey's pets. Sandy is a black-and-white dog, whilst Morris is an copper tabby cat.
- Mrs. Carmody (voiced by Eliza Logan): Tracey's teacher.
- Mr Longbottom (voiced by Stephen Shanahan): The school principal.
- Shamus' family: He has three older brothers with a father and mother.
- Lee (voiced by Teo Gebert): The boy who is rejected as bad luck but Tracey tries to help him. He appears in "Bad Luck Lee".
- Lynda: The well-known sports player when Tracey tries to get her to join the pane. Lynda appears in some episodes.
- Jimmy McConnolly: Jim and Jack's cousin. She appears in "The McConnelly Cousin".
- Robot Tracey (voiced by Roslyn Oades): The robot was invented by herself.
- The Robot family: The robot family was invented by Tracey herself.
- Mr. Arther (voiced by Stephen Shanahan): Tracey's uncle and an inventor like her.
- Harvey: Shamus' friend.

== Episodes ==
=== Series 1 (2002) ===
1. "Stretching Machine"
2. "Family Power"
3. "Gordon the King"
4. "Lost Thing Finder"
5. "Mum's Birthday"
6. "Multiplication"
7. "Pocket Money"
8. "School Camp"
9. "Brain Machine"
10. "Local Weather"
11. "Stage Fright"
12. "Park Monster"
13. "Invisible Megan"
14. "The Great Race"
15. "Fancy Dress"
16. "Rainbow"
17. "Robo Tracey"
18. "Horsing Around"
19. "Zoom Boots"
20. "Bugs"
21. "Finding the Beat"
22. "Gordon's Bed"
23. "Gordon's Makeover"
24. "Ultimate Jungle Gym"
25. "Fallout"
26. "Freckle Frenzy"

=== Series 2 (2005) ===
1. "Sherlock Tracey"
2. "Bad Luck Lee"
3. "Bald Bob"
4. "Marble Mania"
5. "Election"
6. "Veggie That Cried Wolf"
7. "World Record"
8. "Gentleman Jim"
9. "Big Things"
10. "The McConnelly Cousin"
11. "13"
12. "Anti-Shamus"
13. "Teddies"
14. "Galaxy Blazers"
15. "Party On"
16. "Dirt Magnet"
17. "Time Skip"
18. "Lights, Camera, Action"
19. "Surfbuster"
20. "Zoo Story"
21. "Fairy Tales"
22. "Swap"
23. "A Trifling Master"
24. "On Ice"
25. "Go, Gordon, Go!"
26. "Lost Muse"

=== Series 3 (2006) ===
1. "Jim in Charge"
2. "Come Back Cat"
3. "Someone Else's Shoes"
4. "Overdue"
5. "Inner Beauty"
6. "Stuck on You"
7. "Jurassic Tracey"
8. "Away"
9. "Jim's Curse"
10. "Clowning Around"
11. "Big Nick"
12. "Socks"
13. "To the Top"
14. "Boss Tracey"
15. "Where the Tracey Blows"
16. "Rubbish"
17. "Wild Times"
18. "Remote Control"
19. "Quiz Show"
20. "Radio Jim"
21. "Happy-Sad Birthday"
22. "Mystery Girl"
23. "Of Lice and Tracey"
24. "Escape"
25. "Game On"
26. "Makeover"

== Broadcast ==
The series originally aired on the ABC-TV programming block ABC Kids in Australia. Internationally, the show also aired on Fox Kids and Pop in the United Kingdom and Discovery Kids in the United States.

== Awards ==
- 2002 Australian Writers' Guild Awgie Award, Children's Television category - winner.
- 2003 Silver Logie for Most Outstanding Children's Program - winner.
- 2005 Australian Writers' Guild Awgie Award - winner.
