= Pipsqueaks =

- Genre: pre-school puppet show
- Directed by: Ian Munro
- Starring: Emma De Vries; Adam Kronenberg; Dash Kruck; Anna Straker
- Theme music composer: Jay Collie
- Country of origin: Australia
- Original language: English
- No. of series: 2
- No. of episodes: 135

Production
- Running time: 30 minutes
- Production company: Beyond Screen Productions

Original release
- Network: 7TWO
- Release: 30 October 2013 – 22 April 2020

Pipsqueaks is an Australian pre-school puppet series airing on Seven's digital channel 7TWO. Directed by Ian Munro, it premiered on 30 October 2013.

== Cast ==
- Sassy - Emma De Vries
- Squidge - Adam Kronenberg
- Peppy - Dash Kruck
- Poppy - Anna Straker
