= List of Johnson and Friends episodes =

This is a list of episodes of the Australian children's television series Johnson and Friends.

== Series overview ==
Series	Episodes	Originally released	
Series	Episodes	First released	Last released
1	12	3 September 1990	18 September 1990
2	14	29 October 1991	15 November 1991
3	26	18 November 1994	23 December 1994
4	26	5 June 1997	10 July 1997

== Episodes ==
=== Series 1 (1990) ===
No. overall	No. in series	Title	Directed by	Original release date
1	1	"Beginnings"	Ian Munro	3 September 1990
One day Johnson decided to find a friend and so began the best times ever.
2	2	"Under the Bed"	Ian Munro	4 September 1990
The toys never knew what they might find - there was no better adventure than going under the bed.
3	3	"Best of Friends"	Ian Munro	5 September 1990
Johnson, Diesel, and McDuff were the best of friends - even though they did not always agree on what to do.
4	4	"The Thing Outside"	Ian Munro	6 September 1990
McDuff did a very brave thing and got a medal and Squeaky found a home.
5	5	"Helpless"	Ian Munro	7 September 1990
Diesel has an accident and is miserable - Diesel's friends help out.
6	6	"Moving House"	Ian Munro	10 September 1990
Squeaky did not want to move house - but when she did she was very pleased.
7	7	"Playing Games"	Ian Munro	11 September 1990
McDuff was no good at playing games. She was not good at anything - or so she thought!
8	8	"The Birthday Present"	Ian Munro	12 September 1990
Toys do not get presents so they all wanted Michael's Birthday present – desperately.
9	9	"Wind Chimes"	Ian Munro	13 September 1990
First a heatwave, then a storm. It is up to the toys to shut the window and avert a flood.
10	10	"Sharing"	Ian Munro	14 September 1990
All the toys wanted a ride on Michael's skateboard and no one wanted to share - that meant trouble.
11	11	"The Picnic"	Ian Munro	17 September 1990
Johnson organised a picnic by the window - what a brilliant idea and what a picnic.
12	12	"Cleaning Day"	Ian Munro	18 September 1990
On cleaning day Michael's parents emptied the waste paper basket into the rubbish bin. But where was McDuff?

=== Series 2 (1991) ===
No. overall	No. in series	Title	Directed by	Original release date
13	1	"Camping Trip"	Ian Munro	29 October 1991
Johnson and Friends go camping in the great outdoors indoors.
14	2	"Homeless"	Ian Munro	30 October 1991
Alfred was homeless and had nowhere to go – how could the toys keep him from being thrown away?
15	3	"Battle of the Bed"	Ian Munro	31 October 1991
On top of the bed Alfred lorded it over the whole room as the toys prepared their battle plans.
16	4	"Secrets"	Ian Munro	1 November 1991
McDuff had a secret and the toys were desperate to know what it was. Would she ever tell?
17	5	"Blast Off"	Ian Munro	4 November 1991
Michael had to go to hospital and Johnson wanted to go with him – but how?
18	6	"A Case of Trust"	Ian Munro	5 November 1991
McDuff had lost her medal, but nobody knows who had taken it. All the toys were under suspicion.
19	7	"The Concert"	Ian Munro	6 November 1991
There was a show under the bed. It started that night and all the toys had stagefright.
20	8	"Baby of the Family"	Ian Munro	7 November 1991
Squeaky was the strongest toy in the bedroom but a real baby – how could the toys keep her safe?
21	9	"Crying Wolf"	Ian Munro	8 November 1991
Diesel loved playing nasty tricks and the toys had to teach him a lesson he would never forget.
22	10	"The Big Freeze"	Ian Munro	11 November 1991
It was the coldest day in Michael's bedroom ever and the toys just had to get warm somehow.
23	11	"Being Good"	Ian Munro	12 November 1991
When Diesel tried to be good, the bedroom was in greater danger than usual.
24	12	"Birthday Party"	Ian Munro	13 November 1991
When the toys organised a surprise birthday party for Johnson, they forgot to tell him – disaster.
25	13	"Operation Squeaky"	Ian Munro	14 November 1991
Johnson and his friends wanted to fix Squeaky's circuits but they did not know how.
26	14	"Buried Treasure"	Ian Munro	15 November 1991
The toys sail the seven seas of Michael's bedroom in search of buried treasure.

=== Series 3 (1994) ===
No. overall	No. in series	Title	Directed by	Original release date
27	1	"Diesel Tries to Fly"	Ian Munro	18 November 1994
When McDuff sticks some wings on Diesel, the toy truck thinks he can fly and all the toys are in danger.
28	2	"Dinosaur Tracks"	Ian Munro	21 November 1994
Squeaky is good at guarding the bedroom, but what are these tracks? Has she let a dinosaur into their room?
29	3	"The Pink Thread"	Ian Munro	22 November 1994
The toys follow the pink thread and discover a real treasure at the end of it - JOHNSON. He's unravelling.
30	4	"Melissa's Dinosaur"	David Ogilvy	23 November 1994
Michael's older sister, Melissa, has a toy dinosaur, Victoria, who all the toys are very keen to meet.
31	5	"Diesel Who?"	Ian Munro	24 November 1994
After a nasty crash, Diesel loses his memory and the toys must find it fast before he leaves the bedroom forever.
32	6	"The Homecoming"	David Ogilvy	25 November 1994
After a visit to the shop with Michael, McDuff feels very superior. How can the toys get her back to her old self again?
33	7	"The Three Little Pigs"	David Ogilvy	28 November 1994
When the toys act out the story of the three little pigs for Squeaky, Alfred gets to play the wicked wolf.
34	8	"Disappearing Act"	Ian Munro	29 November 1994
Johnson has a brand new magic trick but it confuses the toys even more than usual.
35	9	"Growing Up"	David Ogilvy	30 November 1994
Squeaky finds a bird's egg on the window sill and decideds to hatch it all by herself.
36	10	"The Flood"	Ian Munro	1 December 1994
It has been raining for days and now the toys must save the bedroom from the threatening flood.
37	11	"The Toy Orchestra"	David Ogilvy	2 December 1994
When Diesel learns to play the drum, he drives the other toys crazy before he learns how to make music.
38	12	"The Money Box"	David Ogilvy	5 December 1994
When Michael loses the money he has saved for a Mother's Day present, the toys decide to help him out.
39	13	"The Television Set"	Ian Munro	6 December 1994
When a television set appears in the bedroom, the toys are hooked in seconds flat and lose all interest in anything else.
40	14	"The Toy Hospital"	David Ogilvy	7 December 1994
When McDuff gets broken and taken to the hospital, the toys wonder if she will ever come back.
41	15	"A Trip to the Moon"	Ian Munro	8 December 1994
The toys build a space ship for a trip to the moon and enjoy the best adventure they have ever had.
42	16	"The Loose Tooth"	Ian Munro	9 December 1994
Michael loses his tooth and the toys are worried he will be thrown away. They must replace the tooth before he awakes.
43	17	"The Fancy Dress"	David Ogilvy	12 December 1994
Alfred is having a fancy dress party but Johnson cannot find a thing to wear. He might miss out on the party.
44	18	"The Art Exhibition"	Ian Munro	13 December 1994
Johnson organises an art exhibition but Diesel does not know what to paint.
45	19	"Finders Keepers"	Ian Munro	14 December 1994
The toys love playing with cardboard boxes. This is the best box yet, but who is going to get it?
46	20	"Leaving Home"	David Ogilvy	15 December 1994
Michael stops playing with Diesel when he gets a pedal car, so Diesel decides to leave home.
47	21	"Sock Soup"	Ian Munro	16 December 1994
When Johnson organises a toy dinner party in the bedroom, the toys enjoy a social occasion they will never forget.
48	22	"The Train Conductor"	Ian Munro	19 December 1994
The toys proudly present Alfred with a real train set for his birthday but now he will not let them travel on it.
49	23	"The Fun Run"	David Ogilvy	20 December 1994
The toys organise a fun run around the bedroom but it is such a long course that everyone starts to cheat.
50	24	"The Crying Baby"	Ian Munro	21 December 1994
The toys are overjoyed to have a baby in the bedroom but how will they comfort it if it begins to cry?
51	25	"Bringing Up Baby"	David Ogilvy	22 December 1994
McDuff and Diesel have a baby of their own - Michael's toy hammer - but Johnson and Alfred don't want to be babysitters.
52	26	"Going Away"	David Ogilvy	23 December 1994
The toys have never been on holidays but now there's a chance - if only Michael will clean up his room.

=== Series 4 (1995–97) ===
All episodes were originally produced and aired for Fox and WQED Pittisburgh in United States, but it didn't air in Australia until 1997.

No. overall	No. in series	Title	Directed by	Original release date
53	1	"Left Behind"	Ian Munro	5 June 1997
The toys come back from holiday, but where is Johnson?
54	2	"All at Sea"	Ian Munro	6 June 1997
The toys have a pirate adventure and sail the seven seas in Michael's bedroom.
55	3	"The Big Surprise"	Ian Munro	9 June 1997
Squeaky is up to something and the toys try to find out what it is.
56	4	"Victoria Gets Swapped"	David Ogilvy	10 June 1997
Victoria is swapped by Michael's sister, and it is up to the toys to get her back.
57	5	"The Thinker"	David Ogilvy	11 June 1997
Johnson loves thinking but it sometimes gets him into trouble.
58	6	"Little Red Riding Hood"	Ian Munro	12 June 1997
The toys love stories and one day when they tell Squeaky all about Little Red Riding Hood, they act out all the parts.
59	7	"The Telephone Exchange"	Ian Munro	13 June 1997
McDuff is fascinated by the telephone out in the hallway, so she makes each toy their own phone.
60	8	"Putting Out the Rubbish"	David Ogilvy	16 June 1997
The bedroom is full of rubbish so the toys decide to tidy up.
61	9	"The Birthday Balloon"	Ian Munro	17 June 1997
Diesel and McDuff admire some balloons hanging on the bedroom door, they suggest to Johnson that he should move them into the sunlight, which he reluctantly agrees to do, but disaster strikes when Johnson begins to float away.
62	10	"Traffic Lights"	Ian Munro	18 June 1997
The toys keep crashing into each other so they decide to install some traffic lights.
63	11	"Clowning Around"	Ian Munro	19 June 1997
McDuff wants to be an acrobat but finds out she is a versatile and natural clown.
64	12	"The Hypnotist"	David Ogilvy	20 June 1997
Johnson experiments with magic tricks and tries to hypnotise McDuff.
65	13	"The Tin Star"	David Ogilvy	23 June 1997
The toys fight over Michael's newest possession - a sheriff's badge.
66	14	"Three Billy Goats Gruff"	David Ogilvy	24 June 1997
When Alfred and Diesel decide that everything depends on how big one is, Johnson suggests that being smart is better and the toys embark on a delicious retelling of Three Billy Goats Gruff.
67	15	"Shoelaces"	David Ogilvy	25 June 1997
Michael has brand new shoes but he refuses to wear them until he can tie his own shoe laces, so the toys set out to show him just how easily it can be done.
68	16	"Diesel's Taxi"	Ian Munro	26 June 1997
Diesel reaches a stage in his life where he wants a job, a steady income and a garage of his own and Johnson suggests that since he likes moving, he should move the toys and become their taxi driver.
69	17	"The Evening News"	Ian Munro	27 June 1997
McDuff loves watching the news on the TV set so Johnson makes a TV set with Diesel and Johnson acting out the parts.
70	18	"The Toy Bus"	Ian Munro	30 June 1997
Squeaky is going to the toy hospital with Michael, but she is nervous about riding on the bus. The toys devise a plan to show her that bus rides can be fun.
71	19	"Alfred and Alphonse"	Ian Munro	1 July 1997
Alfred and his friend Alphonse, from the hot water bottle factory, decide to form a rock band with the toys.
72	20	"The Ghost Train"	Ian Munro	2 July 1997
Victoria is very upset - Melissa has stopped taking her to the annual fair, so the toys have a fair of their very own in Michael's room.
73	21	"Chicken Pox"	Ian Munro	3 July 1997
When Michael is confined to bed with chicken pox, the toys turn the bedroom into a sick room.
74	22	"The Elf"	David Ogilvy	4 July 1997
Strange things are happening in Michael's bedroom, the toys believe a mysterious elf is to blame, but they soon find out that all is not what it seems.
75	23	"Superbot"	Ian Munro	7 July 1997
Squeaky is pretending to be a superhero and the toys are sick of it. They devise a plan which fails, upsetting Squeaky, but they soon find themselves in trouble. Will Superbot forgive them and save the day?
76	24	"The Christmas Tree"	Ian Munro	8 July 1997
McDuff is not satisfied with the toys' homemade Christmas tree, but she soon learns that sometimes it is best to make do with what you have got.
77	25	"Christmas Presents"	Ian Munro	9 July 1997
The toys give each other presents - it only results in disaster. Johnson decides to ask Santa for advice, but when he does not show up, Johnson is in a state of desperation. Little does he know that luck is on his side.
78	26	"Happy New Year"	David Ogilvy	10 July 1997
When Michael's family heads off to the New Year's Eve fireworks, Alfred hypothesises that time is controlled by the ticking of a clock, Johnson accidentally breaks Michael's alarm clock and the toys panic, until they hear a strange sound coming from the hallway.
