= Arrowhead (2015 film) =

- Directed by: Jesse O'Brien
- Written by: Jesse O'Brien
- Produced by: Christian D'Alessi; Jesse O'Brien; Ben Whimpey
- Starring: Dan Mor; Aleisha Rose; Mark Redpath; Christopher Kirby; Shaun Micallef
- Cinematography: Samuel Baulch
- Music by: Ryan Stevens
- Release dates: November 2015 (SciFi Film Festival); June 2016 (Australia)
- Running time: 99 minutes
- Country: Australia
- Language: English
- Budget: $180,000

Arrowhead (also released as Alien Arrival) is a 2015 Australian science fiction film directed by Jesse O'Brien. It stars Dan Mor as Kye Cortland, an escaped political prisoner who is recruited by a rebellion to rescue his father from a totalitarian government. During his mission, he crash lands on a desert moon, which he learns has strategic value to both sides of the conflict.

== Plot ==
While escaping a political prison on a mining colony, Kye Cortland is forced to amputate his foot to save himself and the other prisoners from being torn apart by the mining machinery. Cortland is recruited to join the rebellion against General Lang, who won a civil war against General Hatch. Hatch explains to Cortland that his father, an important figure to the rebellion, is scheduled to be executed in several months on the anniversary of Lang's victory. Hatch wants Cortland, an accomplished pilot, to hijack a scientific vessel, retrieve its data, and use it to help Hatch free Cortland's father. Cortland receives a cybernetic foot and agrees.

Onboard the Arrowhead, Cortland wakes from suspended animation early and hacks into the vessel's data banks. He is concerned when this appears to lower the ship's defenses, but Hatch remotely assures him that it will be temporary and perfectly safe. A dangerous EMI flare-up prevents Cortland from sending the data to Hatch and damages the ship, forcing it to eject all the escape pods. Cortland escapes in a shuttle, landing near the escape pods on a desert moon. The ship's AI, RE3F, warns him of a toxic atmosphere but refuses to give further data without a valid login.

Exploring, Cortland finds the body of Arrowhead's security chief, Norman Oleander, and an intact pod with biologist Tarren Hollis. Cortland brings Hollis back to the shuttle and, after reviving her, uses her biometric data to activate RE3F. Hollis surmises Cortland is working for Hatch, who she says has been engaging in terrorist attacks; Cortland dismisses her accusations as propaganda. Hollis, who recognises Cortland as a soldier who served with her father, offers him a fair trial if he accompanies her to a rendezvous point where survivors will be rescued. Cortland declines.

Cortland rejoins her when RE3F refuses to start the shuttle's engines with Hollis' login. On the way, a hostile insectoid creature attacks and apparently kills Cortland, causing Hollis to miss the rescue. A nearby obelisk resurrects Cortland, infecting him with a symbiote and healing all his wounds, including his foot. Hollis and Cortland drag Oleander's body to the same obelisk, resurrecting him and using his biometric data to unlock all of RE3F's functions. Hollis convinces Cortland not to leave Oleander behind. However, when Oleander revives, he begins ranting and turns hostile. After Oleander shoots Hollis, Cortland kills him and collapses from his own wounds.

When Cortland revives, RE3F tells him he was dead for thirty-four days. The symbiote has again revived him, but Hollis is gone, apparently dead. With RE3F's help, Cortland works to restore the shuttle's power and escape the moon in time to rescue his father. Cortland discovers his symbiote causes him to transform into the insectoid creature during periods of intense stress or pain. After suffering an uncontrolled transformation, Cortland misses the anniversary. Resigned, Cortland spends the next three years bonding with RE3F, learning to control his transformation, and surviving on the moon. During this period an insectoid is attacking Cortland's refuge and thanks to RE3F he finds out that the insectoid is based on Oleander’s cells. Cortland sets up a trap and manages to kill Oleander by killing himself. Cortland is revived once again.

RE3F cannot volunteer information and must be asked questions. After a chance comment, Cortland learns from RE3F that Hollis survived the fight and possibly escaped the moon. Cortland is frustrated RE3F unwillingly withheld the information but scavenges parts from the shuttle to upgrade RE3F, giving it a mobile frame. Cortland set up an expedition to find out information about Hollis destiny and while exploring a deep cave he finds the two original bodies of Oleander and himself merged to a sort of organism deeply embedded in the planet. Cortland finally kills Oleander and tries to kill himself but failing doing so in a self preservation effort. He then finds out that Hollis left the planet with another pod. Grateful, RE3F illegally grants Cortland access to confidential information, revealing that the moon is the subject of a relativistic time dilation experiment. Hatch and Lang want to use the planet offensively against each other's forces.

Hatch lands on the moon, explaining that 20 minutes have passed from his point of reference. He has captured Hollis and threatens to kill her unless Cortland hands over the scientific data. Realizing Hatch, who admits to mass murder in pursuit of his goal, never intended him to survive, Cortland refuses. Cortland wounds Hatch with a grenade initially embedded in his cybernetic foot, then kills him by transforming. Hollis talks him down and helps him transform back to a human. The two plan to leave the moon and not only free Cortland's father but everyone else, too.

== Cast ==
- Dan Mor as Kye Cortland
- Aleisha Rose as Tarren Hollis
- Mark Redpath as Tobias Hatch
- Christopher Kirby as Norman Oleander
- Shaun Micallef as Re3f - Computer voice

== Production ==
Arrowhead was based on a short film Melbourne filmmaker Jesse O'Brien shot in 2012. Using this short film, which cost $600, O'Brien started a crowdfunding campaign for a feature version. Although the campaign was unsuccessful, it led to industry attention; TV1 offered $140,000 in funding, and O'Brien received another $40,000 from a production company started by friends he met at film school. Foxtel subsequently discontinued TV1, but they reassured O'Brien they were still committed to funding the film. Shooting took place in Coober Pedy and Sunshine, Victoria, over 22 days. O'Brien said he spent almost the entire budget during production, leaving only $1000 for post-production.

== Release ==
Arrowhead premiered at the SciFi Film Festival Sydney in November 2015.

It was released in June 2016 in Australia and New Zealand by StudioCanal, through Universal Sony, and has also been released in Japan, Germany and the UK. Deals were announced for US and Canadian distribution in September 2016. It was released on Netflix on 23 September 2017.

== Awards ==
Jesse O'Brien won the 2015 John Hinde Award for Excellence in Science-Fiction Writing in the AWGIE Awards for Arrowhead.

== Reception ==
J. R. Southall of Starburst rated it 5/10 stars and wrote that the film, though entertaining, includes too many disparate themes.
