= Aleisha Rose =

Australian actress

- Born: Aleisha Rose Groth; 11 September 1988 (age 38); Brisbane
- Occupations: Dancer; actress
- Years active: 2007–present

Aleisha Rose Groth (born 11 September 1988) is an Australian actress. She gained recognition for her portrayal of Tina, the dancing doll, in the TV show Toybox. Additionally, she appeared in the 2015 Jesse O'Brien film, Arrowhead.

== Career ==
During her early years, Rose received training in ballet and musical theatre. She began her career at the Walt Disney Company as a dancer and later pursued acting. In 2011, she was accepted into the National Institution of Dramatic Art, an Australian acting school. She resides in Brisbane, Queensland.

== Filmography ==
Year	Title	Role	Notes	Ref.
2007	Kahuna	Co-Host D.G. Enterprises	Pilot	
2011	We are walking out	Dancer/Lead Actor	Film	
2011	Friend Request	Erika	Film	
2011	Little balloon	The Mum	Film	
2012	The Wolverine	Stand in 2012	Film	
2012	Lab Rats Challenge	Herself	TV series, presenter	
2013	Toybox	Tina the Doll	TV series, presenter	
2014	Arrowhead (also known as Alien Arrival)	Tarren Hollis	Film	
2016	New Politics	Zara Anders	Short film	
2017	"3 Old Guys (pilot)"	Ashley	Television series pilot	
2020	Stranded Pearl	Anita	Film	
2021	The Amazing Race Australia	Herself/Contestant	Season 5 contestant	

== Personal life ==
In 2019, Rose married Christopher Peever DiLoreto, whom she had met in high school before graduation in 2005.
