= Toybox (TV series) =

- Genre: Children's television
- Created by: Ian Munro; Ron Saunders
- Directed by: Ian Munro
- Starring: Brittany Byrnes (series 1–3); Aleisha Rose (series 4); Riley Nottingham; Leighton Young (series 1); Nick Skubji (series 2); Kyal Scott (series 3 & 4); Ranee Clayton; Roslyn Oades; Sean Masterson
- Opening theme: "Toybox"
- Ending theme: "Toybox" (instrumental)
- Country of origin: Australia
- Original language: English
- No. of series: 4
- No. of episodes: 290

Production
- Running time: 30 minutes
- Production company: Beyond Productions

Original release
- Network: Seven Network (2010–2012); 7TWO (2013–2014)
- Release: 14 October 2010 – 10 May 2014

Toybox is an Australian live action children's television series that first screened on the Seven Network on 14 October 2010, has since re-aired on 7TWO numerous times, and last aired re-runs in April 2020. The series was created by Beyond and produced and directed by Ian Munro, with 290 half-hour episodes for preschool children.

== Cast ==
- Brittany Byrnes as Tina the Dancing Doll (series 1–3 and Carols in the Domain)
- Aleisha Rose as Tina the Dancing Doll (series 4)
- Riley Nottingham as Tom the Cowboy Builder
- Leighton Young as Super Ned the Robot (series 1)
- Nick Skubij as Super Ned the Robot (series 2)
- Kyal Scott as Super Ned the Robot (series 3 and 4)
- Ranee Clayton as Patches the Rag Doll
- Roslyn Oades as Remy
- Sean Masterson as Ricky

== Series overview ==
Series	Episodes	Originally released	
Series	Episodes	First released	Last released
1	75	14 October 2010	26 January 2011
2	85	20 September 2011	17 January 2012
3	85	4 September 2012	31 December 2012
4	45	28 August 2013	10 May 2014

== Episodes ==
=== Series 1 (2010–2011) ===
No. overall	No. in season	Title	Original release date
1	1	"Super Ned Go Slow"	14 October 2010
2	2	"The Troupe"	15 October 2010
3	3	"Mystery Monster"	18 October 2010
4	4	"Upgrade or Outrage"	19 October 2010
5	5	"A Matter of Perspective"	20 October 2010
6	6	"Something Fishy"	21 October 2010
7	7	"Dragons Anymore"	22 October 2010
8	8	"Little Misunderstanding"	25 October 2010
9	9	"Mouse in the House"	26 October 2010
10	10	"Dr Cheer Up"	27 October 2010
11	11	"Ned to the Rescue"	28 October 2010
12	12	"The Leak"	29 October 2010
13	13	"The Thing-a-Me Ned"	1 November 2010
14	14	"Obstacle Course"	2 November 2010
15	15	"School for Pretend Superheroes"	3 November 2010
16	16	"What More Could a Doll Want"	4 November 2010
17	17	"Brothers and Sisters"	5 November 2010
18	18	"Dr Patches"	8 November 2010
19	19	"Helping Day"	9 November 2010
20	20	"What's in the Box?"	10 November 2010
21	21	"The Band"	11 November 2010
22	22	"Tina's New Zoo"	12 November 2010
23	23	"Hide and Seek"	15 November 2010
24	24	"Up in the Air"	16 November 2010
25	25	"Driving Miss Tina"	17 November 2010
26	26	"Search for a Lost Voice"	18 November 2010
27	27	"Can't Beat Em"	19 November 2010
28	28	"Quiet Achiever"	22 November 2010
29	29	"A Feathery Tale"	23 November 2010
30	30	"Sneezes Away"	24 November 2010
31	31	"Butterfly Magic"	25 November 2010
32	32	"Tom's Super Sale"	26 November 2010
33	33	"Dress Up Anyone?"	29 November 2010
34	34	"The Disappearing Box"	30 November 2010
35	35	"Trainer to the Toys"	1 December 2010
36	36	"Pirate Ned"	2 December 2010
37	37	"Battery Trouble"	3 December 2010
38	38	"Princess Tina"	6 December 2010
39	39	"Clean Up Day"	7 December 2010
40	40	"Tom's Treasure Hunt"	8 December 2010
41	41	"Party Mania"	9 December 2010
42	42	"Hiccups"	10 December 2010
43	43	"Magic in the Air"	13 December 2010
44	44	"Cat Nap"	14 December 2010
45	45	"Underwater World"	15 December 2010
46	46	"Stay-caution"	16 December 2010
47	47	"Dinophobia"	17 December 2010
48	48	"Crazy Cups"	20 December 2010
49	49	"Our Room Rules"	21 December 2010
50	50	"Magnetic Forces"	22 December 2010
51	51	"Weather"	23 December 2010
52	52	"All for One, One for All"	24 December 2010
53	53	"Ned's N"	27 December 2010
54	54	"Tina's Leaving"	28 December 2010
55	55	"Sleepy Tina"	29 December 2010
56	56	"The Great Divide"	30 December 2010
57	57	"Favourites"	31 December 2010
58	58	"Silly Sardines"	3 January 2011
59	59	"The Best Mess"	4 January 2011
60	60	"Our New Friend"	5 January 2011
61	61	"Animal Farm"	6 January 2011
62	62	"Ned Needs a Charge"	7 January 2011
63	63	"Paper Playmates"	10 January 2011
64	64	"Great Fixer-Upper-Er"	11 January 2011
65	65	"The Moody Blues"	12 January 2011
66	66	"Jobs"	13 January 2011
67	67	"A Dog's Life"	14 January 2011
68	68	"The Sound of Silence"	17 January 2011
69	69	"Playful Puppies"	18 January 2011
70	70	"Magic Mat"	19 January 2011
71	71	"Time for Trouble"	20 January 2011
72	72	"Fly Me to the Moon"	21 January 2011
73	73	"Aliens"	24 January 2011
74	74	"Flower Power"	25 January 2011
75	75	"Planet Give & Take"	26 January 2011

=== Series 2 (2011–2012) ===
No. overall	No. in season	Title	Original release date
1	1		
