= Fatty and George =

- Genre: Children's; Drama
- Created by: Ron Saunders; Eddie Moses
- Written by: John Honey; John Patterson; Louise Sanders
- Directed by: John Honey
- Theme music composer: Peter McKinley
- Country of origin: Australia
- Original language: English
- No. of seasons: 1
- No. of episodes: 10

Production
- Producer: John Honey
- Production locations: Hobart, Tasmania
- Cinematography: Gert Kirchner
- Running time: 25 minutes

Original release
- Network: ABC
- Release: 3 March – 5 May 1981

Fatty and George is an Australian children's sci-fi television series from 1981 produced by the Tasmanian Film Corporation for the Australian Broadcasting Corporation. The series consisted of 10 episodes of 25-minute duration.

The series follows the adventures of a brother and sister as they try to discover the whereabouts of their scientist father, whilst being pursued by an evil woman and her henchman.

== Synopsis ==
Fatty and his sister George are two ordinary kids whose scientist father is experimenting with time travel. One day things go very wrong and he becomes trapped in a limbo-like dimension. Worse still, the rod-like crystal at the heart of his experiment is sought after by the wealthy and evil Nancy, who ruthlessly pursues the siblings in order to possess it. The crystal has the power to freeze time around the bearer, thus the consequences of it falling into the wrong hands could be potentially devastating. With the help of their friend Izzy, aunty Kath and grandad Bert, Fatty and George search for a way to bring their father back, while trying to stay one step ahead of Nancy and her henchman Phil. Complicating matters further are the children's battles with a gang of BMX biker kids, Slasher, Jonsey and Maggot.

== Production and distribution ==
Fatty & George was produced in 1979 and 1980 by the Tasmanian Film Corporation, which had been created by the Tasmanian state government to generate film and television ventures within the state.

Filming took place at various Hobart locations, and on set at the Tasmanian Film Corporation's studios in Moonah.

Fatty & George was screened both nationally on the ABC in 1981, and internationally. Fatty and George was one of Tasmania's most successful exports.

It received several repeat screenings on the ABC in subsequent years. Their rights to screen the series have long since expired, and it is unlikely to see broadcast again.

In 2004 Screen Tasmania presented the first three episodes of Fatty and George in their "Tasmanian Travelling Picture Show".

== Home media ==
Each episode was digitally remastered by the Tasmanian Archive & Heritage Office (TAHO) and released on DVD.

The popular children's series was selected for release due to requests from the public who were wondering how they could get a copy" says Digital Services' Officer at TAHO Ron Moss, "There is even a Facebook site for Fatty & George, which doesn’t surprise me; everything old is in vogue again."

John Honey, the director, producer and co-writer of the original series is delighted at its new digital release, "its terrific" he says, "The number of people I speak to who remember Fatty & George is enormous".

== Cast ==
Character	Actor
Fatty	Scott Kinloch
George	Lisa Douglas
Izzy	Mathew Excell
Nancy	Pamela Archer
Phil	Barry Pierce
Maggot	Michael Aitken
Slasher	Michael Chapman
Jones	Shaun Cocker [Mark Kop – in the Pilot – which doubled featured with the kids movie 'Dot & the Kangaroo' around Australian cinemas]
Bert	Fred Frampton
Kath	Noreen Le Mottee

== Episode list ==
Episode #	Episode Title	Original Air Date
1	The Crystal	03.03.1981
2	Kidnapped	10.03.1981
3	The Hideout	17.03.1981
4	The Champion	24.03.1981
5	The Gravestone	31.03.1981
6	Stolen Property	07.04.1981
7	The Bomb	14.04.1981
8	Common Criminals	21.04.1981
9	Discovery	28.04.1981
10	The Destroyers	05.05.1981
