= Johnson and Friends =

Australian children's television program

- Created by: Ron Saunders; John Patterson; Ian Munro
- Directed by: Ian Munro; David Ogilvy
- Narrated by: Paul Bertram
- Composers: Chris Neal; Braedy Neal
- Country of origin: Australia
- Original language: English
- No. of series: 4
- No. of episodes: 78 (list of episodes)

Production
- Producers: Ron Saunders; Donna Mitroff; Jay Rayvid
- Editors: Robin Archer; Neil Thumpston; Frans Vandenburg
- Running time: 10 mins
- Production companies: Film Australia; Avalon Studios

Original release
- Network: ABC
- Release: 3 September 1990 – 10 July 1997

Johnson and Friends is an Australian children's television program that originally aired on ABC from 3 September 1990 to 10 July 1997. It was produced by Film Australia and was created by Ron Saunders, John Patterson and Ian Munro. In the UK, it was shown on TCC, CBBC, and then on UK Living's Tiny Living strand for under-fives. It was later aired in the United States with dubbed American voices as a part of The Fox Cubhouse, an educational children's anthology series on Fox Kids, between 1994 and early 1996. The series was last repeated on ABC1, with this run ending on 19 March 2002. The fourth series was produced in 1995 for Fox and was not aired in Australia until 1997.

== Plot ==
Johnson and his friends are toys that belong to a boy named Michael, unseen except for when he sleeps in his bed. They reside in his bedroom, but do not move or show any signs of life until he has left the room or has fallen asleep. Each episode involves a story about the toys and it will usually have an educational message to convey to the viewer. The series is aimed at children less than five years old, however the show appealed to a family audience and children under 8 years. It plays upon their fascination with the notion that toys come to life while they are gone. However, the stories often have a deeper message, and sometimes they are very poignant.

== Production ==
The series started out as an idea by Film Australia producer Ron Saunders, who stumbled upon footage of a puppetry troupe being edited for a documentary film in one of the edit suites, in the late 1980s. The puppetry troupe featured a large scale truck puppet which gave Ron the idea of a scaled up puppetry series in which toys come to life. Ron teamed up with director Ian Munro to bring this idea to life, and after cycling through many writers, they found John Patterson - who impressed them immediately with his trial script. John developed the characters and their personalities from the ground up. Dr. Stephen Juan served as the educational consultant for the series and was involved to the very end. The characters were designed by Caroline Jones and the set was drawn up and built by Robert Dein. The series was conceived under the name Puppets, and then later Toytime, among other names, before being changed to Johnson and Friends.

The first series of 12 episodes was shot at AFTRS' studio complex in Sydney in 1990. Film Australia's technique involved a large oversized bedroom set, and adult actors in full body puppet costumes. This effect fooled many international buyers and there are people today who still do not understand how this was done.

The ABC bought broadcasting rights later on that year and the series premiered worldwide on the ABC on 3 September 1990, to instant praise. The series garnered a video release and the ABC agreed to co-produce the second series of 14 episodes, which premiered in 1991. The second series was shot at ABC's now decommissioned Frenchs Forest studio complex. This also marked the beginning of many successful international sales including to the BBC in the United Kingdom, RTP in Portugal and Stöð 2 in Iceland, among many others.

A music album based on the Johnson and Friends characters was produced by series composer Chris Neal and his son, Braedy for Film Australia and ABC Music. These songs were later used in the TV series and "The Diesel Rap" became a popular children's hit, featuring on more than six ABC compilation releases. Series writer John Patterson wrote all lyrics on the album.

At this point, Ian Munro and John Patterson had begun work on Boffins, and there were no new episodes of Johnson and Friends produced until 1994, when Film Australia entered into an agreement with Fuji Eight Company Ltd. following the success of the program on Japanese television, to coproduce a third series of 26 episodes. Avalon Studios in New Zealand and the ABC also invested in this series. Avalon provided shooting facilities and this series was shot in New Zealand. Budding director David Ogilvy, who is now a successful drama producer and writer, was brought on to assist Ian Munro with the shoot, when he was required back in Australia.

Several stage shows based on Johnson and Friends began touring around Australia, utilising Chris Neal's songs, voiceovers of the cast and the real television costumes. The shows were written by John Patterson and directed by Ian Munro. These shows ran from 1994 until 1999, with Johnson himself making many appearances within standalone ABC for Kids variety shows. Both Munro and Patterson were involved with the Johnson skits featured in these stage productions.

In 1995, after a successful sale in 1994 to the Fox Children's Network (resulting in an American revoice of the series) - a fourth series was commissioned and was shot at Avalon again. This series was produced by Film Australia in association with WQED Pittsburgh and Fox Children's Network. Fox paid the full budget for this series and as such had a lot of creative control, though, they left John Patterson and Ian Munro to do their craft, and not much was changed from their original concepts. These episodes aired in the US from 1995 until 1996 and began airing in Australia on the ABC in 1997. It is not known if this series was shown elsewhere.

In the late 1990s, an animated pilot for a spin-off series was produced and directed by Ian Munro. It was to be entitled 'Diesel and Delilah'. A 2-minute animation was produced featuring Diesel and Michael's cat Delilah. Doug Scroope and Katrina Sedgwick provided the voices. Little is known about the production and nothing eventuated from it after the pilot was produced.

Despite plans for additional episodes and further Johnson productions, the series came to a halt due to complications with FOX. Though merchandising was still available, and the stage shows continued to run for many years after that. The show was rerun on the ABC until 2002.

== Characters ==
- Johnson: The leader of the toys. A furry pink stuffed elephant who loves reading and acts as a mentor to his friends. Johnson is the wisest and oldest of the group, despite a shortcoming of not being able to count past one, and a tendency towards impatience sometimes.
- McDuff: A blue and yellow concertina who loves having fun. Although she is a little silly, McDuff is a kind and loyal friend, especially towards the misunderstood Diesel.
- Diesel: A red toy truck with a yellow and black hat that spends most of his time going "bruuum, bruuum" around the floor. He speaks with a very pronounced Australian accent. Although he can be brusque in manner, he means well and is obviously fond of his friends.
- Alfred: A green hot water bottle (made to resemble a frog), which is technically not a toy. He is a real fusspot and lives in the dark, dank area of the bedroom that is under the bed. He is neurotic and anxious and complains constantly. His face wears an aggrieved expression, but he does actually supply a lot of the humour. He also owns an old "banana skin blanket" which he is very protective of. Although grumpy and sometimes selfish on the outside, Alfred is generally good-natured and helps Johnson out on his endeavours.
- Squeaky: A black and red broken robot. She guards the bedroom while Michael is asleep and loves singing to herself. She is childlike and believes that the vacuum cleaner is her mother.
- Victoria: A slow-moving orange and purple stuffed dinosaur that actually belongs to Michael's elder sister, Melissa; Victoria will often appear at the door of Michael's bedroom and acts as a motherly figure to the other toys.
- Alphonse: Alfred's long lost friend from the hot water bottle factory, he mentions that he and Alfred are both very musically talented and were once known as "The Hot Water Rockers".
- Albert: Another hot water bottle acquaintance of Alfred's, Albert is known for his temper.
- Alfred's Friends: Aside from Alphonse and Albert, Alfred is shown to have many hot water bottle friends, whom he has invited to the bedroom at least once.
- Michael: The boy who owns the toys, he is only seen while asleep, but is frequently mentioned throughout the series.
- Melissa: Michael's sister who is the owner of Victoria. She is never seen on screen, only mentioned.
- Michael's Mum and dad: Michael's parents are occasionally mentioned throughout the series, however, they never appear physically.
- Michael's Aunt and Uncle: Michael's Aunt and Uncle are mentioned very briefly in one of the episodes.
- The Baby: Michael's infant cousin made a non-physical appearance in one of the episodes.

== Cast ==
| Character | Costume actor | Voice actor | US Voice Actor | Japanese Voice Actor |
|---|---|---|---|---|
| Johnson | Garry Scale (Series 1); Arky Michael (Series 2); Jonathon Hendry (Series 3 and 4) | Garry Scale | Tony Marino | Jeff Manning |
| McDuff | Katrina Sedgwick (Series 1 and 2); Dra McKay (Series 3 and 4) | Katrina Sedgwick | Zoje Stage | Terry Osada |
| Diesel | Bruce Wedderburn (Series 1 and 2); Matthew Chamberlain (Series 3 and 4) | Doug Scroope | David Flick (Series 1, 2 and 3); Doug Scroope (Series 4 and revised cuts of Series 1, 2 and 3) | Kent Frick |
| Alfred | Peter Browne | Peter Browne | Peter Browne | Jeff Manning |
| Squeaky | Kristen Lyons (Series 1 and 2); Sarah Boddy (Series 3 and 4) | Emily Lumbers (Series 1); Kristen Lyons (Series 2); Sarah Boddy (Series 3 and 4); Angela Toohey (Singing voice) | Katie Watkins | Terry Osada |
| Victoria | Elisabeth Easther (Series 3); Leighton Young (Series 4) | Deborah Kennedy | Minette Seate | Terry Osada |

The program is narrated by Paul Bertram. The US dub is narrated by Amy Hartman. The Japanese dub is narrated by Bruce Brunger.

== Episodes ==
| Series | Episodes | Originally released | |
| Series | Episodes | First released | Last released |
|---|---|---|---|
| 1 | 12 | 3 September 1990 | 18 September 1990 |
| 2 | 14 | 29 October 1991 | 15 November 1991 |
| 3 | 26 | 18 November 1994 | 23 December 1994 |
| 4 | 26 | 5 June 1997 | 10 July 1997 |

== Home media ==
Johnson and Friends received four video releases through 1990 to 1991, comprising 24 episodes out of the first 26 made. ABC Video would rerelease the first 4 videos with redesigned video cover artwork to fit with their new line of Johnson videos. They would go on to release a total of 13 videos through 1994 to 2002. Reel Corporation's children's division, Reel Kids would only release the first 48 episodes of Johnson and Friends in 2005 and would continue to re-release these 48 episodes throughout various compilation DVDs.

=== VHS releases ===
| VHS title | Release date | Episodes |
|---|---|---|
| Volume 1 (FA 0021 2) | 1990 | Beginnings, Under the Bed, Best of Friends, The Thing Outside, Helpless, Moving House |
| Volume 2 (FA 0024 2) | 1991 | Playing Games, The Birthday Present, Wind Chimes, Sharing, The Picnic, Cleaning Day |
| Volume 3 (FA 0025 2) | 1991 | Birthday Party, Homeless, Battle of the Bed, A Case of Trust, Blast Off, The Concert |
| Volume 4 (FA 0026 2) | 1991 | Baby of the Family, The Big Freeze, Secrets, Operation Squeaky, Crying Wolf, Buried Treasure |
| Best of Friends (14680) | 21 November 1994 | Beginnings, Under the Bed, Best of Friends, The Thing Outside, Helpless, Moving House |
| The Birthday Present (14681) | 21 November 1994 | Playing Games, The Birthday Present, Wind Chimes, Sharing, The Picnic, Cleaning Day |
| The Concert (14682) | 21 November 1994 | Birthday Party, Homeless, Battle of the Bed, A Case of Trust, Blast Off, The Concert |
| Buried Treasure (14683) | 21 November 1994 | Baby of the Family, The Big Freeze, Secrets, Operation Squeaky, Crying Wolf, Buried Treasure |
| Dinosaur Tracks (14616) | 21 November 1994 | Diesel Tries to Fly, Dinosaur Tracks, The Pink Thread, Melissa's Dinosaur, Diesel Who, The Homecoming |
| The Toy Orchestra (14837) | 13 March 1995 | The Three Little Pigs, Disappearing Act, Growing Up, The Flood, The Toy Orchestra, The Money Box |
| Songs From the Toybox (14980) | 10 July 1995 | Toys, Toys, Wonderful Toys (song), How Does an Elephant Walk? (song), Camping Trip, Why Is Blue, Blue? (song), Making Music (song), Being Good, I Could Be Anything (song), I'm a Waterbottle (song), The Television Set, Alfred & McDuff Duet (song), I'm a Little Robot (song), The Toy Hospital, When Michael Sat On Me (song), Sleepy (song) |
| A Trip to the Moon (17439) | 11 March 1996 | A Trip to the Moon, The Loose Tooth, The Fancy Dress, The Art Exhibition, Finders Keepers, Leaving Home |
| The Big Surprise (100519) | 10 March 1997 | Left Behind, All at Sea, The Big Surprise, Victoria Gets Swapped, The Thinker, The Hypnotist |
| The Tin Star (101188) | 5 March 1998 | Little Red Riding Hood, The Telephone Exchange, Putting Out the Rubbish, Traffic Lights, Clowning Around, The Tin Star |
| Diesel's Taxi (101647) | 14 September 1998 | Diesel's Taxi, Three Billy Goats Gruff, Shoelaces, The Evening News, Alfred & Alphonse, Chicken Pox |
| The Christmas Tree (102780) | 13 November 2000 | The Christmas Tree, Christmas Presents, Happy New Year, The Birthday Balloon, The Toy Bus, The Ghost Train, Super Bot |
| Sock Soup (103430) | 4 February 2002 | Sock Soup, The Train Conductor, The Fun Run |

=== Album list ===
- An Afternoon with Johnson and Friends (1992)
- Making Music (1994)

Compilation releases · ABC For Kids - Favourites (100532) 10 March 1997 - The Birthday Balloon

Special Releases · ABC For Kids - Video Hits Volume 2 (12985) 21 September 1992 - The Diesel Rap

== American version ==
In 1992, Jay Rayvid and Donna Mitroff of WQED, Pittsburgh (the PBS affiliate known for producing Mister Rogers' Neighborhood) entered into an agreement with Film Australia to attempt to get the series onto television in the United States, specifically PBS. Unfortunately, they were not able to secure funding from PBS to produce a pilot due to the sheer traffic and amount of submissions, despite their interest. When 1994 came around, FOX began to show interest in Johnson and Friends. At this stage, 26 episodes of Johnson (the first two series) had been produced and the latter 26 episodes (series three) was in post-production - all 52 episodes were available to WQED for distribution. FOX Children's Network committed to Johnson and Friends and thus The Fox Cubhouse was created.

WQED and FOX teamed up and implemented Johnson and Friends as a segment in Tuesday and Thursday episodes of the 'Cubhouse'. In addition, The Fox Cubhouse itself was shot at WQED. However, the FOX network executives believed that the Australian accents in Johnson and Friends would confuse American viewers, so the series was dubbed over by local Pittsburgh actors.

It was decided that Peter Browne would be retained as Alfred's voice actor, but due to master recording issues, all of his dialogue had to be rerecorded. Several additional songs and music tracks were written by Chris Neal and his son Braedy, who had previously composed all of the music for the original version of Johnson and Friends, as FOX felt that some of the earlier episodes were "too quiet" and did not fit the atmosphere they wanted for the series. Instrumental versions of preexisting Johnson songs were also used. As the series was broadcast as a segment rather than a standalone program, the credits were featured at the end of the Cubhouse itself and each Johnson episode ended with the final chorus of "Toys, Toys, Wonderful Toys" from the Johnson album, re-recorded by the US cast. Minor cuts were also occasionally made along with adjustments to John Patterson's scripts, by WQED executive Casey Brown, to remove Australian terminology and slang. These changes are generally frowned upon by many of the original Johnson and Cubhouse crew, as well as people who grew up with the series.

The Fox Cubhouse became a short-lived success, and FOX commissioned an additional season of 26 episodes of Johnson and Friends for the Cubhouse's second season. Series director Ian Munro maintained a level of creative control over the American version of the program and was involved with voice direction for this run of episodes. These episodes were also shown in Australia, dubbed by the original voice cast and marketed as the fourth series of the program, two years after production, in 1997. David Flick, who had provided the American voice of Diesel was replaced by Doug Scroope, Diesel's original voice, and several episodes of the first season of Cubhouse were also revised with Doug Scroope as Diesel, this change was actually present in late reruns of the first season of Cubhouse. While previous Cubhouse episodes featured two episodes of Johnson, each, the second season was quite different, and one episode was sometimes replaced with an episode of Budgie the Little Helicopter or Magic Adventures of Mumfie, due to the fact that these programs also had a running time of ten minutes. Some episodes, however, still featured two Johnson episodes. Shortly after the broadcast of these episodes, The Fox Cubhouse was taken off the air, and the American localisation has not been seen since. It is believed that many of the master tapes of the US version were wiped, however, several master copies are known to exist.

The Fox Cubhouse was also shown in the US overseas territory Guam on KTGM.
