= Peter Browne (Australian actor) =

Australian actor

- Occupation: Actor

Peter Browne is an Australian actor. Featured roles he played include Alfred, a hot water bottle, in Johnson and Friends, Trevor "Sootie" Coledale in Police Rescue and Andrew Byrne in Custody. In 1984 he joined the cast for the second season of Australia You're Standing In It. and in 1991 featured in a special episode of Inspector Morse set in Australia.

Stage roles Brown featured in include the caberet Dingo Bros. Xmas Bash (Comedy Company 1984), and Footy Follies (Paddington RSL, 1991)
