= Beyond International =

Australian television and film production company

- Logo used since 2013
- Type: Private
- Traded as: ASX: BYI
- Industry: Television and film production and distribution
- Predecessors: Magna Vision/Pacific/Home Entertainment (1985–2011); TCB Media Rights (2017–2020)
- Founded: 1984; 42 years ago
- Founders: Carmel Travers; Iain Finlay; Chris Ardill-Guinness; Phil Gerlach; Mikael Borglund
- Headquarters: Artarmon, New South Wales, Australia
- Key people: Mikael Borglund (CEO and MD)
- Owner: Mikael Borglund
- Parent: Fremantle (2008–2022); Banijay (2022–2024); BYI Holdings Pty Limited (2024–present)
- Divisions: Beyond Action; Beyond Entertainment; Beyond Media Rights; Beyond Productions; Beyond TNC; Beyond West; Beyond Distribution
- Website: beyond.com.au

Beyond International Limited, branded Beyond is an international television and film production company with operations in Australia and the United States. It is split into Beyond Productions, Beyond Distribution, Beyond Entertainment, and Beyond Action.

The company was formed in 1984 to produce the science and technology magazine program Beyond 2000, a commercial reworking of the program Towards 2000 which aired on the Australian public broadcaster ABC. Beyond 2000 was later rebooted in 2005 as Beyond Tomorrow. It was owned by Fremantle from 2008 to 2022, when it was acquired by Banijay. Since 2024, BYI Holdings Pty Limited have owned the company. Notable programming produced and/or distributed by Beyond include MythBusters, Deadly Women, Beat Bugs, and Highway Thru Hell. More recent productions include the feature documentaries The Angels: Kickin' Down the Door (2022), and Live It Up: The Mental As Anything Story (2026), each focusing on an iconic Australian rock band.

== History ==
The company was founded in 1984 by producers Carmel Travers, Iain Finlay and Chris Ardill-Guinness, as well as consultant Phil Gerlach and accountant Mikael Borglund, briefly titled CIC Productions, initially with the intention of making only one program, Beyond 2000 after which the company took its name. The company took responsibility for distributing the series, finding success in selling the program overseas, including to Discovery Channel in America and an American adaptation for Fox.

Early programs produced by Beyond include Just For the Record and Jack Thompson Down Under for Network 10 and Chances for the Nine Network. Beyond's relationship with Discovery Channel saw the company commissioned to produce a number of the channel's early programs, including a nine-season run of Invention and eventually the company's most successful program MythBusters.

In October 2001, Beyond Intetnational had partnered with New Zealand entertainment & production company South Pacific Pictures to form a new joint-venture distribution subsidiary entitled Beyond New Zealand, that would serve as Beyond International's new production division and the first independent distribution company based in New Zealand and would be based in Auckland & would provide a gateway to the international television marketplace for New Zealand producers, with South Pacific Pictures' founder & MD John Barnett serving as manager of the new joint-venture production unit.

In 2009, Beyond acquired distribution company Magna Pacific from receivership.

In 2013, Beyond formed a joint venture with Seven West Media called 7Beyond to produce programs in North America. 7Beyond shows include My Lottery Dream Home and My Kitchen Rules. In July 2020, Beyond International purchased Seven West Media's shareholding.

In 2020, Beyond acquired TCB Media Rights from receivership, following the collapse of Kew Media Group, valuing TCB at around $2.5 million. TCB Media Rights invests and distributes factual series including Abandoned Engineering and Extreme Ice Machines.

In October 2022, it was announced that Banijay would acquire Beyond. The acquisition was completed on 30 December 2022, and Beyond was delisted from the Australian Securities Exchange on 3 January 2023. At the end of February 2023, most of the company's employees at the company's distribution and sales arm (Beyond Rights) were let go. Beyond Rights was eventually folded into Banijay's own distribution and sales arm, Banijay Rights. The former company's site was moved to the latter company on 24 August 2023.

On 11 January 2024, it was announced that Mikael Borglund had purchased back Beyond Productions from both companies, including all content produced by them under Banijay ownership. Banijay retained all of Beyond's pre-2022 back catalog, and secured a five-year first-look distribution deal for all new Beyond productions.

=== Ownership ===
The company was listed on the ASX from 1987 until 2023. In 2008, FremantleMedia purchased just under 20% of shares in the company, making it the largest shareholder.

== Description and people ==
As of June 2026, Beyond operates in Australia and the United States. It is split into Beyond Productions, Beyond Entertainment, and Beyond Action. Mikael Borglund is managing director.

Beyond Action specialises in the production and distribution of programming relating to sport and other entertainment.

Beyond Entertainment produces scripted drama as well as unscripted documentaries and children's content. The unscripted section focuses on producing documentaries about Australian subjects that is aimed at an international audience. Paul Clarke is executive producer, while Martin Fabinyi is head of feature films and documentaries at the company. Recent productions include The Angels: Kickin' Down the Door, about Australian rock band The Angels, and Live It Up: The Mental As Anything Story (2026), about the band Mental As Anything.
