= Film Australia =

Former film company owned by the Australian Government

- Type: Government-owned
- Industry: Film
- Founded: 1945
- Defunct: 2008
- Headquarters: Australia

Film Australia was a company established by the Government of Australia to produce films about Australia in 1973. Its predecessors were the Cinema & Photographic Branch (1913–38), the Australian National Film Board (1939–1955, under different departments), and the Commonwealth Film Unit (1956–72). Film Australia became Film Australia Limited in 1988 and was consolidated into Screen Australia in 2008.

Administration of the Film Australia Collection was transferred from Screen Australia to the National Film & Sound Archive of Australia on 1 July 2011.

The mission of the organisation changed through its earlier incarnations, but from 1973 its aim was to create an audio-visual record of Australian culture, through the commissioning, distribution and management of programs that deal with matters of national interest or illustrate and interpret aspects of Australian life.

== History ==
In 1913, the Cinema & Photographic Branch (also known as the Cinema Branch) was created in Melbourne under cameraman Bert Ive, after he had been appointed government photographer and cinematographer. The Branch was administered by a number of Commonwealth government departments during its existence, changing the focus of the photographs and films, including the promotion of Australian merchandise, tourism, and immigration. When it came under the Commonwealth Immigration Office in 1921, the Cinema Branch was expanded, and by the end of the Silent era (1927 onwards), it was making a film a week. Lyn Maplestone, production manager from 1926, directed many of the films made by the Branch in the 1930s.

The Cinema & Photographic Branch wound up in 1938, Ive died on 25 July 1939, and Australia was at war with Germany two months later. The Cinema Branch moved into the new Department of Information (DOI), becoming the Australian National Film Board (also referred to as the Film Division, created in order oversee coordination of government and commercial filmmaking, and to engage film production in the war effort and based in Sydney). From 1950, the division came under the Australian News and Information Bureau, until 1955, and from 1956 until 1972 it was the Commonwealth Film Unit.

By the late 1940s, all film production took place in Sydney, and the Melbourne branch closed in 1954, after continuing to process some non-theatrical film until this time.

Stanley Hawes was the Producer-in-Chief from 1946 to 1969.

Between 1964 and 1966, the Commonwealth Film Unit produced a series of short promotional films titled Life in Australia. The series was commissioned by the Australian Department of Immigration and were intended for overseas audiences, especially in Europe, to promote migration to Australia during the final years of the White Australia policy.

In June 1973, the unit was superseded by Film Australia, which became Film Australia Limited in 1988.

The operations of Film Finance Corporation Australia, Australian Film Commission, and Film Australia were merged as Screen Australia in July 2008.

Administration of the Film Australia Collection was transferred from Screen Australia to the National Film and Sound Archive (NFSA) on 1 July 2011, and the Film Australia Library became the Film Australia Collection.

The Australian Children's Television Foundation became distributors for Film Australia's children's catalogue, with the exception of Boffins, maintained by the NFSA.

== Films ==
Between 1964 and 1966, the Commonwealth Film Unit produced a series of short promotional films titled "Life in Australia", commissioned by the Australian Department of Immigration for overseas distribution. The twelve films focused on Sydney, Melbourne, Brisbane, Adelaide, Perth, Hobart, Geelong, Launceston, Cairns, Mount Gambier, Wagga Wagga and Geraldton, and were designed to attract migrants, particularly from Britain, by presenting employment opportunities and an image of a modern, prosperous society. Each film followed a similar format, highlighting industry, education, housing, healthcare, sport and cultural life. The series has since been described by the National Film and Sound Archive as reflecting an "idyllic vision of the 1960s".

Following the transfer of administration of the Film Australia Collection to the NFSA in 2011, the NFSA undertook restoration of the "Life in Australia" migration film series in 4K resolution. The restored films were published online between 2019 and 2025. The NFSA has described the series as an important historical "time capsule", reflecting the government film making style of the 1950s and 1960s and the migration policies of the era.

In 1967, Film Australia (then the Commonwealth Film Unit) produced a movie titled One Man's Road which prominently featured Aboriginal Australian activist Clive Andrew Williams, in which he shared many stories about his life. Upon the film's release, Williams was dismayed to discover that the Australian Department of Territories had been using the movie as propaganda to promote the cultural assimilation of Aboriginal people, something which Williams opposed.

In 1973, Film Australia gained its first female producer, Suzanne Baker, who in 1977 became the first Australian woman to win an Academy Award, for Best Animated Short Film, for Leisure, animated by Bruce Petty.

Some of Michael Thornhill's first films were short documentaries made for the Commonwealth Film Unit, including The Esperance story (1968) and Cheryl and Kevin (1974). One of Film Australia's most successful films is A Steam Train Passes. It has won many awards and is generally regarded as Australia's finest railway film.

Film Australia also created one of Australia's most successful children's television programs, Johnson and Friends, which ran for four series. The program sold to over 50 territories and ran from 1990 until 1995. This venture also lead to the creation of further children's programs, including The Girl from Tomorrow / Tomorrow's End, Boffins, Escape from Jupiter / Return to Jupiter and Spellbinder / Land of the Dragon Lord.

== Operations ==
Before becoming Screen Australia, Film Australia was one of the nation's leading producers of television documentaries and educational programs. Film Australia produced programs under the National Interest Program: a contract with the Australian Government to devise, produce, distribute and market productions that deal with matters of national interest or illustrate and interpret aspects of Australian life. Additional funding for a ten-part series on Australian history was provided by the Government from 2005.

Film Australia was the executive producer of these productions, drawing the creative and technical talent needed to produce them from Australia's independent documentary production industry. The company also provided support to the Australian documentary sector through a range of services and facilities, under its Community Service Obligations.

The Film Australia Library manages over 5000 titles and 150,000 photographs, reflecting a century of Australia's history. This unique archive of footage and stills is made available to the production industry. Film Australia Digital Learning creates projects targeted to the developing market for educational resources, primarily for delivery online. It draws largely on the materials in Film Australia's Library, and creates opportunities for documentary filmmakers and multimedia producers in education and new media production.

Film Australia Distribution markets both National Interest Program productions and independently produced documentaries to Australian and international broadcasters, and to libraries, schools, universities and community groups.

Film Australia Studios in Sydney is a purpose-built film and television production facility and provides screening venues, a sound stage, sound post-production facilities, a film laboratory, production offices, editing and transfer suites. These are used by many Film Australia and low-budget independent film and television productions, and by long-term tenants who operate production facilities and service companies.
