= Weapons of Choice =

2004 alternative history novel by John Birmingham

- First edition
- Author: John Birmingham
- Cover artist: Bob Warner
- Language: English
- Series: Axis of Time
- Genre: Alternate history
- Publisher: Del Rey Books
- Publication date: June 2004
- Publication place: Australia
- Media type: Print (Paperback)
- Pages: 544
- ISBN: 0-7329-1199-0
- OCLC: 62539678
- Followed by: Designated Targets

Weapons of Choice is a science fiction novel by Australian author John Birmingham, the first in his Axis of Time alternative history trilogy.

A television adaptation was announced in 2021.

== Plot ==
In 2021 off East Timor, a US-led multinational task force commanded by Admiral Phillip Kolhammer prepares to liberate the Indonesian islands from an Islamic government calling itself the Caliphate, which is slaughtering the Chinese nationals living there. In the book's backstory, the Chinese government was planning to send a task force but was warned by the US government not to do so. The flagship of the task force is the aircraft carrier USS Hillary Clinton, named after "the most uncompromising wartime president in the history of the United States". The task force is made up mainly of US and British units alongside French, Australian, Japanese, and Free Indonesians, along with a few other units like Spetsnaz from Russia and Kommando Spezialkräfte from Germany. Alongside the navy task force is JRV Nagoya, a scientific ship that is experimenting with wormholes; the navy ship protecting it is ordered to join the task force. A new ship from the Royal New Zealand Navy is sent as escort, but prior to its arrival, Nagoya's project director, Manning Pope, decides to make a trial run. The task force is constantly watched by a Caliphate spy on the mainland.

In late May - early June 1942, Rear Admiral Raymond A. Spruance and Lt. Commander Daniel Black are on the bridge of USS Enterprise, on their way to face the Japanese sent to invade Midway. A growing commotion outside the bridge prompts them to investigate, only to find a large group of what are, to them, unknown and strangely designed ships. They spot a ship with the Japanese ensign and assume it is the Japanese fleet sent against Midway and they order their own ships to open fire. The multinational task force Combat Intelligence, referred to as CI, takes defensive action; the 21st-century fleet nearly wipes out the US fleet, including USS Hornet and USS Yorktown. During the battle, Kolhammer and the rest of the multinational task force commanders learn that not all ships of the task force came through and those that did, did not all end up in the same place.

The light aircraft carrier Ryūjō encounters the Free Indonesian ship KRI Sutanto and boards it. The Indonesian crew are taken captive, but the Japanese learn that the Americans already broke their codes prior to Midway and upon learning the navy's history after their defeat, prompting Yamamoto to withdraw back home.

Surviving leaders aboard both 1940s American and 21st-century multinational ships manage to stop the battle after the presence of U.S. Navy ships among both fleets is recognized, and an uneasy truce is called as the two groups withdraw to Pearl Harbor. However, murders, rapes, and riots happen as the 21st-century people try to mix with the locals, with the racial segregation laws and pervasive racism of the 1940s United States being a major point of contention. Kolhammer is flown to California to meet President Franklin D. Roosevelt and Albert Einstein. As time goes by with no sight of JRV Nagoya, more and more 21st-century personnel start to realize they are stuck in 1942.

Captain Karen Halabi and HMS Trident, a Trident-class trimaran stealth destroyer, are ordered back to the Home Island for evaluation and possible transfer of Trident. However, prior the ship's and her departure, they take part in a prisoner of war rescue in Singapore and Luzon. The rescue is carried out by both 21st-century and 1942 personnel, but the munitions stores of the 21st-century forces are steadily being depleted without any upcoming prospect of replenishment.

Through the Japanese, Hitler learns about the results of the invasion of the Soviet Union and sends Ribbentrop to negotiate peace with the Soviet Union.

== Historical characters featured ==
=== Allies ===
==== British Commonwealth ====
- Winston Churchill: British Prime Minister
- John Curtin Australian Prime Minister
- Sir Dudley Pound RN Admiral of the Fleet
- Sir Leslie Murray RN Rear Admiral

==== U.S. ====
- Franklin D. Roosevelt U.S. President
- Raymond Spruance USN Rear Admiral
- Chester Nimitz USN Admiral
- William Halsey USN Admiral
- Ernest King USN Admiral
- Douglas MacArthur U.S. Army General
- George Marshall U.S. Army General
- Dwight D. Eisenhower U.S. General Staff Brigadier

=== Axis ===
==== Germany ====
- Adolf Hitler Nazi Germany Führer and Reichskanzler
- Heinrich Himmler Reichsführer
- Joseph Goebbels Reichsminister
- Joachim von Ribbentrop Foreign Minister
- Hermann Hoth Oberführer
- Otto Skorzeny Standartenführer
- Erich Raeder Gross Admiral
- Karl Dönitz Admiral
- Otto Ciliax Vice Admiral

==== Japan ====
- Isoroku Yamamoto IJN Admiral, Commander in Chief Combined Fleet
- Boshirō Hosogaya IJN Vice Admiral, Commander Northern Area Force
- Kakuji Kakuta IJN Rear Admiral, Commander Second Carrier Striking Force
- Tadeo Kato IJN Captain Ryūjō
- Hiroshi Ōshima IJA General, Japanese ambassador to Germany

== Ships of the MNF ==
This list reflects the knowledge of the MNF as of the end of Weapons of Choice. A number of ships of the MNF did not go through the Transition with the rest of the fleet; as of the end of the book, it is unclear which of these ships remained in the 21st century, which were destroyed by the Transition or immediately after, and which fell into enemy hands. More information about the fate of the missing ships is revealed in the sequel, Designated Targets.

- USS Hillary Clinton—George Bush–class supercarrier
- USS Kandahar—Baghdad-class littoral assault ship
- USS Leyte Gulf—Nemesis-class stealth cruiser (Overlapped USS Astoria. Stripped for equipment and destroyed.)
- USS Amanda L. Garrett—Cobb-class air warfare destroyer [James H. Cobb] (missing after Transition; lost in waters off Antarctica)
- USS Providence—Harpers Ferry–class amphibious landing dockship
- USS Kennebunkport—LPD-12-class landing assault ship
- USS Denver—Nuclear-powered attack submarine (with nuclear weaponry on board, missing after Transition)
- USS Chicago—Nuclear powered attack submarine (with nuclear weaponry on board, missing after Transition)
- HMS Trident—Trident-class stealth destroyer (trimaran)
- HMS Vanguard—Trident-class stealth destroyer (missing after Transition)
- HMS Fearless—Aden-class helicopter assault ship (destroyed in Transition)
- HMAS Havoc—Woomera-class attack submarine (erroneously called Savage class in certain editions' dramatis personae, non-nuclear)
- HMAS Moreton Bay—Jervis Bay–class troop-carrying catamaran
- HMAS Ipswich—Newcastle-class light littoral assault ship
- JDS Siranui—Modified Nemesis-class stealth cruiser
- KRI Nuku—Parchim-class corvette (arrived on island in New Guinea, stripped by Japanese)
- KRI Sutanto—Parchim-class corvette (recovered by Japanese; destroyed by Allied forces)
- Dessaix—French Sartre-class stealth destroyer (missing after Transition)

(For the 1942 ships, see Midway order of battle.)

== Fictionalisations of real people ==
- Harry Turtledove, an alternative history author, appears as "Commander Turtletaub", an aide to FDR. Turtledove has on occasion used the pseudonym 'H. N. Turteltaub'. References to Turtledove's Worldwar series also appear.
- S. M. Stirling and Eric Flint, also alternative history authors, were tuckerized as Secret Service agents.
- "Lieutenant Matt Reilly"—Australian thriller writer. Meteorology Officer, USS Leyte Gulf. Redshirted.
- Garth Nix, Dale Brown, Tom Clancy and Stephen Euin Cobb—thriller writers appearing as counterboarding specialists aboard USS Leyte Gulf.
- "Captain Harry Windsor"—an SAS officer sometimes referred to as "Prince Harry". Prince Harry of the United Kingdom, grandson of Queen Elizabeth II, and currently (as of September 2022) fifth in line for the British throne.
- The novel features the U.S.S. Hillary Clinton, named after "the most uncompromising wartime president in the history of the United States".

== See also ==
- The Final Countdown
- Zipang (anime), Zipang (manga)
