= Drew Jarvis =

Australian children's television presenter

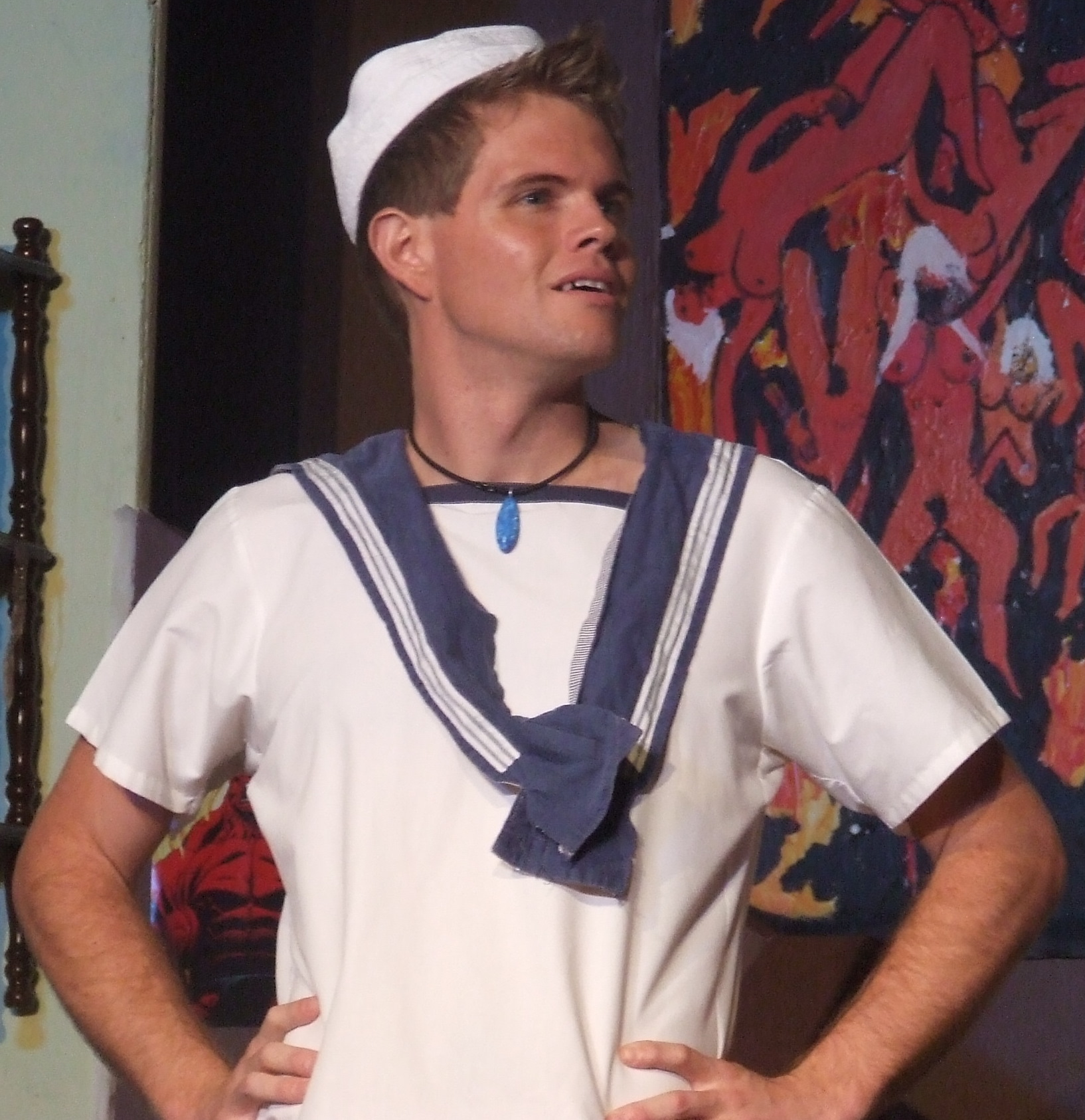
- Drew Jarvis in Brisbane Arts Theatre's production of The Tasmanian Babes Fiasco, April 2010
- Born: 1984 (age 41–42); Rockhampton, Queensland, Australia
- Occupations: Actor, television presenter
- Years active: 2006–present
- Spouse: Lucy Flook

Drew Jarvis is an Australian children's television presenter who has appeared on television programmes The Shak and Lab Rats Challenge. He married Lucy Flook in 2009.

== Biography ==
Jarvis grew up in Rockhampton, Queensland and was interested in film technology and the entertainment industry. When Jarvis was in year 7, he and his friends recorded their own shows on cassette tapes and then give them to classmates. A year later he transferred to Glenmore State High School and started studying film and television also making short films in his spare time. In the 1990s Jarvis moved to the Gold Coast where he attended Griffith University where he studied for a Bachelor of Arts degree. After graduating he performed in many shows at the Gold Coast Arts Centre’s Comedy Clubhouse while also working as a street performer in Warner Bros. Movie World as characters such as The Penguin, Dr. Evil and Willy Wonka. In 2006 he received his first major hosting role as Curio for the Channel 9 children's show The Shak. He then went on to be in many other television programs such as Lab Rats Challenge, Hole In The Wall and Pyramid.

In 2014, Jarvis joined Network Ten's children's department as the producer of Toasted TV and in 2015 he joined as series producer of the twenty-third series of Totally Wild. In June 2018 he was appointed as the executive producer of children's television on the network.

== Acting career ==
Year	Title	Type	Role
2006–2009	The Shak	TV series	Curio
2007	The Return	Play	Trev
2007	Fittys Rage	Short Film	Unknown
2008	Sleeper	Short Film	Baker
2008	Lab Rats Challenge	TV series	Co-host
2008	Scorched	TV movie	Ewen Trembly
2008	Hole in the Wall (Australian game show)	TV	Contestant
2008	Rock Eisteddfod Challenge	TV	Co-host
2009	Pyramid (Australian children's TV series)	TV	Celebrity Contestant (6)
2009	The End Of Cinema	Film	Jesse Plimton; Hadley Jones
2009	Rock Eisteddfod Challenge	TV	Host
2009	IMAGINARY ordinary	Short Film	Elliot Appleby
2009	Bomber's Unconscionable Contract	Short Film	Adult Bomber
2009	HAZE	Short Film	Unknown
2009–2010	The Shak at Home	TV series	Aunt Beatrice
2010	The Intrepid Voyage Of Steamship Daedalus	Short Film	Isaac Malice
2010	The Shak at Home	TV series	Karl Stimpson
2010	The Tasmanian Babes Fiasco	Play	Phil/Graeme

== Awards ==
Year	Award	Result	Event	For Role In
2007	Best Male Lead	Nominated	Queensland New Filmmakers Awards	Imaginary Ordinary
2007	Best Male Lead	Nominated	48 Hour Film Festival	Imaginary Ordinary
