= Final Impact =

2007 novel by John Birmingham

- First edition
- Author: John Birmingham
- Language: English
- Series: Axis of Time
- Genre: Alternate history, Science fiction
- Publisher: Macmillan
- Publication date: August 2007
- Publication place: Australia
- Media type: Print (Paperback)
- Pages: 368
- ISBN: 0-345-45716-1
- OCLC: 68192608
- Preceded by: Designated Targets

Final Impact is a science fiction novel by Australian writer John Birmingham, the last volume of his alternate history Axis of Time trilogy.

== Plot summary ==
Picking up two years onwards from the end of Designated Targets, Final Impact is the last novel in the Axis of Time trilogy. The supercarrier Hillary Clinton has been refurbished with more conventional steam catapults which replaced her less reliable fuel air explosive catapults. Her carrier air group is replenished with A-4 Skyhawk jet-powered attack aircraft, many of which are flown by 'temps, contemporary pilots. Admiral Kolhammer returns to sea at the head of a new Task Force with the Clinton at its core after two years of administering the Special Administrative Zone-California. Many characters have died in the intervening time period, from FBI Director J. Edgar Hoover, by his own hand to Commander Dan Black, one of the main characters of the story who asks for a return to combat and dies during the re-takeover of Hawaii, when his plane crashed during take-off from Muroc Airfield, California.

D-Day is launched on 3 May 1944, a month earlier than in the original timeline. The Allies invade the Pas-de-Calais instead of Normandy, relying on a dis-information campaign to obtain surprise. They are able to gain a foothold and slowly push back the Nazi forces. On 27 May the Allies gain a major victory by wiping out several German divisions with massed air strikes. On 1 June the USSR rejoins the Allied side and declares war against the Axis: They launch a huge attack against Germany and advance on a broad front. The Soviets have used the intervening two years to build up their armed forces, and construct fleet of warships at Vladivostok. Meanwhile, Paul Brasch's cover is blown and he is extracted by British commandos. Adolf Hitler has a seizure and suffers permanent brain and muscle damage; with the T4 program in mind, Heinrich Himmler chooses to suffocate him. Before launching an invasion of the Japanese Home Islands, the Soviets drop an atomic bomb on Litzmannstadt (that is, Łódź, Poland).

The Axis powers react as much as they can: Himmler authorizes the use of anthrax in a synthesized form which will persist for months. He also orders the Army to begin transferring divisions from the western front to the east, gradually bringing the Soviet advance to a halt. The USSR takes two more blows when a massive kamikaze strike cripples their Pacific Fleet, and the A-bomb building facility in Kamchatka is destroyed - both hits scored by the Japanese. The United States has secretly completed the Manhattan Project a few months earlier, with the help of thousands of people from the future Multi-National force. They now have a large enough stockpile of bombs to take on Germany, Japan and the USSR at the same time, if necessary. On the orders of President Roosevelt, a trio of B-52 bombers fly out of New Mexico and launch a raid deep into Germany. Berlin is utterly destroyed with three nuclear weapons.

In response to the U.S. blast on Berlin and the Japanese destroying the Soviet Pacific fleet at Kamchatka, the Soviets destroy Tokyo with an atomic bomb, killing the Emperor. The Axis Powers give in to unconditional surrender, ending the war in June 1944, but the damage has been done. The USSR has pushed into Asia securing gains in Persia, Afghanistan, Korea, Indochina and is probably going to share occupation of Japan with U.S. and Australia; in Europe the USSR has gone around Germany and has taken all of Eastern Europe including Greece, plus Northern Italy and chunks of Vichy France and Austria. The Western Allies are at odds with the Soviet Union, and the stage is set for another cold war. With the Axis defeated, most of the main characters move into the private sector and start anew.

== Historical characters featured ==
=== British Commonwealth ===
- Vera Atkins, British agent
- Thomas Blamey, Commander-in-Chief, Australian Army; Commander-in-Chief Allied Land Forces, South-West Pacific Area
- Winston Churchill, British Prime Minister
- John Curtin, Australian Prime Minister
- Edward Wood, 1st Earl of Halifax, British ambassador to the US
- Bernard Montgomery, General, commander of British forces in France
- Philip Mountbatten, Sub-Lieutenant, Royal Navy
- Kim Philby, Soviet agent in hiding; aids Skorzeny's commandos.
- Archibald Wavell, General, commander of British defences
- Prince Harry, younger brother of the 21st century British King, a Special Air Service Major, age 38.
- Elizabeth Windsor, 'future' Queen

=== Germany ===
- Walther Bothe, physicist
- Wernher von Braun, rocket scientist
- Kurt Diebner, physicist
- Walter Dornberger, German army rocket scientist
- Hermann Göring, Chief of the Luftwaffe
- Otto Hahn, physicist
- Werner Heisenberg, physicist
- Heinrich Himmler, SS Chief
- Adolf Hitler, Reichschancellor
- Ernst Kaltenbrunner, SS Security Service chief
- Günther von Kluge, Field Marshal
- Karl Albrecht Oberg, SS commander in Paris
- Otto Skorzeny, legendary Waffen-SS commando
- Albert Speer, Head of Armaments
- Franz Stangl, SS Gruppenfuhrer
- Kurt Zeitzler, Army Chief of Staff

=== Japan ===
- Hirohito, Emperor of Japan
- Hideyoshi Obata, General on Saipan
- Takijirō Ōnishi, Admiral of the tokkōtai (Kamikaze) squadrons
- Hiroshi Ōshima, General and ambassador to Germany
- Asaichi Tamai, Commander of a kamikaze unit
- Isoroku Yamamoto, Grand Admiral of the Combined Fleet
- Seki Yukio, Kamikaze pilot

=== United States ===
- Henry Arnold, General, United States Army. Commanding officer in charge of the U.S. Army Air Force.
- Dwight D. Eisenhower, General, United States Army. Supreme Allied Commander of the European Theater of Operations.
- Leslie Groves, General, United States Army. Director of the Manhattan Project.
- W. Averell Harriman, ambassador to the USSR
- John Fitzgerald Kennedy, Captain, United States Navy. Commanding Officer, U.S.S. Armanno, a Halsey-class guided missile destroyer.
- Ernest King, Commander-in-Chief, United States Navy. Chief of Naval Operations.
- Douglas MacArthur, General, United States Army. Commander of Allied Forces, Southwest Pacific Theater of Operations.
- George Marshall, General, United States Army. Chairman of the Joint Chiefs of Staff.
- Joseph McCarthy, 'future' United States Senator (killed in combat)
- Marilyn Monroe, 'future' actress.
- George S. Patton, General, commander of US forces in France
- Elvis Presley, 'future' rock star.
- Jackie Robinson, 'future' baseball player with the U.S. 761st Tank Battalion
- Franklin D. Roosevelt, President of the United States.
- Raymond Spruance, Admiral, United States Navy. Commander of the Combined Pacific Task Force.
- Henry Stimson, U.S. Secretary of War.

=== USSR ===
- Lavrenty Beria, Head of NKVD
- Ivan Konev, General, Red Army
- Igor Kurchatov, physicist
- Nikolai Gerasimovich Kuznetsov, People's Commissar of the Navy
- Georgy Malenkov, CPSU member
- Lev Mekhlis, political chief of the Red Army
- Vyacheslav Molotov, Foreign Minister
- Joseph Stalin, General Secretary of the CPSU
- Semyon Timoshenko, Defense Minister
- Ivan Stepanovich Yumashev, Admiral, Sea of Okhotsk
- Georgy Zhukov, General, Red Army

== Critical response ==
In general, Final Impact was less well received than the prior two books. It picks up 18 months after Weapons of Choice, a transition which some readers criticized as too jarring. Other reviews noted the large number of plot points which had not been addressed properly, and the disjointed narrative structure used to depict the war.
