= Brisbane Arts Theatre =

Theatre company in Queensland, Australia

- Interactive map of Brisbane Arts Theatre
- Address: 210 Petrie Terrace; Brisbane; Australia
- Coordinates: 27.4616°S 153.0143°E
- Capacity: 151

Construction
- Opened: 1961
- Reopened: 1965
- Rebuilt: 1964
- Architect: John Dalton

Website
- artstheatre.com.au

Brisbane Arts Theatre refers to an independent theatre company in Brisbane, Queensland, Australia. It is one of the oldest theatre companies in Brisbane, being established since 1936. The name historically also refers to the theatre building in Petrie Terrace which was owned by the company from 1961 to 2022 and used by the company until 2024.

== Theatre company history ==
Brisbane Arts Theatre was founded in 1936 as Brisbane Amateur Theatres by Jean Trundle and Vic Hardgraves. The company's name was changed in 1947. Its early seasons up until the early 1960s consisted of five productions, each with three-night seasons in venues such as All Saint's Hall, Princess Theatre, Theatre Royal and Albert Hall. It also presented 12 to 14 performances of an annual junior Shakespeare play and three one-act plays throughout its season at various venues, including the Brisbane branch of the Royal Over-Seas League.

Brisbane Arts Theatre's first production in its new venue on Petrie Terrace was The Multi-Coloured Umbrella by Armidale playwright Barbara Mary Vernon, which opened on 16 September 1961. Its first full season in its new home included nine plays of up to 20 performances each.

During the rebuilding of the venue (see below) between 1964 and 1965, the company persisted with its seasons off-site. Following the completion of the rebuilt venue, ten plays per season were performed, each consisting of 19 performances over a five-week duration. In 1965, an annual children's theatre season was added with the first production featuring Carol Burns as Gretel in Hansel and Gretel.

The company was funded only by box office revenue until government funding began in the form of a small annual Queensland state government grant in 1969, which ceased in the 1990s under the Goss Labor government. It has since again operated solely on performance and theatre bar revenue and theatre workshop tuition fees.

In recent years, the theatre's annual seasons have consisted of five to seven productions each from its mainhouse and children's theatre divisions. Its recent high-grossing productions have included the stage debuts of three plays based on novels by John Birmingham, adapted by Simon Bedak (He Died with a Felafel in His Hand, The Tasmanian Babes Fiasco and How to Be a Man), a once-reprised production of We Will Rock You, and productions of Avenue Q in 2012, 2014, 2015, 2017 (including a regional Queensland tour) and 2018. The company claims to be "Brisbane's home of Avenue Q."

== Venue history ==
Brisbane Arts Theatre was the first theatre company in Brisbane to operate its own theatre premises. It no longer does due to financial difficulties. The venue is located at 210 Petrie Terrace, in the suburb of Petrie Terrace. With 152 seats, it is sold as 149 in the stalls and gallery combined and features a small courtyard and a bar.

The property, formerly Dan's, a second-hand shop, was purchased in June 1959 for £6,000 and redeveloped as a theatre. Initially reported to seat 220, it opened in September 1961 with a single-level, raked 144-seat auditorium and a 10ft-deep stage. The first floor accommodated the costume department and office. The theatre was officially opened by Premier of Queensland Frank Nicklin on 22 September.

At around 3am on 31 May 1964, the theatre was heavily damaged by fire, caused by an electrical fault in the toilet block. Upon initial assessment of the damage, the theatre director and insurance representatives agreed that the building could be repaired within a matter of weeks; however, smouldering materials ignited a second blaze at 8.30am, which resulted in extensive damage throughout. The Commonwealth Trading Bank loaned £12,000 for the rebuilding of the theatre based on a new design by the initial architect, John Dalton. It included the addition of a dress circle, increased stalls capacity, a 25 ft deep stage and two dressing rooms under the stage. The theatre reopened on 25 June 1965, the reconstruction totalling £20,000. The venue's architectural shape served as the inspiration behind the company's new logo in 2014.

In the late 1960s, the adjoining cottage–a deceased estate–was purchased for £6,000 and later, in August 1971, a two-storey building at 222 Petrie Terrace was added to the complex for $16,000. The cottage, at number 206, was renamed after Cor Boogaart, a workshop manager for the theatre for 27 years. The property at number 222 housed the theatre's wardrobe department and rehearsal space until its sale in 2011. Cor Boogart Cottage, having previously been used as a rehearsal venue, now houses the wardrobe division and construction workshop downstairs. The previous two rehearsal venues were renovated between 1976 and 1978 at the same time as the construction of the theatre's current office and bar. The Cor Boogaart Cottage was again refurbished following the sale of 222 in May 2011.

Brisbane Arts Theatre no longer owns its own theatre. It has operated a registered training organisation, offering accredited certificates in live production and technical services.

== Sale to Ad Astra Theatre Company ==
In 2022, the theatre at 210 Petrie Terrace was put up for sale following financial difficulties created by the COVID-19 pandemic and the absence of funding from any level of government. It was sold in February 2023 to Dan and Fiona Kennedy at Ad Astra Theatre Company in 2023 for $3,000,000 (AUD). Ad Astra will allow the Brisbane Arts Theatre company to continue to use the space.

In 2024, it was announced that the theatre company would perform its last production, as residents of the Petrie Terrace theatre. Its final performance was on 1 June 2024. The theatre company will continue to perform but at other venues. Under the terms of the 2023 sale, the name Brisbane Arts Theatre will continue as the company's names and not the theatre's name.

Brisbane Arts Theatre's office and costumes department are now located at Unit 3A, 70 Prospect Terrace, Kelvin Grove. The company continues to provide children's and teen's Drama workshops and will continue to produce theatre productions at various venues across Brisbane.

== Notable people ==
Performers at the theatre include:

- Roslyn Atkinson (later the judge in the trial of Daniel Morcombe's killer)
- Bunney Brooke
- Carol Burns
- Dale Camilleri
- Michael Caton
- Penny Downie
- Jennifer Flowers
- Wayne Goss (whose government cut the annual grant to the company)
- Judith McGrath
- Barry Otto
- John Stanton
- Ian Thomson, actor and director
- Kate Wilson

== See also ==
- Arts and culture in Brisbane
