= Beau Walker =

Australian professional surfer and television presenter

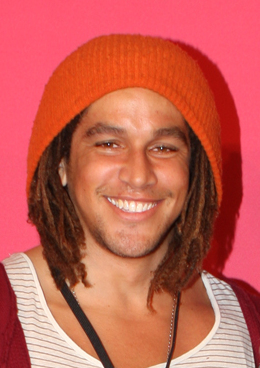
- Walker in 2013
- Born: 13 April 1985 (age 41); Sydney, New South Wales, Australia
- Occupations: Surfer, actor, television presenter
- Years active: 2006-2015

Beau Walker (born 13 April 1985) is former junior Australian surfer who has represented Australia in national and international championships. He is also known for his various hosting duties on the Nine Network (Channel Nine) programmes such as The Shak, Mortified, Kitchen Whiz, and Pyramid, often using the moniker of 'Nitro'.

== Early life ==
Beau Walker has one brother named Mark. He was born in Sydney, however moved to Byron Bay when he was 12. He began surfing off local beaches and started entering competitions before his fourteenth birthday. In high school, Walker balanced studies with commitments on the Pro Juniors circuit, winning numerous titles. He was given his first surfboard when he was only seven and has been surfing ever since. Surfing soon extended to different sports like football and Bicycle motocross(BMX). In February 2005, at the age of seventeen, Walker met board maker Cameron Bond who then designed a surfboard for him called the 'Nitro' model.

== Personal life ==
In 2012, Walker was arrested at a casino nightclub in Pyrmont, New South Wales. Police confirmed they were investigating the 27-year-old over two tablets found in his possession.

== Television ==
While competing in a televised surfing competition, Walker was spotted by Nine Network and they decided he would be perfect to play the part of Nitro on the then new show The Shak. Channel Nine then placed him in guest roles on shows such as Mortified and Pyramid. When The Shak was cancelled in early 2010 the nine network promised to find other roles for the cast. It was announced Walker would front a new children's show in 2011, Kitchen Whiz, in the former time-slot of The Shak at Home.

== Television career ==
Year	Title	Episodes	Role	Notes
2006 – 2009	The Shak	Numerous	Nitro	
2007	Mortified	1	Surf reporter	
2009 – 2010	The Shak at Home	120	Nitro	
2009 – 2010	Pyramid	11	Contestant	
2011	Kitchen Whiz	130 (Planned)	Co-host	

== Surfing career ==
Year	Title	Placing	Event
2005	Billabong World Junior Championships	N/A	Under 18's
2006	Australian Titles	4th	Under 16+18's
2006	Australian Titles	4th	Under 16+18's
2006	Quik World titles	5th	Under 18's
2006	The Australian Captain	N/A	Under 18's
