= He Died with a Felafel in His Hand (film) =

2001 film by Richard Lowenstein

- DVD cover
- Directed by: Richard Lowenstein
- Written by: Richard Lowenstein
- Based on: He Died with a Felafel in His Hand by John Birmingham
- Produced by: Andrew McPhail; Helen Panckhurst; Domenico Procacci
- Starring: Noah Taylor; Emily Hamilton; Sophie Lee
- Cinematography: Andrew de Groot
- Distributed by: Roadshow Entertainment
- Release date: 30 August 2001
- Running time: 107 minutes
- Country: Australia
- Language: English
- Budget: A$3,900,000

He Died with a Felafel in His Hand is a 2001 Australian comedy-drama film directed by Richard Lowenstein and starring Noah Taylor. The film draws on the 1994 memoir of the same name and consists of a series of vignettes from a young man's experience of sharing accommodation with a variety of characters. There is also a graphic adaptation of the novel.

== Plot ==
The film opens with Danny discovering his friend Flip dead in their flat. It then flashes back nine months to Brisbane, where Danny and Flip live in a house with other eccentric roommates. The house, known as the Queenslander, has characteristic features, such as wooden stilts, verandas and open rooms.

In Brisbane, Taylor, a Russian with military obsessions, engages in random acts of violence. Danny, Flip, Milo and Otis have a discussion about love and make drunken confessions. Sam, an English girl, joins the conversation. Later, Danny visits a Centrelink office where an officer ridicules his aspirations of being a writer. Back at home, Sam challenges Danny's claim to be a writer, and Danny expresses his desire for teletype paper to inspire his writing. Anya, a mysterious foreigner, arrives to inquire about a room in the house. Danny introduces her to the other roommates. She declares herself a strict vegetarian.

Milo and Otis compete for Anya's affections, while Danny struggles to find inspiration for his writing. Thugs visit the house demanding unpaid rent, and the residents fail to impress them with their claims. The thugs give them a week to pay. Anya plans a party and invites her friends. During the party, a pagan ritual takes place, and skinheads, along with Taylor's invited gang, confront the thugs. Chaos ensues and the house is vandalized. Danny and Satomi quickly leave, with their belongings, exchanging heartfelt words with Flip before departing.

Danny moves to a shared flat in Melbourne, where he attends his ex-girlfriend's wedding. He finds solace in writing and encounters Sam, who seeks comfort in his presence. They share a profound moment. Later, a disturbing incident involving police and drugs occurs. Iain is injured, and Danny contemplates leaving town. Sam decides to stay.

Three months later, Danny is residing in Sydney, with Nina and Dirk as his roommates. Tensions rise between them. Sam and Anya arrive and become a couple. They urge Danny to call his mother. A house meeting is called, and news of a shooting in Melbourne is revealed. Sam and Anya break up after Sam catches Danny and Anya making out. Sam leaves, angrily telling Danny that his life is a mess and he'll never be a writer. Danny becomes depressed and locks himself in his room for several days. One night he emerges, woken by the TV, to discover Flip dead from an overdose, with a felafel in his hand.

Danny decides to give up writing, discarding his books and throwing his typewriter into Sydney Harbour. The film ends with all the housemates gathering to give Flip a pagan-style funeral ceremony. Afterwards Anya gives Danny some mail, with a cheque for $25,000 from Penthouse magazine for his published story. Anya and Nina move to France together, and Sam, having reconciled with Danny, gives him a roll of teletype paper to inspire his writing.

== Cast ==
- Noah Taylor as Daniel "Danny" Kirkhope
- Emily Hamilton as Sam
- Romane Bohringer as Anya
- Alex Menglet as Taylor
- Brett Stewart (actor) as Flip
- Damian Walshe-Howling as Milo
- Torquil Neilson as Otis
- Sophie Lee as Nina
- Francis McMahon as Dirk
- Ian Hughes as Iain the Socialist
- Robert Rimmer as Derek the Bank Clerk
- Sayuri Tanoue as Satomi Tiger
- Linal Haft as Brisbane Goon 1
- Nathan Kotzur as Brisbane Goon 2
- Haskel Daniel as Jabber
- Skye Wansey as Detective O'Neill
- Ivan Tatarovic as 'Uptight Ivan'
- Tim Robertson as Melbourne Detective 1
- Robert Morgan as Melbourne Detective 2
- Clayton Jacobson as Repo Man
- Scott Major as Welfare Officer
- Pascal Delair as the Bride
- Wendy Roberts as Cashmere Sweater Babe
- Graeme Carroll as Rugby man
- Terry Serio as Sydney Policeman 1
- Steve Bastoni as Sydney Policeman 2
- Chris Samios as Young Singing Skin
- Keeryn Gill as Walking Mother
- Benjamin Rich as Baby in Stroller
- Rani Hayman as Flower girl
- Stuart Nicholls as Groom
- Harry Brentnall as Groomsman
- Norris Blanks as Male Guest
- Jilly Ferguson as Female Guest
- Jon Wicks as Photographer
- Simon Wheeler as O'Neill's Partner
- Matt Dunk as Dirk's Friend
- Michael Fawaz as Taxi Driver
- Skye Gamblin as Cashmere Sweater orgasmic vocal
- Glenn Newnham as Brisbane Landlord phone vocal

== Box office ==
The film grossed $820,999 at the box office in Australia.

== Reception ==
According to InReview magazine, the film, in contrast to the stage version, "totally missed the spirit of the book."

== See also ==
- Cinema of Australia
