= Lab Rats Challenge =

- Genre: Game Show
- Directed by: Ian Munro
- Presented by: Drew Jarvis; Nicole Dixon (2008); Aleisha Rose (2012–2014)
- Country of origin: Australia
- Original language: English
- No. of series: 4
- No. of episodes: 260

Production
- Production locations: Brisbane, Queensland
- Running time: 30 minutes (including commercials)
- Production company: Beyond Productions

Original release
- Network: Nine Network (2008); Seven Network (2012); ABC3 (2013–2014)
- Release: 4 August 2008 – 12 August 2014

Lab Rats Challenge is an Australian children's game show. The program began broadcasting on 4 August 2008 at 4 pm on the Nine Network with hosts Drew Jarvis and Nicole Dixon. On 5 March 2012, the show moved to the Seven Network with Aleisha Rose replacing Dixon for the revived series. On 12 February 2013 at 10:15 am, the show moved to ABC3 (later known as 'ABC ME'). The show has also been broadcast on Cartoon Network.

In contrast to other Australian children's game shows such as Sharky's Friends, A*mazing, and Go Go Stop, which are filmed on a large set in front of a live studio audience, Lab Rats Challenge uses several smaller sets resembling an abandoned science laboratory as well as special effects sequences inserted in post-production. It is filmed in Brisbane's Channel 9 studio on Mount Coot-tha, Queensland.

== Gameplay ==
The challenges on the show are born from science experiments, such as guessing how many drops of water will fit on a twenty cent coin. Each episode's final challenge, The Labyrinth, features the children competitors racing through a series of physical and mental challenges. The 1st pair to make it through the labyrinth gets cheesed at the end. This is similar in style to the maze on early 1990s Australian kids game show A*mazing and 1990s American show Legends of the Hidden Temple.

== Rounds ==
- Nano Challenge – In this round, both teams simultaneously try and complete the challenge and achieve their goal. If they succeed, the team wins 10 points. Its time limit is unlimited. It could be a minute, half a minute or even two.
- What'll Happen If – In this round, Drew and Nicole will describe the experiment and both teams, in private must make a hypothesis/guess as to what will happen. After both teams guesses are made, Drew and Nicole will perform the experiment. If their guess is right, the team wins 5 points.
- Method Madness – In this round, teams perform the task either simultaneously or one at a time. If the task is to be performed one team at a time, the trailing team will decide whether to go first or second. If there is a tie, the Randomizer will then be done to find the winning team. Whoever goes second will: get shrunk by Drew and surrounded by a metal cage with a cat on guard (season 1), or 'lose' their heads, through the use of CGI (season 2) to prevent them from seeing their opposing team in action. Teams will perform a task. The winning team gets 15 points. In the season 2, the trailing team got to perform the challenge first and the leading team had their heads relocated.
- Rat Race – This is a race to completing the game. Whoever wins, gets 30 points. Along the way, status accelerators are on offer with 20, 15, 10 and 5 points. Obstacles include wire traps, cargo nets, dark room (where the exit is on the ground), slide, ball pits, maze and Cheese Dump. Every episode has a major challenge where teams have to do a task such as filling a cylinder to the line, building a skeleton or operating a crane. In the season 2, as well as trying to find the exit to the dark room, teams have to find an eyeball before leaving the dark room. Teams could also intentionally just exit the dark room without finding the eyeball in order to save up time in the race. By doing so, the team wasn't eligible to gain any status accelerator points. At the cargo net, contestants have to climb up two sets and crawl over the ground. After that they slide down a slide and get the status accelerators. After finishing the major task comes the maze which they have to make their way through the correct doors.

If there is a tie after What'll Happen If or the Rat Race, there is a tie breaker known as the Randomizer. Both teams are given a beaker of water along with two similar-looking containers of white powder. Only one would cause a chemical reaction when placed in the water. The team that wins the Rat Race gets to choose their powder first. Both teams pour their powder in the water and the one that has a chemical reaction wins 5 points. This tie breaker is completely based on chance.

== International broadcasts ==
- In the United Kingdom, Lab Rats Challenge was screened on POP and Kix (until December 2012, and was replaced by Scaredy Squirrel in January 2013); at around the same time CBBC began airing a similar UK-produced format, Richard Hammond's Blast Lab.
- In Singapore, the series is screened on Okto and Channel 5.
- In Malaysia, the series was aired on Astro TVIQ.
- In Southeast Asia, this series will be airing on Lifetime starts October 12, 2026, every day at 12:30 pm to 1:00 pm and same day as Malaysia and Singapore

== See also ==
- List of Australian television series
