= Axis of Time =

Alternate history novel series by John Birmingham

- Weapons of Choice, Designated Targets, Final Impact, Stalin's Hammer
- Author: John Birmingham
- Country: Australia
- Language: English
- Genre: Alternate history, Science fiction
- Publisher: Macmillan
- Published: June 2004 – ongoing
- Media type: Print (hardback & paperback)
- No. of books: 4
- Followed by: The Disappearance Series

The Axis of Time trilogy is an alternative history series of novels written by Australian journalist and author John Birmingham, from Macmillan Publishing.

The novels deal with the radical alteration of the history of World War II and the socio-historical changes that result when a technologically advanced naval task force from the year 2021 is accidentally transported back through time to 1942.

== Plot ==
In 2021, a radical Islamic terrorist movement has declared a global jihad against the Western world and established a Caliphate in Indonesia, initiating a wholesale slaughter of Chinese nationals there. In response, a US-led multinational task force of advanced warships and submarines sails to Indonesia to launch a counterattack against the Caliphate forces and retake the archipelago. With the fleet is a research vessel, the Nagoya, which is testing top-secret weapons and stealth systems that use the latest developments in quantum physics.

As the task force lies at anchor off the coast of East Timor preparing for deployment, the Nagoya conducts a full-scale test of its new systems but there is a catastrophic accident—the experiment generates a massive rift in the time-space continuum, completely destroying the Nagoya and sending most of the fleet back in time to 1942.

Many of the 2021 ships materialize in the middle of the US fleet that is steaming to engage the Japanese at the Battle of Midway, including one vessel which materializes into the structure of a 1942 ship, with horrific results. When the mystery fleet suddenly appears, the Americans mistake them for the enemy (due to the presence of Japanese vessels in the 2021 fleet) and they begin firing on them. With the crews of the 2021 fleet rendered helpless by "transition sickness", the computerized battle systems on their ships automatically activate, inflicting heavy damage and thousands of casualties on the 1942 fleet until the two forces work out what has happened and halt the battle. As the nature of the event dawns on the two fleets, the two commanders strike an uneasy truce and the combined fleet heads back to Pearl Harbor. The Americans then launch an intensive study into the 2021 fleet's futuristic computer and weapons technology, as well as the wealth of historical information which describes their own future – although many items of technology from the future fleet are stolen by unscrupulous sailors from 1942 and sold to the criminal underworld.

Matters are further complicated by the fact that the chaotic nature of the Nagoya's "time bubble" has transported some 2021 ships to locations far from the main group, and these vessels variously fall into the hands of the Japanese, the Germans and the Soviets. After the Japanese capture an Indonesian ship from the 2021 fleet, they discover what they did not know in the conventional version of history – that the US fleet had not been crippled by the Pearl Harbor attack, as they thought, and that the Americans have broken their military codes and are fully aware of the Japanese battle plans. Acting on these revelations, Admiral Yamamoto immediately turns his fleet around, and the Battle of Midway never takes place.

Another vessel is captured by the Germans and as they learn more about the future outcome of the war they halt and abandon their ill-fated invasion of Russia and prepare for an all-out assault on the United Kingdom. Adolf Hitler and Joseph Stalin become allies and purge their military forces of anyone they believe to be a traitor.

The series goes on to explore the far-reaching effects of the Transition, which radically alters not merely the balance of power between the Axis and the Allies, but the entire course of WWII and global history. The Soviet Union uses the treaty with Germany to assemble a powerful and massive military and launch a large scale invasion into Asia and Eastern Europe, conquering a vast amount of territory.

The plot shares a premise with the 1980 film The Final Countdown, about a modern USN aircraft carrier which travels back in time to just before the 1941 attack on Pearl Harbor. The plot also has similarities to that of the series Zipang, about a Japanese missile destroyer transported back in time right before the Battle of Midway.

== Books in series ==
- World War 2.1: Weapons of Choice (2004), ISBN 0-7329-1199-0
- World War 2.2: Designated Targets (2005), ISBN 0-345-45714-5
- World War 2.3: Final Impact (2007), ISBN 0-345-45716-1
- Stalin's Hammer: Rome (2012), novella, ISBN 978-1743341391
- Stalin's Hammer: Cairo (2016), ebook only novella
- Stalin's Hammer: Paris (2016), ebook only novella
- Stalin's Hammer: The Complete Sequence (2017), ISBN 978-0648003625, all three novellas (Rome, Cairo and Paris) have been repackaged as a single volume
- World War 3.1 (2023), ISBN 0-648-63311-X, was announced on John Birmingham's blog in 2021.
- World War 3.2 (2025), ISBN 0-648-63315-2

== Allusions ==
Birmingham names several minor characters after contemporary nonfictional people:

- Venero Armanno, Brisbane novelist. Appeared as Lieutenant Veni Armanno.
- Paul Brasch, Brisbane comedian. Appeared as Major Paul Brasch.
- Karen Halabi, a journalist who has written for the Sydney Morning Herald, appeared as Captain Karen Halabi, captain of HMS Trident, a major character
- Piers Akerman and Andrew Bolt, conservative Australian columnists. Appeared as SAS demolitionists.
- Dale Brown, Tom Clancy, Stephen Euin Cobb, and Garth Nix - thriller writers appearing as counterboarding specialists aboard USS Leyte Gulf.
- Eric Flint (alternate history author) appeared as a Secret Service agent. The fictional town of Grantville, West Virginia, from his 1632 series is referred to as Dan Black's home town. In addition, it was mentioned that 1632 and its sequels were turned into movies, directed by Peter Jackson.
- William R. Forstchen (sci-fi/alternate history author) referred to as a fringe 'professor' who wrote an underground bio of J. Edgar Hoover.
- Bill O'Reilly and Jerry Springer are mentioned as both being United States senators in the 21st century.
- Matthew Reilly (Australian action/sci-fi author) appears as a lieutenant on the USS Leyte Gulf. Redshirted.
- S.M. Stirling (sci-fi/alternate history author) appeared as a Secret Service agent. His Draka series is referenced when one of the characters remarks that, with all the events of the past year, he would not be surprised to hear of a new race of super-Nazis arising in South Africa, and a second time when a character mentions that the Draka series has been turned into movies by Steven Spielberg.
- Harry Turtledove, one of the most prominent alternate history authors, appears as "Commander Turteltaub", an aide to FDR. The President at one point asks him whether the space lizards have invaded yet, a reference to Turtledove's Worldwar series.
- Mike Judge, creator of Beavis and Butt-Head, King of the Hill, The Goode Family and Office Space, commanding officer of the USS Hillary Clinton.
- James H. Cobb, Robert Dessaix, and Jean-Paul Sartre are namesakes for naval ships.
- Hillary Clinton is also the namesake of a naval ship, an American aircraft carrier. From the perspective of the series' 2021 setting, Clinton is a former President who led the country during a war and was later assassinated.
- Phillip McGregor (co-author of Space Opera (FGU), Rigger Black Book #1 (FGU) and many other roleplaying games and supplements) appears as the Pilot of one of the Dakota gunships used to decimate German Paratroops taking part in Operation Sea Dragon, a thank you for helping provide the author with some historical background material as part of a discussion on the book on the soc.history.what-if usenet newsgroup.
- Tim Horan and Peter FitzSimons (former rugby union players and in 'fitzys' case also journalist and author) appear as Australian military personnel
- The French ship Robert Dessaix, actually an Australian novelist, was commanded by René Goscinny with First Officer Albert Uderzo, the creators of Asterix.
- SAS Troopers Peter Hamilton (a British science-fiction writer) and Sir Vivian Richards (one of the greatest cricketers of all time).
- Colonel Harry Windsor of the British SAS (Prince Harry) appears as himself, obviously in no need of tuckerization.
- Rosanna Natoli is a reporter/presenter for Channel Seven News Queensland Australia. Was a 21st Century reporter murdered in Hawaii by a Japanese officer.
- Gia Dimarco, a female pornographic actress. Is a lieutenant in the USN, stationed in the USN Hillary Clinton.
- Arthur Clarke, a predominant science fiction writer, is referred to as Private Clarke during the invasion of Normandy.
- Amanda Lohrey is an Australian writer and novelist - there is a Lieutenant Amanda Lohrey in the RAN - Intelligence Officer, HMAS Havoc

Birmingham names at least one place (USSR Demidenko facility) after controversial Australian journalist and author Helen Darville, who won several major literary awards for her book The Hand That Signed the Paper, written under the pseudonym Helen Demidenko. Darville initially presented herself as being of Ukrainian ancestry but this was subsequently exposed as a hoax.

== Adaptation ==
In September 2021, it was announced Luke Sparke is developing a television adaptation through his Sparke Films banner.

== See also ==
- List of Axis of Time characters
- The Final Countdown (film)
- Worldwar
- Zipang (manga)
- Hypothetical Axis victory in World War II – Other depictions of Nazi Germany/Axis/World War II alternate history.
