= Kitchen Whiz =

- Genre: Game show
- Presented by: Beau Walker (2011-2012); Laurent Vancam (2011); Alice Zaslavsky (2013-2015); Andy Trieu (ninja, 2011-2015)
- Country of origin: Australia
- Original language: English
- No. of series: 9
- No. of episodes: 585

Production
- Running time: 30 minutes (including commercials)
- Production company: SLR Productions

Original release
- Network: Nine Network (2011-2012); 9Go! (2013-2015)
- Release: 21 February 2011 – 2015

Kitchen Whiz is an Australian children's cooking game show on the Nine Network and 9Go!. Children test their skills in the kitchen by completing fun challenges with a partner in a short amount of time. The team who has the most points by the end of the episode goes home with prizes ranging from experiences to cooking appliances.

The series began airing on 21 February 2011, presented by Beau Walker aka Nitro with Andy Trieu as the ninja. In 2013, the show returned with a new host Alice Zaslavsky and a focus on education and interactive media with the release of a Kitchen Whiz Digital App.
