= The Tasmanian Babes Fiasco =

Novel by John Birmingham

- Author: John Birmingham
- Illustrator: Darren Roach
- Cover artist: Alex Snellgrove
- Language: English
- Publisher: Duffy & Snellgrove
- Publication date: 1997
- Publication place: Australia
- Media type: Print (Paperback)
- Pages: 375 pp
- ISBN: 1-875989-29-3
- OCLC: 222421836
- Preceded by: He Died with a Felafel in His Hand

The Tasmanian Babes Fiasco is a 1997 sequel novel by John Birmingham. It involves several prominent characters from the first novel, He Died with a Felafel in His Hand, primarily Taylor the Cabbie, Jabba the Hutt, Thunderbird Ron, Brainthrust Leonard, Missy, Elroy and Stacy. The first book is written in diary form whereas the sequel is written as a novel. The Tasmanian Babes Fiasco was first published in 1997 and reprinted in 1997 and 1998.

== Plot ==
The residents of a sharehouse in York Street, Taringa take in a new boarder calling himself Jordan. At first the housemates are suspicious yet tolerant of their new tenant and his strange behaviour. However, it is soon discovered that Jordan has absconded with five weeks' worth of the household's rent and utility money. What is more, he has been using the address to perpetrate fraud against the Department of Social Security, bringing the government agency's suspicion upon the house's dole-collecting members. Matters are further compounded when the owners of the property appear with a work crew declaring their intention to demolish the house unless the owed rent is paid by the following Monday. The remaining housemates split their meagre resources into tracking down Jordan and coming up with the owed money.

== Adaptation ==
In 2010 The Tasmanian Babes Fiasco's stage version premiered at Brisbane Arts Theatre.

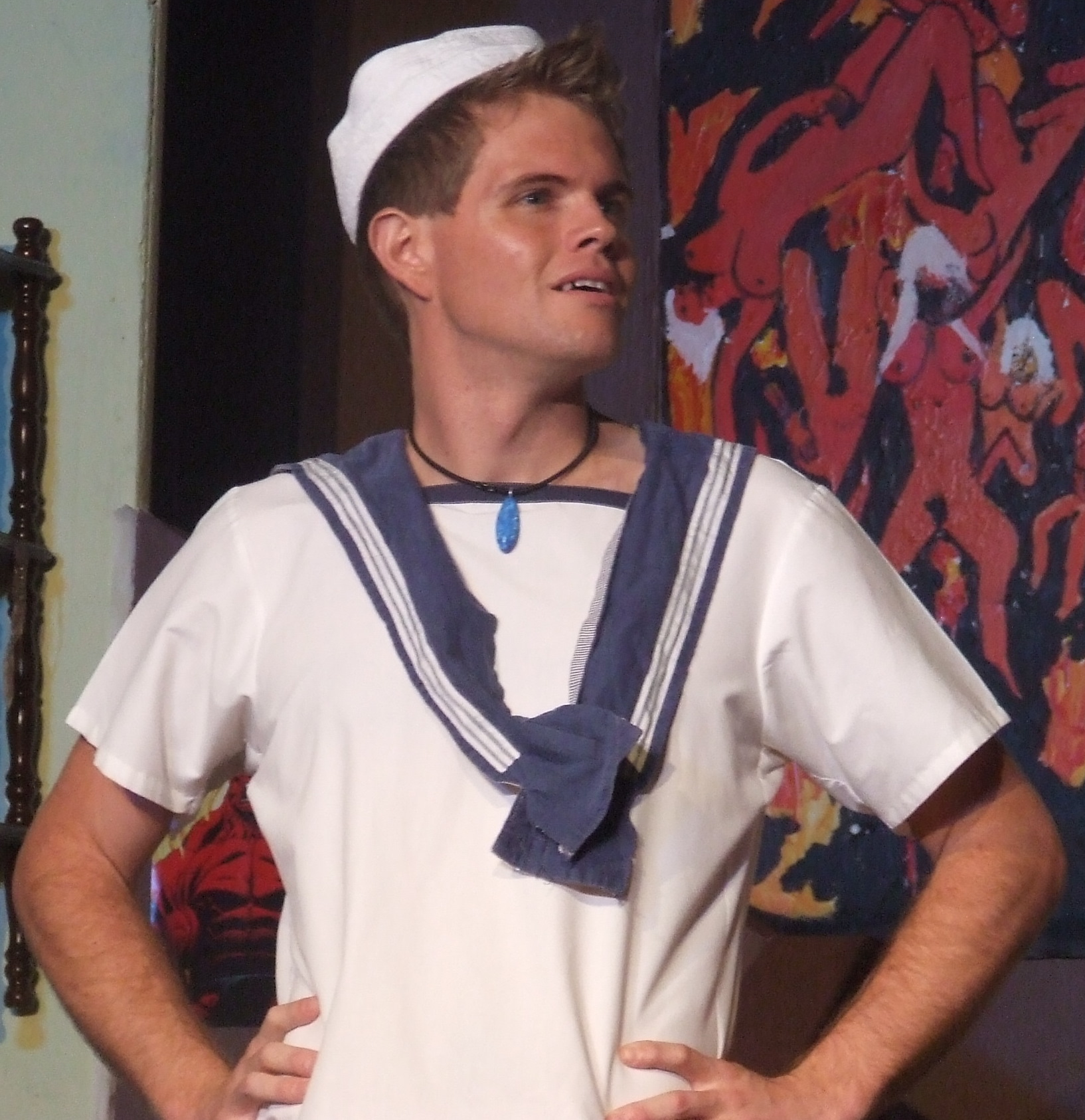
Drew Jarvis in the 2010 stage production of The Tasmanian Babes Fiasco at Brisbane Arts Theatre.
