= Tuckerization =

Humorous use of real names in fiction

Tuckerization (or tuckerism) is the act of using a person's name in an original story as an in-joke. The term is derived from Wilson Tucker, a pioneering American science fiction writer, fan and fanzine editor, who made a practice of using his friends' names for minor characters in his stories. For example, Tucker named a character after Lee Hoffman in his novel The Long Loud Silence, and after Walt Willis in Wild Talent.

In most cases, tuckerization is used for "bit parts" (minor characters), an opportunity for the author to create an homage to a friend or respected colleague. However, an author sometimes attaches a friend's name, description, or identifiable characteristics to a major character, and in some novels, nearly all characters represent friends, colleagues, or prominent persons the author knows. When that happens, tuckerization can rise to the level of a roman à clef.

Tuckerization is generally for wink-and-nod homages: characters with suspiciously similar names or features. It should not be confused with the direct inclusion of real people in fiction, a form of story that is usually called biographical fiction when it is the main focus.

== Notable examples ==
Before Wilson Tucker (1914–2006), Mary Jane, Buster Brown's sweetheart after whom the Mary Jane shoe style was named, was inspired by Richard Felton Outcault's daughter of the same name. In Outcault's and his daughter's own words, she was the only character drawn from life in the Buster Brown strip (1902- ) although "she resembled Outcault's wife".

In the early 1930s, before Jerry Siegel and Joe Shuster created the comic-book superhero Superman, they had written and illustrated a fanzine story, "The Reign of the Superman", featuring a super-powered villain. The story includes one of the first tuckerizations: a character named after fandom-famous Forrest J Ackerman (1916–2008).

H. P. Lovecraft's acquaintance Robert Bloch published "The Shambler from the Stars", in the September 1935 Weird Tales; its unnamed, doomed protagonist is a weird-fiction author closely resembling Lovecraft. As a genial return, Lovecraft's "The Haunter of the Dark", published in the December 1936 Weird Tales, introduces Robert Harrison Blake, who shares Bloch's Milwaukee street address and is killed off in an equally horrible fashion. Bloch wrote a third story after Lovecraft's death, "The Shadow from the Steeple" (1950), in which the events of the first two stories are further explored.

Evelyn Waugh featured absurd, preposterous or dishonest characters named Cruttwell, after C. R. M. F. Cruttwell, the dean of Hertford College when Waugh was a student and Waugh's tutor, who tried to get Waugh to fulfil the conditions of his scholarship and study. It was only after Cruttwell suffered a mental breakdown in 1939 and his death in 1941 that his name disappeared from Waugh's works. In his novels up to The Anti-Death League (1966), Kingsley Amis featured characters named Caton, after R.A. Caton of the Fortune Press, who published Amis's first book of poems, Bright November, however in Amis's view, did not promote it properly. More mercifully than Waugh, in The Anti-Death League, Caton dies and his name disappears from Amis's work.

Philip K. Dick employed tuckerization in his 1964 short story "Waterspider", in which he sent fellow author Poul Anderson ahead in time to a future where science fiction authors were seen as having precognitive abilities. In a sense, Dick tuckerized himself in 1981's Valis, creating a character named Horselover Fat, Dick's translation of his own name. Other characters in this novel include David, who is based on Tim Powers, and Kevin represents K.W. Jeter.

Beginning in 1971, Isaac Asimov tuckerized several friends in sixty-six short mystery stories published mostly in Ellery Queen's Mystery Magazine and later collected into six volumes. Himself a member of a club called the Trap Door Spiders, Asimov invented minor bafflements brought by guests to his "Black Widowers," a fictional men-only dining club, where the puzzle would be discussed and solved. Asimov's friends and their fictional counterparts are:

- L. Sprague de Camp = Geoffrey Avalon, a patent attorney
- Lester del Rey = Dr. Emmanuel Rubin, a mystery novelist acquainted with Asimov
- John Drury Clark = Dr. James Drake, a chemist
- Gilbert Cant = Thomas Trumbull, a government cryptographer
- Lin Carter = Mario Gonzalo, an artist
- Donald R. Bensen = Roger Halsted, a high school mathematics teacher

Club waiter Henry Jackson, who inevitably solves the mystery after the diners have chewed over the details, was inspired by P. G. Wodehouse's character Jeeves. The deceased founder of the club, Ralph Ottur, was based on the real-life founder of the Trap Door Spiders, Fletcher Pratt. In one story, "The Cross of Lorraine," a guest is a stage magician, The Amazing Larri, and he was based on James Randi; an arrogant science writer Mortimer Stellar ("When No Man Pursueth") was based on Asimov himself.

In his 1980-1981 To the Stars series, Harry Harrison has a character named "Old Lundwall, who commands the Sverige, should have retired a decade ago, but he is still the best there is." Sam J Lundwall is a well-known Swedish science fiction publisher and writer, as well as the godfather of Harrison's daughter, and Sverige is the Swedish word for Sweden.

A tuckerization can also be the use of a person's character or personal attributes with a new name as an in-joke, such as Ian Arnstein in S. M. Stirling's 1998 Island in the Sea of Time trilogy, clearly modeled on his good friend Harry Turtledove, albeit an alternate history Turtledove.

Larry Niven and Jerry Pournelle have written works in which nearly all the characters represent people the authors know. In 1976's Inferno, about half the people the main character meets are famous people, and in 1991's Fallen Angels, nearly everybody who assists the effort to return the "angels" (astronauts) to orbit is either a well-known fan (Jenny Trout = filksinger, author, and political activist Leslie Fish), a friend of Niven & Pournelle (Dan Forrester = Dan Alderson), or somebody who paid (through donation to a fan charity) for the privilege of appearing in the book. In this case, the first and second categories are not true tuckerizations, since the individual's real names are not used (however recognizable many of them may be).

A similar effect is seen in Niven's collaboration with David Gerrold, The Flying Sorcerers (1971); all the gods are well known science fiction or media personalities (Ouells = H. G. Wells, Rotn'bair = Star Trek creator Gene Roddenberry, etc.).

Tim Sullivan tuckerized his friend Gardner Dozois in the phrase "the garden world of Doazwah," in his novel Destiny's End (1988). Michael Swanwick features an appearance by Linda Deck, Director of the Bradbury Science Museum at Los Alamos National Laboratory, in his 2002 novel Bones of the Earth.

Many science fiction and military novelists see their names borrowed in the Axis of Time trilogy (2004-2006) by John Birmingham, and the Lachlan Fox thriller series (2006- ) by James Clancy Phelan.

The British science fiction writer Simon R. Green repeatedly tuckerizes Ansible editor David Langford by killing him off in various grisly ways and then gleefully notifying Ansible about the latest killing. Similarly, the science fiction fan Joe Buckley, who maintains a website dedicated to detailing information about the publications of Baen Books, has been tuckerized in books by a number of Baen authors, including Eric Flint and David Weber, dying a variety of unpleasant deaths. Weber has also tuckerized various other fans and authors, including Flint, Timothy Zahn, and Jordin Kare, even crewing one small spacecraft with a collection of hearts-playing Chattanooga-based science fiction fans. Science fiction scholar Fiona Kelleghan has been tuckerized (sometimes in comically unpleasant ways) by authors whom she wrote about: in Corrupting Dr. Nice by John Kessel, in Galveston by Sean Stewart, in Run by Douglas E. Winter, twice in the WWW Trilogy by Robert J. Sawyer (once as a character under her maiden name, "Feehan", and once as her real-world self), and in Spondulix by Paul Di Filippo.

=== In other media ===
One notable example of tuckerization outside the world of science fiction is the 1997 film Good Will Hunting. The female lead of the film is named Skylar in honor of the co-writer and star Matt Damon's college girlfriend, Skylar Satenstein (who later married the Metallica drummer Lars Ulrich).

Matt Groening named the members of the Simpson family (apart from Bart) after his parents and sisters. Elsewhere in the world of animation, South Park creators Trey Parker and Matt Stone named Randy and Sharon Marsh and Gerald and Sheila Broflovski after their parents, and Liane Cartman after Parker’s ex-fiancée Lianne Adamo. Parker had also used the name "Liane" for Alferd Packer’s unfaithful horse in his student film Cannibal! The Musical.

Some science fiction authors auction off tuckerizations at science fiction conventions with the proceeds going to charity. At one of these, Ken Follett gave his surname to the head of the Discworld Assassins' Guild in Night Watch (2002) by Terry Pratchett.
