= Without Warning (Birmingham novel) =

2008 novel by John Birmingham

- Author: John Birmingham
- Language: English
- Series: Disappearance Series
- Genre: Alternate history, Techno-thriller novel
- Publisher: Pan MacMillan
- Publication date: September 2008
- Publication place: Australia
- Media type: Print (Hardcover)
- ISBN: 978-0-345-50289-6
- Followed by: After America

Without Warning is an alternate history novel written by the Australian author John Birmingham. It was released in Australia in September 2008 and in the United States and the United Kingdom in February 2009. It is the first book in a new stand-alone universe. The novels After America and Angels of Vengeance continue the story.

== Plot ==
On the eve of the Iraq War, March 14, 2003, the majority of the population of the contiguous United States (along with the bulk of the populations of Canada, Mexico, and Cuba) disappears as the result of a large energy field that later comes to be known as "The Wave". Without Warning deals with the international consequences of the disappearance of the world's last superpower on the eve of war.

== Development ==
Birmingham said he was inspired to write the novel after hearing someone during a student demonstration at the University of Queensland say the world would be a better place if the United States disappeared.

=== References to other works ===
Without Warning contains a large number of references to popular culture. Birmingham, the author, said that he did this as a nod to American novelist Stephen King:

When I was a kid and started reading big, fat books, the thing that struck me about his novels, so different to the dull, dull things they made us read at school, was they were full of real world references.

== Reception ==
=== Literary significance ===
Jim Hopper of the San Diego Union-Tribune said Without Warning is an example of "'mainstream' genres (thrillers particularly) [that] incorporate some SFnal elements pretty often as greater or lesser plot element."
