= Emergence (Birmingham novel) =

2015 action sci-fi novel by John Birmingham

- First edition
- Author: John Birmingham
- Language: English
- Series: Dave vs. the Monsters Series
- Genre: Science fiction, Monsters
- Publisher: Pan MacMillan
- Publication date: April 2015
- Publication place: Australia
- Media type: Print (Paperback)
- Pages: 416
- ISBN: 978-0345539878
- Followed by: Resistance

Emergence is a 2015 novel by Australian author John Birmingham. It is the first in a trilogy of "action sci-fi" books featuring Dave Hooper. Hooper is an offshore oil rig worker who leads a fight against subterranean monsters who have emerged from his oil rig; he has somehow acquired the strengths of one of the monsters.
