= He Died with a Felafel in His Hand =

1994 book by John Birmingham

- Author: John Birmingham
- Language: English
- Genre: Comedy, auto-Biographical novel
- Publisher: Duffy & Snellgrove
- Publication date: 1994
- Publication place: Australia
- Media type: Print (hardcover and paperback)
- ISBN: 1-875989-21-8
- OCLC: 221745424
- Followed by: The Tasmanian Babes Fiasco

He Died with a Felafel in His Hand is a purportedly non-fiction autobiographical novel by Australian author John Birmingham about his experiences as a share housing tenant, first published in 1994 by The Yellow Press (ISBN 1-875989-21-8). The story consists of a collection of colourful anecdotes about living in share houses in Brisbane and other cities in Australia with variously dubious housemates. The title refers to a deceased heroin addict found in one such house. The book was subsequently adapted into the longest running stage play in Australian history and, in 2001, was made into a film by Richard Lowenstein, starring Noah Taylor, Emily Hamilton and Sophie Lee. A sequel, The Tasmanian Babes Fiasco, was published in 1998.

In 2004, to celebrate the book's tenth anniversary, Birmingham approached comic artist Ryan Vella to produce a graphic novel of the book. The pair met in April of that year at Artspace Mackay, for the opening of the Headspace exhibition. The comic was published in September 2004 by Duffy & Snellgrove (ISBN 1-876631-95-3). Paul Dawson calls this a grunge lit book.

== Synopsis ==
While the book is not written in a linear fashion, the order of houses (and housemates) John lives in is as follows:

1st Place – The Boulevade

- Tom lives in the garage
- Mel lives upstairs. Her boyfriend Warren moves in some time later. When they move out, replaced by
- Andy the med student (nicknamed "Dr Death")

Tom moves out and is replaced by:

- Derek the bank clerk

2nd Place

- Tom and John got a new place
- Derek the bank clerk (lived in a tent). Replaced by
- Martin the paranoid wargames enthusiast. He lasts three weeks and is replaced by
- Taylor the taxi driver

3rd Place – King Street

- PJ
- Milo
- PJ moves out, replaced by
- The 7 foot nurse, replaced by
- Ray, replaced by
- Malcolm and his Charlie Brown-themed bowls, replaced by
- Victor the Rastafarian, replaced by
- McGann the American, in his mid 40s, with a fondness for prostitutes, replaced by
- Taylor the taxi driver.

Taylor is having personal problems. He ambushes his fellow housemates with a toy gun after hiding for an hour. He tells them if it had been a real gun they would all be dead. John sees that as a good reason to move out.

4th Place – Duke Street (Brisbane)

- "Thunderbird Ron"
- Macgyver the mushroom farmer
- Neal the albino moontanner
- Howie (Neal's friend)
- Satomi Tiger (via Tim the invisible flatmate)
- "Brainthrust" Leonard
- Jabba the Hutt
- Mick the English backpacker
- Colin and Stepan

John moves out for reasons not made clear.

5th Place – Melbourne

- Stacey the Who Weekly fan

John moves out when her loud sex sessions become too much to bear.

6th Place – Fitzroy

- Brain the electrician
- Greg the gay school teacher
- AJ
- Satvia who starts going out with John
- Nigel moves into the house and moves in with Satvia

As a result of the fallout from this new relationship, Greg moves out and John follows suit.

7th Place – Carlton

- Ernie
- Martin the Canadian PhD student
- Dave the smoker moves in with his washerwoman girlfriend
- Four other Daves move in

After trying to freeze out the Daves from the house by cutting off the gas and electricity, John gives in and moves to a loft in Fitzroy.

8th Place – Fitzroy

- Wendell the Londoner

After Wendell's threats to kill him, John moves out and sleeps around at friends' places.

9th Place – Auchenflower in Brisbane

- Wayne the Satanic vet
- Danny (the decoy)
- Margot

10th Place – Brisbane goth house (not clear how this move came about)

- Kevin the carpenter
- Slovenian art printer
- Bald goth who lives in the back
- Luke the musician

All the goths run away after the bailiff comes round to collect unpaid rent. John keeps the house on and in moves:

- Dirk
- Em the banker (at the start of the book it is stated that Emma moves in when Nina moves out)
- "Crazy Nina"

Nina moves out to live with her friend Tanya

- Tanya then moves in after Nina sleeps with her boyfriend. The whole house moves:

11th Place

- Dirk
- Em the banker
- Tanya (possibly)
- New woman moves in to replace Nina but leaves because she is "diagnosed as schizo"
- Taylor the taxi driver moves in

The book then segues to

12th Place – band house in Darlinghurst, Sydney

- Hooper
- Tammy
- Jeremy moves in to escape his former psychotic housemate
- Keith the drummer moves in downstairs

13th Place – Kippax street

- Gina
- Harry the doctor, replaced by
- Kim the vet, replaced by
- "Melissa the junkie" (aka Rowan Corcoran), replaced by
- Duffy the computer programmer, replaced by
- The Dutch guy who lasted two weeks, replaced by
- Giovanna who lasted less than a week, replaced by
- Mosman who no one ever saw, replaced by
- Jimbo who moved in with one of the girls leaving his room free for
- Veronica the proto hippy who was replaced by
- Jonathan, replaced by
- "Downstairs Ivan"
- "Uptight Martin" moves in at the same time

Downstairs Ivan and Uptight Martin move out within three days of each other and are replaced by

- Paul the quiet journalist and
- Homer the air traffic controller
- Yoko San moves in and lasts three weeks, replaced by
- Jeffrey the "junkie" (drug addict)

Birmingham's narrative is interspersed with humorous testimonials from other veterans of the Australian share house lifestyle, and descriptions of common share house paraphernalia, such as the bucket bong, the ubiquitous "brown couch", and milk crates serving as makeshift furniture.

== Public Performances ==
In the late 1990s and early 2000s, a group performed a close stage version of the book at the Dorcas Hotel in Melbourne, which was known as a comedy venue at the time. Actors would sometimes change roles between different performances.

== Reception ==
In Review called it part of "Brisbane’s Holy Trinity of Gen X Lit... a knockabout comedy, but with serious bits that people always forget are in there, and was required reading for anyone who lived in a share house or who just wanted to read a funny book."
