= Designated Targets =

2005 novel by John Birmingham

- First edition
- Author: John Birmingham
- Cover artist: Bland Design
- Language: English
- Series: Axis of Time
- Genre: Alternate history, Science fiction novel
- Publisher: Pan Macmillan
- Publication date: September 2005
- Publication place: Australia
- Media type: Print (Hardcover, Paperback)
- Pages: 384
- ISBN: 0-345-45714-5
- OCLC: 60671858
- Dewey Decimal: 813/.6 22
- LC Class: PR9619.3.B5136 D47 2005
- Preceded by: Weapons of Choice
- Followed by: Final Impact

Designated Targets is a science fiction novel by Australian writer John Birmingham, the second volume of his alternate history Axis of Time trilogy.

== Plot summary ==
The novel starts in September 1942, four months after the Transition. A cease-fire has been signed between Adolf Hitler and Joseph Stalin, and the dictators have re-established their June 1941 borders. Both nations are 'cooperating' in various areas of research (particularly rocketry) at the newly built Demidenko research facility in Ukraine. Thanks to the foreknowledge granted by the Transition, Hitler and Stalin have purged their military and party ranks of traitors (real and imagined) that have been revealed from our history but not without problems. The arrest of Field Marshal Rommel sparks off a mutiny of the Afrika Korps and it throws the entire North African front into chaos.

Most of the German war machine shifts to "Operation Sea Dragon": the invasion of Britain. Meanwhile, in the Pacific, the Japanese have conquered New Guinea and the nearby island chains and are battling Allied forces (reinforced with troops from the Multinational Force) along the Brisbane Line in Australia.

In the United States a "Special Administrative Zone" has been carved out within the San Fernando Valley of California. Within "the Zone", the laws of the United States as of 15 January 2021 apply and it becomes an enclave for the 21st Century personnel. Many of the Multinational Force members work in various technological areas and thousands of contemporary females and non-whites are clamoring to join their ranks.

Over the next month, the Japanese position in northern Australia unravels after a massive blitzkrieg of 21st Century ordinance is unleashed. Japanese soldiers massacre entire towns, prompting both outrage and a reluctance to divert 21st forces anywhere else. Under interrogation, General Homma reveals that Australia was nothing more than a diversion to make the Multinational Forces expend as much of their limited weaponry as possible. Japanese survivors are executed under Multinational Force Sanction Four.

The French stealth ship Dessaix, presumed lost, was found by the Germans off the Canary Islands a few weeks after the initial Transition, and it now spearheads the assault on Yamamoto's real target: Hawaii. The ship's cruise missiles lay waste to the islands' defenses (and one nearly obliterates the city of Honolulu) although a French crew member manages to sabotage several of them before being killed. With the American defense crippled, the Japanese easily take Oahu and send a message to Washington, D.C., stating that any attempt to retake the islands will result in the wholesale slaughter of the population.

In Britain, preparations are underway for a commando raid on Norway against the heavy water plant there (a la Heroes of Telemark). However, information from Wehrmacht Colonel Paul Brasch (whose physically disabled son is eligible for 'disposal' under the T4 program) reveals that Germany's true nuclear effort lies elsewhere, and the mission is placed on hold. Operation Sea Dragon commences the next day with an attempt to invade across the English Channel.

Hundreds of aircraft and warships, upgraded with new technology, duel in the waters and skies south of England; the 21st century ship HMS Trident, more valuable as a command-and-control centre than as a weapon, ensures that key German formations identified by Brasch are destroyed. Three missiles taken off the Dessaix are launched at British targets, but suspected sabotage causes two to crash harmlessly into the North Sea. The third does hit Biggin Hill airfield, but its primary warhead does not detonate. Despite heavy losses sustained by the RAF and the damage to Biggin Hill, the Germans lose most of their navy. Any airborne units that reach England are quickly isolated and crushed by the Allies.

In the United States, a series of German-instigated bombings and race riots takes place, targeting civilians for maximum effect. Wahabi and Baathist insurgents foment revolt across the Middle East and the Soviet Union, with enough time to train and equip its armies, has begun seizing the Afghan passes leading to India.

Unbeknownst to either the Allies or Axis, HMS Vanguard materialized on the Siberian ice pack, one day before the other ships, and is now providing the Soviets with invaluable resources and information. Stalin has also impounded the ships of Convoy PQ 17 and has his own atomic bomb program in place; it may take a decade of fighting, but Stalin sees nothing but global triumph for communism.

As the German forces retreat from the Channel, a group of SS commandos led by Otto Skorzeny attempts to assassinate Prime Minister Churchill (as in The Eagle Has Landed). They are thwarted by SAS Major Windsor, but Skorzeny escapes in the melee.

Drone coverage over Oahu reveals that the Japanese are slaughtering military prisoners in droves. With the supercarrier Hillary Clinton all but useless in a fight, the 21st-century Japanese cruiser Shiranui (crewed by survivors of the Leyte Gulf) prepares to lead the Allied forces in what will be a very bloody retaking of the Hawaiian Islands.

== Historical characters featured ==
=== British Commonwealth ===
- Vera Atkins, British agent
- Thomas Blamey, Commander-in-Chief, Australian Army; Commander-in-Chief Allied Land Forces, South-West Pacific Area
- Winston Churchill, British Prime Minister
- John Curtin, Australian Prime Minister
- Bernard Freyberg, General, New Zealand Army
- Edward Wood, 1st Earl of Halifax, British ambassador to the US
- Bernard Montgomery, General, commander of British defences
- Philip Mountbatten, Sub-Lieutenant, Royal Navy
- Kim Philby, Soviet agent in hiding; aids Skorzeny's commandos.
- Archibald Wavell, General, commander of British defences

=== Germany ===
- Wilhelm Canaris, Head of Intelligence (purged)
- Hermann Göring, Chief of the Luftwaffe
- Heinrich Himmler, SS Chief
- Adolf Hitler, Reich Chancellor
- Ernst Kaltenbrunner, SS Security Service chief
- Albert Kesselring, General, Sea Dragon invasion forces
- Erwin Rommel, General of the Afrika Korps (purged)
- Otto Skorzeny, legendary Waffen-SS commando
- Albert Speer, Head of Armaments
- Claus von Stauffenberg, 20 July conspirator (purged)
- Erwin von Witzleben, 20 July conspirator (purged)

=== Japan ===
- Masaharu Homma, General in Australia
- Chuichi Nagumo, Admiral in Southwest Pacific
- Hiroshi Ōshima, General and ambassador to Germany
- Isoroku Yamamoto, Grand Admiral of the Combined Fleet

=== United States ===
- Henry Arnold, General, United States Army. Commander of Army Air Force Division.
- Dwight D. Eisenhower, General, United States Army. Commander of United States forces, European Theater of Operations.
- Leslie Groves, General, United States Army. Director of the Manhattan Project.
- J. Edgar Hoover, Director, Federal Bureau of Investigation.
- John Fitzgerald Kennedy, Lieutenant, United States Navy. Commanding Officer, PT-101.
- William Halsey, Admiral, United States Navy. Based at Pearl Harbor, Hawaii (executed by the Japanese)
- Ernest King, Commander-in-Chief, United States Navy. Chief of Naval Operations.
- Douglas MacArthur, General, United States Army. Commander of Allied Forces, Australian Theater of Operations.
- George Marshall, General, United States Army. Chairman of the Joint Chiefs of Staff.
- Joseph McCarthy, 'future' United States Senator (killed in combat)
- Marilyn Monroe, 'future' actress.
- Chester Nimitz, Admiral, United States Navy. Commander, U.S. Pacific Fleet.
- Elvis Presley, 'future' rock star.
- Franklin Delano Roosevelt, President of the United States.
- Raymond Spruance, Admiral, United States Navy.
- Henry Stimson, Secretary of War.
- Frank Sinatra, 'future' singer and actor

=== USSR ===
- Lavrenty Beria, Head of NKVD
- Nikita Khrushchev, prisoner (purged)
- Georgy Malenkov, CPSU member
- Vyacheslav Molotov, Foreign Minister
- Joseph Stalin, General Secretary of the CPSU
- Georgy Zhukov, General, Red Army

== Critical reception ==
Reviewing the novel for The Age newspaper Jeff Glorfeld was, at first, worried that this second volume in Birmingham's trilogy might have a lot to live up to. However he noted "World War 2.2 succeeds wonderfully." He later concluded: "As a difficult middle child, this clearly is a place-setter for book three. There's action aplenty but for the most part the tension builds to explosive levels without much release. Nevertheless, Birmingham's status as a leading action-adventure novelist continues to grow."

The Publishers Weekly review called this novel a "worthy sequel to Weapons of Choice (2004)." The review also found that "The author doesn't make the mistake of pitting his protagonists against morons, and he rightly shows how improvements in command and control trump bigger and better guns. Entertaining cameos by Elvis, Marilyn Monroe and John F. Kennedy will delight the geek in all of us."
