= After America (Birmingham book) =

2010 novel by John Birmingham

- Author: John Birmingham
- Language: English
- Genre: Alternate history, techno-thriller
- Publisher: Pan MacMillan
- Publication date: July 2010
- Publication place: Australia
- Media type: Print
- ISBN: 978-1-4050-3941-3
- Preceded by: Without Warning
- Followed by: Angels of Vengeance

After America is an alternate history novel by Australian novelist John Birmingham and released in Australia in July 2010. It was released in the United States on 17 August 2010.

It is the middle book of a three-part series, being preceded by Without Warning in 2007 and followed up by Angels of Vengeance in 2012. The overall group is known as the Without Warning trilogy and is the author's second such multi-part work.

== Plot ==
In 2007, four years post-"Wave," James Kipper, a former Seattle Council member, becomes president as the U.S. government relocates to Seattle, revealing 15-20 million survivors. His chief of staff, Jed Culver, travels to New York City, where debris is cleared amid fires and flooding. The military combats criminals, while salvage crew members encounter Kipper. In Texas, after a mass killing, farmland is given to immigrants; Miguel Pieraro's family faces violence from road agents, prompting a move to Kansas City. Caitlin Monroe and Bret Melton, married with an infant daughter, run a farm in Wiltshire, with Monroe as an Echelon adviser.

Yusuf Mohammed, a Ugandan teen recruited by the Lord's Resistance Army, joins fighters to launch rockets at Castle Clinton. An Apache attack kills his comrades, leaving him the sole survivor. He escapes after witnessing jihadist fighters shoot down a Black Hawk near Milosz. Milosz and their team secure Ellis Island and capture some fighters, while U.S. Navy SEALs and Sandline mercenaries take away prisoners, as the National Intelligence Agency replaces the CIA. Jules and Rhino process paperwork for a Seattle client interested in California oil deposits to secure support for Jules' ownership. Yusuf reaches Pier 86, discovers the damaged USS Intrepid, and sneaks ashore with intel in Russian and Serbian Mafia territory.

Kipper refuses to evacuate a wounded staff member. In Texas, Pieraro and Sofia seek vengeance on road agents. In England, Caitlin kills assassins attacking Bret Melton and Monique, sparing Richardson. Caitlin travels to London with Echelon agent Dalby to interrogate Richardson about the assassination attempts. Meanwhile, in New York, Jules and Rhino escape their hotel after an attack by irregular fighters. Kipper learns they cannot evacuate to JFK Airport due to a battle between U.S. Air Force Security Forces and irregulars, as Special Forces and 1st Cavalry Division troops clear the area.

Lieutenant Colonel Kinninmore briefs Kipper on captured low-level pirates admitting to an Emir's plan involving Muslim fighters capturing New York City. The Emir's bribery tactic extended to gangs, with the Russian and Serbian Mafia refusing. Weapons from Pakistan and Yemen were found. Kipper, flown out by Marine One, learns of Blackstone and the Pieraro family troubles, prompting action. Caitlin and Dalby head to Salisbury Plain, where Richardson confesses being hired by al-Banna to harm Caitlin. Caitlin prepares to travel to Germany as al-Banna's mother resides there.

Miguel Pieraro and Sofia meet Mormons Willem D’Age and Cooper Aronson, who left their group to bring cattle to Kansas City. Pieraro shares his family tragedy; Aronson's group was kidnapped by road agents. Seeking vengeance, Pieraro teams up with them. Kipper discusses troop needs with General Tommy Franks. Culver notes that neutron bombs were destroyed and chemical weapons disarmed in the ’90s. Russia conducted nuclear strikes in 2003, and the 2005 India-Pakistan war caused millions of deaths, with Israeli nuclear casualties over 600 million. Lieutenant Colonel Kinninmore assigns Air Force Combat Controllers for air strikes as Rangers engage in NYC. Pieraro plans a night attack in Texas, while Caitlin heads to London and Kipper strategizes for New York. Yusuf impresses the Emir and joins the harem. A firefight leads to Veal's death; the team regroups in Central Park with help from Jules and Rhino.

In Texas, Pieraro and the Mormons attack a bar, killing most road agents, rescuing Mormon women, and executing survivors. Pieraro discovers his daughter used a sniper rifle during the attack to protect him, leading to a bonding moment. Kipper visits the North Kansas City Hospital, pins Purple Hearts on wounded personnel, and writes letters for the deceased due to his guilt over sending soldiers to their deaths. In Palestine, Texas, Pieraro documents burned settlements where road agents killed civilians, while the Mormons perform last rites and bury the dead.

Kipper gets a troop request from Franks; Pieraro and Mormons settle in Texas, recalling the Wave. Roberto, now a dictator, threatens Blackstone, straining his relations with the government. Yusuf attacks Americans but retreats after acknowledging defeat. Caitlin flies from Berlin to NY to capture al-Banna, warning Kipper of her intent to avenge her family's past. Jules and Rhino face a cartel ambush in NYC while stealing documents for Caitlin, who saves them, leading to the discovery of incriminating papers on al-Banna and Cesky.

Milosz, Wilson, and Gardener defeat Yusuf's forces, including Yusuf, using steel buckets and Claymore mines. The 82nd Airborne Division confirms with Lieutenant Cleaver and prepares for an air strike on Rockefeller Center. Kinninmore informs Kipper of irregulars on Manhattan’s bridges, leading to orders for their destruction. Irregulars, identified by Wilson, Milosz, and Gardener, gather at Rockefeller Center while Kinninmore assists 1/7 Cav in avoiding the kill zone. A flash flood in Texas impacts the Pieraro group. B-52s target Rockefeller Center as ground forces retreat, with incendiary bombs causing hundreds of casualties and forcing mafiosos to surrender. Caitlin, Rhino, and Jules are airlifted from Central Park.

Pieraro and Sofia survive but find many of their friends dead. Recovering from the flash flood, they realize they've crossed into Oklahoma, safe from Texas road agents. They move towards Kansas City for a peaceful new life.
