= The Flying Sorcerers =

1971 novel by David Gerrold and Larry Niven

- Cover of first edition (paperback)
- Author: Larry Niven & David Gerrold
- Language: English
- Genre: Science fiction
- Publisher: Ballantine Books
- Publication date: 1971
- Publication place: United States
- Media type: Print (paperback)
- Pages: 316 pp
- ISBN: 0-345-02331-5

The Flying Sorcerers is a humorous 1971 science fiction novel by American writers David Gerrold and Larry Niven. It was originally serialized in 1970 as The Misspelled Magishun in If magazine.

The book is about the efforts of a stranded astronaut to escape from a primitive world, showing how sufficiently advanced technology could be perceived as magic by its natives.

== Plot summary ==
The plot concerns the efforts of an astronaut and geologist/anthropologist, known to the natives as "Purple", to escape from a primitive world on which he is stranded and return to his people. The events are seen from the perspective of Lant, one of the natives, who becomes Speaker (chieftain) of his people over the course of the novel.

The natives, a fur covered people, believe in magic and the book shows how sufficiently advanced technology would be perceived by a primitive society.

Purple lands in an egg-shaped vehicle. He casually disrupts the lives of Lant's people and thoughtlessly demeans Shoogar, the village magician. Shoogar gets revenge by destroying Purple's vehicle, which results in an atomic explosion. Many of the villagers are dead or injured: the rest, including Lant and Shoogar, are forced to flee. Purple is presumed dead.

The villagers eventually wind up on a fertile peninsula, which, as the summer approaches, is rapidly becoming an island (thanks to the influence of the two suns, the shorelines on this world are somewhat variable). To the annoyance of the existing inhabitants of the area, the villagers contrive to be trapped in the verdant area by the rising seas. The villagers are less happy when they learn that Purple is here, serving ineffectively as local magician, having succeeded the incumbent, Dorthi, by killing him by landing on him in a fall from the sky in an impact suit.

Lant's people wish to flee, but have nowhere to go. Lant, who becomes Speaker of the villagers more or less by default, and the local Speaker persuade the two magicians to swear to a peace treaty.

Purple can call his mother ship to get him, but must return to the distant area of the old village to do so. Everyone is stranded on the island for a considerable length of time. Purple conceives the idea of fabricating a flying machine to return him to the area. He persuades his villagers (who are actually anxious to get rid of him) and Lant's, to join in the scheme.

The ship will have balloons, sails, and pedal-driven steering. Purple labors in trying to create this work, beyond the technology of the local people. He creates 'aircloth' (a thin, airtight cloth), a rubber-equivalent, splits water into hydrogen and oxygen, and is eventually successful in building the ship.

In doing so, however, he has changed the lives of the villagers forever. Alongside the benefits of new technology, he has brought problems such as crime, substance abuse, and environmental damage, while also altering relations between the sexes and introducing money into their culture.

Purple, Shoogar, Lant, and Lant's adult two sons take off for the old village. They get there, and Purple is able to summon the mother ship and depart. There is a brief epilogue—after the return home, Lant notes that a new flying machine, much larger than the first, is to be built, thus continuing the industrial revolution started by Purple.

== Reception ==
Lester del Rey gave the novel a mixed review, finding the comedy of the novel's first segment incongruous with the more seriously played finish, concluding "It's not at all a bad book—but it isn't all a good one."

James Nicoll has described it as "dreadful tosh", and noted its "astoundingly horrible treatment of women".

== Names ==
Most of the names in the book are jokes primarily dealing with the Science Fiction universe. This is known as Tuckerization. David Langford says "Some sort of record for over-the-top Tuckerization was set by David Gerrold and Larry Niven in their very silly novel The Flying Sorcerers (1971)."

=== Suns ===
- Virn - The red-giant sun - Jules Verne.
- Ouells - The bluish white-dwarf sun - H.G. Wells.

=== Gods ===
- Blok god of violence - Robert Bloch, author of Psycho.
- Brad god of the past - Ray Bradbury, for his butterfly effect short story "A Sound of Thunder".
- Caff god of dragons - Anne McCaffrey, known for her Dragonriders of Pern series.
- Eccar the Man - Forrest J. Ackerman, "the man who served the gods so well that he was made a god himself" - a reference to Ackerman's vast involvement with science fiction fandom.
- Elcin god of thunder and lightning - Harlan Ellison, known for a stormy personality, and short stature (the god is described as "tiny").
- Filfo-mar god of rivers - Philip José Farmer, known for his Riverworld series.
- Fineline god of engineers - Robert A. Heinlein, who was an aeronautical engineer.
- Fol god of distortion - Frederik Pohl; a teasing allusion to his extensive work as an editor.
- Furman god of "fasf" - Edward L. Ferman, longtime editor of The Magazine of Fantasy and Science Fiction (often abbreviated as "F&SF").
- Hitch god of birds - Alfred Hitchcock, directed The Birds.
- Klarther god of the skies & seas - Arthur C. Clarke, who wrote many works dealing with space travel ("skies") and oceanic adventures ("seas")
- Kronk god of the future - Groff Conklin, who edited forty science fiction anthologies.
- Leeb god of magic - Fritz Leiber, for his sword-and-sorcery stories.
- Musk-Watz wind god - Sam Moskowitz, known for his loud voice and long speeches.
- Rotn'bair god of sheep - Gene Roddenberry, creator of Star Trek.
  - Lant mentions that Rotn'bair's sign is the horned box, i.e., a TV set with a rabbit-ears antenna on top.
- Nils'n god of mud creatures - Nielsen ratings, arch-enemy of Rotn'bair (Star Trek had poor ratings).
  - Lant explains that the sign of Nils'n is a diagonal slash with an empty circle on either side, i.e. "%".
- N'veen god of tides & map makers - Larry Niven wrote about tides in "Neutron Star" and maps in Ringworld.
- Pull'nissen god of duels - Poul Anderson, a founding member of the Society for Creative Anachronism; he was a Knight of the SCA, therefore skilled in one-on-one combat.
- Po god of decay - Edgar Allan Poe, for his morbid stories.
- Sp'nee ruler of slime - Norman Spinrad, for his controversial writing, and his giving of irritation and offense to many.
- Tis'turzhin god of love - Theodore Sturgeon, who wrote many stories about variations of love and sex.
- Tukker god of names - Wilson "Bob" Tucker, who playfully used names of friends as some of the character names in his fiction.
- Yake god of what-if - Ejler Jakobsson, the penultimate editor of If magazine.

=== Characters and other inhabitants ===
- Purple - The literal translation of "as a mauve" (in full, this is "as a color, shade of purple-grey") - Isaac Asimov.
- Wilville and Orbur - Bicycle makers who built the first flying machine - Wright brothers.
- Dorthi - A wizard killed by Purple falling on him from the sky - A reference to Dorothy from the Wizard of Oz.

=== Miscellaneous ===
- Cathawk - The first flying machine, recalling the Wright brothers' flight at Kitty Hawk.
- Smith's Son's Clearing - Where the Cathawk is on display - The Smithsonian Institution.
- filk-singer flute - Magical tool Shoogar's apprentices didn't pack - Science fiction fans do filk music singing.
