= List of Axis of Time characters =

John Birmingham's Axis of Time trilogy, a series of novels, features several major characters and many minor characters.

== Admiral Phillip Kolhammer USN ==
Born in 1969, Admiral Kolhammer served in the First Gulf War and is the Commander of UNPROFLEET. He is an American of German extraction and Jewish ethnicity. By the Transition Act of 1942, Admiral Kolhammer is the commandant of the "Special Administrative Zone".

== Brigadier Michael Barnes ==
Head of the Australian Contingent and Commanding Officer of the Second Cavalry, and the highest-ranked Army officer mentioned so far, Brigadier Barnes' billet was possibly the overall command of UNPROFLEET's Land Forces.

Brigadier Barnes was named after a long-time friend of Birmingham

== Captain Karen Halabi RN ==
Karen Halabi is the CO of HMS Trident, Deputy Commander of UNPROFLEET and Head of the British Contingent. She is the daughter of a Pakistani father and a British mother. She joined the navy to escape from her abusive father. She is a strong-minded and skilled commander. During the events of the books, her mixed heritage and female gender cause problems with several people in the British high command who see her as unfit to command; however she gains the support of Winston Churchill and the British royal family.

== General J. "Lonesome" Jones, USMC ==
CO of the 82nd Marine Expeditionary Brigade, Jones is a recipient of the Medal of Honor for rescuing the crew of an incapacitated M1A2 Abrams tank. He was married to a Frenchwoman who worked for Médecins Sans Frontières named Monique Danton. Her brother was a seaman assigned to the Robert Dessaix, and after it joined the German side, there was a backlash against Jones.

== Captain Mike Judge USN ==
Executive Officer and later Captain of the USS Hillary Clinton, the Texan's next assignment is to take over production of fighter planes in The Zone. After the Clinton's refit, Captain Judge was once again her Captain as she sailed into harm's way. During the interval between Designated Targets and Final Impact, Judge married the British Captain Karen Halabi.

== Captain Jane Willet RAN ==
Captain Willet is the commander of HMAS Havoc, the only submarine to come through with the fleet. She is known to have had a younger sister who was executed by Islamic Extremists in Indonesia whilst doing relief work.

== Prince Henry ==
Colonel Prince Henry Charles Albert David "Harry" Windsor is an officer of the British 22 SAS Regiment and also is third in line to the throne, behind his older brother, King William V and William's two unnamed children (presumably Prince George and Princess Charlotte). After returning to the regiment "at the reduced rank of Captain", Prince Harry is billeted to HMAS Havoc, where he is captured by the Transition. He has the least bumpy switch of the Multinational Taskforce, due to being a royal. Additionally, he was placed on the Civil List as soon as his identity comes to light. He used that money to fund a tab at the local pub near his Regimental HQ for his officers and men who could run there and back under a certain time.

== Other characters ==
=== 21st Century Personnel ===
==== Multinational Force ====
- Major Margorie Francois USMC - United States Marine Corps
- Captain Colin Steele USN — Captain, JDS Siranui
- Colonel Michael Toohey — Australian 2nd Cavalry Regiment
- Lt Colonel Nancy Viviani USMC — Production Chief to Admiral Kolhammer
- Captain Maria O'Brien USMC, retired
- Lt Commander James McTeale RN — Executive Officer HMS Trident
- Lieutenant Willy Liao USN — Yeoman to Admiral Kolhammer
- Sergeant-Major Vivian St Clair — Regimental Sergeant-Major 22nd Regiment, British Army
- Sergeant-Major Aubrey Harrison — Sergeant Major, 82nd MEU
- Chief Petty Officer Vincente Rogas — US Navy SEALs
- Chief Petty Officer Roy Flemming RAN — CPO HMAS Havoc
- Admiral Tony Kevin - Commander-in-Chief, United States Pacific Command
- Sub-Lieutenant Phillipe Danton - Ranking Officer on Robert Dessaix
- Lt Commander Conrad Gray RAN - Executive Officer, HMAS Havoc
- Major Pavel Ivanov - Russian Federation Spetsnaz. On secondment to US Navy SEALS
- Lieutenant Amanda Lohrey RAN - Intelligence Officer, HMAS Havoc

==== Civilians ====
- Julia Duffy - Feature Writer, The New York Times embedded with the 82nd MEU
- Rosanna Natoli - CNN Producer

=== Contemporary Personnel ===
==== Allied Powers ====
- General Henry Arnold US Army- Commander, US Army Air Corps
- Winston Churchill - British Prime Minister
- John Curtin - Australian Prime Minister
- Brigadier General US Army Dwight Eisenhower - Commander-in-Chief, US Forces in the European Theater
- Admiral Ernest King USN - Chief of Naval Operations
- General Douglas MacArthur US Army - Supreme Allied Commander, Southwest Pacific Area
- General George Marshall US Army - Chairman, Joint Chiefs of Staff
- Admiral Chester Nimitz USN - Commander-in-Chief US Pacific Command, Commander-in-Chief, US Pacific Fleet
- President Franklin Roosevelt - 32nd President of the United States
- Rear Admiral Ray Spruance USN - Commander, Combined Pacific Task Force
- Rear Admiral Sir Leslie Murray RN - Royal Navy Liaison to the US Pacific Fleet
- General Leslie Groves - Director, Manhattan Project
- Lieutenant John F Kennedy USN - Commander, PT101
- Leading Seaman Michael 'Moose' Molloy - PT101
- Sub-Lieutenant Philip Mountbatten RN - HMS Javelin
- Lieutenant Jens Poulsson - Norwegian Commando
- Commander Daniel Black USN (Contemporary) — Chiefs of Staff Liaison to Admiral Kolhammer
- Chief Petty Officer Dave Rollins USN - CPO, PT101
- Lieutenant George Ross USN - Commander, PT 59
- Sergeant Arthur Snider USMC - 1st Marine Division
- Squadron Leader Jan Zumbach RAF - 303 Squadron
- Henry Stimson - Secretary of War
- Lieutenant Wally Curtis USN - Training Publications Officer, Liaison Division, Us Navy

==== The Axis ====
- Reichsmarschall Hermann Göring - Commander, Luftwaffe
- Reichsführer SS Heinrich Himmler - Commander, SS, Later Führer of the Third Reich
- Reichschancellor Adolf Hitler
- Albert Speer - German Minister of Armaments
- Standartenführer Otto Skorzeny — Personal Bodyguard to Adolf Hitler
- General Kurt Zeitzler - Wehrmacht Chief of Staff
- Major-General Paul Brasch - Deputy Minister, Reichministery of Armaments
- Commander Jisaku Hidaka IJN - Interim Military Governor of Hawaii
- General Masaharu Homma - Commander, Japanese Land Forces in Australia
- General Hiroshi Oskima - Japanese Ambassador to Germany
- Lieutenant Masahisa Uemura - Commander, Special Attack Squadron, Sapporo
- Grand Admiral Isoroku Yamamoto IJN - Commander, Japanese Combined Fleet

==== Union of Soviet Socialist Republics ====
- Lavrenty Pavlovich Beria - Director, NKVD
- Nikita Sergeyevich Khrushchev - Prisoner
- Joseph Stalin - General Secretary of the Communist Party of the Soviet Union
- Vyacheslav Molotov - Foreign Minister

==== Civilians ====
- Graeme Blundell - Chief of Staff, New York Times
- Detective Sergeant Lou 'Buster' Cherry - Homicide Squad, Honolulu PD
- Dr Michael Cooper MD - Doctor in Bundaberg, Queensland
- James 'Slim Jim' Davidson - CEO and Principal Shareholder, Slim Jim Enterprises. Formerly, Able Seaman, USS Astoria
- Colonel William Joseph Donovan - Director, Office of Strategic Services
- Lord Halifax - British Ambassador to the United States
- J Edgar Hoover - Director, Federal Bureau of Investigation
- Special Agent Dave Hurly - Federal Bureau of Investigation
- Paul Robertson - Principal Private Secretary to John Curtin
- William Stephenson - Winston Churchill's personal representative in the United States
- Mitch Taverner - Office of Strategic Services
- Clyde Toland - Assistant Director, Federal Bureau of Investigation
