= Pyramid (Australian game show) =

- Genre: Game show
- Presented by: Shura Taft
- Country of origin: Australia
- Original language: English
- No. of seasons: 7
- No. of episodes: 450

Production
- Production locations: Brisbane, Queensland (2009); Sydney, New South Wales (2010–2014)
- Running time: 30 minutes (including commercials)
- Production companies: 2waytraffic; Sony Pictures Television; Ambience Entertainment

Original release
- Network: Nine Network (2009–2012); GO! (2013–2014)
- Release: 1 September 2009 – 2014

Pyramid is an Australian children's quiz show screening on the Nine Network from 2009 to 2015 hosted by Shura Taft. It is co-produced by Sony Pictures Television (the owner of the franchise) and produced by Sydney-based Ambience Entertainment (a production arm of Omnilab Media). It began broadcasting on 1 September 2009 and is filmed in front of a live studio audience. It involves two teams competing in games of "vocal charades". The show is based on the 1979 United States game show The Junior Partner Pyramid, a children's variant of the Sony Pictures Television Pyramid franchise.

== Gameplay ==
Like the original 1979 US Junior format and unlike the original 1979 US Junior Partner format, contestants are not paired with their parents to guess seven words within 30 seconds, but with a celebrity instead (similar to the standard game with adults), plus there are two kids instead of just one and only have 30 seconds to guess six answers (as was the case with the 2002-04 Donny Osmond version; the Clark, Cullen, Davidson, Richards, and Strahan versions have seven answers). Each team consists of two contestants, who take turns guessing the words/phrases or giving out clues with a celebrity.

Pyramid features a pyramid-shaped game board made up of six wide-screen televisions which reveal words and categories to the players. One player describes words from the category, while a teammate must guess six answers within a 30-second time limit. Players rotate to complete three rounds of six categories, and the team with the most points goes to the Winner's Circle for their chance to win prizes. Similar to the Super Six (Osmond) or Big 7 (Clark) versions, one of the six categories contains a prize. For the team to win this prize, they must guess all six words or phrases within 30 seconds.

For every correct guess, five points are awarded to the team. Should the team get all six clues within thirty seconds, the team scores one point for every second remaining on the clock.

In round 1, the celebrities give out the clues and the contestants guess the word or phrase. The second round is played like the first round, except the celebrities switch teams. In the third and final round, the contestants provide the clues and the celebrities guess. The trailing team has the advantage of choosing which celebrity they want as their guesser. Also, that team gets first pick on the board.

After three rounds, if the final scores are tied, the host will read out a set of clues and the first contestant to buzz in and give the correct answer will go to the final round. Should that contestant pass or give an incorrect answer, their opposition will go to the final round instead.

In the bonus round, only the contestants play the game (no celebrities involved). In the first series, the round was played to the classic Pyramid format, with the answers being collective items (similar to the bonus rounds in the US version) e.g. "Things that are round". In the second series, the answers were similar to the ones played in the earlier rounds.

Celebrity guests are placed into each team. The first celebrities to appear included Paulini Curuenavuli, Emily Seebohm, Lara Davenport, Ky Hurst, James Horwill, Heidi Valkenburg, Jessica Napier, Blair McDonough and Charli Delaney.

== Production ==
The series is produced by Sony Pictures Television and Ambience Entertainment for the Nine Network. It is filmed in front of a live studio audience in Sydney. Series one premiered on 1 September 2009 after it was delayed by repeats of The Shak. Series two first aired on 3 May 2010.
