= The Shak =

Australian children's TV program (2006-2010)

- Starring: Drew Jarvis; Beau Walker; Kendal Nagorcka; Jacqueline Duncan; Libby Campbell
- Country of origin: Australia
- Original language: English
- No. of seasons: 9
- No. of episodes: 590

Production
- Running time: 30 Minutes (including commercials)

Original release
- Network: Nine Network
- Release: 27 March 2006 – 20 April 2010

The Shak (also known as The Shak at Home for its final two series) is an Australian children's television program that aired on the Nine Network from 2006 to 2010. Its four hosts, Curio (Drew Jarvis), Nitro (Beau Walker), Picasso (Kendal Nagorcka) and Eco (Jacqueline Duncan) answered viewer questions, queries, dares and challenges in an entertaining and educational manner. Each host's name relates to their personality and the type of stories they present. Viewers sent questions and suggestions to the presenters via the shows website.

For its final two series, the show was revamped to include intersecting storylines, featuring its hosts living in a house together and including recurring guest actors. Willow (Libby Campbell) joined the cast for the ninth and final series.

== Cast ==
- Drew Jarvis as Curio: an expert in science, books and movies
- Beau Walker as Nitro: a daredevil who is interested in sports and surfing
- Kendal Nagorcka as Picasso (series 1–8): interested in art, fashion and pop culture
- Jacqueline Duncan as Eco (series 1–7): a nature and animal enthusiast
- Libby Campbell as Willow (series 9): a pop culture fanatic who loves animals

== Production ==
The series was filmed, for the main part, at a studio resembling a large shed or shack, hence the name "Shak", it decorated with all manner of objects. The characters arrived via a prop of a wave, and exited through a door on the other side of the shack. They were known as 'Shaksters', as were the viewers. Other filming was done at various attractions and locations on the Gold Coast where the Shak was set, with Dreamworld being a regular filming spot.

In 2006, the filming was done at Sea World but in early 2007, filming was moved to the WhiteWater World theme park. This was explained via an explosion made by Curio, which resulted in the Shaksters moving. and the opening titles were fully animated however in 2007 it was changed to a mix of live action and animation.

The show was revamped in 2009 for its eighth series, which had Curio, Nitro and Picasso living in a share house. Picasso later left the show; a search for a Shakster competition was launched in which they cast Libby Campbell as Willow. On 13 January 2010, the Nine Network cancelled the show, claiming that it was an "economic decision".

== Series overview ==
Series	Episodes	Originally released	
Series	Episodes	First released	Last released
1	65	27 March 2006	17 July 2006
2	65	18 July 2006	30 October 2006
3	65	31 October 2006	13 April 2007
4	70	16 April 2007	13 September 2007
5	65	14 September 2007	28 March 2008
6	65	31 March 2008	16 July 2008
7	65	7 August 2008	2008
8	65	20 April 2009	17 July 2009
9	65	31 August 2009	20 April 2010

== Episodes ==
=== Series 1: 2006 ===
No. in series	Title	Original release date
1	TBA	27 March 2006
65	TBA	17 July 2006

=== Series 2: 2006 ===
No. in series	Title	Original release date
1	TBA	18 July 2006
65	TBA	30 October 2006

=== Series 3: 2006–2007 ===
No. in series	Title	Original release date
1	TBA	31 October 2006
65	TBA	13 April 2007

=== Series 4: 2007 ===
No. in series	Title	Original release date
1	TBA	16 April 2007
70	TBA	13 September 2007

=== Series 5: 2007–2008 ===
No. in series	Title	Original release date
1	TBA	14 September 2007
65	TBA	28 March 2008

=== Series 6: 2008 ===
No. in series	Title	Original release date
1	TBA	31 March 2008
65	TBA	16 July 2008

=== Series 7: 2008 ===
No. in series	Title	Original release date
1	TBA	7 August 2008
65	TBA	2008

=== Series 8: 2009 ===
No. in series	Title	Original release date
1	"Moving In"	20 April 2009
Curio, Picasso and Nitro move into a sharehouse
2	"Best Mates/ Flat Mates"	21 April 2009
The group are celebrating their new arrangements
3	"The Girl Next Door"	22 April 2009
Curio And Picasso meet their new neighbour
4	"Bad Habits"	23 April 2009
Curio, Picasso and Nitro learn their bad habits
5	"Lost And Found"	24 April 2009
Nitro loses his keys
6	"Love"	27 April 2009
Nitro admits to Curio he likes Penny
7	"The Intruder"	28 April 2009
There's a creature in the house
8	"The Call Back"	29 April 2009
Picasso's waiting for a call back and won't let Curio or Nitro use the phone.
9	"Laundry Day"	30 April 2009
Nitro runs out of clean clothes and borrows Curio's
10	"Blown The Budget"	3 May 2009
Curio, Picasso and Nitro waste their food budget
11	"Cooking Roster"	4 May 2009
Curio keeps cooking disgusting tasting food, so Picasso and Nitro make a plan to tell him without hurting his feelings.
12	"The Sock Monster"	5 May 2009
One of the house mates has been stealing socks, shampoo and milk
13	"Be Yourself"	6 May 2009
Curio tries to be cool like Nitro in order to fit in
14	"The Video Game"	7 May 2009
Curio, Picasso and Nitro become obsessed with a video game
15	"Sick Day"	8 May 2009
Nitro has a cold, which forces Curio and Picasso to watch over him
16	"The Monopoly Match"	11 May 2009
Curio, Picasso and Nitro play a game of Monopoly
17	"The Secret"	12 May 2009
Piccaso has been hiding from Curio and Nitro
18	"Big Trouble"	13 May 2009
Someone's in trouble
19	"Alpha Female"	14 May 2009
Curio and Nitro are trying to determine who is the man of the house
20	"Rules of Borrowing"	15 May 2009
Curio and Nitro break Picasso's movie and decide to remake it.
21	"Fright Night"	18 May 2009
Curio, Picasso and Nitro take part in a scary movie marathon
22	"The Couch Hog"	19 May 2009
Curio becomes lazy and sits on the couch all day
23	"Leave A Message"	20 May 2009
The group each receives phone messages for each other, however forget to tell anyone
24	"The Distraction"	21 May 2009
Curio's trying to finish his screenplay in time, however keeps getting distracted.
25	"The Inspection"	22 May 2009
Curio's Aunties inspect the house
26	"Shak to the Future"	25 May 2009
Curio and Nitro travel to the future to rescue Picasso
27	"Its Tradition"	26 May 2009
On Christmas day, the group all learn they have different traditions.
28	"The Pet"	27 May 2009
Picasso gets a pet without telling the other house mates.
29	"Left Out"	28 May 2009
Nitro has been spending more time with Penny than Curio.
30	"Another Secret"	29 May 2009
Curio's has been keeping a secret from Nitro and Picasso.
31	"Games Night"	1 June 2009
Nitro invites Penny to a game night.
32	"Lice/Itchy And Scratchy"	2 June 2009
Picasso has lice.
33	"Got Mail"	3 June 2009
Picasso has been getting gifts from a secret person.
34	"The Musician"	4 June 2009
Curios tries to discover his hobby, trying nut numerous activities.
35	"The Jinx"	5 June 2009
Curios been jinxed by an old lady who living down the street.
36	"Curio's Blankie"	8 June 2009
Picasso tries to wash Curio's blankie, much to his dismay.
37	"The Thunderstorm"	9 June 2009
A storm is coming, which causes the group peril.
38	"The Megastar"	10 June 2009
Miley Cyrus stays at the house without Curio And Nitro knowing.
39	"Insominia"	11 June 2009
Nitro can't sleep and is disturbing Curio and Picasso.
40	"Dreamworld Special Superheroes"	12 June 2009
The group turns into their superhero alter-egos.
41	"The Stage Mum"	15 June 2009
Curio and Nitro support Picasso too much with acting.
42	"Dreamworld The Lie"	16 June 2009
Nitro tells a lie to an old high school buddy that he is rich.
43	"The Stand Ins"	17 June 2009
Curio And Nitro get a job as extras in Picasso's television series 'Cop This'
44	"Forget Me Not"	18 June 2009
Curio has temporary memory loss and Nitro And Picasso try to help him remember his life.
45	"Picassos The Man"	19 June 2009
Picasso Auditions for a show for the parts of two characters, one a Male.
46	"Haunted House"	22 June 2009
The group thinks the house is haunted.
47	"Picassos Boyfriend"	23 June 2009
Picasso introduces her boyfriend to the boys.
48	"The Pimple"	24 June 2009
Nitro has a pimple on the day he organised a date with Penny.
49	"The Meadows"	25 June 2009
Picasso's friend Whitney stars in a new reality show and becomes famous.
50	"Curios Birthday"	26 June 2009
Picasso And Nitro invite an old friend of Curios to the shak while they're out.
51	"Helping Out"	29 June 2009
The group helps out.
52	"Good Luck Pants"	30 June 2009
Nitro thinks his pants are lucky
53	"The Job"	1 July 2009
Curio and Picasso wonder where Nitro is, when he's not at Penny's and not surfing.
54	"The Decision"	2 July 2009
After the boys make Picasso angry and Whitney offers Picasso to live with her.
55	"The Shoot"	3 July 2009
Curio has finished his script.
56	"The I in Team"	7 July 2009
The Group produces a commercial to enter in a competition.
57	"The Phone Bill"	8 July 2009
Nitro runs up the phone bill talking to Penny.
58	"Stressing Out"	9 July 2009
Picasso learns that the New York Academy of Performing Arts is enrolling and Nitro is having his school formal reunion.
59	"The Pressure"	10 July 2009
Nitro and Picasso pressure Curio to join a Gym.
60	"Locked In"	13 July 2009
After the ladder falls the group is stuck upstairs.
61	"The Whisper"	14 July 2009
Penny is stuck in a love triangle with Curio and Nitro.
62	"The Break Up"	15 July 2009
Penny breaks up with Nitro.
63	"The Feud"	16 July 2009
Nitro is angry at Curio because Penny likes Curio instead of him.
64	"Love Again"	17 July 2009
Curio goes out with Whitney.
65	"The Goodbye"	17 July 2009
Picasso is leaving the share-house to attend the New York Academy of Performing Arts, however before she leaves, she does all the things she ever wanted to do.

=== Series 9: 2009–2010 ===
No. in series	Title	Original release date
1	"Twos Not Enough"	31 August 2009
After Picasso leaves the shak, Curio and Nitro look for a new house mate.
2	"How Nitro Got His Groove Back"	7 September 2009
After Nitro loses his job at "Taco Party Town" Nitro tries to regain his confidence.
3	"My Girlfriends Back"	14 September 2009
Curio's old girlfriend is back and still believes that their relationship is still on.
4	"The Lovely Ugly"	21 September 2009
Willow's addition to the house is freaking Curio and Nitro out.
5	"The Sleepwalker Texas Ranger"	28 September 2009
Someone has been sleepwalking and trashing the house.
6	"The Witch"	5 October 2009
The group assumes their neighbour's a witch, however they find out differently.
7	"Pants Again"	12 October 2009
Curio uses the Good Luck Pants to win a jousting competition.
8	"Super Juice"	19 October 2009
Willow becomes addicted to super juice to help her get energized.
9	"Willow in Wonderland"	26 October 2009
Willow enters a door into a different version of the shak.
10	"The Idol"	2 November 2009
Curio wins a dinner with the new "Party Town Taco" Mascot, however he's not what he seems.
11	"Nitros Bully"	9 November 2009
Nitro's old bully from school is coming to visit Nitro.
12	"Penny For Your Thoughts"	16 November 2009
Willow invites Penny to games night.
13	"My first Real Friend"	12 December 2009
Willow has an imaginary friend.
14	"Who Done It"	19 December 2009
When a house warming gift is broken, the house has become a who done it scene.
15	"Willows New BFF"	21 December 2009
Willow's tired of her old girlfriends and tries to find new ones, however Curio and Nitro have other plans.
16	"Worlds Best Couple"	22 December 2009
Curio and Willow pretend to be the world's best couple to win a new television set.
17	"Auntie for a Day"	23 December 2009
The group has to look after Aunt Agnes for a day.
18	"Back to School"	24 December 2009
Nitro goes to school to learn about business after his Best friend starts a clothing label.
19	"Static Psychic"	15 February 2010
Nitro Gets zapped by lightning and thinks he is a psychic.
20	"Blast From The Past"	16 February 2010
When a rat is in the house the group calls wildlife rascals, however the worker looks familiar to Curio.
21	"The Job Interview"	17 February 2010
Curio and Nitro have an interview for their dream job.
22	"One of the Boys"	18 February 2010
Willow thinks that she will never have a boyfriend.
23	"Not Another Secret"	22 February 2010
Nitro has a new hobby.
24	"I'd Give It A 7"	23 February 2010
Curio thinks honesty is the best policy and starts telling it like it is.
25	"Pet Sitters"	24 February 2010
The group takes care of a pet without knowing the full responsibilities.
26	"Small Good Things"	25 February 2010
Willow believes that "Big things come in small packages" however she is discouraged when she struggles with being small.
27	"I Dream of Penny"	26 February 2010
When Curio has a dream about Penny does he discover feelings for her.
28	"The Sales Pitch"	27 February 2010
Nitro tries out his business skills.
29	"Beauty and the Beast"	1 March 2010
Willow is worried when her friend comes over because she turned her face green somehow.
30	"I Spy"	2 March 2010
The company Curio works for sends a robot double of Curio.
31	"Don't Call Us Prue Call You"	3 March 2010
Curio submits a script to a publisher, however there are a few script changes that need to be made.
32	"Zombie Goat From Mars"	4 March 2010
Curio enters a story contest, however soon finds out he copied a famous author.
33	"Dear Gabby"	5 March 2010
When reading a columnist's article in the newspaper about a housemate that wants to move out, the group accuses each other of sending the letter, will someone leave?
34	"The Willow Most Likely"	8 March 2010
Willow is confused about her love life.
35	"Split Deciscion"	9 March 2010
Willow is split between who she likes.
36	"Gus Who's Back"	10 March 2010
Curio's friend Gus returns to the house.
37	"My Best Enemy"	11 March 2010
When Willow finds out Nitro's cheer leading coach was a mean person from high school, she invites her to dinner to hopefully get an apology, However are they both as bad as each other.
38	"The Negotiators"	12 March 2010
Nitro does not want the Guide Dog they were training to go, so he holds it in his room and barricades the door.
39	"I'm with the Band"	15 March 2010
Willow tries to get the sax and the axe back together, however Nitro and Curio don't want to.
40	"The Visitor"	16 March 2010
Willow's uncle from the circus comes to stay, however he won't go, so the group hatch a plan to make him leave.
41	"Circus Substitute"	17 March 2010
Willow's family asks her to fill in at the circus and Curio and Nitro try to help.
42	"Suit You"	18 March 2010
After the group takes a one-day job working at a convention, they find themselves stuck in their costumes.
43	"Try-Athlon"	19 March 2010
Curio and Willow are training for a triathlon because Nitro's two team mates are injured.
44	"Choose Your Own Adventure"	22 March 2010
After the group stay up all night playing a game, they all realize they are late for something.
45	"You Can't Handle The Tooth"	23 March 2010
When Curio still believes in the tooth fairy, Nitro and Willow go out of their way to make sure the tooth fairy comes.
46	"I Love It So Much I Could Lie"	24 March 2010
Willow pretends to be in-ties with famous singers to impress a record executive.
47	"Ring Ring Annoying Thing"	25 March 2010
Curio and Willow love Nitro's new phone ringtone Until his phone keeps ringing.
48	"CuL8R Will-O"	26 March 2010
Nitro and Curio ask Willow to update their Facebook page, however she soon gets addicted to the social-networking site.
49	"Man Up, Man"	29 March 2010
Nitro loves Romantic-Comedies, however he keeps it secret from Curio and Willow.
50	"Three Housemates and a Baby"	30 March 2010
The group have to babysit a plastic baby for their neighbour.
51	"Picture Perfect"	31 March 2010
Willow has a zit and doesn't want to take her photo for a fan website.
52	"Thank You Mr Carnegie"	1 April 2010
Everyone is sick of Curio talking about science fiction, so Curio tries to change his personality.
53	"What's Yours Is Mind"	2 April 2010
In a freak storm Curio, Nitro and Willow swap Minds.
54	"The Shed"	5 April 2010
When people move in the street, the group finds out their just like them called The Shedsters with their own television series.
55	"Project Runaway"	6 April 2010
Nitro shows off his new designs at a fashion show
56	"Cyber Bully"	7 April 2010
Curio is getting bullied online so Nitro helps him.
57	"Criss Cross"	8 April 2010
Everyone is keeping secrets about whom they have feelings for.
58	"Inside Voices"	9 April 2010
The group are keeping secrets from each other, however things become clear when they start talking to each other.
59	"Valentines Day"	12 April 2010
Its time for the group to confess their feelings for each other.
60	"My BFFS BF And GF"	13 April 2010
Curio feels lonely now Nitro's with someone and Willow's with Someone.
61	"Despicable Plea"	14 April 2010
When Curio's boss tries to take over the world it's up to the Shaksters to stop him.
62	"Surprise Surprise"	15 April 2010
Aunt Agnes new boyfriend is a big surprise to the Shaksters, after he tries to convince Aunt Agnes to sell the sharehouse.
63	"The Penny Issue"	16 April 2010
Nitro and Willow make Curio face the Penny Issue
64	"Eviction Part 1"	19 April 2010
After Karl Stimpson marries Aunt Agnes, she gives him her share of the Shaksters house and Karl decides to evict the Shaksters so his plan for revenge is complete, and move in with Aunt Agnes. The episode ends with Nitro, Willow and Curio walking out of the house with their belongings.
65	"Eviction Part 2"	20 April 2010
After the Shaksters have raised the money to buy the other half of the share house through an online show, Curio decides he wants to leave the share house to pursue his writing career, however before he leaves Barney Stimpson Zaps him with a time machine ray and sends him in to the past. The episode ends with Nitro and Willow talking to each other in the loft, instead of Curio

== Controversy ==
On 26 May 2010, The Shak was announced as having breached the children's television standards for endorsing a product by 'The Australian Communications and Media Authority'. The claim was made when Kendal, Drew and Beau were seen riding scooters with close up scenes during a prize segment. On the entertainment news site 'TV Tonight' comments on the story were mostly negative and damming to the ACMA.
