= Emily Hamilton =

British actress (born 1971)

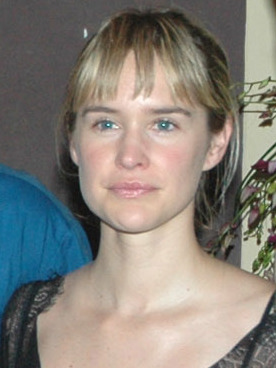
- Hamilton at IFFI, 2006
- Born: Emily Miranda Beevers; 24 May 1971 (age 55); Hammersmith, London, England
- Education: Oxford University
- Occupation: Actress
- Years active: 1994–2010
- Spouse: Tristan Gemmill (m. 2001)
- Children: 3

Emily Miranda Hamilton (née Beevers; born 24 May 1971) is a British former actress.

== Early life ==
Daughter of actor Vincent Ball, of Chittaway Point, New South Wales, Australia, Hamilton was born in Hammersmith, London, and grew up with her mother in Ealing, West London, where she attended Notting Hill & Ealing High School GDST. While at school, she appeared in a regular photo story for the teen magazine My Guy. She was originally planning to study at St Andrew's University, but after achieving better-than-expected A-Level results, she took a year out and re-applied to Wadham College, University of Oxford, where she graduated, studying English Literature.

== Career ==
Hamilton's notable roles include:

- Eva ... Betty; 2010
- CASUAL+Y ... Julie Chester in "Love is a Battlefield" (#24.25); 2010, BBC One
- Perfect Life ... Vera; 2010
- The Queen ... Princess Diana; 2009
- Filth: The Mary Whitehouse Story ... Miss Tate; 2008 BBC Two
- The Bill ... Dr. Julia Bickham:
  - "Reaching Out" (#25.50); 20 August 2009, ITV1
  - "Psychiatric Help" (#25.49); 13 August 2009, ITV1
  - "Line of Fire: Part 2" (#23.78); 24 October 2007, ITV1
  - "Line of Fire: Part 1" (#23.77); 18 October 2007, ITV1
- Midsomer Murders ... Leonie Charteris in "They Seek Him Here"; 27 April 2008, ITV1
- The Memsahib ... Grace; 2006
- CASUAL+Y @ HOLBY CI+Y ... Sarah Wincott in "Interactive: Something We Can Do" (#1.1); 2005, BBC One
- Making Waves ... Lt. Cdr. Jenny Howard; 2004
- Always and Everyone ... Dr. Saskia Walker
  - "Against the State" (#4.4); 2002, ITV Granada
  - "Out of Time" (#4.3); 2002, ITV Granada
  - "The Protege" (#4.2); 2002, ITV Granada
  - "A New Breed" (#4.1); 2002, ITV Granada
- As If ... Rachel in "Sasha's POV" (#3.1); 2002, E4
- He Died with a Felafel in His Hand ... Sam; 2001
- David Copperfield ... Agnes Wickfield; 2000
- City Central ... Lucy Barnard
  - "Someone to Watch Over Me" (#2.10); 1999, BBC One
  - "Northern Soul" (#2.8); 1999, BBC One
  - "Second Time Around"; (#2.4); 1999, BBC One
  - "Life and Death" (#1.10); 1998, BBC One
  - "Picking Up the Pieces" (#1.8); 1998, BBC One
  - "A Night on the Town" (#1.7); 1998, BBC One
  - "Nothing Like a Dame" (#1.6); 1998, BBC One
  - "A Quiet Evening In" (#1.5); 1998, BBC One
  - "Throwing It All Away" (#1.4); 1998, BBC One
  - "Justice to Be Done" (#1.3); 1998, BBC One
  - "Pressure" (#1.2) 1998, BBC One
  - "Parallel Lines" (#1.1) 1998, BBC One
- Silent Witness ... Louise Thomas
  - "An Academic Exercise: Part 2" (#3.2); 1998, BBC One
  - "An Academic Exercise: Part 1" (#3.1); 1998, BBC One
- The Grand ... Christina Lloyd-Price; 1998
- The Ruby Ring ... Lucy; 1997
- Holding On ... Tina; 1997
- Catherine Cookson's The Girl ... Margaret Thornton; 1996
- The Ruth Rendell Mysteries' ... Sophie Riding; 1996
- September… Alexa Aird
- Haunted ... Mary; 1995
- The Buccaneers ... Lady Georgina; 1995
- Wycliffe ... Jean Lander; 1994

== Personal life ==
Hamilton and actor Tristan Gemmill married in September 2001. He is best known for playing Adam Trueman in BBC One's long-running medical drama series CASUAL+Y. The couple have a son and two daughters together.
