= John Birmingham =

British-born Australian author (born 1964)

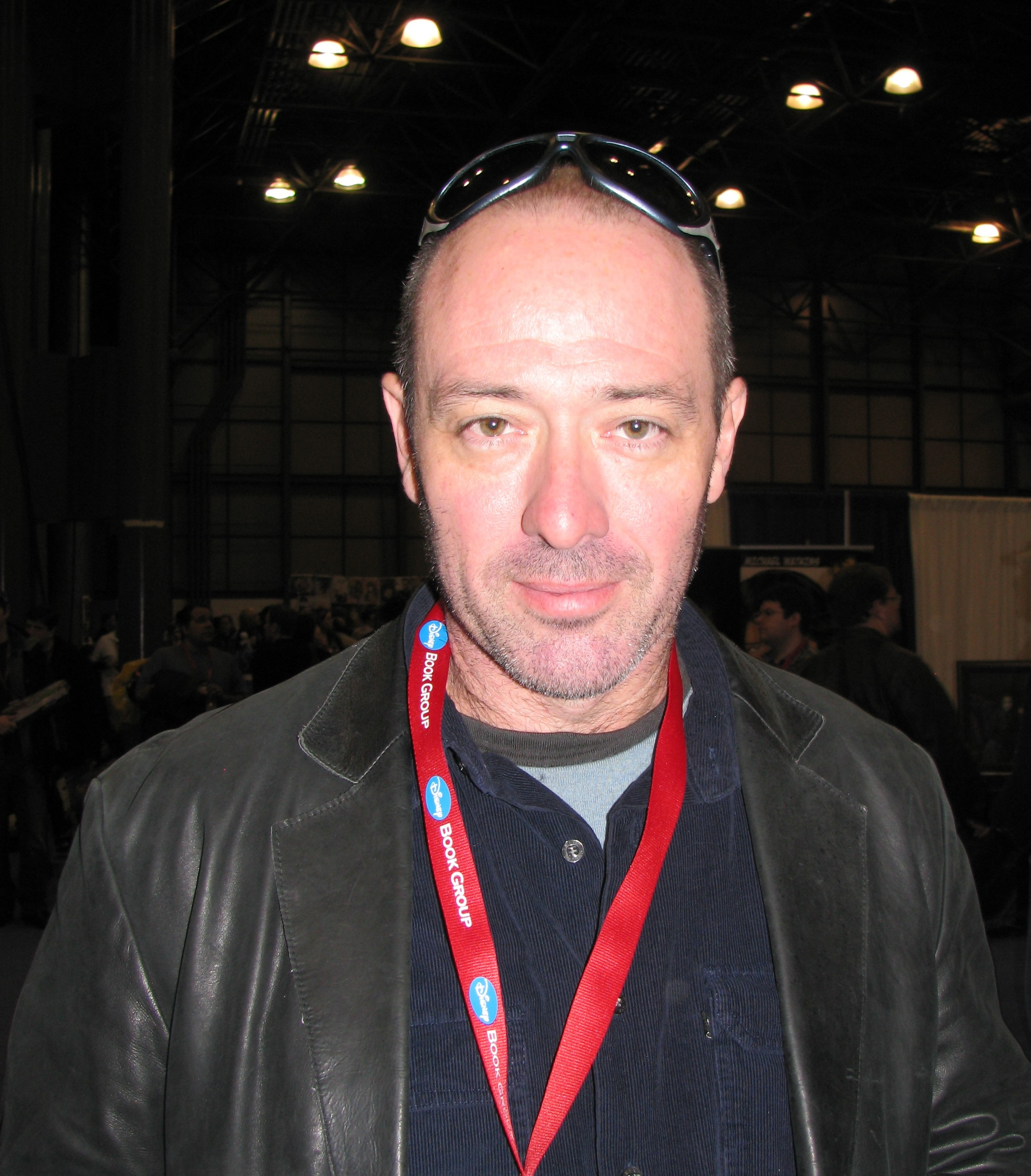
- Birmingham at the Javits Exhibition Center in February 2009, attending the New York Comic Con.
- Born: 7 August 1964 (age 62); Liverpool, United Kingdom
- Education: University of Queensland
- Occupations: Writer, author
- Writing career
- Years active: 1994–present
- Genres: Non-fiction, military science fiction, alternate history, urban fantasy
- Website: www.cheeseburgergothic.com

John Birmingham (born 7 August 1964) is a British-born Australian author, known for the 1994 memoir He Died with a Felafel in His Hand, the Axis of Time trilogy, and the well-received space opera series, the Cruel Stars trilogy.

== Early life and education ==
Birmingham was born in Liverpool, United Kingdom, but grew up in Ipswich, Queensland, Australia, having moved to the country with his parents in 1970. Birmingham received his higher education at St Edmund's College in Ipswich and at the University of Queensland in Brisbane. Birmingham's only stint of full-time employment was as a researcher at the Australian Department of Defence but he has worked for the television program A Current Affair.

== Career ==
Birmingham returned to Queensland to study law but he did not complete his legal studies, choosing instead to pursue a career as an author. Birmingham has a degree in international relations and currently lives in Brisbane.

=== Writing ===
Birmingham was first published in Semper Floreat, the student newspaper at the University of Queensland in Brisbane, writing a series of stories featuring a fictional character named Commander Harrison Biscuit. His first paid published work appeared in a student magazine at the University of Queensland. He won a young writers award for the Independent, which was edited by Brian Toohey and wrote a number of articles for Rolling Stone Australia and Australian Penthouse magazines.

In 1994, Birmingham released his sharehouse living memoir He Died with a Felafel in His Hand, which has since been turned into a play, film, and a graphic novel. The sequel is The Tasmanian Babes Fiasco (1997), the theatrical version of which was written and produced by 36 unemployed actors. In 2011 it was the longest running stage play in Australian history. In 2014, three Brisbane filmmakers sought funds to make a film version via crowdfunding.

His other works include The Search for Savage Henry, a crime novel featuring the character Harrison Biscuit, How To Be a Man, a semi-humorous guide to contemporary Australian masculinity and Off One's Tits, a collection of essays and articles previously published elsewhere. He also spent four years researching the history of Sydney for Leviathan: the Unauthorised Biography of Sydney (Random House, 1999, ISBN 0-09-184203-4). It won Australia's National Prize for Non-Fiction in 2002. In 2010, the Sydney Theatre Company created a play based upon the non-fiction book Leviathan that focus on the dark side of the evolution of the city of Sydney.

He has also written two small pocket books The Felafel Guide to Getting Wasted (2002) and The Felafel Guide to Sex (2002) which feature advice Birmingham has received over the years regarding those two subjects. He also wrote the nonfiction book Dopeland : Taking the High Road Through Australia's Marijuana Culture (2003).

Birmingham has written two Quarterly Essays: "Appeasing Jakarta: Australia's Complicity in the East Timor Tragedy" and "A Time for War: Australia as a Military Power". He is also a regular contributor to The Monthly, an Australian national magazine of politics, society and the arts.

In September 2006, Birmingham wrote a piece in The Australian lambasting Germaine Greer for an article she had written in The Guardian about Steve Irwin shortly after his death. He described Greer's comments as "a poisonous discharge of bile". Portions of Birmingham's article were later quoted in the Parliament of New South Wales.

In 2015, Birmingham parted ways with the traditional tradebook publishing business by becoming his own publisher after his Australian publisher's decision to release his Dave Hooper series several months prior to the release of the same books in the much larger North American and European markets instead of the near simultaneous global release that was used for the release his previous works. The result of his Australian publisher's poor business decision resulted in dismal sales in those larger book markets caused by the demand being filled through pirated electronic editions due to lack of availability through normal channels such as Amazon and Barnes & Noble. Using the new publishing model, Birmingham has published three Stalin's Hammer novellas plus a new novel called A Girl in Time.

=== Axis of Time ===
In 2004 he published the alternate history Weapons of Choice, the first in the Axis of Time trilogy, a series of Tom Clancy-like techno-thrillers. Many writers from those genres appear as minor characters. It was published by Del Rey Books in the United States, and by Pan Macmillan in Australia.

The series tells of a multinational peacekeeping force from the early 21st century being taken back in time to 1942, where its presence completely changes the course of World War II. In August 2005, the second book, Designated Targets was published in Australia. Publication in the United States followed in October 2005.

The third and final full-length novel in the trilogy, Final Impact, was released in Australia in early August 2006, and was released in the United States in January 2007. The ABC reported in 2006 that there were two new Axis of Time books in the works, one set shortly after the end of the war, and another in the alternative 1980s, said to feature a dashing young RAF pilot: Richard Branson. One of these books was originally set to be released in Australia in 2008, but Birmingham instead wrote Without Warning.

In 2013 the series got a new lease on life with the novella Stalin's Hammer: Rome. This was followed in 2016 by Stalin's Hammer: Cairo and Paris. The three novela's were published in print as Stalin's Hammer: The Complete Sequence a year later. The storyline takes the reader to an alternate 1954, ten years after the ending of the first series.

In 2023, World War 3.1 saw the light of day. Continuing the story from Stalin's Hammer, it describes the start of the Warsaw Pact invasion of Western Europe. World War 3.2, the sequel to 3.1, describes how the West fought back. The book was release in September 2025.

=== Disappearance series ===
Without Warning, the first book in a new universe, was released in Australia in September 2008. The novel is a thought experiment, set on the eve of Operation Iraqi Freedom in March 2003. It deals with the disappearance of the bulk of the United States' population as the result of a large energy field that becomes known as "The Wave". Without Warning deals with the international consequences of the disappearance of the world's only super power on the eve of war. It was released in the United States on 3 February 2009. A second novel, titled After America, was released on 1 July 2010 in Australia and 17 August 2010 in the United States. The third book in the series, Angels of Vengeance, was released on 1 November 2011 in Australia and was released in April 2012 in the United States.

=== The Cruel Stars trilogy ===
A space opera series. The first book, The Cruel Stars, was published in 2019. The second, The Shattered Skies, was published in 2022. The third book in the trilogy, The Forever Dead, was originally scheduled for a 2024 publication, but it appears that its release has been delayed again.

== Literary significance and reception ==
Kirkus Reviews gave a very positive review for The Cruel Stars and called it "Frenetic action viewed in a black fun-house mirror" for its narrative that "canters along at a good clip, dashing off insane cannibals, exploding warships, detached heads, and cartwheeling body parts, with occasional transfusions of dark comic relief." The reviewer for FanFiAd was "kind of stuck for words at how much I enjoyed this one". The reviewer for Book Page wrote "A good space opera can be many things. It can be funny or deeply philosophical. It can be touching, and it can be gory. John Birmingham’s latest novel, The Cruel Stars, balances all of those things, making readers laugh out loud even as it pulls them through an intergalactic battle for the soul of humanity." The reviewer for At Boundary's Edge compared this work to Tom Clancy's Ryanverse.

A reviewer for Space.com wrote about The Shattered Skies calling the book "military sci-fi at its finest". Writing for FanFiAddict, its reviewer called The Cruel Stars series utterly fantastic and wrote "Birmingham really finds new ways to keep the plot fresh and explore different, strange scenarios despite the crew being on a ship in the void that is space." Another reviewer wrote that the book has "absorbing conflicts with high stakes and believable antagonists, complex characters with rich relationships and effective emotional depth, and Birmingham’s magnificent world building" while avoiding the flaws in the first book of the series.

== Awards ==
Designated Targets was a finalist for the 2005 Aurealis Award for Best Science Fiction Novel.

The Shattered Skies was nominated for a Dragon Award for the 2022 Best Military Science Fiction or Fantasy Novel.

== Works ==
=== Non-fiction ===
- He Died with a Felafel in His Hand (1994), ISBN 1-875989-21-8
- The Tasmanian Babes Fiasco (1998), ISBN 1-875989-29-3
- Leviathan: The Un-authorised Biography of Sydney (1999), ISBN 978-0091832612
- How to be a Man (co-authored with Dirk Flinthart) (2000), ISBN 978-1875989027
- Appeasing Jakarta: Australia's complicity in the East Timor Tragedy (2001), ISBN 978-1863953863
- Off One's Tits (collection of articles & essays) (2002), ISBN 978-1740511285
- Dopeland: Taking the High Road through Australia's Marijuana Culture (2003), ISBN 978-1740510301
- A Time for War: Australia as a Military Power (2005), ISBN 978-1863951340
- How to be a Writer: who smashes deadlines, crushes editors and lives in a solid gold hovercraft (2016), ISBN 978-1742234847
- Stranger Thingies: From Felafel to Now (2018), ISBN 978-1742235592
- On Father (2019), ISBN 978-0522873429

=== Fiction ===
==== Axis of Time series ====
- Weapons of Choice (2004), ISBN 0-7329-1199-0
- Designated Targets (2005), ISBN 0-345-45714-5
- Final Impact (2006), ISBN 0-345-45716-1
- Stalin's Hammer: Rome (2012), novella, ISBN 978-1743341391
- Stalin's Hammer: Cairo (2016), ebook only novella
- Stalin's Hammer: Paris (2016), ebook only novella
- Stalin's Hammer: The Complete Sequence (January 2017), ISBN 978-0648003625, all three novellas (Rome, Cairo and Paris) have been repackaged as a single volume
- World War 3.1: A Novel of the Axis of Time ( September 2023), ISBN 978-0648633112
- World War 3.2: The Axis of Time (September 2025), ISBN 978-0648633150
- World War 3.3: The Axis of Time (February 2026), ISBN TBD

==== The Disappearance series ====
- Without Warning (2008), ISBN 978-0345502896
- After America (2010), ISBN 978-1405039413
- Angels of Vengeance (2011), ISBN 978-0345502933

==== David Hooper trilogy ====
(Also known as Dave vs. The Monsters)

- Emergence (2015), ISBN 978-0345539878
- Resistance (2015), ISBN 978-0345539892
- Ascendance (2015), ISBN 978-0345539915
- The Protocol for Monsters (2016), ebook only novella
- Soul Full of Guns (2016), ebook only novella
- The Demons of Butte Crack County (2017) (Anthology)

==== A Girl in Time series ====
- A Girl in Time (2016), ISBN 978-0648003601
- The Golden Minute – A Girl in Time Novel (2018), ISBN 978-0648003618

==== End of Days series ====
- Zero Day Code (2019), ISBN 978-0648003670
- Fail State (2019), ISBN 978-0648003687
- American Kill Switch (2021), ISBN 978-0648633105

==== The Cruel Stars series ====
- Novels:
  - The Cruel Stars (August 2019), ISBN 978-1789545913
  - The Shattered Skies (January 2022) ISBN 978-1984820556 (US) ISBN 978-1789545944 (AU)
  - The Javan War (September 2024), with Jason Lambright, origin story for Lucinda Hardy, ISBN 979-8227723741.
  - The Forever Dead (October 2026), ISBN 978-1984820587
- Short stories:
  - Parade Rest (August 2022) – A free short story prequel written with Jason Lambright about Lucinda Hardy's experiences as a cadet at the Royal Armadalen Naval Academy.

==== Licensed to Love: The Agency Files ====
- The Girl Who Came In From The Cold (2025), ISBN 979-8285451112
- For Her Eyes Only (2025), ISBN 979-8285458951
- The Bjorn Identity (2025), (ISBN TBD)

==== Other novels ====
- Sleeper Agent (February 2024), ISBN 978-0648633129
- Sleeper Agent: Vengence (December 2024)
- Sleeper Agent: Nemesis (December 2025)

==== Short stories ====
- Fortune and Glory (2015), short story that was published in The Change: Tales of Downfall and Rebirth, ISBN 978-0451467577, an anthology in S. M. Stirling's Emberverse series
- The Finishers (November 2023), free short story
