= List of Beat Bugs episodes =

Beat Bugs is an animated children's television series, created by Josh Wakely, and produced for Netflix by Grace: A Storytelling Company and Thunderbird Entertainment. The series is centered around five young anthropomorphised insects who live in an overgrown suburban backyard and learn life lessons while having adventures. Wakely acquired worldwide rights from Sony/ATV Music Publishing to a catalogue of music by the Beatles to feature in the series. The program features versions of songs by the popular rock group, performed by contemporary recording artists and interwoven into the narrative.

== Series overview ==
Season	Episodes	Originally released
1	13	3 August 2016
2	13	18 November 2016
Special	1	21 November 2017
3	13	9 November 2018

== Episodes ==
=== Season 1 (2016) ===
No. overall	No. in season	Title	Directed by	Written by	Original release date
1a	1a	"Help"	Josh Wakely	Josh Wakely; Story by : Josh Wakely	25 July 2016 (7TWO); 3 August 2016 (Netflix)
After refusing help from his friends, a stubborn Jay launches himself across the backyard using Crick's latest catapult invention, landing in a large glass jam jar. Trapped, Jay calls for his friends, who search the village to find him. When he is freed, Jay learns the importance of accepting help. Inspired by the song "Help!"
1b	1b	"Lucy in the Sky with Diamonds"	Josh Wakely	John Armstrong	25 July 2016 (7TWO); 3 August 2016 (Netflix)
After Kumi tells Buzz a scary story, she has trouble sleeping, so the Beat Bugs take her to see a sleep doctor, Lucy the Dragonfly. Crick's grasp of science is opposed when Lucy cures Buzz of her nightmares by simply helping her find her imaginative safe place. Inspired by the song "Lucy in the Sky with Diamonds". Guest starring Pink.
2a	2a	"I Am the Walrus"	Josh Wakely	Josh Wakely	25 July 2016 (7TWO); 3 August 2016 (Netflix)
Walter tells Buzz the story of when he moved in with the Beat Bugs. He recalls how he made a fool of himself when he first approached the bugs, and how he remembered his Uncle Tusk's advice of believing in yourself and declaring your uniqueness. When he acted like himself, he had no trouble in making new friends. Inspired by the song "I Am the Walrus".
2b	2b	"I'm a Loser"	Josh Wakely	Brian Hartigan	25 July 2016 (7TWO); 3 August 2016 (Netflix)
Morgs the stick insect is tired of constantly being mistaken for a stick, and is worried that his old friend Katter, who is now a butterfly, will think he is a loser. The bugs help Morgs find his confidence, and in the end, he finds that Katter is impressed with the stick insect that he is. Inspired by the song "I'm a Loser". Guest starring James Corden.
3a	3a	"Come Together"	Josh Wakely	Michael Stokes	26 July 2016 (7TWO); 3 August 2016 (Netflix)
When Walter kicks the Beat Bugs out of his house for playing too carelessly, Crick has the idea of building a treehouse for the bugs to all come together to play in. The arguing friends are brought together over designing and building the treehouse as a group. Inspired by the song "Come Together".
3b	3b	"Rain"	Josh Wakely	Joshua Mapleston; Story by : Josh Wakely	26 July 2016 (7TWO); 3 August 2016 (Netflix)
After a three day downpour of rain of in the village, the bugs all come up with plans to change the weather. But when they can't stop the rain, Boris the frog shows the friends how enjoyable the miserable weather can really be. Inspired by the song "Rain". Guest starring Aloe Blacc.
4a	4a	"Good Day Sunshine"	Josh Wakely	Keith Thompson; Story by : Josh Wakely	26 July 2016 (7TWO); 3 August 2016 (Netflix)
The Beat Bugs struggle to stay warm through a prolonged winter, with Mr. Sun away on vacation and deciding to extend his stay. When the stored supply of sun-powered electricity runs out, Crick tries to invent a way to create more electricity, but is unsuccessful at first. The bugs create enough power to send a message to Mr Sun asking him to return, which he does. Inspired by the song "Good Day Sunshine". Guest starring Robbie Williams.
4b	4b	"Sun King"	Josh Wakely	Erica Harrison; Story by : Josh Wakely	26 July 2016 (7TWO); 3 August 2016 (Netflix)
The Beat Bugs discuss how they should use an ice cream wrapper which has been dropped in the backyard. Buzz is saddened when she cannot think of any ideas, and decides to go on a journey of self-discovery to find her special talent. After inadvertently helping out some bugs in the village, Buzz realizes she has the special talent of brightening others' days. Inspired by the song "Sun King".
5a	5a	"Penny Lane"	Josh Wakely	Kate Mulvany; Story by : Josh Wakely	27 July 2016 (7TWO); 3 August 2016 (Netflix)
Crick tells the viewer the story of how Penny Lane was built. In the story, Crick feels as if he is being ignored and unnoticed, so the Beat Bugs plan to create a place for him to feel free to express himself. Using pennies found in the backyard, the friends construct an auditorium called Penny Lane. Crick gains the confidence to speak out and decides that Penny Lane should be a place for all of the Beat Bugs to share. Inspired by the song "Penny Lane".
5b	5b	"Birthday"	Josh Wakely	Michelle Offen & Cleon Prineas; Story by : Josh Wakely	27 July 2016 (7TWO); 3 August 2016 (Netflix)
Kumi, Walter and Buzz plan a surprise party for Jay and Crick's birthday, and send the pair away while they prepare. Jay and Crick work as a team to find their way to back the party, which they suspect is being thrown for them. Inspired by the song "Birthday".
6a	6a	"I've Just Seen a Face"	Josh Wakely	Erica Harrison; Story by : Josh Wakely	27 July 2016 (7TWO); 3 August 2016 (Netflix)
Jay is fascinated to find out who lives in the Big House, so goes exploring. He is discovered by a human named Julia, whom he develops a strong sense of affection for after seeing her up-close. The Beat Bugs don't believe his story until they see the girl's face for themselves. Inspired by the song "I've Just Seen a Face".
6b	6b	"Magical Mystery Tour"	Josh Wakely	Cleon Prineas; Story by : Josh Wakely	27 July 2016 (7TWO); 3 August 2016 (Netflix)
A showman grasshopper named Jasper invites the Beat Bugs on a Magical Mystery Tour, which doesn't turn out as expected. The adventure proves to be a ride in a bug container of Julia's, which the young human takes to her class as a science project. She later returns the bugs to the backyard. Inspired by the song "Magical Mystery Tour". Guest starring Eddie Vedder.
7a	7a	"When I'm 64"	Josh Wakely	Josh Wakely	28 July 2016 (7TWO); 3 August 2016 (Netflix)
The Beat Bugs find an old alarm clock which they mistake for a time machine, Jay is eager to test it out and steps inside, before the clock is thrown around in the backyard. When he exits, Jay believes he has traveled to the future and is sixty-four years old, getting a glimpse at what his life might one day be like. Inspired by the song "When I'm Sixty-Four".
7b	7b	"Doctor Robert"	Josh Wakely	Josh Wakely	28 July 2016 (7TWO); 3 August 2016 (Netflix)
The Beat Bugs visit Dr. Robert for a check-up, without Buzz, who is too scared and refuses to go. After an encounter with the backyard cat in which she is sneezed on, Buzz is taken to Dr Robert and learns the importance of facing your fears and visiting doctors. Inspired by the song "Doctor Robert".
8a	8a	"Ticket to Ride"	Josh Wakely	Erica Harrison; Story by : Josh Wakely	29 July 2016 (7TWO); 3 August 2016 (Netflix)
The Beat Bugs use an old bicycle wheel to create a carnival ride in the style of a Ferris wheel. But when Kumi is the only one who keeps her ticket safe, she rides alone, and the others learn the importance of being responsible before having fun. The friends work together to find new tickets to join Kumi on the ride. Inspired by the song "Ticket to Ride".
8b	8b	"Getting Better"	Josh Wakely	Deborah Jarvis	29 July 2016 (7TWO); 3 August 2016 (Netflix)
When Dr. Robert goes on vacation, the Beat Bugs inadvertently start feeling under the weather. Tired of answering his friend's requests, Crick invents a robot doctor to look after them. The robot is at first successful, but malfunctions after the bugs take the invention for granted. Inspired by the song "Getting Better".
9a	9a	"Being for the Benefit of Mr Kite"	Josh Wakely	Cleon Prineas; Story by : Josh Wakely	1 August 2016 (7TWO); 3 August 2016 (Netflix)
Mr. Kite is detached from his string and crash lands into the backyard. Crick operates on his broken structure and the bugs throw a flying festival to help get him back in the air. The kite struggles to perform at first until he is reunited with his flying partner Julia. Inspired by the song "Being for the Benefit of Mr. Kite!"
9b	9b	"You've Got to Hide Your Love Away"	Josh Wakely	Katherine Thomson; Story by : Josh Wakely	1 August 2016 (7TWO); 3 August 2016 (Netflix)
At Kumi's birthday party, Walter goes overboard trying to help her win all of the games. Feeling his efforts have been unappreciated, he storms off and instead puts on a play at Penny Lane in the hope of finding new friends. The Beat Bugs come to watch, and let Walter know that he is loved. Inspired by the song "You've Got to Hide Your Love Away".
10a	10a	"Day Tripper"	Josh Wakely	Cleon Prineas; Story by : Josh Wakely	2 August 2016 (7TWO); 3 August 2016 (Netflix)
Connie the cicada has a list of things to do while she is above the ground, including visiting the Big House. Crick hurries to finish his latest invention to help take her there when he remembers cicadas can only spend one day above ground. While the invention doesn't succeed, Connie makes it to the house on her own. Inspired by the song "Day Tripper".
10b	10b	"In My Life"	Josh Wakely	Josh Wakely	2 August 2016 (7TWO); 3 August 2016 (Netflix)
At her birthday party, Katter the caterpillar doesn't appear to be enjoying herself. Feeling sad and tired, she decides to go and rest. Katter sleeps for two days before emerging from her chrysalis as a butterfly. The Beat Bugs learn that while things may change, some things like their friendship will always remain. Inspired by the song "In My Life". Guest starring Frances.
11a	11a	"Why Don't We Do It in the Road?"	Josh Wakely	Kym Goldsworthy; Story by : Josh Wakely	3 August 2016 (7TWO); 3 August 2016 (Netflix)
The Beat Bugs find a toy car and decide to take it onto the driveway of the backyard ("the Road"), which has been known to be dangerous for bugs. When the friends become trapped under a real human's car, Walter comes to their rescue. Inspired by the song "Why Don't We Do It in the Road?"
11b	11b	"The Word"	Josh Wakely	Jennifer Daley	3 August 2016 (7TWO); 3 August 2016 (Netflix)
A stalk-eyes fly named Melvin, who loves games, lures the Beat Bugs into his home and keeps them captive. He sets the friends a challenging puzzle which makes them feel trapped. The bugs teach Melvin the right way to be friends with others. Inspired by the song "The Word". Guest starring The Shins.
12a	12a	"Glass Onion"	Josh Wakely	Karen Moonah	4 August 2016 (7TWO); 3 August 2016 (Netflix)
The bugs find a Christmas tree bauble which they believe is a glass onion, and argue over who should keep it. Blackbird confiscates the ornament due to the fighting, leading the bugs to attempt to retrieve it from her nest. However, when the bauble falls and breaks, Doris the spider makes something new with the pieces. Inspired by the song "Glass Onion".
12b	12b	"Honey Pie"	Josh Wakely	Michael Stokes	4 August 2016 (7TWO); 3 August 2016 (Netflix)
Granny Bee's memory is beginning to fade and she can no longer remember the recipe to her famous honey pie. The Beat Bugs recreate one of her old cooking shows in the hope that stardom will jog her memory. In the end, a food fight helps her remember. Inspired by the song "Honey Pie". Guest starring Wesley Schultz of The Lumineers.
13a	13a	"Carry That Weight"	Josh Wakely	Deborah Jarvis	5 August 2016 (7TWO); 3 August 2016 (Netflix)
When Julia's bike destroys the ants' nest, Crick invites the colony of ants to move in with the Beat Bugs. After they are troublesome to live with, the bugs help the ants return to their home, by moving the bike and rebuilding the nest. Inspired by the song "Carry That Weight".
13b	13b	"Blackbird"	Josh Wakely	Josh Wakely & Cleon Prineas; Story by : Josh Wakely	5 August 2016 (7TWO); 3 August 2016 (Netflix)
The Beat Bugs tell the story of when they found Blackbird in the night with a broken wing. They recall how she had crashed into Mr. Moonlight, lost in her daydreams, and how they tried to help their friend fly again. The audience listening are inspired by the story of Blackbird's recovery. Inspired by the song "Blackbird". Guest starring Sia.

=== Season 2 (2016) ===
No. overall	No. in season	Title	Directed by	Written by	Original release date
14a	1a	"Yellow Submarine"	Josh Wakely	Josh Wakely	16 November 2016 (7TWO); 18 November 2016 (Netflix)
The Beat Bugs go on an expedition to find somewhere they've never gone before. When the sprinkler floods the backyard, the friends build a yellow submarine, using an old soda bottle, to find their way home. The bugs learn that the world looks different depending on how you view it. Inspired by the song "Yellow Submarine".
14b	1b	"I Call Your Name"	Josh Wakely	Michael Stokes	16 November 2016 (7TWO); 18 November 2016 (Netflix)
After a game of bugball, Walter and Jay have an argument about their gameplay, and refuse to talk to each other. The others stage an elaborate ruse to help them make amends. The pair resolve their differences and learn to play as a team. Inspired by the song "I Call Your Name".
15a	2a	"With a Little Help From My Friends"	Josh Wakely	Keith Thompson; Story by : Josh Wakely	17 November 2016 (7TWO); 18 November 2016 (Netflix)
Buzz is inspired by Walter to create a stage spectacular of her own, designed for all of the Beat Bugs to enjoy. However, when she won't accept help from anyone, the show doesn't go as planned. Buzz learns the importance of getting help from friends when they help her stage an even better performance. Inspired by the song "With a Little Help From My Friends".
15b	2b	"Get Back"	Josh Wakely	Joshua Mapleston; Story by : Josh Wakely	17 November 2016 (7TWO); 18 November 2016 (Netflix)
After Jay accidentally ruins his friends' work at the village art show, he runs away to a farm, feeling embarrassed and ashamed. The bugs go after Jay to let him know they forgive his mistake. He apologizes and returns home. Inspired by the song "Get Back".
16a	3a	"Mr. Moonlight"	Josh Wakely	Melanie Alexander; Story by : Josh Wakely	18 November 2016 (7TWO); 18 November 2016 (Netflix)
Crick recalls the time that Mr. Moonlight disappeared after believing that the Beat Bugs liked Mr. Sun more than him. With the night left in total darkness, the bugs banded together to let the moon know that he was appreciated. Mr. Moonlight returned to the village, and hasn't gone away since. Inspired by the song "Mr. Moonlight".
16b	3b	"There's a Place"	Josh Wakely	Trent O'Donnell; Story by : Josh Wakely	18 November 2016 (7TWO); 18 November 2016 (Netflix)
When Crick doesn't win any medals at the annual Bug Games, he feels disappointed and untalented. But when the backyard cat threatens to ruin the award ceremony, Crick saves the day using his own special talents and wins the Bug of the Games award. Inspired by the song "There's a Place".
17a	4a	"We Can Work it Out"	Josh Wakely	Deborah Jarvis	21 November 2016 (7TWO); 18 November 2016 (Netflix)
During a mountain climbing competition, Jay and Walter have a disagreement when Walter believes Jay is pushing him too hard and Jay thinks Walter isn't trying hard enough. Jay then tries to climb the mountain without his partner, but when he has an accidental fall, he and Walter learn how to use each other's talents to work as a team. Inspired by the song "We Can Work It Out".
17b	4b	"Sgt. Pepper's Lonely Hearts Club Band"	Josh Wakely	Cleon Prineas; Story by : Josh Wakely	21 November 2016 (7TWO); 18 November 2016 (Netflix)
Walter longs for a performer for a friend, and feels at home when the circus, Sgt. Pepper's Lonely Hearts Club Band, comes to town. Walter is invited to assist in the ringmaster duties, and, impressed with his talent, Sgt. Pepper asks him to take over the role permanently. Walter decides to leave with the circus, but is in turn convinced by the Beat Bugs to stay. Inspired by the song "Sgt. Pepper's Lonely Hearts Club Band". Guest starring Rod Stewart.
18a	5a	"Christmas Time is Here Again"	Josh Wakely	Melanie Alexander; Story by : Josh Wakely	22 November 2016 (7TWO); 18 November 2016 (Netflix)
It's Christmas time and Buzz has her heart set on meeting Christmas Beetle, after she sends him a letter requesting a visit. The Beat Bugs try to keep Buzz awake on Christmas eve to help her fulfill her wish. They all fall asleep and miss seeing Christmas Beetle, however in the morning, Buzz tracks down her hero and her wish comes true. Inspired by the song "Christmas Time (Is Here Again)".
18b	5b	"Drive My Car"	Josh Wakely	Jeff Biederman	22 November 2016 (7TWO); 18 November 2016 (Netflix)
The bugs meet a remote-controlled car named Dee-structor, who has no idea who controls him, and is saddened by this lack of power and choice. Crick breaks off the car's antenna and allows Dee-structor to finally take control of himself. Inspired by the song "Drive My Car". Guest starting Chris Cornell.
19a	6a	"Tomorrow Never Knows"	Josh Wakely	Barbara Haynes	23 November 2016 (7TWO); 18 November 2016 (Netflix)
Julia loses her rainbow brooch in the backyard and the bugs set off to find it. Once Kumi spots it, the friends use the ornament as a boat to sail back to the Big House across puddles of rain. They then leave the brooch in the garden for Julia to find. Inspired by the song "Tomorrow Never Knows".
19b	6b	"Nowhere Man"	Josh Wakely	Cleon Prineas; Story by : Josh Wakely	23 November 2016 (7TWO); 18 November 2016 (Netflix)
On their way to go camping, the Beat Bugs lose their map and become lost. While searching for the map, the friends meet the elusive Nowhere Man, who turns out to be a worm named Warren, who is not as scary as he once seemed. Warren helps the bugs find their way home. Inspired by the song "Nowhere Man".
20a	7a	"Strawberry Fields Forever"	Josh Wakely	Erica Harrison; Story by : Josh Wakely	24 November 2016 (7TWO); 18 November 2016 (Netflix)
While in the strawberry fields, the bugs warn a trio of hungry mynah birds not to eat too much, as they fear there might not be enough strawberries to last forever. The friends think of a plan, involving a scarecrow, to send the birds away and save the fields. Inspired by the song "Strawberry Fields Forever".
20b	7b	"The Fool on the Hill"	Josh Wakely	Richard Clark	24 November 2016 (7TWO); 18 November 2016 (Netflix)
The friends find a garden gnome on the hill which they believe is alive. Cockroach secretly pretends to be the gnome by giving the ornament a voice, in an attempt to scam the Beat Bugs into finding food for him. Sceptical, Kumi discovers Cockroach and tricks him into revealing his deceit. Inspired by the song "The Fool on the Hill".
21a	8a	"And Your Bird Can Sing"	Josh Wakely	Josh Wakely & Joshua Mapleston; Story by : Josh Wakely	25 November 2016 (7TWO); 18 November 2016 (Netflix)
Jay decides to visit the Big House for his holiday while the other bugs explore the Wonders of the Village. However, when neither of the expeditions go as planned, Blackbird helps Jay finally see the house up close. Inspired by the song "And Your Bird Can Sing". Guest starring Regina Spektor.
21b	8b	"I'll Follow the Sun"	Josh Wakely	Josh Wakely & Joshua Mapleston; Story by : Josh Wakely	25 November 2016 (7TWO); 18 November 2016 (Netflix)
Kumi is upset when she finds out that Blackbird's wing has healed and she will be leaving the garden to rejoin her flock. Kumi tries to get her friend to stay, but later realises that Blackbird belongs with her flock and she must say goodbye. Inspired by the song "I'll Follow the Sun". Guest starring Jennifer Hudson.
22a	9a	"Hello Goodbye"	Josh Wakely	Joshua Mapleston; Story by : Josh Wakely	28 November 2016 (7TWO); 18 November 2016 (Netflix)
A human drops his mobile phone in the backyard, leaving the bugs fascinated by the device. They try to work out what it is, before Kumi inadvertently answers a call, helping the friends to learn what the phone can do. The human finds his phone and the bugs decide to make their own communication device. Inspired by the song "Hello, Goodbye".
22b	9b	"Got to Get You Into My Life"	Josh Wakely	Jennifer Daley	28 November 2016 (7TWO); 18 November 2016 (Netflix)
Feeling like he doesn't share any interests with his friends, Walter he finds comfort in "befriending" an inanimate ball. The other bugs discover that the ball is a lost toy of Bulldog's which has been missing. Walter returns the ball to the dog and reunites with his real friends. Inspired by the song "Got to Get You Into My Life".
23a	10a	"Eleanor Rigby"	Josh Wakely	Josh Wakely & Cleon Prineas; Story by : Josh Wakely	29 November 2016 (7TWO); 18 November 2016 (Netflix)
A duo of filmmaking flies arrive to capture footage of an elusive creature, rumoured to be named Eleanor Rigby, who has been roaming the village. In a moment of truth, the figure turns out to be Kumi, but the filmmakers are disheartened that they have not found the "real" Eleanor Rigby. The flies vow to continue their search. Inspired by the song "Eleanor Rigby". Guest starring Of Monsters and Men.
23b	10b	"I'm So Tired"	Josh Wakely	Josh Wakely & Cleon Prineas; Story by : Josh Wakely	29 November 2016 (7TWO); 18 November 2016 (Netflix)
The Mudwasps are renovating their home and the noise is keeping the Beat Bugs awake at night, so the friends volunteer to lend a hand in the constructions. The bugs make a mess of the house, but the Mudwasps love it anyway, leaving them all free to get some sleep. Inspired by the song "I'm So Tired".
24a	11a	"Hey Bulldog"	Josh Wakely	Kate Mulvany	30 November 2016 (7TWO); 18 November 2016 (Netflix)
Crick uses a speech decoding machine to find out more about his new friend Bulldog. The bugs discover he is a stray and has dreams of becoming a sheepdog. The humans of the Big House decide to keep Bulldog as a pet, who is beyond pleased to become a guard dog for the family. Inspired by the song "Hey Bulldog". Guest starring James Bay.
24b	11b	"I'm Happy Just to Dance with You"	Josh Wakely	Josh Wakely & Cleon Prineas; Story by : Josh Wakely	30 November 2016 (7TWO); 18 November 2016 (Netflix)
The bugs find an old chess table top in the garbage and decide to use it as the dance floor for a dress-up dance party. Milli Pede and Morgs are hesitant to attend, but Jay helps them find the confidence to step outside of their comfort zones. Inspired by the song "I'm Happy Just to Dance with You". Guest starring Tori Kelly.
25a	12a	"It Won't Be Long"	Josh Wakely	Trent O'Donnell; Story by : Josh Wakely	1 December 2016 (7TWO); 18 November 2016 (Netflix)
A human has been gardening in the backyard, and Buzz and Morgs fall into a deep hole in the ground. The other bugs plan to use Doris's rope ladder to get them out, but before they can come to the rescue, Buzz discovers a tunnel which leads the pair out of the hole. Inspired by the song "It Won't Be Long".
25b	12b	"Any Time at All"	Josh Wakely	Tamara Asmar	1 December 2016 (7TWO); 18 November 2016 (Netflix)
Buzz has an encounter with Meow the cat which leaves her too scared to go outside. The bugs give her a device allowing her to call for their help at any time. However, when Buzz calls upon the bugs' help too much, her friends fail to come to her rescue when a real emergency strikes, leaving Buzz to face the cat alone. Inspired by the song "Any Time at All".
26a	13a	"Please Mr. Postman"	Josh Wakely	Cleon Prineas; Story by : Josh Wakely	2 December 2016 (7TWO); 18 November 2016 (Netflix)
Buzz hurts her ankle on the way to the beach and is ordered to bed rest. With Postman Bee's help, the bugs send a letter to Blackbird asking her to help cheer up Buzz with a visit, as she once had a broken wing herself. Blackbird arrives and spends some time with the bugs at the beach. Inspired by the song "Please Mr. Postman"
26b	13b	"Across the Universe"	Josh Wakely	Keith Thompson; Story by : Josh Wakely	2 December 2016 (7TWO); 18 November 2016 (Netflix)
The bugs' home is at stake when the humans of the house decide to pave the backyard with concrete. The friends float in bubbles up to the Big House to ask Julia to save the garden. As a result, the young girl hears the bugs and convinces her mother to leave the backyard as it is. Inspired by the song "Across the Universe".

=== Special (2017) ===
No. overall	No. in season	Title	Directed by	Written by	Original release date
27	1	"Beat Bugs: All Together Now"	Josh Wakely	John Armstrong, Cleon Prineas, Erica Harrison; Story by : Josh Wakely	21 November 2017 (Netflix); 4 December 2018 (7TWO)
The Beat Bugs go on a journey to compete in Bug Factor, hosted by Queen Bee. Features the songs "Here Comes the Sun", "I Want to Hold Your Hand". "All Together Now" and "Ticket to Ride". Guest starring Cat Stevens. Note: This special has an extended run time of 48 minutes.

=== Season 3 (2018) ===
No. overall	No. in season	Title	Directed by	Written by	Original release date
28a	1a	"A Day in the Life"	Josh Wakely	Cleon Prineas	5 December 2018 (7TWO); 9 November 2018 (Netflix)
While attempting to break the bug speed record, Jay accidentally bumps his head and forgets who he is and his friends. Lucy arrives to help Jay remember himself by walking him through "a day in the life" of Jay. Inspired by the song "A Day in the Life". Guest starring Chloe Kohanski.
28b	1b	"Paperback Writer"	Josh Wakely	Charlotte Rose Hamlyn	5 December 2018 (7TWO); 9 November 2018 (Netflix)
Kumi creates a comic book called Super-Super Oona which she is proud of until she sees her friends' recent creations which makes her think her comic is no good. However, her pages are blown in the wind and everyone sees her comic. Inspired by the song "Paperback Writer".
29a	2a	"Ob-La-Di, Ob-La-Da"	Josh Wakely	Erica Harrison	6 December 2018 (7TWO); 9 November 2018 (Netflix)
While Buzz attempts to do a magic trick, Julia drops her mother's perfume bottle causing a mist to go over the yard. The next day all the bugs cannot stop speaking in rhyme and enlist the help of Walter's Uncle Tusk to help break the "curse". Inspired by the song "Ob-La-Di, Ob-La-Da"
29b	2b	"Two of Us"	Josh Wakely	Keith Thompson	6 December 2018 (7TWO); 9 November 2018 (Netflix)
Following the events of All Together Now, Freda has moved in with Walter, but their happy reunion is hindered by their cramped living space. They resolve to have Freda move into her own place, but both become saddened over the distance. Inspired by the song "Two of Us". Guest starring Kate Miller-Heidke
30a	3a	"Yesterday"	Josh Wakely	Cleon Prineas	7 December 2018 (7TWO); 9 November 2018 (Netflix)
While having a birthday party, Julia accidentally leaves behind her stuffed bear Maxwell and her father takes him to the trash. The Beat Bugs band together to get Julia's attention before the "Disappearers" (garbage men) take him away. Inspired by the song "Yesterday". Guest starring Nic Jeffries
30b	3b	"Taxman"	Josh Wakely	Kym Goldsworthy	7 December 2018 (7TWO); 9 November 2018 (Netflix)
When Bulldog accidentally destroys the bug village, Geoff the Cockroach steps in by demanding tax in food so that the ants can build a new village. However, he keeps demanding more despite the fact that no work seems to be done. Inspired by the song "Taxman". Guest starring Dave Faulkner
31a	4a	"Let It Be"	Josh Wakely	Keith Thompson	10 December 2018 (7TWO); 9 November 2018 (Netflix)
Buzz sees a magical "lovely light" which is soon covered by a tarp. She goes to find the light but the other Beat Bugs are skeptical and don't join her. Soon after they go looking for Buzz and get lost until they all meet a glowing insect named Mother Mary who guides them to safety. Inspired by the song "Let It Be". Guest starring Samantha Gongol.
31b	4b	"Revolution"	Josh Wakely	Cleon Prineas	10 December 2018 (7TWO); 9 November 2018 (Netflix)
Julia's father begins cutting the yard with a weed whacker, which causes a tornado from the Bugs' point of view. To protect their homeland, Jay leads the Beat Bugs to fight back against the gigants in a bug-sized revolution. Inspired by the song "Revolution".
32a	5a	"She Came in Through the Bathroom Window"	Josh Wakely	Josh Mapleston	11 December 2018 (7TWO); 9 November 2018 (Netflix)
The stink bug's home is destroyed by Julia's toddler sister carrying a silver spoon. The Beat Bugs form a police department to protect the insects from the next attack by the "monster". Inspired by the song "She Came in Through the Bathroom Window".
32b	5b	"Lady Madonna"	Josh Wakely	Kate Mulvany	11 December 2018 (7TWO); 9 November 2018 (Netflix)
The Beat Bugs meet a Russian nesting doll named "Lady Madonna" who has become separated from the smallest doll, her youngest child. The Beat Bugs have to find a way to cross the humongous highway and reunite mother and son, while Walter watches all the doll's other children. Inspired by the song "Lady Madonna."
33a	6a	"I'm Only Sleeping"	Josh Wakely	Cleon Prineas	12 December 2018 (7TWO); 9 November 2018 (Netflix)
Crick spends so much time working on the other Beat Bugs' inventions for an upcoming inventors competition that he can't get any sleep. He rushes off to find a place where he can finally get some sleep and work on his own invention. Inspired by the song "I'm Only Sleeping".
33b	6b	"Oh! Darling"	Josh Wakely	Thomas Duncan-Watt	12 December 2018 (7TWO); 9 November 2018 (Netflix)
During Halloween, the Beat Bugs go into a strange place they've never seen before with unusual objects and shiny metal balls. A scary spider sings to try to make friends with them, but that frightens the Beat Bugs even more. Inspired by the song "Oh! Darling".
34a	7a	"Michelle"	Josh Wakely	Charlotte Rose Hamlyn	13 December 2018 (7TWO); 9 November 2018 (Netflix)
When the other Beat Bugs run off to play podball without her, Kumi stumbles across a book on France. Kumi changes her look and pretends to be Michelle, Kumi's French princess cousin, so that the other Beat Bugs will give her more attention. Inspired by the song "Michelle".
34b	7b	"You Won't See Me"	Josh Wakely	Thomas Duncan-Watt	13 December 2018 (7TWO); 9 November 2018 (Netflix)
A huckster chameleon comes to town trying to sell red caps to the Beat Bugs and friends. He says the red caps will inspire them to achieve their dreams, but he is actually using his power of invisibility to trick them. Once they realize the caps are a fraud, the Beat Bugs search for the invisible scam artist. Inspired by the song "You Won't See Me". Guest starring Noah Kahan.
35a	8a	"I'm Down"	Josh Wakely	Erica Harrison	14 December 2018 (7TWO); 9 November 2018 (Netflix)
Witnessing a flying competition, Buzz is inspired to learn to fly better and join the competition herself. However, she gets discouraged when some of the bugs laugh at her early failures. Inspired by the song "I'm Down".
35b	8b	"Mother Nature's Son"	Josh Wakely	Josh Mapleston	14 December 2018 (7TWO); 9 November 2018 (Netflix)
With winter cooling things down quickly, Crick tries to find a way to warm up, and learns lessons about nature from a friendly singing frog. Inspired by the song "Mother Nature's Son".
36a	9a	"Come and Get It"	Josh Wakely	Cleon Prineas	17 December 2018 (7TWO); 9 November 2018 (Netflix)
While recording a cooking show, Walter accidentally uses too much of the Beat Bugs' food supply. Their solution is to take some of the food from the gigant's cat's bowl. However, Meow catches them in the act and starts chasing them. Inspired by the song "Come and Get It".
36b	9b	"The Night Before"	Josh Wakely	Josh Mapleston	17 December 2018 (7TWO); 9 November 2018 (Netflix)
The day after winning a drama award, none of the Beat Bugs can remember what happened on the night before, despite a lot of strange clues. Luckily Crick had Doctor Robot record most of the night's events, so they slowly get their memories back. Inspired by the song "The Night Before".
37a	10a	"Hey Jude"	Josh Wakely	John Armstrong	18 December 2018 (7TWO); 9 November 2018 (Netflix)
While Julia is watching the now toddler Jude, she gets out and starts walking toward the humongous highway. The Beat Bugs and friends try to change her course by singing to her in unison. Inspired by the song "Hey Jude".
37b	10b	"Martha My Dear"	Josh Wakely	Cleon Prineas	18 December 2018 (7TWO); 9 November 2018 (Netflix)
Uncle Tusk’s co-star, Martha goes missing Before she is due to star in a big show, The beat bugs must follow a trail of clues to see if they can find Martha in time. Inspired by the song "Martha My Dear"
38a	11a	"From Me to You"	Josh Wakely	Cleon Prineas	19 December 2018 (7TWO); 9 November 2018 (Netflix)
When Walter saves the life of Mo the Mosquito, Mo feels indebted and becomes Walter's new best friend. However, this ostracizes the rest of the Beat Bugs, and Walter has to find a way out of the situation. Inspired by the song "From Me to You".
38b	11b	"Baby, You're a Rich Man"	Josh Wakely	Keith Thompson	19 December 2018 (7TWO); 9 November 2018 (Netflix)
Walter decides to visit his old neighborhood and old best friend Artie, only to find out that Artie has become amazingly wealthy since they last met. When Arties asks Walter to move back, Walter must choose between being rich or staying with the Beat Bugs. Inspired by the song "Baby, You're a Rich Man".
39a	12a	"Only a Northern Song"	Josh Wakely	Cleon Prineas	20 December 2018 (7TWO); 9 November 2018 (Netflix)
When Buzz is handing out invitations to her birthday party, she hears some unusual music she's never heard before, coming from the Northern Bugs. She invites them to play at her birthday party but is surprised that most of her friends don't like the bugs or music from the North. Inspired by the song "Only a Northern Song".
39b	12b	"I'll Be on My Way"	Josh Wakely	Charlotte Rose Hamlyn	10 December 2018 (7TWO); 9 November 2018 (Netflix)
The Beat Bugs are saddened to learn that Granny Bee is preparing to crossover as she reaches the end of her lifespan. Inspired by the song "I'll Be on My Way".
40a	13a	"Good Morning Good Morning"	Josh Wakely	Cleon Prineas	21 December 2018 (7TWO); 9 November 2018 (Netflix)
Julia has a pet rooster named Feathers. Inspired by the song "Good Morning Good Morning".
40b	13b	"The Long and Winding Road"	Josh Wakely	John Armstrong	21 December 2018 (7TWO); 9 November 2018 (Netflix)
While trading old stories, Walter tells buzz that memories come from the long and winding road of life. Buzz takes that literally and embarks on a journey through the gigants' yard sale which causes her to remember events from previous episodes. Inspired by the song "The Long and Winding Road".
