= Beat Bugs =

Children's television series

- Genre: Musical; Preschool; Comedy; Educational
- Created by: Josh Wakely
- Written by: Thomas Duncan-Watt; Kate Mulvaney; Cleon Prineas; John Armstrong; Katherine Thompson
- Directed by: Josh Wakely
- Voices of: Erin Mathews; Ashleigh Ball; Lili Beaudoin; Rebecca Husain; Charles Demers
- Opening theme: "All You Need Is Love" performed by Andy Bull, Gossling, iOTA, Lisa Mitchell and Sullivan.
- Ending theme: "All You Need Is Love"
- Composers: Licensed music: John Lennon; Paul McCartney; George Harrison; "Mr. Moonlight" written by: Roy Lee Johnson; "Please Mr. Postman" written by: Georgia Dobbins; William Garrett; Freddie Gorman; Brian Holland; Robert Bateman; Score composers: Daniel Johns; Daniel Denholm; Original music: Robert Mothersbaugh; Mark Mothersbaugh
- Countries of origin: Australia; Canada (seasons 1–2)
- No. of seasons: 3
- No. of episodes: 39 + 1 special (list of episodes)

Production
- Executive producers: Trevor Roy; Mikael Borglund; Josh Wakely; Damian Trotter; Martin Bandier; Ron Saunders (seasons 1–2); Ivan Fecan (seasons 1–2); Rob Simmons (seasons 1–2); Tim Gamble (seasons 1–2); Frank Giustra (seasons 1–2); Rebecca Graham (season 3); Sue Bea Montgomery (season 3)
- Producers: Josh Wakely; Jennifer Twiner McCarron
- Running time: 12 minutes (segments); 24 minutes (full); 48 minutes (special)
- Production companies: Grace: A Storytelling Company; Thunderbird Entertainment (seasons 1–2); Beyond Entertainment; Atomic Cartoons (seasons 1–2); Seven Network

Original release
- Network: Netflix; 7TWO (Australia)
- Release: August 3, 2016 – November 9, 2018

Beat Bugs is an CGI animated children's television series, created by Josh Wakely, and produced for Netflix by Grace: A Storytelling Company and Thunderbird Entertainment from 2016 to 2018. The series is centred around five young anthropomorphised insects who live in an overgrown suburban backyard and learn life lessons while having adventures. Wakely acquired worldwide rights from Sony/ATV Music Publishing to a catalogue of music by the Beatles to feature in the series. The program features versions of Beatles songs, performed by contemporary recording artists and interwoven into the narrative.

Beat Bugs was produced in association with Beyond Entertainment, Atomic Cartoons and the Seven Network, an investor of the program. The series was first made available worldwide on Netflix on 3 August 2016 after premiering in Australia exclusively on 7TWO on 25 July 2016. It also airs on the CBC Kids programing block of CBC.

The program received an AWGIE Award in animation for an episode script in 2016, an AACTA Award for Best Children's Television Series and a Daytime Emmy Award in 2017. The second season premiered in November 2016 on Netflix and 7TWO, and was followed by a 48-minute special in November 2017. Additional episodes entered pre-production in 2018. A staged production featuring the characters and themes of the show, Beat Bugs: A Musical Adventure, began playing in theaters in the U.S. in October 2018.

== Plot ==
Beat Bugs is a series for children between the ages of 5 and 7, set in an overgrown suburban backyard, which serves as an environment that 5 young bug friends regularly explore. To the bugs, the backyard is known as "Village Green". Songs by the Beatles, such as "Come Together" and "Lucy in the Sky with Diamonds", are interwoven into the narrative of the episodes. 1 episode, "Come and Get It" features a song that was originally recorded by the band, Badfinger, albeit written by the Beatle Paul McCartney and published under the Beatles' Apple Records label. These versions are performed by popular recording artists such as Pink and Sia. The songs often influence the life lessons that the young bugs learn.

Wakely described the series as "about teaching kids, but with a bit of humor and not in a patronizing way." He stated that the message of the song "All You Need is Love" was the main idea he wanted to portray.

== Episodes ==
Season	Episodes	Originally released
1	13	3 August 2016
2	13	18 November 2016
Special	1	21 November 2017
3	13	9 November 2018

== Cast and characters ==
=== Main ===
- Kumi: Kumi is a confident and imaginative ladybug with a zest for life who is protective of her friends. She is also the leader of the group. Speaking voice provided by Erin Mathews and singing voice provided by Lisa Mitchell.
- Jay: Jay is a curious, ambitious and impulsive beetle who likes skateboarding and music. He is the second leader of the group. Speaking voice provided by Ashleigh Ball and singing voice provided by Andy Bull.
- Lili Beaudoin as Crick, an intelligent and creative cricket who is also an inventor. He likes science and math. He wears a brown hat, a gray T-shirt, beige pants and yellow Converse shoes. Singing voice provided by Sullivan and Julia Stone.
- Charles Demers as Walter, a theatrical blue slug with a big heart but excessive fears. Singing voice provided by iOTA and Daniel Johns.
- Rebecca Husain as Buzz, an optimistic and enthusiastic fruit fly who is the youngest of the group. Singing voice provided by Gossling.

=== Recurring ===
- Lucy the Dragonfly is a dragonfly with kaleidoscope eyes who is a sleep doctor.
- Boris the Frog (Doron Bell, singing Aloe Blacc) is a frog who loves things Mother Nature provided.
- Postman Bee (Brian Drummond; singing Wesley Schultz) is a bee who, as his name implies, works as a postal worker. He is never late and always gets his deliveries right, unless he is feeling sad about something. He cares a great deal for his grandmother, Granny Bee (Nicole Oliver) who was once a famous TV chef known for her honey pie.
- Doris the Spider (Gwynyth Walsh) is an elderly arachnid who is always filling her garden with beautiful art pieces that are made from her webbing and various other objects found in the backyard. She teaches the bugs to see the beauty in everything.
- Geoff the Cockroach (Peter Kelamis; singing Dave Faulkner) is an opportunistic roach who acts like a sleazy business man. He typically sells homes to the residents in the backyard, implying that he is a realtor. He gets along with Alex the Stinkbug.
- Alex the Stinkbug (Fred Ewanuick) is a jokey bug that is always farting. His farts are powerful enough to power machines built by Crick. He can be uncouth, but is very friendly. He gets along with Geoff the Cockroach.
- Dr. Robert (Ian Hanlin) is a mantis in the medical profession. He is very friendly and has perfect bedside manners. He always seems to know the perfect treatment for certain ailments.
- Katter (Britt McKillip; singing Frances) is a pretty caterpillar who later transforms into a butterfly. She is soft-spoken and shy, but is very friendly with everyone. She is best friends with Morgs and Millie.
- Morgs (David Paul Grove; singing James Corden) is a very nervous and self-conscious stick bug. He has trouble standing up for himself and wishes that he wasn't "just a stick". He is best friends with Katter and Millie.
- Millie Pede (Maryke Hendrikse; singing Tori Kelly) is a multifooted millipede who is kind and reserved. She is unsure of her dancing ability, but with help from her friends learns to do so effectively. She is best friends with Morgs and Katter.
- Mr. Sun (Michael Caton; singing Robbie Williams and Yusuf Islam / Cat Stevens) is the large all seeing star during the daytime. Despite his largeness, he can speak directly to the bugs and has even sent and received letters from them. In All Together Now, Mr. Sun now has a beard and arms.
- Mr. Moonlight (Robert Alexander and Charles Demers) is Mr. Sun's nighttime counterpart. He can be playful with the bugs, but sometimes feels that they like Mr. Sun more than him.
- Dr. Robot (Peter Kelamis; singing Ev Jones) is a special robot that Crick built to help his friends while Dr. Robert was on vacation. Despite a few kinks here and there he has proven to be efficient. When Dr. Robert returned, Dr. Robot became Crick's assistant for his experiments.
- Blackbird (Bethany Brown; singing Sia, Regina Spektor, and Jennifer Hudson) is a bird that always has her head in the clouds, both figuratively and literally. The bugs helped her damaged wing and in return, she stuck around to help them in any way she could.
- Mr. Mudwasp (Andrew Hansen; singing Daniel Johns), a wasp, and working man who lives in a hive that he is constantly renovating. He is always trying to speak in foreign terms. He has numerous wasp children with his constantly pregnant wife, Mrs. Mudwasp (Ashleigh Ball). They were once identified as the Hendersons. Mr. Mudwasp has also been identified as Baz.
- The Ants (Kyle Rideout) are the colony workers of the backyard. They all think uniformly as one and thus have a hard time acting as separate people. They all live in one ant hill and become lost if anything happened to it.
- Freda (Shannon Chan-Kent; singing Kate Miller-Heidke) is Walter's long lost sister introduced in All Together Now. She is a very ditsy slug that shares many similarities and differences with her twin brother. She moves into a house next door to Walter. She is named after the Beatles' secretary Freda Kelly.
- Glowies are glow bugs that act as a full light source for all the bugs. They always seem to be angry or annoyed at everyone, possibly because they are constantly used all the time and are treated more like objects. Nevertheless, they do their job effectively.
- Octopus (Jay Brazeau) is a talking sprinkler toy that resembles a purple octopus. He only communicates with the bugs and provides comfort to everyone by spraying water. However, he is only capable of doing so when the hose he is connected to is on.
- Bulldog (Colin Murdock; singing James Bay) is a big friendly slobbering dog. He initially had no home or way to communicate with the bugs, but Crick builds a translator and is adopted by the humans.
- Mee-Yow (Ashleigh Ball) is a cat that is owned by the humans. He roams about the yard and, while not necessarily mean, is shown to be rather dangerous to the bugs as he tends to attack and play with them.
- The Man (JR Bourne and Ian Hanlin) and Julia's Mom (Erin Mathews) are Gigants, they are what the bugs refer to humans whom the bugs are fascinated by. They live in the "Big House" at the edge of the backyard. They have a daughter named Julia, and have a second daughter named Jude in All Together Now.
- Julia (Rebecca Husain) is the first born daughter of the humans who live in the "Big House". Jay seems to relate to her. As of All Together Now, Julia becomes a big sister after her mom has a baby girl named Jude.

== Production ==
=== Conception ===
Beat Bugs was created by Josh Wakely who in 2014, under his US-Australian production company Grace, acquired worldwide rights from Sony/ATV Music Publishing to a catalogue of music by the Beatles. The music was to be used for a children's animated series in development to be entitled Beat Bugs, which would tell the story of young bugs learning life lessons set to songs by the popular rock group. The publishers liked Wakely's vision of bringing the classic songs to a new audience of children with original stories written around them. Managing director of Sony/ATV Damian Trotter stated, "the idea of opening up the single greatest music catalogue of the 20th Century to the next generation is something we are particularly excited about". The music acquired was the Lennon-McCartney "Northern Songs" catalogue. The deal reportedly cost an estimated $10 million.

Wakely, an Australian writer and producer who grew up as a fan of the Beatles, stated that he never considered using any other artist's music for the series. He said, "people in years to come will talk about the Beatles like we talk about Shakespeare." Wakely spent three years originally working on the show before acquiring the rights to the Beatles' music, and by this time, he had already conceived all of the episodes and characters. Of the characters, he said, "They have lived in my head for so long that I don't have their date of conception". Wakely sold the project to Netflix as a global distribution partner. The Seven Network in Australia was also an investor of the production.

Daniel Johns, former singer of Silverchair, arranged and produced the music for the series as musical director. He stated, "It's a dream job to go into the studio and dissect all of the Beatles' music". Johns and Wakely had previously worked together on a musical short film which Wakely wrote and directed. Wakely was closely involved in the production, arranging and mixing of the music.

More than 1000 people were involved in the production of the show, including a worldwide team of writers and animators in Australia, Los Angeles and Vancouver. Wakely described the process as a full-time job lasting three years. Vancouver's Atomic Cartoons created the 3D animation for the series. By the show's premiere, Wakely had spent six years working on the program from its conception. It wasn't originally planned to produce Beat Bugs in Australia until Beyond Entertainment allowed Wakely to do so.

=== Release ===
The initial order of 52 segments (26 half-hour episodes) was split into two 13-episode seasons for distribution. The episodes were a given a provisional classification of C (children's) in Australia over 2014–15. All episodes from Season 1 became available on Netflix in the US on 3 August 2016. Prior to its premiere, on 27 July 2016, the series was renewed for a second season to debut later in the year. The first season premiered exclusively in Australia on 7TWO on 25 July 2016. Season 2 was released through Netflix on 18 November 2016. The second season also debuted on 7TWO on 16 November 2016. A 48-minute special entitled Beat Bugs: All Together Now, premiered on Netflix on 21 November 2017. The third season premiered in November 2018.

== Reception ==
Beat Bugs generally received favourable reviews. Critics praised the concept of reimagining Beatles songs for a young audience. Reporting for Common Sense Media, Emily Ashby said "this unique series borrows some of rock-and-roll's most recognizable lyrics to help tell its gentle stories and teach excellent life lessons", commending it as a series for parents and children to watch together. David Knox of TV Tonight praised the music for "bursting with optimism and exuberance", while describing the animation as "an alluring, inviting feast". A reviewer for the Daily Telegraph applauded how the series presents children with "an influence that lasts beyond the screen time".

Ivan Radford of VODzilla.co noted that the program as a whole "is something closer to a visual album than a series", and stated that the show's theme song of "All You Need is Love" provides "an upbeat sentiment that gives an overall theme and identity to this strange universe". However, Radford expressed that the main characters are not always fully developed.

Beat Bugs received a 2016 AWGIE Award in animation for the episode script of "Yellow Submarine", written by Wakely. The episodes "Hey Bulldog", written by Kate Mulvany, and "Ticket to Ride", by Erica Harrison, were also nominated. The program also won an AACTA Award for Best Children's Television Series. Beat Bugs was also nominated for five 2017 Daytime Emmy Awards in 2017, and won the Emmy for Outstanding Writing in a Preschool Animated Program.

The series also received some negative comments. Jordan Runtagh of Decider disliked the character of Jay, stating "I find the lack of comeuppance for his behavior distressing". He stated the music of the series is "forgettable, but inoffensive", however added that the songs are incorporated into the episode narratives "with grace and skill". Decider's Jessica Jernigan of described the series as "disheartening and dull because there's so little art in the transformation of Beatles lyrics into stories", suggesting that the songs were already appropriate for children "without visual or narrative contextualization."

== Broadcast and release ==
The first season was added to the Australian Netflix library on 28 February 2017. In Australia, Beat Bugs premiered on pay-TV channel Nick Jr. in May 2017. The free-to-air broadcasting of the series moved to 7flix in 2017 to continue airing repeats.

In Canada, the show started airing on the CBC Kids programming block on CBC on 26 February 2018. In Ukraine, the show started airing on the Niki Junior in April 2019, titles are localized, all songs are subtitled.

== Possible film adaptation ==
On 10 May 2019, MGM picked up the film rights to the series with Wakely writing and producing the film.

== Awards and nominations ==
Year	Award	Category	Recipient	Result	Ref.
2016	AWGIE Awards	Animation	"Hey Bulldog" – Kate Mulvany	Nominated	
2016	AWGIE Awards	Animation	"Ticket to Ride" – Erica Harrison	Nominated	
2016	AWGIE Awards	Animation	"Yellow Submarine" – Josh Wakely	Won	
2016	AACTA Awards	Best Children's Television Series	Beat Bugs	Won	
2017	Canadian Screen Awards	Best Animated Program or Series	Beat Bugs	Nominated	
2017	Logie Awards	Outstanding Children's Program	Beat Bugs	Nominated	
2017	Daytime Emmy Awards	Outstanding Writing in a Preschool Animated Program	Josh Wakely, Joshua Mapleston, Cleon Prineas	Won	
2017	Daytime Emmy Awards	Outstanding Directing in a Preschool Animated Program	Josh Wakely	Nominated	
2017	Daytime Emmy Awards	Outstanding Main Title and Graphic Design	Directed by Josh Wakely, Storyboard by Mark Appleby, Animation Director Pablo De La Torre, Director Jon Mead, Animation Supervisor Fredrick Fasse, Animation/Layout Supervisor Alexandru Nagy	Nominated	
2017	Daytime Emmy Awards	Outstanding Sound Mixing in a Preschool Animated Program	Brent Clark, Sam Hayward, Wes Swales, Bob Mothersbaugh	Nominated	
2017	Daytime Emmy Awards	Outstanding Sound Editing in a Preschool Animated Program	Beat Bugs – Jared Dwyer, Sam Hayward, Blair Slater	Nominated	
2018	Daytime Emmy Awards	Outstanding Sound Mixing in a Preschool Animated Program	Sam Hayward, Wes Swales, Robert Mothersbaugh, Brent Clark (for "All Together Now")	Nominated	
2018	Daytime Emmy Awards	Outstanding Sound Editing in a Preschool Animated Program	Sam Hayward, Jason Fernandez, Alex Birch, Sean Carey, Jared Dwyer, Sam Gain-Emery, Thom Kellar, Blair Slater (for "All Together Now")	Nominated	
2019	Kidscreen Awards	Best One-Off, Special or TV Movie		Nominated	
2019	AWGIE Awards	Animation	"Lady Madonna" – Kate Mulvany	Nominated	
2019	AWGIE Awards	Animation	"You Won't See Me" – Thomas Duncan-Watt	Won	
2019	Daytime Emmy Awards	Outstanding Sound Mixing in a Preschool Animated Program	Sam Gain-Emery, Sam Hayward, Thom Kellar, Daniel Denholm, Sean Carey, Brent Clark, Wes Swales, Bob Mothersbaugh	Won	
2019	Daytime Emmy Awards	Outstanding Sound Editing in a Preschool Animated Program	Sam Hayward, Jason Fernandez, Alex Birch, Sean Carey, Jared Dwyer, Sam Gain-Emery, Thom Kellar and Blair Slater	Nominated	

== Other media ==
=== Soundtracks ===
The first soundtrack to the show, "Beat Bugs: The Complete Season One" was released on online music-streaming service Apple Music on 3 August 2016. The release featured all of the songs performed by the guest artists in the first season, compiled on one soundtrack. It was only available exclusively on Apple Music until 4 November 2016. The record was released by Republic Records and Universal Music. Melodia Music was formed by the show's production to release music from Beat Bugs and other related productions.

A new compilation album, "Beat Bugs: The Best of Seasons 1 & 2" was released physically and digitally on 4 November 2016. This was the first time a selection of the music from the first season was available for purchase, and included songs from the second season ahead of its premiere. "Beat Bugs: The Complete Season One" was also made available on iTunes for the first time.

"Beat Bugs: The Complete Season Two" was made available on iTunes on 18 November 2016 at the same time as its Netflix premiere. Two apps were also made.

=== Beat Bugs: A Musical Adventure ===
A live musical stage show, Beat Bugs: A Musical Adventure, began playing in theaters in the United States in October 2018. The show, running 60 minutes, was written by Sean Cercone and David Abbinanti. The show's plot involves the characters seeking to save Strawberry Fields from a stinkbug with other plans for them. The show includes the songs "All You Need Is Love", "Come Together", "Yellow Submarine", "Lucy In The Sky With Diamonds", "Strawberry Fields Forever", "Eleanor Rigby", and "With A Little Help From My Friends". It is a production of Pantochino Productions.

== See also ==
- Motown Magic
