= Mani Lal Bhaumik =

Bengali American physicist (born 1931)

Mani Lal Bhaumik মণিলাল ভৌমিক
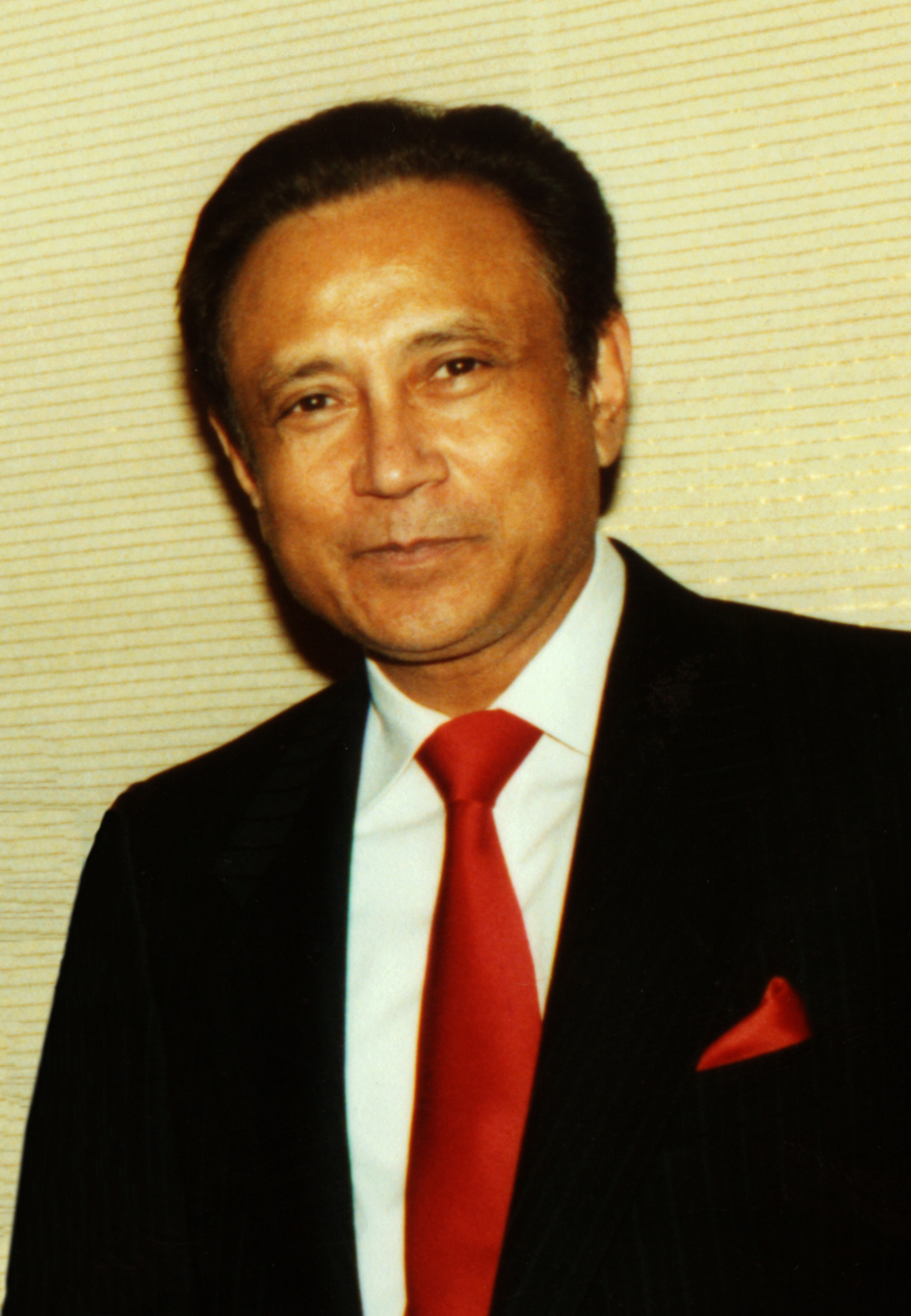
- Mani L. Bhaumik
- Born: 30 March 1931 (age 95); Tamluk, Bengal Presidency, British India (now Tamluk, West Bengal, India)
- Citizenship: United States
- Education: University of Calcutta (BSc, MSc); IIT Kharagpur (PhD)
- Awards: Padma Shri (2011)
- Scientific career
- Fields: Physics
- Workplaces: University of California, Los Angeles; California State University, Long Beach
- Academic advisors: Satyendranath Bose

Mani Lal Bhaumik (born 30 March 1931) is an Indian American physicist and an internationally bestselling author, celebrated lecturer, entrepreneur and philanthropist.

== Early life ==
Mani Lal Bhaumik was born in a Bengali Mahishya family on 30 March 1931 in a small village in Tamluk and attended the Kola Union High School. His father Gunodhar Bhaumik was a notable freedom fighter. As a teenager, Bhaumik spent some time with Mahatma Gandhi in his Mahisadal camp. In his boyhood Mani Lal was hugely influenced by freedom fighter Matangini Hazra, popularly known as Old Lady Gandhi.

He received a B.Sc. degree from Scottish Church College and an M.Sc. degree from the Rajabazar Science College campus of University of Calcutta. He won the attention of Satyendra Nath Bose (creator of the Bose–Einstein statistics) who encouraged his prodigious curiosity. Bhaumik became the first student to receive a doctorate from the Indian Institute of Technology Kharagpur when he received his Ph.D. degree in quantum physics in 1958. His thesis was on Resonant Electronic Energy Transfers, a subject he would have cause to use in his work with lasers.

== Scientific career ==
Receiving a Sloan Foundation Fellowship in 1959, Bhaumik went to the University of California Los Angeles (UCLA) for a position as postdoctoral researcher. In 1961, he joined the Quantum Electronics Division at Xerox Electro-Optical Systems in Pasadena and began his career as a laser scientist. Concurrently, he taught Quantum physics and Astronomy at the California State University at Long Beach. In 1968, he was enlisted by the Northrop Corporate Research Laboratory, where he rose to become the director of the Laser Technology Laboratory and led a team that made pioneering contributions in research on excimer laser technology. One of the papers on this research was presented at the Denver, Colorado meeting of the Optical Society of America in March 1973. At this meeting, Bhaumik presented substantial evidence to demonstrate for the first time that an excimer laser could be efficient and powerful enough for practical utilization. The application of excimer lasers in Lasik eye surgery has resulted in vision correction in many cases. Excimer Laser is also used for difficult-to-treat skin diseases including psoriasis and vitiligo. The most widespread application of excimer laser has been in photolithography, a critical technology used in the manufacturing of microelectronic devices like cell phones. His contributions to the development of new and high power lasers merited his election by his peers to be a fellow of both the American Physical Society and the Institute of Electrical and Electronics Engineers.

Bhaumik's current interest is performing innovative theoretical physics research in deciphering the century old enigma of quantum physics as well as sharing with the public the advances in quantum physics and cosmology and their implications for our lives, work, technology, and spiritual development. This he endeavors to do through books such as the Code Name God and The Cosmic Detective, articles, lectures, and TV programs like the Cosmic Quantum Ray. He is also interested in research on the origin and the nature of consciousness and how that knowledge can be utilized in improving the quality of our existence. In 1989 his rags to reaches life story was featured in the popular TV series Lifestyles of the Rich and Famous, distributed by Paramount Pictures.

Bhaumik has published over a hundred papers in various professional journals and is a holder of a dozen laser-related U.S. patents. He has been invited to lecture all over the world, at forums including: Summer School on High-Power Gas Lasers, Capri, Italy 1975; International Symposium on Gas-Flow and Chemical Lasers, Belgium 1978; International Symposium on Gas Discharge Lasers, Grenoble, France 1979; Asoke Sarkar Memorial Lecture, Calcutta International Book Fair 2001; Institute of Culture, Calcutta, India 2006; Kolkata Society for Asian Studies, Kolkata, India 2015. At the invitation from the government of India Bhaumik delivered a lecture at the Science Festival 2020.

== Books, media, and philanthropic activities ==
His search spanned a decade and led him to the inference that the One Source at the hub of all spiritual traditions is grounded in scientific reality and not a mere creation of blind faith. He also argues that science and spirituality are indeed two sides of the same coin, the coin being that unique human consciousness that allows us to perceive both ourselves and objective reality. Therefore, he argues in his book Code Name God (Crossroads Publishing), the big divide between science and spirituality can be bridged. The trick, Bhaumik asserts, is to see things in an entirely new light–a light shed upon by the recent revelations of quantum physics and cosmology. He now devotes much of his time and energy to bringing this message to the public, including its younger members, for whom he has recently published The Cosmic Detective (Penguin 2008), a primer on cosmology, and created an award-winning animated television series, Cosmic Quantum Ray, which air on the Hub Network and many other networks worldwide.

Bhaumik has instituted an annual International Award through the UCLA Neuropsychiatry Institute to acknowledge the best scientific evidence demonstrating the effect of mind in healing. He has been involved in numerous community activities through his association with the Los Angeles Bombay Sister City Association; the Los Angeles St. Petersburg Sister City association; the Long Beach Calcutta sister City Association and others. He has donated to various charitable organizations including the Thalians of Los Angeles. He also established the Bhaumik Educational Foundation, based in Kolkata, which provides full scholarships to needy but brilliant students who wish to apply themselves to studies in science and technology. In 2016 he also made an $11 million gift to UCLA to establish an Institute of Theoretical Physics. He has also established AAAS Mani L. Bhaumik Award for Public Engagement with Science awarded to international contributors.

== Spiritual views ==
=== Code Name: God ===
First published in the U.S. in 2005, Code Name God (Crossroads Publishing ISBN 0-8245-2519-1) is a distillation of Bhaumik's central thesis that the discoveries of modern physics can be reconciled with the great truths of the world religions when those truths are viewed as elements of what Aldous Huxley called "The Perennial Philosophy." In particular, Bhaumik finds strong support in advanced physics and cosmology for the Neo-Platonic notion of "the One" (identified here as "The Source"), and conjectures that this existential source may reside in what is known as the quantum vacuum state and be in some manner co-eternal and co-equal with human consciousness. The book and its premise have been praised by luminaries of both the literary and scientific words, including Alexander Solzhenitsyn, who wrote, "This example of a personal spiritual growth ... and re-evaluation of material values ... arouses very warm feelings. God is one and there are no major differences between religions." Fritjof Capra, author of The Tao of Physics, wrote "... the attempt to find common ground between Eastern spirituality and Western science is eloquently told and makes for fascinating reading."

Code Name God is both an autobiography, chronicling significant events in its author's life in tandem with the revelations that accompanied them, and a contemplation on the astounding implications of quantum physics. In the author's words, "the surprising discovery of quantum physics that the primary source of everything in the universe is present in each minutest stitch of the fabric of space of this immensely vast cosmos empowers us to ponder the One Source of all creation. It is not merely a blind faith anymore. This ought to enable us to feel ourselves as an inextricable part of the One Source, which would significantly improve the quality of our lives." The book, which has enjoyed considerable success in Bhaumik's native India, has also drawn plaudits from recognized European scientists such as Professor Walter Thirring, the former director and head of the theory division at CERN, Geneva, who asserts in the foreword to its German edition, "Dr. Bhaumik's portrayal of a higher power embedded in the fabric of the universe and responsible for its continuing existence and operation is consistent with his reliance on the highly technical and mathematical intricacies of the Quantum Field Theory, an area of study to which I had the opportunity of making some significant contributions." Thirring and Bhaumik are among a still relatively small group of "hard scientists" who have openly acknowledged the spiritual implications of quantum physics and cosmology.

=== The Cosmic Detective ===
Published in 2009 by Penguin (ISBN 9780143330691), The Cosmic Detective is a primer on modern cosmology for the general but scientifically inclined reader. It was selected as an official book by the secretariat of the International Year of Astronomy (IYA2009) declared by the UN General Assembly. The slogan of IYA2009 was "THE UNIVERSE -YOURS TO DISCOVER," an exhortation for us to reevaluate our place in it in light of the revolutionary discoveries of modern cosmology. The presentation of the discoveries of modern cosmology in this book has been praised by experts as well as others interested in the field. Catherine Cesarsky, President of the International Astronomical Union states,"The Cosmic Detective is an inspirational read. Bhaumik tackles topics with impressive scope, yet delves into them with spirit rarely seen. Marrying scientifically accurate text with accessible language is no easy task, but The Cosmic Detective is a proof that it can be done." Walter Thirring, the former head of the theory division at CERN, Geneva, has said, "The Cosmic Detective reveals another of Mani Bhaumik's talents: he is an outstanding science writer to complement his demonstrated scientific insight. He has the unique ability to distill from the voluminous material the essential concepts for the general public." Apollo 14 Astronaut Edgar Mitchell, in his foreword to the book, writes, "Mani Bhaumik builds on recent developments in science to bring us new pictures, larger views and insights about the magnificence of our universe." The book has been published in seven languages.

== Books in Bengali ==
- Bishwa Jeebani: Biography of the Universe (ISBN 81-7756-660-1): Ananda Publishers, Kolkata, 2007
- Bijñāne Ishwarer Sanket (ISBN 81-7756-924-4, ISBN 978-81-7756-924-7): Translation of Codename God, released in 2010
- Brahma Satya Jagat Satya : Upanishad-Bijñān-Rabindranath (ISBN 978-93-5040-131-6): Ananda Publishers, Kolkata, 2012

The title of the book means "Brahman and the Universe – Both are true", which runs counter to the ninth century edict of the Hindu spiritual leader Śaṅkarāchārya in his famous poem Vivekachudamani:

Ślokārdhena pravakshyāmi yaduktaṃ granthakoṭibhiḥ
Brahma satya jaganmithyā jīvoḥ brahmaiva nāparaḥ

Translation:

I'll tell in one line what is told in millions of books:
Brahman is true, universe is false; the living soul is Brahman alone, no other else.

This book topped the bestseller list of the Anandabazar Patrika in the non-fiction category.

- Ami Naren: Bideshe Vivekananda (ISBN 978-81-8374-188-0): Patra Bharati Pablisher, Kolkata, February, 2013

On the bestseller list of the Anandabazar Patrika, February 15, 2013

- Hello Einstein: Chena Nam Achena Galpa (ISBN 978-93-5040-380-8): Ananda Pablisher, Kolkata 2014

On the bestseller list of the Anandabazar Patrika, March 15, 2014

== Honors and awards ==
- Elected fellow of the American Physical Society, 1976.
- Elected fellow of the Institute of Electrical and Electronics Engineers for development of high power lasers and new laser systems, 1982.
- Received honorary D.Sc. for lifetime academic achievement in 1995 from Indian Institute of Technology Kharagpur
- Received Mahatma Gandhi Humanitarian Award, 2005, from the Indian American Heritage Foundation
- Received Pravasi Bharatiya Samman, one of the most prestigious civilian awards given by the Government of India to honor an exceptionally successful and meritorious Indian residing abroad for his extraordinary contribution, 2010
- Received the prestigious Padma Shri Award 2011 from Government of India for distinguished service in science and engineering.
- Received Chaudhuri Award for extraordinary achievements in science by California Institute of Integral Studies, San Francisco, May 4, 2013.
- UCLA Established Mani L. Bhaumik Institute for Theoretical Physics in 2016.
- Received UCLA Physical Sciences Centennial Visionary Award in 2021.
