= Alien TV =

- Genre: Comedy
- Created by: Ian Brown
- Developed by: Doug Hadders; Adam Rotstein
- Directed by: Ian Brown
- Voices of: Robert Tinkler; Julie Lemieux; John Cleland; Kyle Dooley; Rupert Degas
- Theme music composer: Russell Thornton; Gabriel Winterfield
- Composers: Igor Correia; Jeff Milutinovic
- Countries of origin: Canada; Australia
- Original language: English
- No. of series: 2
- No. of episodes: 26 (78 segments)

Production
- Executive producers: Olivier Dumont; Randi Yaffa; Carmel Travers; Adam Rotstein; Doug Hadders
- Producers: Carmel Travers; Tristan Homer
- Running time: 24 minutes
- Production companies: Entertainment One; Pop Family Entertainment; Snowball Studios

Original release
- Network: Netflix; 9Go!
- Release: November 23, 2019 – March 19, 2021

Alien TV is a live action/CG animation television series produced by Entertainment One and Pop Family Entertainment for Netflix. The plot revolves around a television news crew consisting of the extraterrestrials Ixbee, Pixbee and Squee, who are sent to learn about the planet Earth, where they attempt to make sense of humans and their hobbies.

The series premiered on the Nine Network's multichannel 9Go! in Australia on 23 November 2019. A second season was released March 19, 2021 on Netflix. There are no plans for a season 3.

== Cast ==
- Robert Tinkler as Ixbee
- Julie Lemieux as Pixbee
- John Cleland as Squee
- Kyle Dooley as Squood
- Rupert Degas as Translator

== Episodes ==
=== Series overview ===
Season	Episodes	Originally released
1	13	August 21, 2020
2	13	September 9, 2021

=== Season 1 (2020) ===
No. overall	No. in season	Title	Directed by	Written by	Storyboard by	Original release date
1	1a	"Bicycle"	Ian Brown	Doug Hadders & Adam Rotstein	Tom Nesbitt	August 21, 2020
The aliens have to deal with a bicycle on Earth. In the end, they get injured.
2	1b	"Gymnastics"	Ian Brown	Jeff Sager	Steve Moltzen	August 21, 2020
Now would you look at that? The aliens doing gymnastics for the first time!
3	1c	"Camping"	Ian Brown	Brian Hartigan	Tony Tulipano	August 21, 2020
For us humans, camping is just an average summer activity, but it's a whole different thing for Ixbee, Pixbee and Squee.
4	2a	"Playground"	Ian Brown	Shawn Kalb	Mark Appleby	August 21, 2020
Look at that, who knew those rides at the playground were also used as equipment for astronauts?
5	2b	"Art"	Ian Brown	Cleon Prineas	Mark Appleby	August 21, 2020
At the Louvre, the aliens try to find the perfect picture as a keepsake.
6	2c	"Gum"	Ian Brown	Laurie Elliott	Brad Ferguson	August 21, 2020
The aliens take bubblegum to the next level when they find it in a public park.
7	3a	"Gym"	Ian Brown	Bruce Griffiths	Ivan Evans	August 21, 2020
A trip to the gym goes wrong...
8	3b	"Birthday"	Ian Brown	Laurie Elliott	Mark Gravas & Mark Appleby	August 21, 2020
Looks like birthdays are the best thing ever existed on Earth according to our alien friends.
9	3c	"Restaurant"	Ian Brown	Bruce Griffiths	Mark Appleby	August 21, 2020
The aliens dine inside a restaurant but are horrified that they serve snails.
10	4a	"BBQ"	Ian Brown	Simon Dodd	Mark Appleby	August 21, 2020
The aliens go and rescue "alien" sausages from a human barbecue.
11	4b	"Office"	Ian Brown	Simon Dodd	Mark Appleby	August 21, 2020
The aliens check out the "rides" and "attractions" in office rooms.
12	4c	"Halloween"	Ian Brown	Jennifer Daley	Don Spencer	August 21, 2020
On Halloween, the aliens are mistaken for kids going trick-or-treating and get a lot of yummy delicious candy.
13	5a	"Pizza"	Ian Brown	Laurie Elliott	Lisa Whittick	August 21, 2020
The aliens craft their very own pizza to replace a broken Frisbee.
14	5b	"Magic"	Ian Brown	Laurie Elliott	Ivan Evans	August 21, 2020
The aliens try to mimic magic tricks to substitute teleportation.
15	5c	"Cleaning"	Ian Brown	Bruce Griffiths	Ivan Evans	August 21, 2020
The aliens pick up the idea of cleanliness and try to apply it in their own spaceship.
16	6a	"Arcade"	Ian Brown	Jennifer Daley	Mark Appleby	August 21, 2020
The aliens go on a wacky journey in an arcade on Earth.
17	6b	"Dumplings"	Ian Brown	Simon Dodd	Ivan Evans	August 21, 2020
The aliens get a taste of Chinese cuisine accompanied by a live lobster.
18	6c	"Presents"	Ian Brown	Doug Hadders & Adam Rotstein	Tony Tulipano	August 21, 2020
The aliens are assigned to bring Squood the ideal gift.
19	7a	"Junkyard"	Ian Brown	Brian Hartigan	Katie Shanahan	August 21, 2020
A trip to a junkyard goes wrong.
20	7b	"Spa"	Ian Brown	Jeff Sager	Tom Nesbitt	August 21, 2020
The aliens go to what they think is a restaurant (which is actually a spa) to practice some cooking.
21	7c	"Love"	Ian Brown	Thomas Duncan-Watt	Ivan Evans	August 21, 2020
Ixbee tries to learn about love when he falls in love with a cockroach.
22	8a	"Movie"	Ian Brown	Jennifer Daley	Lisa Whittick	August 21, 2020
A trip to the movie theatre with the aliens goes wrong.
23	8b	"Kindergarten"	Ian Brown	Simon Dodd	Mark Appleby	August 21, 2020
The aliens' trip to the kindergarten becomes harder than they thought.
24	8c	"Sick"	Ian Brown	Shawn Kalb	Tony Tulipano	August 21, 2020
Ixbee gets the flu.
25	9a	"Baby"	Ian Brown	Cleon Prineas	Mark Appleby	August 21, 2020
The aliens have to play babysitters when they take care of a crying baby doll who annoys and drives them nuts. Annoyed by the doll's constant crying, The aliens then send the doll to someone who got scared of it.
26	9b	"Supermarket"	Ian Brown	Shawn Kalb	Don Spencer	August 21, 2020
The aliens turn a trip at the supermarket into mass mayhem.
27	9c	"Tea"	Ian Brown	Naomi Jardine	Mark Appleby	August 21, 2020
The aliens discover tea while visiting the United Kingdom.
28	10a	"Wedding"	Ian Brown	Kyle Dooley	Shawnee Dunn	August 21, 2020
The aliens go to (crash) a wedding. Who invited them anyway?
29	10b	"Loch Ness"	Ian Brown	Simon Dodd	Mark Appleby	August 21, 2020
The aliens discover Loch Ness and bagpipes on their trip to Scotland, They even meet The Loch Ness Monster.
30	10c	"Soccer"	Ian Brown	Doug Hadders & Adam Rotstein	Tom Nesbitt	August 21, 2020
The aliens discover the true meaning of soccer to get their kicks on the soccer field.
31	11a	"Skateboard"	Ian Brown	Cleon Prineas	Mark Appleby	August 21, 2020
The aliens make skateboards more awesome by making them fly sky-high!
32	11b	"Mannequin"	Ian Brown	Shawn Kalb	Tom Nesbitt	August 21, 2020
The aliens find an old mannequin in the dumpster.
33	11c	"Survival"	Ian Brown	Jeff Sager	Mark Appleby	August 21, 2020
For our aliens, a visit to Australia and survival is harder than they thought.
34	12a	"Toyshop"	Ian Brown	Cleon Prineas	Katie Shanahan	August 21, 2020
The aliens have an exciting day of fun in a toy store on Planet Earth.
35	12b	"Laundromat"	Ian Brown	Bruce Griffiths	Mark Appleby	August 21, 2020
The aliens find out that a laundromat is more fun that you thought it was.
36	12c	"Yoga"	Ian Brown	Jennifer Daley	Shawnee Dunn	August 21, 2020
The aliens discover the wonders of calmness when they try out yoga!
37	13a	"Santa"	Ian Brown	Jeff Sager	Tom Nesbitt	August 21, 2020
It's Christmas and the aliens go on a fun journey to try to find the Christmas main attraction, Santa Claus.
38	13b	"Trophy"	Ian Brown	Jeff Sager	Tony Tulipano	August 21, 2020
Let's see if the aliens will win this ice hockey match.
39	13c	"Makeup"	Ian Brown	Charlotte Rose Hamlyn	Mark Appleby	August 21, 2020
The aliens try out makeup for a new style.

=== Season 2 (2021) ===
No. overall	No. in season	Title	Directed by	Written by	Storyboard by	Original release date
40	1a	"Trains"	Ian Brown	Naomi Jardine	Tom Nesbitt	March 19, 2021
When the two opposing alien teams shrink down, they have a classic Wallace and Gromit-style fight on some toy trains, and a Godzilla-style fight.
41	1b	"Barbershop"	Ian Brown	Jerome Simpson	Brad Ferguson	March 19, 2021
Squee and Pixbee give Ixbee give a really floral haircut at the barbershop.
42	1c	"Gnome"	Ian Brown	Bruce Griffiths	Shawnee Dunn	March 19, 2021
The aliens take a garden gnome around the capital of Britain, London, hoping it will talk for their report.
43	2a	"Florist"	Ian Brown	Jennifer Daley	Mark Appleby	March 19, 2021
The aliens' trip to the florist doesn't go to plan.
44	2b	"Fashion"	Ian Brown	Naomi Jardine	Mark Appleby	March 19, 2021
The aliens try out Fashion - but their fashion doesn’t go to plan!
45	2c	"Teeth"	Ian Brown	Jeff Sager	Mark Appleby	March 19, 2021
Ixbee is scared of dentists, so they try out Teeth.
46	3a	"Pool"	Ian Brown	Jennifer Daley	Mark Appleby	March 19, 2021
When the aliens discover a swimming pool, They become pirates. pirates love swimming pools too.
47	3b	"Dinner Party"	Ian Brown	Kyle Dooley	Mark Appleby	March 19, 2021
The aliens give Squoog the best dinner party he had in his life!
48	3c	"Skiing"	Ian Brown	Jerome Simpson	Mark Appleby	March 19, 2021
The aliens go to Switzerland to discover skiing - but their skiing doesn’t go to plan!
49	4a	"Joke Shop"	Ian Brown	Naomi Jardine	Brad Ferguson	March 19, 2021
Knock, knock. Who's there? Ixbee, Pixbee and Squee! The aliens go to the Palace of Laughter, A joke shop on Planet Earth. They need to try to find things to make Squoog laugh.
50	4b	"Outback"	Ian Brown	Simon Dodd	Tom Nesbitt	March 19, 2021
Why, g'day there! Welcome to Australia, my new alien besties! The aliens visit the outback of Australia.
51	4c	"Fire Hall"	Ian Brown	Jennifer Daley	Francisco Avalos	March 19, 2021
At the fire station, The aliens visit doesn’t go to plan!
52	5a	"Baby Shower"	Ian Brown	Jerome Simpson	Brad Ferguson	March 19, 2021
The aliens create a baby shower! - with a tummy full of bubble tea?
53	5b	"Yard Sale"	Ian Brown	Jeff Sager	Francisco Avalos	March 19, 2021
The alien trio make a yard sale 10 times more funner than a Martian on the planet Amusementparkia!
54	5c	"Aquarium"	Ian Brown	Jennifer Daley	Tom Nesbitt	March 19, 2021
Ixbee, Pixbee and Squee mistake an aquarium for a beach and make close friends with the swelling fish, pufferfish.
55	6a	"Dance"	Ian Brown	Jerome Simpson	Brad Ferguson	March 19, 2021
Breakdancing? The Monster Mash? How about square dancing? What dancing style will the aliens choose? The aliens demonstrates some dance moves - but their routine doesn’t go to plan!
56	6b	"International Games"	Ian Brown	Kyle Dooley	Francisco Avalos	March 19, 2021
The aliens visit the International Games.
57	6c	"Shopping"	Ian Brown	Jeff Sager	Tom Nesbitt	March 19, 2021
The aliens take shopping to the next level when they go shopping - again! (This time, It's not the supermarket.)
58	7a	"School"	Ian Brown	Kyle Dooley	Mark Appleby	March 19, 2021
Upon arriving at the empty classroom of a school on Earth, the two teams of alien reporters try their hand at various school subjects.
59	7b	"Holiday"	Ian Brown	Gina Roncoli; Bruce Griffiths	Mark Appleby	March 19, 2021
Bumper cars, roller coasters and waterslides, all of these come to mind when we think of summer holidays, but as always the aliens managed to make the mission not go to plan!
60	7c	"Lucha Libre"	Ian Brown	Jerome Simpson	Mark Appleby	March 19, 2021
The aliens arrive in Mexico and have a lucha libre match against the other team of reporters.
61	8a	"Car"	Ian Brown	Jeff Sager	Tom Nesbitt	March 19, 2021
The aliens "borrow" a bumper car from the carnival to take a driving test.
62	8b	"Sleep"	Ian Brown	Jeff Sager	Brad Ferguson	March 19, 2021
Ixbee gets insomnia and his friends try everything to send him to sleep: a perfect bed, some comfy pillows and a nice bedtime story, and a sweet dream.
63	8c	"Golf"	Ian Brown	Kyle Dooley	Francisco Avalos	March 19, 2021
The aliens mistake a golf ball for a bird's egg that is about to hatch.
64	9a	"Airplane"	Ian Brown	Naomi Jardine	Francisco Avalos	March 19, 2021
The aliens test out a simulator to feel what it is like to be on an airplane.
65	9b	"Water Park"	Ian Brown	Jeff Sager	Brad Ferguson	March 19, 2021
Ixbee, Pixbee and Squee make their own water park!
66	9c	"Mail"	Ian Brown	Jeff Sager	Tom Nesbitt	March 19, 2021
The aliens try delivering letters and packages around town.
67	10a	"Music"	Ian Brown	Cleon Prineas	Mark Appleby	March 19, 2021
The alien trio makes music together.
68	10b	"Bowling"	Ian Brown	Brian Hartigan	Mark Appleby	March 19, 2021
The aliens visit a funky bowling alley
69	10c	"Gardening"	Ian Brown	Bruce Griffiths	Mark Appleby	March 19, 2021
The aliens spend a little time experimenting with plants.
70	11a	"Museum"	Ian Brown	Jeff Sager	Mark Appleby	March 19, 2021
If the aliens need to navigate in a really large and maze-like museum in France, they may need to use a compass or ask the tour guide.
71	11b	"Bollywood"	Ian Brown	Naomi Jardine	Mark Appleby	March 19, 2021
The aliens go to a movie studio to discover how it feels like to be in a Bollywood movie.
72	11c	"Castle"	Ian Brown	Jerome Simpson	Mark Appleby	March 19, 2021
The two opposing alien teams have a medieval battle to conquer a bouncy castle on Earth.
73	12a	"Ballet"	Ian Brown	Jennifer Daley	Mark Appleby	March 19, 2021
The aliens have a awesome ballet and karate party!
74	12b	"Energy"	Ian Brown	Cleon Prineas	Mark Appleby	March 19, 2021
The aliens have trouble producing energy for their spaceship to go green.
75	12c	"Leprechauns"	Ian Brown	Naomi Jardine	Mark Appleby	March 19, 2021
The aliens arrive in Ireland to go on a special St. Patrick's Day quest to search for the mythical leprechaun.
76	13a	"Glasses"	Ian Brown	Kyle Dooley	Alex Greychuck	March 19, 2021
Ixbee's eyesight is becoming poorly, what should they do? They get this guy some glasses, Awesome!
77	13b	"Trial"	Ian Brown	Jerome Simpson	Tom Nesbitt	March 19, 2021
The aliens have a trial that is being hold over a stolen piece of the delicious treat, cake.
78	13c	"Scary"	Ian Brown	Naomi Jardine	Brad Ferguson	March 19, 2021
Squood sends the aliens a fear-measuring device to discover the various sources of fear. They find a creepy baby doll, Jason Voorhees masks, cockroaches, and killer clowns, etc. Note: This episode is the series finale of Alien TV.

== Production ==
Development on Alien TV have been announced on 30 September 2013 during Essential Media and Entertainment's MIPCOM state, when Essential Media & Entertainment partnered with Canadian film & television production/distribution studio Entertainment One via its kids & family brands division eOne Family, to produce an animated series about an Alien news crew's weird and wacky misinterpretation of life on Earth, entitled Alien TV, Ian Brown would serve as the creator of the series while Essential Media & Entertainment's head of childrens Carmel Travers and eOne Family mamaging director & present Olivier Dumont would serve as executive producers of the series.

By September 2017 during production of Alien TV and when co-producer Essential Media and Entertainment entered a restructure that led to its head of children's entertainment Carmel Travers, Carmel Travers have established a new Australian independent kids & family entertainment production company Pop Family Entertainment and had taken over Essential Media & Entertainment's kids & family production state including Alien TV.
