= Pirate Express =

- Genre: Action; Comedy; Adventure
- Created by: Mathieu DeLaPorte; Boris Guillitoeu; Alexis Bacci-Leville; Romain Van Liemt; Alexandre De La Patelliérre
- Developed by: Rob Davies
- Written by: Thomas Duncan-Watt; Alexis Bacci-Leville; Bruce Griffiths; Cleon Prineas; Ian Boothby; Brendan Luno; Michael Drake
- Directed by: Dave Woodgate
- Theme music composer: Ian James Corlett; Hoot Gibson
- Opening theme: "Pirate Express" performed by Scott McNeil
- Composer: Hal Beckett
- Countries of origin: Canada; Australia
- Original language: English
- No. of seasons: 1
- No. of episodes: 26

Production
- Executive producers: Trevor Bentley; Mauro Casalese; Rob Davies; Rob Simmons; Donna Andrews; Stu Connolly; Jo Rooney; Andy Ryan
- Producers: Donna Andrews; Stu Connolly; Rob Simmons
- Editors: Matthew Sipple; David Tindale
- Production companies: Atomic Cartoons; Sticky Pictures

Original release
- Network: Teletoon (Canada); 9Go! (Australia)
- Release: 26 April – 30 April 2015

Pirate Express is an animated series that is a co-production between Atomic Cartoons in Canada and Sticky Pictures in Australia. The series aired for only one week in April 2015 on Teletoon. It hasn't aired on the channel since its premiere week. In Australia, the series debuted on 9Go! on July 4, 2015. 26 episodes were produced.

== Synopsis ==
300 years ago, Captain LaPoutine and his crew, Armando, Burt, Booli and Spewey tried to steal a princess' tiara, but accidentally stole Poseidon's underwear instead. This angered Poseidon and made him shrink the pirates and imprison them in a bottle. In the present day, the pirates are accidentally released by his younger son, Newt. Newt decides to take control of the pirates and go on adventures with them.

== Cast ==
- James Higuchi as Newt
- Lee Tockar as Captain LaPoutine
- Alessandro Juliani as Armando, Charon, Johnnie Bermuda
- Matt Cowlrick as Burt
- Doron Bell as Booli
- Ian James Corlett as Poseidon, Gordon, Geoffrey
- Dee Jay Jackson as Zeus
- Garry Chalk as Ted
- Kelly Sheridan as Marie Celeste
- Scott McNeil as Hades
- Colin Murdock as Skulldidgery
- Trevor Devall as Davy Jones

== Production ==
Pirate Express was picked up for development by Teletoon in 2011. Originally, the show was set to be a Canada-France co-production between Atomic Cartoons and Ellipsanime, with episodes expected to be finished by March 2012. In July 2013, the series was officially greenlit for production, but with Australia's Sticky Pictures replacing Ellipsanime as a co-production partner. It was then set for a fall 2014 debut on Teletoon and Nine Network in Australia. Ultimately, the show would launch in both markets in 2015.

== Reception ==
At the 2015 Leo Awards, Pirate Express received the Best Musical Score award and a Best Animated Series nomination.

== Episodes ==
No. overall	No. in season	Title	Original release date
1	1	"Poseidon or Bust/Finders Keepers"	26 April 2015
2	2	"Little Miss Swordshine/Ship Wretched"	26 April 2015
3	3	"Turkey Leg of Doom/Hair of the God"	26 April 2015
4	4	"Enter the Octogod/Dead Men Wear Plaid"	26 April 2015
5	5	"Bilge Rat Zombies/Ghost of Ships Passed"	26 April 2015
6	6	"Night of the Geminis/Ships and Salsa"	26 April 2015
7	7	"All A Bored/Club Fed"	26 April 2015
8	8	"White Wedding/Saltiest Dogs"	26 April 2015
9	9	"Shrieking Violet/Starboard Struck"	26 April 2015
10	10	"Get Kraken/Grill of My Dreams"	26 April 2015
11	11	"Penguin Law/Shop 'til You Drop Anchor"	26 April 2015
12	12	"Opposites Ahoy/Udder Chaos"	27 April 2015
13	13	"Out of Key/Thumb Wars"	27 April 2015
14	14	"One Flew Over the Crow's Nest/Game On"	27 April 2015
15	15	"Licence to Thrill/Beast in Show"	28 April 2015
16	16	"Fine Feathered Fiend/Lumber Jerk"	28 April 2015
17	17	"Father Time/Manure Overload"	28 April 2015
18	18	"No Sea for Old Salts/Sealed Fate"	29 April 2015
19	19	"Blunder Down Under/Engaged in Battle"	29 April 2015
20	20	"Beggars Can't Be Cruisers/Voyage of the Edam-ed"	29 April 2015
21	21	"Greeced Lightning/The Godd Couple"	30 April 2015
22	22	"Gordon's Fish Tale/Love on the Rocks"	30 April 2015
23	23	"Malaise of the One Eye/The Future Is Now"	30 April 2015
24	24	"Booty Camp/Put Another Captain's Log on the Fire"	27 April 2015
25	25	"Booty Nights/Fountain of Misspent Youth"	28 April 2015
26	26	"Jungle Booty Part 1/Jungle Booty Part 2"	29 April 2015

== International broadcast ==
In the United Kingdom, the series aired on Kix. In South East Asia, Pirate Express debuted on Disney XD on September 5, 2015.
