= Cosmic Quantum Ray =

Animated television series

- Created by: Mani Bhaumik
- Directed by: Andrew Young; Arnaud Bouron; Ji Hoon Son
- Voices of: Tom Kenny; Samuel Vincent; Colin Murdock; Ashleigh Ball; Pauline Newstone; Richard Ian Cox; Matt Hill; Cathy Weseluck
- Countries of origin: United States; Germany; Canada; France; Ireland; South Korea
- Original language: English
- No. of seasons: 1
- No. of episodes: 26

Production
- Executive producers: Mike Young; Bill Schultz; Liz Young; Marc Gabizon; Sebastian Debertin; Paul Cummins; Aton Soumache; Alexis Vonarb; Jae Soo Cho; Young Cheol Yoon; Mani Bhaumik; Tatiana Chekhova; Niraj Bhukhanwala; Ronald D'Mello
- Producers: Peter Anderson Andrew Young Pamela Hickey Dennys McCoy Romain Van Liemt Cédric Pilot Siobhán Ní Ghadhra Young Cheol Yoon
- Running time: 22 minutes
- Production companies: Mike Young Productions; Method Animation; Cosmotoons; Ocean Productions; Europool; Telegael; SK C&C; Independence Creative; Maya Entertainment

Original release
- Network: Animania HD/The Hub
- Release: November 7, 2007 – 2008

Cosmic Quantum Ray is an animated television series. The series premiered in the United States on November 7, 2007, on Animania HD, then in 2009 in Germany on KI.KA, and then later on October 10, 2010, on The Hub. It also aired on Science Channel as part of a sneak peek of the latter.

== Synopsis ==
The story centers on teenager Robbie Shipton, who possesses a shoe box leading to the Ninth Dimension, the home of Quantum Ray. Robbie joins Team Quantum, a team of heroes responsible for stopping the many antagonists of the show, such as Professor Evil Brainhead and his hamster mother-figure named Mother, from carrying out their plans. He also attends school in the ordinary dimension, and occasionally characters from the two dimensions end up meeting with each other.

== Production ==
Although produced by Germany's KI.KA and France's M6, the show was written in English, the writing supervised by head writers/co-producers and Emmy winners Pamela Hickey and Dennys McCoy. In 2009, the series beat out Nickelodeon, Disney and Cartoon Network to win the Pulcinella Award for Best TV Series. The series was created by cosmologist Dr. Mani Bhaumik. Hickey and McCoy based all their stories on principles and theories from quantum physics, and Dr. Bhaumik provided the math. Cosmic Quantum Ray is a comedy/science-fiction adventure that, at the end of each episode, explains the quantum physics associated with a story and/or physical gags found within the series.

== Cast ==
- Ashleigh Ball – Allison
- Doron Bell – Lucas
- Richard Ian Cox – Chip Monahan
- Matt Hill – Scott
- Tom Kenny – Quantum Ray, Kronecker, Professor Evil Brainhead, Commander Fuzzy, Guy Gamma
- Colin Murdock – Bucketworth
- Pauline Newstone – Contessa De Worm
- Samuel Vincent – Robbie Shipton, Justin
- Cathy Weseluck – Mother Brainhead
- Chiara Zanni – Atee, Geecey

== Crew ==
- Mani Bhaumik – Creator, Executive Producer
- Tatiana Chekhova – Executive Producer
- Mike Young – Executive Producer
- Andrew Young – Director
- Arnaud Bouron – Co-Director (France)
- Karl Willems – Voice Director

== Episodes ==
1. Alison Attacks!
2. Sliptilicus
3. It Was Nothing!
4. What's Up With Gravity?
5. There's a Universe in Scott's Head!
6. Olga's Dish of Doom
7. Chip Monahan: Alien Squirrel Master!
8. What's a Bucketworth?
9. Me, Robot
10. Are We There Yet?
11. Un-Real Estate
12. Mr. Charm's Bad Vibration
13. Eat at Olga's
14. Alison's New Pet
15. Rings of Fire
16. Return of the Alien Squirrel Master
17. Hall of Fame
18. Here Today, Gone Yesterday
19. Pirates of the Dark Matter
20. Wild, Wild Wormhole
21. Let's Play a Game
22. Oh Mother, Where Art Thou?
23. Tangled Up in Twins
24. Cosmic Quantum... Robbie
25. The Incredible Shrinking Ray
26. Ms. Zooty's
