= Space Nova =

Animated television series

- Genre: Animation
- Written by: Thomas Duncan-Watt
- Directed by: Pablo de la Torre; Cindy Scharka; Gie Santos
- Composer: Russell Thornton
- Countries of origin: Australia; Malaysia; Germany
- Original language: English
- No. of seasons: 2
- No. of episodes: 27

Production
- Executive producers: Suzanne Ryan; Zeno Gabing; Arne Lohman; Jo Rooney; Andy Ryan; Kira Schneider; Lisa Albers; Libbie Doherty
- Producers: Suzanne Ryan; Juhaidah Joemin; Yasmin Jones
- Running time: 24 minutes
- Production companies: SLR Productions; Giggle Garage; Screen Australia; ZDF Enterprises

Original release
- Network: 9Go! ABC
- Release: 5 March 2021 – 2021

Space Nova is an animated science fiction television series developed and produced by SLR Productions and German distribution unit ZDF Studios for the Nine Network and Australian Broadcasting Corporation in Australia and Super RTL for Germany. The series first premiered on 9Go! on March 5, 2021 before premiering on Super RTL in October 21 of that year.

== Characters ==
=== Main ===
Jet Nova: Jet is a boy with blue hair. He sometimes do funny things. He is the sibling of Adelaide Nova.

Adelaide Nova: Adelaide is a girl. She is the sibling of Jet Nova.

Hugo Nova: Hugo is a man with also blue hair. He is the father of Jet and Adeline. He is the husband of Josie.

Josie Nova: Josie is a woman. She is the mother of Jet and Adeline. She is the wife of Hugo.

G9: G9 is a robot. It is the assistant of the Novas.

President Eredani: Eredani is the president of the Luna Port.

== Plot ==
Set in 2162, siblings Jet and Adelaide Nova live on an international space station with their Australian astronaut family. They attend school during the week, but on weekends they join their parents on exciting interstellar adventures, exploring planets, star hopping and discovering unknown life forms.

== Cast ==
- Zachary Fuller as Jet Nova
- Adelaide Tustian as Adelaide Nova
- Stephen James King as Hugo Nova
- Michelle Doake as Josie Nova
- Darren Sabadina as G9
- Rae Johnston as Janali Banks
- Ash Ricardo as Aubrina Eridani
- Christian Charisiou as Sol Erdani
- Jason Chong as Andy Ling
- Tim Harding as Avery Yu
- Mary Lascaris as Jennylyn Chu
- Angela Tran as Ziggy

== Production ==
The series was co-produced by Australia's SLR Productions and Malaysia's Giggle Garage with Germany's ZDF Studios handling worldwide distribution except Australia where it was handled by the Australian Children's Television Foundation.

The production received funding from Screen Australia and financial assistance from National Film Development Corporation Malaysia (FINAS). Voice director is Jo Boag and series director Pablo de la Torre, with Cindy Scharka and Gie Santos as episodic directors. The series is produced by Suzanne Ryan, Juhaidah Joemin, and Yasmin Jones. The head writer is multi-AWGIE Award-winner Thomas Duncan-Watt. The executive producers are Suzanne Ryan and Zeno Gabing.

== Release ==
Space Nova premiered on 9Go! in Australia on 5 March 2021. A full 13-episode marathon premiered on ABC ME on 2 April 2021, starting from 7:55am.

ABC ME and Powerhouse Museum in Sydney conducted a premiere screening of Space Nova on 7 April 2021 from 1–2PM at the Powerhouse Theatrette. The show also premiered in Singapore on Mediacorp's MeWATCH.

The 26-episode of 24-minute children's series screens on Nine, ABC, Super RTL and distributed globally by ZDF Enterprises.

== Awards ==
Year	Nominee	Award	Category	Result
2020	Thomas Duncan-Watt	AWGIE Awards	Animation	Won
2020	Charlotte Rose Hamlyn	AWGIE Awards	Animation	Nominated
2021	John Armstrong	AWGIE Awards	Animation	Won
2021	Melanie Alexander	AWGIE Awards	Animation	Nominated
2021	Thomas Duncan-Watt (for episode "Ghost Station")	AWGIE Awards	John Hinde Award for Excellence in Science-Fiction Writing	Won
2024	Charlotte Rose Hamlyn (for episode "Bread Nova")	AWGIE Awards	John Hinde Award for Excellence in Science-Fiction Writing	Nominated
