= Motown Magic =

Animated children's television series directed by Josh Wakely

- Genre: Animated; Children's; Urban fantasy
- Created by: Josh Wakely
- Directed by: Josh Wakely
- Opening theme: "ABC" performed by Zacary James and Motown Magic Cast
- Ending theme: "ABC" performed by Zacary James and Motown Magic Cast
- Composer: Bob Mothersbaugh
- Countries of origin: United States; Australia
- No. of seasons: 2
- No. of episodes: 51

Production
- Executive producers: Mikael Borglund; Josh Wakely
- Producer: Josh Wakely
- Editors: Adam Rainford; Daryl Davies
- Running time: 15 minutes
- Production companies: Grace – A Storytelling Company; Beyond Entertainment; Polygram Entertainment; EMI Music Publishing; Sony/ATV Music Publishing

Original release
- Network: Netflix (worldwide); 7TWO (Australia)
- Release: November 20, 2018 – June 28, 2019

Motown Magic is an animated children's television series, created by Josh Wakely, and produced for Netflix. The series follows Ben, described by Netflix as "a wide-eyed 8-year-old with a big heart and an amazing imagination", who uses a magic paintbrush to bring the street art in Motown to life. Wakely acquired worldwide rights from the music of Motown to feature in the series. The program features versions of songs by the popular record label, performed by contemporary recording artists and interwoven into the narrative. Motown hits that are recorded in the series are from such performers as The Jackson 5, Michael Jackson, The Temptations, Stevie Wonder, Marvin Gaye, The Supremes and Smokey Robinson & The Miracles.

The series was first made available worldwide on Netflix on November 20, 2018.

== Cast and characters ==
- Avia Fields as Ben
- Marissa Buccianti as Ella
- Betsy Kenney as Angie
- Monie Mon as Mickey
- Alex Thomas as Brad, Jimmy Mack
- Steven Cantor as Dancing Machine
- Rhonda Morman as Grandma Ruby
- Ryan Robinson as Grandpa Marvin
- Byron Marc Newsome as Uncle Rod
- Kelly Jean Badgley as Jenny, Stephanie, Mrs Hernandez
- Ingrid Nilson as Harmony
- Autumn Joy as Bernadette, Skywritter
- Amanuel Richards as Bill
- Peter Tiganis as Johnny
- Tessa VonderHaar as Nelly
- Lani Minella as Lorenzo
- Lauren Flans as Bonnie
- Marc Graue as Magical River
- AJ Hudson as Hunter
- Dustin Green as Skateboard
- Shawn Michael Howard as Clarence
- Michael Bearden as Doc Ellington

== Episodes ==
=== Series overview ===
Series overview
| Season | Episodes | Originally released |
|---|---|---|
| 1 | 25 | November 20, 2018 |
| 2 | 26 | June 28, 2019 |

=== Season 1 (2018) ===
| No. overall | No. in season | Title | Directed by | Written by | Original release date |
|---|---|---|---|---|---|
| 1 | 1 | "It's Easy as ABC" | Josh Wakely | John Armstrong | November 20, 2018 |
| 2 | 2 | "Dancing Machine" | Josh Wakely | Cleon Prineas | November 20, 2018 |
| 3 | 3 | "Jimmy Mack" | Josh Wakely | Joe Ansolabehere | November 20, 2018 |
| 4 | 4 | "My Girl" | Josh Wakely | Story by : Joe Ansolabehere; Written by : John Armstrong | November 20, 2018 |
| 5 | 5 | "Mickey's Monkey" | Josh Wakely | Erica Harrison | November 20, 2018 |
| 6 | 6 | "Happy Birthday" | Josh Wakely | Michael Carrington | November 20, 2018 |
| 7 | 7 | "Dancing in the Street" | Josh Wakely | Jennifer Skelly | November 20, 2018 |
| 8 | 8 | "Money (That’s What I Want)" | Josh Wakely | Cleon Prineas | November 20, 2018 |
| 9 | 9 | "Master Blaster" | Josh Wakely | Joe Ansolabehere and Cleon Prineas | November 20, 2018 |
| 10 | 10 | "I Can't Help Myself (Sugar Pie, Honey Bunch)" | Josh Wakely | Michael Carrington | November 20, 2018 |
| 11 | 11 | "Don't You Worry 'Bout a Thing" | Josh Wakely | Josh Mapleston | November 20, 2018 |
| 12 | 12 | "Ben" | Josh Wakely | Charlotte Rose Hamlyn | November 20, 2018 |
| 13 | 13 | "(Love Is Like a) Heatwave" | Josh Wakely | Jonathan Rosenthal and Charlotte Rose Hamlyn | November 20, 2018 |
| 14 | 14 | "War" | Josh Wakely | Henry "Hank" Jones | November 20, 2018 |
| 15 | 15 | "The Tracks of My Tears" | Josh Wakely | Charlotte Rose Hamlyn | July 24, 2023 |
| 16 | 16 | "Road Runner" | Josh Wakely | Doreen Spicer-Dannelly and Cleon Prineas | November 20, 2018 |
| 17 | 17 | "Smiling Faces Sometimes" | Josh Wakely | Henry "Hank" Jones | November 20, 2018 |
| 18 | 18 | "Twenty-Five Miles" | Josh Wakely | Cleon Prineas | November 20, 2018 |
| 19 | 19 | "Skywriter" | Josh Wakely | Erica Harrison | November 20, 2018 |
| 20 | 20 | "Runaway Child, Running Wild" | Josh Wakely | Denise Downer | November 20, 2018 |
| 21 | 21 | "Don't Mess with Bill" | Josh Wakely | Joe Ansolabehere and Cleon Prineas | November 20, 2018 |
| 22 | 22 | "Stop in the Name of Love" | Josh Wakely | Josh Mapleston | November 20, 2018 |
| 23 | 23 | "I Wish" | Josh Wakely | Henry "Hank" Jones | November 20, 2018 |
| 24 | 24 | "Ain't No Mountain High Enough" | Josh Wakely | Doreen Spicer-Dannelly and Cleon Prineas | November 20, 2018 |
| 25 | 25 | "For Once in My Life" | Josh Wakely | Jennifer Skelly | November 20, 2018 |

=== Season 2 (2019) ===
| No. overall | No. in season | Title | Directed by | Written by | Original release date |
|---|---|---|---|---|---|
| 26 | 1 | "I Heard It Through The Grapevine" | Josh Wakely | Charlotte Rose Hamlyn | June 28, 2019 |
| 27 | 2 | "Just My Imagination (Running Away with Me)" | Josh Wakely | Josh Mapleston | June 28, 2019 |
| 28 | 3 | "Superstition" | Josh Wakely | Charlotte Rose Hamlyn and Erica Harrison | June 28, 2019 |
| 29 | 4 | "How Funky Is Your Chicken" | Josh Wakely | Charlotte Rose Hamlyn and Cleon Prineas | June 28, 2019 |
| 30 | 5 | "Skate to the Rhythm" | Josh Wakely | Henry "Hank" Jones | June 28, 2019 |
| 31 | 6 | "My Guy" | Josh Wakely | Charlotte Rose Hamlyn | June 28, 2019 |
| 32 | 7 | "You've Really Got a Hold on Me" | Josh Wakely | Charlotte Rose Hamlyn | June 28, 2019 |
| 33 | 8 | "I Wish It Would Rain" | Josh Wakely | Josh Mapleston | June 28, 2019 |
| 34 | 9 | "Somebody's Watching Me" | Josh Wakely | Henry "Hank" Jones | June 28, 2019 |
| 35 | 10 | "Signed, Sealed, Delivered, I'm Yours" | Josh Wakely | Josh Mapleston | June 28, 2019 |
| 36 | 11 | "You Are the Sunshine of My Life" | Josh Wakely | Josh Mapleston | June 28, 2019 |
| 37 | 12 | "I'll Be Doggone" | Josh Wakely | Josh Mapleston | June 28, 2019 |
| 38 | 13 | "He's Misstra Know-It-All" | Josh Wakely | Jennifer Skelly | June 28, 2019 |
| 39 | 14 | "You Can't Hurry Love" | Josh Wakely | Jennifer Skelly | June 28, 2019 |
| 40 | 15 | "Uptight (Everything's Alright)" | Josh Wakely | Josh Mapleston | June 28, 2019 |
| 41 | 16 | "Agent Double O Soul" | Josh Wakely | Josh Mapleston | June 28, 2019 |
| 42 | 17 | "You Haven't Done Nothin'" | Josh Wakely | Charlotte Rose Hamlyn | June 28, 2019 |
| 43 | 18 | "Christmas Everyday" | Josh Wakely | Josh Mapleston | June 28, 2019 |
| 44 | 19 | "Don't Let the Joneses Get You Down" | Josh Wakely | Henry "Hank" Jones | June 28, 2019 |
| 45 | 20 | "Keep on Truckin'" | Josh Wakely | Jennifer Skelly | June 28, 2019 |
| 46 | 21 | "Easy" | Josh Wakely | Henry "Hank" Jones | June 28, 2019 |
| 47 | 22 | "Reach Out I'll Be There" | Josh Wakely | Josh Mapleston | June 28, 2019 |
| 48 | 23 | "I Want You Back" | Josh Wakely | Henry "Hank" Jones | June 28, 2019 |
| 49 | 24 | "Nowhere to Run" | Josh Wakely | Charlotte Rose Hamlyn | June 28, 2019 |
| 50 | 25 | "Higher Ground" | Josh Wakely | Erica Harrison | June 28, 2019 |
| 51 | 26 | "Living for the City" | Josh Wakely | Josh Mapleston | June 28, 2019 |

== Reception ==
Motown Magic received favourable reviews. Critics praised the concept of reimagining Motown songs for a young audience.

== Other media ==
=== Soundtracks ===
The first soundtrack to the show was released on online music-streaming service Apple Music on November 20, 2018.

== See also ==
- Beat Bugs
