= Josh Wakely =

Australian director, screenwriter, and producer

Josh Wakely is an Australian director, screenwriter, and producer and the founder of the television and film production company Grace: A Storytelling Company. Wakely is principally engaged in the development and production of feature films and series based on the music publishing catalogues of prominent music artists and genres, including The Beatles, Motown, and Bob Dylan and other artists in the Universal Music Group library of recorded master and publishing catalogues.

Wakely created the Emmy-winning Netflix original animated series Beat Bugs and Motown Magic, both on Netflix."

== Background ==
Wakely was raised in Newcastle, a coastal city two hours north of Sydney on the East Coast of Australia. He studied acting at Australia's Western Australian Academy of Performing Arts (WAAPA) before transitioning behind the camera and into the world of storytelling.

Wakely is a principal partner at Grace: A Storytelling Company, his film and television production company, based in Sydney and Los Angeles. He is represented by United Talent Agency.

== Beat Bugs ==
Wakely is the creator, director and producer of the children's animated series Beat Bugs, which Netflix premiered globally on August 3, 2016. Australia's Yahoo7 premiered the series on July 25, 2016 on 7Two. Netflix globally premiered Season 2 of the show on November 18, 2016. The show now airs on Nick Jr. in Australia.

Inspired by music by The Beatles, the series tells uplifting and life-affirming stories filled with hope and melody. For the show, Wakely acquired the worldwide rights in a deal with Sony/ATV Music Publishing to record covers of the entire Lennon/McCartney ‘Northern Songs’ music catalogue. He enlisted featured artists to cover songs in the show who include: Pink, Eddie Vedder, Rod Stewart, Robbie Williams, Aloe Blacc, Jennifer Hudson, James Corden, Sia, The Shins, James Bay, Chris Cornell and Wesley Schultz of The Lumineers.

Wakely's production company, Grace: A Storytelling Company, produced the series with Beyond Screen Production and Thunderbird. The Beat Bugs soundtrack is a joint release of Wakely's newly formed label Melodia and Universal Music's Republic Records.

Beat Bugs won the 2017 Daytime Emmy Award for Outstanding Writing in a Preschool Animated Program, and has since been nominated for eight Emmys. Awarded by the Motion Picture Arts and Sciences Foundation of British Columbia, Beat Bugs won the 2017 Leo Award for Best Animation - Program or Series and was nominated twice in the Best Voice Performance in an Animation Program or Series category. The show was also nominated for Best Animated Program or Series at the 2017 Canadian Screen Awards and Most Outstanding Children's Program at Australia's TV Week Logie Awards. In addition, the 'Yellow Submarine' episode won the 2016 AWGIE Award in Animation. Awarded by The Australian Writers' Guild, the AWGIE Awards recognize and reward excellence in performance writing. Beat Bugs also won the 2016 Australian Academy of Cinema and Television Arts (AACTA) award for Best Children's Television Series.

Beat Bugs also inspired a line of merchandise that is exclusively available at Target in the U.S. and Tesco in the U.K.

== Motown Magic ==
Wakely is the creator, director and producer of the children's animated series Motown Magic, which Netflix premiered globally on November 20, 2018. For the series, Wakely secured the rights to the Jobete and Stone Diamond catalogues that comprise hundreds of Motown's greatest hits.

Motown singer Smokey Robinson serves as executive music producer on the animated series. Motown Magic features newly recorded versions of songs by Smokey Robinson, Marvin Gaye, The Jackson 5, Lionel Richie, The Supremes, The Temptations, Stevie Wonder, and many more. Each 11-minute episode incorporates a plot line inspired by the themes and characters of a classic Motown song, and an original version of that song covered by contemporary artists including Ne-Yo, Becky G, BJ The Chicago Kid, Skylar Grey, Calum Scott, and Trombone Shorty.

Motown Magic is a story about music, magic and the power of imagination. Colorful and family-friendly, this animated series follows Ben, a wide-eyed eight-year-old with a big heart, and an active imagination, who uses his magic paintbrush to bring the street-art decorating his city, Motown, to life.

Melodia/Motown Records released the Motown Magic Original Soundtrack, a 13-song collection of classic Motown hits newly recorded for the show, on November 16.

In 2019, Motown Magic was nominated for an NAACP Image Award in the "Outstanding Children's Program" category.

== Other TV Projects ==
Wakely is currently developing multiple television projects based on various other music catalogues for which he has acquired the rights.

Wakely secured for Grace the rights to international music icon Bob Dylan’s entire 600-plus song catalogue, and is creating a television drama series based on his music.

Building on the popularity of Beat Bugs and the added success of the Dylan deal, Wakely secured additional groundbreaking deals for Grace, locking in the rights to the Jobete and Stone Diamond catalogues that comprise hundreds of Motown's greatest hits and Universal Music Group’s (UMG) vast collection of recorded master and publishing catalogues to create scripted entertainment based on the characters and themes found within these hallowed songbooks.

With extensive access to UMG's collection of catalogues, Wakely is also currently developing three television series: 27, Tropical Melody Island, and Mixtape (all working titles), all based on the music found within these catalogues.

In 2010, Wakely served as a writer on the acclaimed family series Lockie Leonard, which was nominated for a BAFTA and won an Australian Film Institute Award for Best Children's Drama.

== Film Projects ==
Wakely wrote and directed My Mind’s Own Melody, a cinematic modern musical that came out in 2011 and was accepted into the 2013 New York Film Festival. The short film featured original music and lyrics by former Silverchair front-man Daniel Johns and stars Golden Globe Award winner Lisa Gerrard.

Wakely has optioned the rights to Darin Strauss' best-selling memoir Half a Life, which tells the haunting story of one man's 20-year struggle with the accidental death of his high school classmate.
