= Thomas Duncan-Watt =

Australian Screenwriter

- Born: Sydney, New South Wales, Australia
- Occupations: Screenwriter; playwright
- Years active: 2012−present
- Known for: Dennis & Gnasher; Pirate Express; Winston Steinburger & Sir Dudley Ding-Dong; Beat Bugs; Alien TV; Space Nova; Home and Away
- Awards: Australian Screenwriters Guild Award; John Hinde Award for Excellence in Science Fiction Writing
- Website: www.thomasduncanwatt.com

Thomas Duncan-Watt is an Australian screenwriter and playwright. He has won three AWGIE Awards for his screenplays from five nominations. His work on UK series Dennis & Gnasher earned the series its first BAFTA nomination. In 2017, he was one of the mentors at the Arts/Screen Hackathon, along with Sarah Houbolt and others, which was organized by Australia Council for the Arts. In 2021, he won the John Hinde Award for Excellence in Science Fiction Writing for his work on the series Space Nova. In 2022 his original series The Eerie Chapters of Chhaya was announced as the winner of the Kindred co-production initiative between the ABC and CBC networks.

== Career ==
=== TV writing ===
Duncan-Watt began his career as a writer on Australian comedy series Good News Week. His series credits include Dennis & Gnasher, Pirate Express, Winston Steinburger & Sir Dudley Ding-Dong, Beat Bugs, Alien TV. In 2018, Duncan-Watt was brought on as one of the writers on sci-fi action series Space Nova, for which he also wrote the pilot. The series was subsequently nominated for two AWGIE Awards, with Duncan-Watt winning the award for his episode Ghost Station. In 2019, Duncan-Watt, and collaborator, Suren Perera won Best in Show at the Asian Animation Summit in Seoul for their 'original concept', Escape from Pirate Asylum. Duncan-Watt and Perera were also the first international winners of the Ottawa Animation Festival's ‘Pitch THIS’ competition, for their original series, Owl & Cloud.

=== Plays ===
Duncan-Watt is the co-creator of two comedy plays, Thank You For Being a Friend and That Golden Girls Show: A Puppet Parody, both of which use Muppets-style puppets to parody the 1980s television series The Golden Girls. Thank You For Being a Friend toured Canada, where it won ‘Best Independent Theatre Production’ at the Broadway World Awards. That Golden Girls Show: A Puppet Parody debuted in 2016 Off-Broadway. The show commenced a US tour in 2019.

== Awards and accolades ==
| Year | Award | By | For | Nomination /Won |
|---|---|---|---|---|
| 2014 | British Academy Film Awards | The British Academy of Film and Television Arts | Dennis & Gnasher | Nominated |
| 2015 | AWGIE Awards | Australian Writers' Guild | Pirate Express | Nominated |
| 2017 | AWGIE Award for Best Screenplay | Australian Writers' Guild | Winston Steinburger & Sir Dudley Ding-Dong | Nominated |
| 2017 | AWGIE Award for Best Screenplay, C- Classification | Australian Writers' Guild | The Deep | Won |
| 2018 | British Academy Film Awards | The British Academy of Film and Television Arts | The Deep | Nominated |
| 2019 | AWGIE Award for Best Screenplay, Animation | Australian Writers' Guild | Beat Bugs | Won |
| 2020 | AWGIE Award for Best Screenplay, Animation | Australian Writers' Guild | Space Nova | Won |
| 2021 | John Hinde Award for Excellence in Science Fiction Writing | Australian Writers' Guild | Space Nova (s1, e11, "Ghost Station") | Won |
| 2024 | AWGIE Awards | Australian Writers' Guild | Space Nova (s2, e2, "The Twister") | Nominated |
