= Doron Bell =

Canadian-American actor, musician and singer (born 1973)

Doron Bell Jr. (born December 8, 1973, in Montreal, Quebec) is a Canadian-born American actor, musician, and singer. He is known for his music, acting and voice work; he voiced the character Waldo in the Netflix animated series Dinotrux as well as many other animation projects. He once released an indie-reggae music single "Lightning" that featured Jamaican singer and Grammy winner Beenie Man. Bell also starred in the Lifetime original movie Toni Braxton: Unbreak My Heart as Scott Rhodes, the R&B star's manager. In spring 2019, Bell was cast as one of The Isley Brothers (Rudolph Isley) alongside R&B superstar Jason Derulo as Ron Isley in the film Spinning Gold starring Wiz Khalifa, Jeremy Jordan, Peyton List Michelle Monaghan and Jay Pharoah. He is also the older brother of fellow actor Dexter Bell.

== Selected filmography ==
- Hot Wheels Highway 35 World Race - Alec "Hud" Wood (2003)
- G.I. Joe: Spy Troops - Tunnel Rat (voice) (2003)
- Transformers: Energon - Cliffjumper (voice) (2004)
- Scooby-Doo 2: Monsters Unleashed - Drummer (2004)
- G.I. Joe: Valor vs. Venom - Tunnel Rat (voice) (2004)
- Def Jam Fight for NY - Hero (Rough)/Solo (video game voice) (2004)
- ToddWorld - Benny, Asante (voice) (2004)
- Alien Racers - G'rog (voice) (2005)
- Class of the Titans - Odie (voice) (2005)
- Firehouse Tales - Additional voices (2005)
- Deadly Skies - Guard Stevens (2006)
- George of the Jungle - Big Mitch (voice) (2007)
- Cosmic Quantum Ray - Lucas (voice) (2010)
- Voltron Force − Vince (voice) (2011)
- My Little Pony: Friendship Is Magic - Trenderhoof, Cattail (voice) (2014, 2017)
- Pirate Express - Booli (voice) (2015)
- Supernoobs - Shope's father (voice) (2015)
- Lego Ninjago: Masters of Spinjitzu - Griffin Turner (voice) (2015–2022)
- Dinotrux - Waldo, "The Silent Dude" Otto, Kelper (voice) (2015–2018)
- Tobot Athlon - Beta (voice) (2019–2020)
