= Australian Writers' Guild =

Professional association in Australia

AWG
- Australian Writers' Guild
- Founded: 1962
- Headquarters: Chippendale, Sydney
- Location: Australia
- Key people: Shane Brennan, president
- Affiliations: ACTU
- Website: www.awg.com.au

The Australian Writers' Guild (AWG) is the professional association for Australian performance writers for film, television, radio, theatre, video, and new media. The AWG was established in 1962, and has conferred the AWGIE Awards since 1968, the Monte Miller Awards since 1972, and the John Hinde Award since 2008.

The Australian Writers' Guild has been representing Australian screenwriters, playwrights, radio writers, comedy writers and digital media writers since 1962. It was created for writers by writers, with the council consisting of members within their respective performative industries. It aims to promote the Australian cultural voice within the arts. The guild recognises through their mission statement that performance writing and performance writers "thrive as a dynamic and integral part of Australian storytelling, shaping, reflecting and enhancing the Australian cultural voice in all its diversity." This is exemplified through AWG's work as a political voice through lobbying the Australian Government on issues such as funding and copyright protection in order to protect Australian content. The AWG is a member of the Australian Council of Trade Unions.

The AWG is a democratically run association, run by the members of the guild. Each year, the members elect the National Executive Council alongside Branch Committees that represent each Australian state. Membership is an essential aspect of the Guild as they dictate the leadership, action and fund distribution of the association. Shane Brennan, an Australian writer and producer, was elected president of the National Executive Committee in 2019.

As of 2019, The Australian Writers Guild is supported financially by the Australian Film Commission, Screen Australia, Scripted Ink, Film Finance Corporation Australia, Screenwest, Screen NSW, Screenrights, Media Super, and the South Australian Film Corporation. The AWG also receives assistance from the Literature Fund of the Australia Council.

== History ==
The Guild was founded in March 1962 when a group of 17 radio writers met at the Australia Hotel in Sydney and decided to form a guild to represent their professional interests. It was originally called The Australian Radio, Television and Screenwriters' Guild. Founded on the notions of misrepresentation within Australian society, exceptional underfunding and poor professional treatment, the AWG aimed to aid in these areas. The early 60s also saw an influx of imported media from predominantly the United States and England to Australian Television. This left minimal room for the local market and severely impacted the state of the Australian Media industry. A pivotal moment in societal advancement in switching from predominantly focused radio entertainment to the television, the founders of the guild were determined to ensure Australia was not left behind. The first interim committee comprised Don Houghton, Richard Lane, Ric Aspinall, Kay Keaveney and Lyle Martin.

Nearing the end of 1962, the Australian Writers Guild was officially registered as a Trade Union in New South Wales. This was seen as important because it provided recognition and support from other trade unions within the industry, notably Actors' Equity and the Musicians' Union.

1963 saw the AWG's first industrial dispute over an Australian network offering an unacceptable amount for a script written by Eleanor Witcombe. To quote Gillian Armstrong, a major Australian film director, 'Eleanor was not a self-promoter. She was proud and passionate and dedicated, and truly a great writer'. The Guild's deal encompassed both the entity itself and all reserved rights. Members stood against this cementing the Guilds power within the industry. The dispute was appropriately managed and the writer was appropriately paid. This became the Guild's first successful case in fighting for creators rights.

In 1967 Guild established the AWGIE Awards, with the first event held in 1968. These were presented to performance writers who demonstrated exceptional work within their respective fields. Created by the members, these awards aim to recognise and reward excellence in an extensive list of categories.

By 1968, the Guild was in negotiations with the ABC tackling performative writers rights once again. At this time, fees for scripts were at an extraordinary low. As a result of this, the AWG united with the Council of the Society of Authors and Actors' Equity in an attempt to resolve tensions between the ABC's treatment of its creators. The ABC eventually found an agreement to the Guild's terms of worker equity and signed off on the standard contract by the early 70s.

Lance Peters was the Guild's president at the turn of the decade. He initiated a library of professional scripts available for guild members. His leadership brought in the inclusion of legal advisors to assist with safeguard copywriter and contract negotiation. Victorian Guild members began lobbying for further autonomy in their own ran programs through the AWG. This threatened the Guilds status as a Trade Union in NSW, so the association was split into fully operative state branches as determined at the annual Federal Conference involving all members. Peters thus began to lobby against networks threatening the workers' rights of many performance writers. Emerging from this came the "Make it Australian" campaign, in which other writing industry guilds united in support of keeping performative media in Australia amongst Australian creators. Peters's involvement here truly marked the AWG's involvement in "political and industrial issues such as moral rights and copyright protection, censorship, taxation and broadcasting legislation".

1972, the tenth anniversary of the AWG's founding and Peters utilized this milestone to broaden the Guilds affiliations with "the Australian film commission, the Playwrights' Conference, the "Make it Australian" Committee, the Children's Film Council, the ASA, and the Copyright Council".

Later 1973 saw the guild join the Film Action Committee in order to raise media attention against visiting Jack Valenti in the US due to his ideology towards copyright. Through to 1979, the Guild was heavily influential in the fight for performance workers rights. Australian production houses were delaying their signing of an Industry-Wide agreement to produce a standard contract that saw for writers enforced rights and fair pay. Interim Industrial Officer Roger Simpson was responsible for overseeing this aspect of the Guilds work. David Wilson overtakes Peters as the president of the guild. 1980 saw the strike against Channel 9's pay towards its writers to be one of the Guilds longest and most successful campaigns. This resulted in the network paying its workers A$250 per hour of script as opposed to the A$60 originally being received. The strike lasted six months, from November 1980 to March 1981.

Throughout the 1980s, Australian performance industries were suffering from funding cuts. Tax concessions were the major focus of the Guild. Wilson sought for further government funding to help greater support the local film and television industries, offering that five out of the seven production projects taking place in Australia should be Australian written. Wilson signed off on this notion with the support of other unions to increase the appeal of local creators strengthening the local industry.

Approaching the end of the 1980s, the Australian Film Committee was in close contact with the Guild, strengthening the claims and actions taken by its members. United, the unions continued to campaign against low residual fees in performative writing contracts. 1988 saw the appointment of New Guild president Geoffrey Atherden, A Sydney University graduate infamous in his comedic screenwriting (particularly for his co-writing credits in The Aunty Jack Show). Angela Wales is later appointed as the first executive officer, in this role she was in close discussion with the AFC.

As the 1990s came in turn, the AWG had grown to have approximately 850 members and a similar amount of associates. With offices in Sydney and Melbourne and chapters in every other state, the guild had established itself as a powerful force within the performative writing world, standing firmly for workers writers in the film, television, radio and theatre industries across Australia. 1996 saw the guilds first real push for involvement in the Theatre industry in Australia. Negotiating the Theatre Industry Agreement, writers received minimum rates and commissioning rights for each piece crafted for the stage. This also involved that writers would share in box office receipts, 10% to each ticket sold, one of the highest rates in the world.

Late 1990s, between 1997 and 1999, AWG lobbied to ensure legislation encompassing moral rights and copyright rights for Australian creators. The Copyright Amendment (Moral Rights) Act 2000 was passed in December 2000. This protected Australian writers intellectual property and furthered the ramifications for breaking authorship integrity and workplace morality. The guild was heavily involved in this essential legislation.

In 2004, the guild partnered with The Sun-Herald and The Sydney Morning Herald to organize the What Matters? writing competition.

In 2009, the guild quit Australian Screen Council (established in 2005) over a financial disagreement.

For many years, the executive director of the organisation has been Jacqueline Woodman (now Jacqueline Elaine). In January 2019 Shane Brennan replaced Jan Sardi as president.

== The Australian performative writing industry ==
The initiatives and the services of the AWG service the individual members of the Guild while aiming to enhance the Australian performative writing industry as a whole. Applying the mission statement, seeing, "Performance writing and performance writers thrive as a dynamic and integral part of Australian storytelling; shaping, reflecting and enhancing Australia's cultural voice in all its diversity". In many instances, the AWG acts as the national voice of performance writers, seeking federal and state support to recognise performance writing within the Australian culture of storytelling.

2020 saw the impact of the COVID-19 pandemic in Australia within the AWG. The Guild worked in conjunction with Screen Australia to monitor the screen industries response to the unprecedented upheaval of the times. According to MediaWeek, one million Australian dollars was donated by Netflix to support the launch of the COVID-19 Film and TV Emergency Relief Fund in order to best support production shutdowns in Australia. AWG was as of June 2020 enabling the distribution of these funds to the hardest-hit workers.

== Awards ==
=== AWGIE Awards ===
Since 1968, the AWG has conferred the AWGIE Awards for excellence in screen, television, stage and radio writing. The AWGIE Awards include awards in a wide range of categories, such as feature film, television drama, and various theatre awards, as well as a number of special named awards, such as the David Williamson Prize for Excellence in Writing for Australian Theatre, Dorothy Crawford Award, Hector Crawford Award, and David Parsons Award.

=== John Hinde Award ===
The John Hinde Award for Excellence in Science-Fiction Writing is named in honour of film critic John Hinde (1911–2006), and funded by a bequest left by him. Intended to encourage and reward creativity in science-fiction writing for feature film, television, web series, and interactive media, the award is worth $10,000 for the best produced script, as well as professional support for the best unproduced script. They were awarded from 2008, and in the past have been awarded as (or considered) part of the AWGIE awards, but they are advertised as a separate award, and winners announced separately.

Winners have included:

- 2008: Doug McLeod, for Dogstar
- 2009: Shayne Armstrong and Shane Krauss, for K9, episode "The Fall Of The House Of Gryffen"
- 2010: Anthony Mullins, for Primevil Evolved
- 2011: Matt Ford, for Panic at Rock Island
- 2012: (no award)
- 2013: Shayne Armstrong, Bruce Kane, and Shane Krauss, for Exchange Student Zero
- 2014: Produced – The Spierig Brothers (Michael and Peter), for Predestination; Unproduced – Simon Butters, for Min Min
- 2015: Produced – Jesse O'Brien, for Arrowhead; Unproduced – Penelope Chai and Adam Spellicy, for Mary Mary
- 2016: Produced – Michael Miller, for Cleverman; Unproduced – Graeme Burfoot for his screenplay, Red to Blue
- 2017: Produced – Cris Jones (posthumously), for The Death and Life of Otto Bloom; Unproduced – C.S. McMullen, for Awake
- 2018: Unproduced – Georgina Love, for Pig (Also shortlisted were Tavis Urquhart for The Last Crop and Matt Vesely for Overheater; there was no award for a Produced script.)
- 2019: Produced – Lucas Taylor, for Eleven Eleven; Unproduced – Steve Mitchell for Cowtown
- 2020: Produced – Shelly Birse, for The Commons; Unproduced – David Peterson, for Untethered
- 2021: Produced – Thomas Duncan-Watt, for Episode 11 of the first season of the animated sci-fi series Space Nova, called "Ghost Station"; Unproduced – Thomas Atkin, for dystopian thriller film Kin (runners-up Kirsty Budding, for Harold, Electra & Our Lord, David Attenborough and Tony Radevski for Risen)
- 2024: (Note: These awards cover scripts produced in 2022 and 2023.) Produced in 2022 – Lucy Campbell for the 2022 feature film Monolith; Produced in 2023 – Charlotte Rose Hamlyn for an episode of the ABC Television series Space Nova called "Bread Nova"; Unproduced – Stephanie Westwood, for the game You Can Survive a Rip Current

=== Monte Miller Awards ===
The Monte Miller Awards, open to AWG members, recognise excellence in screenwriting and playwriting. The inaugural award was given to Peter Scott for Rally Round in 1972. It was not awarded between 1976 and 1979. Until 2007 there was just one Monte Miller Award, but from 2008 there have been two separate awards. In the past, they have been awarded as part of the AWGIE Awards, but in recent years have been announced at a separate event.

Two awards are given annually, both for un-produced scripts, in the categories Long Form (over 30 minutes) and Short Form (under 30 minutes), across all genres and formats. The award-winners are announced at a dedicated industry event in Melbourne in May; entries open in March.

== AWG membership ==
The function of the Australian Writers Guild is reliant on the membership structure of the association. There are a variety of tears of membership, and the accompanying fee paid by each member enables the Guild to create opportunities for its affiliates. The levels of membership are put in place to help differentiate the capabilities of each member within their field.

Full membership entails that the affiliate has a published or produced performance piece to their name. In order to qualify, the piece must be over 50 minutes long except a Television episode can be up to 45 minutes in length. The benefits of this membership include access to model contracts, recommended rates in the industries, industrial advice, networking opportunities, entry to AWG competitions, access to professional development seminars, Opportunities to Pathways and discounted prices on the industry-standard software among other elements.

Associated Membership eligibility is available for non published writers. These are the emerging writers that are looking for opportunity and networking in order to become a part of the writing community. This package includes stand access to agreements of co-writing and employment contracts, eligibility in writing competitions, access to industry events, professional resources, Pathways opportunities, AWG registration and assessment and discounted final draft software among other elements.

Student membership is eligible for any student enrolled in a part or full-time course in performance writing. The benefits of this membership are intended to aid in the development of the student's study. The package includes access to agreements and industry rates, accesses to standard industry agreements, invitations to industry and committee events, professional resource access, AWG script registration and assessment services among other elements.

Each membership can lead into a Lifetime membership of which 28 members currently hold. This is obtained over years of industry successes both in production and accolades.

== Pathways ==
Pathways is an AWG program developed by members for its members that showcases exemplar scripts in order to gain exposure to industry professionals in their respective fields. This gateway program enables members to have their works published and produced within the Australian industry, essentially jump-starting networking opportunities and careers.

Founded in 2010, the Pathways showcase has enabled Australian writers to gain exposure. Over 30 Australian projects have been funded by Scripted Ink. for further script development and even production. Scripts by guild members are showcased on the website. This is essentially free exposure for writers.

Pathways Prime consists of the works of some of Australia's most successful screenwriters inclusive of Keith Thompson's The Sapphires, Sam Caroll's H_{2}O: Just Add Water and McLeod's Daughters, and Sarah Smith's The Killing Field, among many other successful writers.
