= Andy Trieu =

Australian actor and martial artist

- Born: Andy Minh Trieu; 10 December 1984 (age 41); Canberra, Australian Capital Territory, Australia
- Occupations: Host, actor, martial artist

Andy Minh Trieu (born 10 December 1984), commonly known as Andy Trieu, is an Australian host, actor and martial artist. He is a three-time Australian Champion Martial Artist.

== Early life ==
Trieu was born in Canberra to Vietnamese parents. He attended Sacred Hearts Primary School and Marist College. He graduated from a double degree in Business and International Relations at the Australian National University in 2009. He was formerly a science communicator. He has a younger, and older brother.

== Career ==
Originally a martial artist, Andy Trieu expanded his repertoire from competing in tournaments to performing in roles across stage and screen. He has acted and presented on the Nine Network on programmes such as Kitchen Whiz as the Kitchen Ninja, minor role in Rescue: Special Ops and Crime Investigations. He has also appeared on SBS network shows Houso's, Bollywood Star and is a current a host on SBS PopAsia He also acted in the 2015 ABC TV comedy Maximum Choppage as Fury, and in the Australian zombie comedy cult classic Me and My Mates vs the Zombie Apocalypse alongside comedians Jim Jefferies, Greg Fleet and Alex Williamson. Trieu was a runner up for the national search for hosts on ABC3 and was a finalist in CLEO's Top 50 Bachelors. Trieu is also an advocate and ambassador for All Together Now Australia, and the National Stroke Foundation.

== Filmography ==
Year	Title	Role	Notes
2021	Shang-Chi and the Legend of the Ten Rings	Stunts; cameo appearance	
2014–2020	SBS PopAsia	TV Presenter	
2017	Turbines	Fred	
2017	Blue World Order	Tech	
2016	Hacksaw Ridge	Stunts	
2016	Young & Old	Old Samurai	
2016	Joe Cinque's Consolation	Joe T	
2015–2016	Pandemica Australia		
2015	"Maximum Choppage"	Fury	
2015	Me and My Mates vs the Zombie Apocalypse	Lachlan	
2011–2016	Kitchen Whiz	Kitchen Ninja	
2013	The Wolverine	Stunts	
2013	Pixel Pinkie		
2013	Home and Away	Tan	
2013	Theatre of the Dead	Ritchie	
2012	Packed to the Rafters	Mr Chan	
2011	Bloody Hell	Andy	
2011	Crownies	Thanh	
2010	Tomorrow When the War Began	Stunts	
2009	Rescue Special Ops	Felix Lam	
2006	Forensic Investigators	Zu	Season 3, Episode 2
