= SBS PopAsia =

Australian radio station and television program

- Australia
- Broadcast area: Australia via DAB+, Digital TV and Online

Programming
- Languages: English; Various
- Format: Pop Asian Music
- Subchannels: SBS Radio; SBS Chill; SBS Arabic; SBS South Asian

Ownership
- Owner: Special Broadcasting Service

History
- First air date: 2010

Technical information
- Licensing authority: ACMA
- Class: Public

Links
- Website: sbs.com.au/popasia/

SBS PopAsia is an Australian digital radio station that broadcasts music, most notably from East Asia and Southeast Asia, on digital radio, online and on mobile devices. The station originated as a two-hour segment on SBS youth radio programme Alchemy before launching as a stand alone digital radio station in 2010.

A television program of the same name was also broadcast on SBS and later SBS2 from 2011 to 2018, presenting back-to-back Asian Pop music videos. It was hosted by Jamaica de la Cruz until 2016, with Andy Trieu taking over as host until the show ended in 2018.

PopAsia fans are called PopAsians.

== History ==
SBS PopAsia began as a weekly two-hour segment on the SBS youth radio programme, Alchemy, as the Asian Pop Show. Due to growing popularity and increasing online fan engagement SBS PopAsia was launched as a 24-hour digital radio show in 2010.

In late 2011, a television program of the same name debuted on SBS's main free-to-air television channel in a two-hour timeslot from on Sunday mornings. In 2013, the program was extended to three-and-a-half hours of prime-time broadcast across Saturday and Sunday evenings on SBS's secondary channel (then SBS2, later SBS Viceland). In 2014, it reverted to its original 2 hour timeslot at 9am on Sundays. From 13 March 2016, it changed to a one-hour show on Sundays 10am to 11am on SBS2. PopAsia aired its final episode on Viceland on 8 July 2018.

== Radio ==
SBS PopAsia began transmitting in 2010. The station is available on DAB, the SBS mobile application, and channel 307 on Freeview across Australia.

SBS PopAsia hosts a variety of segments and shows on digital radio:

=== Current segments ===
- Breakfast Requests: Playing fan requests made through Facebook, Twitter or the request phone line.
- BTS Hit Zone: Broadcasts music from prominent South Korean boy band BTS.
- C-pop Central: Focuses on Mandopop and Cantopop.
- Filipino Buzz: Broadcasts mainly OPM and Pinoy pop.
- Girl Group Alumni: This segment focuses on recent releases, as well as hits, from girl groups.
- J-pop Nation: Mainly airs recent J-pop releases.
- K-drama OST: This segment plays music from Korean drama soundtracks, including classics as well as new releases.
- K-Wave: Mainly airs music from South Korea.
- V-Pop Vibes: Focuses on V-pop and other music from Vietnam.
- PopAsia Party: Every Friday and Saturday night the station plays a variety of upbeat Asian pop music for a party atmosphere.
- SBS PopAsia's Top 30 Countdown: This segment counts down the most popular Asian pop songs of the week.
- Sunday Night J-rock: Airing on Sunday nights, this segment is dedicated to Japanese rock, metal and other heavy music.
- The Anime Hour: Airs theme tunes from anime.
- The Old School Arvo: Plays past music from various artists.
- We Love Boybands: Mainly airs music from Asian boy bands.

=== Former segments/shows ===
Beats & Bars: Hip-Hop

An hour of hip-hop, rap and R&B music encompassing Asian countries including South Korea, China, Japan, Vietnam, Malaysia, Indonesia and more.

Boyband Friday

SBS PopAsia formerly aired music from boy bands for the entire day every Friday.

==== The New Music Show ====
Andy Trieu shares the latest song releases and pop culture news, and also interviews a variety of Asian pop artist

===== Live@5 Show =====
Between 2011 and 2014, fans could tune into the digital radio show between 5 and 7pm where co-hosts Jamaica dela Cruz and MegaMatt would count down the biggest Asian Pop hits in Australia as voted on Twitter and Facebook. The show was replaced by Hashtag Hits in 2014 which introduced a system of live voting through hashtags on Twitter.

===== Hashtag Hits =====
The Hashtag Hits show commenced in 2014. Every weekday, regular votes through Twitter and Facebook finalised the top 8 songs and a challenger. Live voting opened at 4.30pm (AEST) where listeners tweeted or posted on the Facebook wall the #Hashtag of their favourite song from the top 9. The concept of Titanium Status was introduced in June 2014 where when a song has reached number one for eight consecutive days, it becomes titanium. Despite anticipation that EXO's Overdose would be the first song to reach Titanium Status, in fact label mate Super Junior M succeeded with their song Swing. The other Titanium songs included GOT7's A, Beast's Good Luck (three times), Infinite's Last Romeo, Super Junior's Mamacita (two times) and Infinite's Back. All of the songs that have reached Titanium status are from Korean male groups rather than female groups.

===== Eat Your Kimchi =====
YouTubers Simon and Martina or Eat Your Kimchi, had a radio show on SBS PopAsia radio every Friday 7-8pm AEST. They talked about K-Pop and more largely Korean culture. Content covered include issues similar to the TL;DR's on their YouTube channel such as plastic surgery and the FIFA World Cup.

===== Prince Mak Hour =====
Australian member of K-pop boyband JJCC began hosting his own 1 hour radio show from 2015 on Tuesdays at 8pm. He played Asian Pop music and talked about his life as an Asian popstar

== Television ==
SBS PopAsia
- Non-stop Asian Pop
- Genre: Music
- Presented by: Andy Trieu
- Country of origin: Australia
- Original languages: English; Chinese; Korean; Japanese; Vietnamese; Bahasa Indonesia; Burmese; Thai
- No. of seasons: 8

Production
- Production locations: Sydney, Australia
- Running time: 60 minutes
- Production company: Special Broadcasting Services (SBS)

Original release
- Network: SBS (2011–2013); SBS2 (2013–2018)
- Release: 7 September 2011 – 6 July 2018

The SBS PopAsia television show launched on 7 September 2011 on SBS, airing 8.30am to 10.30am (AEST) on Sundays. Growing popularity saw an additional episode was added on Mondays at 5pm. With the relaunch of the SBS2 channel to focus on younger audiences, SBS PopAsia moved to the channel in 2013 and was broadcast every Sunday afternoon from 4 to 6pm, but was later changed to 9 to 11am. The show aired its final episode on 8 July 2018.

The show was rated PG and hence positioned the show as an accessible, family-friendly television programme. The previous weekend's episode could be accessed on the PopAsia website or on SBS on Demand for 7 days after the episode aired on television.

=== Audience interaction ===
The show debuted by displaying Tweets and Facebook messages at regular intervals throughout the show. However it was replaced by exclusively showing displays real-time audience tweets.

=== Advertisements ===
Advertisements relevant to those interested in Asian culture were sometimes played in the ad breaks. For example, the Korean Tourism Office aired videos such as PSY's "Wiki Korea" tourism project.

=== Segments ===
==== Three-in-a-row ====
The goal of this game was to guess the common theme between the three Asian Pop videos that are shown. Viewers were encouraged to play along by tweeting or posting their guesses. Previous themes included the beach, vampires, swirly lollipops and Australian Asian Pop stars. SBS PopAsia also encouraged viewers to submit their own three-in-a-row.

==== Double Play ====
Every week, the SBS PopAsia gave PopAsians the option of choosing which of two artists should have two of their music videos played in the next episode. The winning artist was chosen through voting on Twitter and Facebook.

==== PopAsia 101 ====
PopAsia 101s used to be broadcast weekly on PopAsia. This involved presenter 'PopAgent' Jay K, presenting a different 'PopAsia 101' – a 'super-fast, pop master class' on an Asian Pop artist. These were short featurettes that provide overviews of artist' careers, songs and trivia. The segment is intended to provide viewers with a gateway to engage with the landscape of Asian pop. Popular 101s include on artists Kyary Pamyu Pamyu, 365daband and EXO. PopAsia 101s can be found on the official YouTube channel.

In addition, there are special PopAsia 101s on topics relevant to Asian Pop such as on Flash Mobs and Australian Asian Pop Tours.

Date of release	Artist	Country that artist is active in	Reference
18 April 2012	Super Junior	South Korea	
23 April 2012	EXO	South Korea	
29 April 2012	Show Lo	Taiwan	
6 May 2012	Girls' Generation	South Korea	
14 May 2012	Perfume	Japan	
28 May 2012	Kyary Pamyu Pamyu	Japan	
1 July 2012	Big Bang	South Korea	
8 July 2012	2NE1	South Korea	
24 June 2012	IU	South Korea	
11 July 2012	miss A	South Korea	
30 July 2012	CNBlue	South Korea	
30 July 2012	Scandal	Japan	
5 August 2012	Psy	South Korea	
16 September 2012	Yui	Japan	
1 October 2012	BoA	South Korea	
8 October 2012	U-KISS	South Korea	
28 October 2012	TVXQ	South Korea	
27 December 2012	Rainie Yang	Taiwan	
11 March 2013	Thanh Bui	Vietnam	
18 March 2013	Passpo	Japan	
9 September 2013	Flash Mobs	N/A	
7 January 2013	Ailee	South Korea	
29 January 2013	2AM	South Korea	
25 February 2013	GReeeeN	Japan	
1 April 2013	Leehom Wang	Taiwan	
8 April 2013	NS Yoon-G	South Korea	
17 September 2013	Kara	South Korea	
10 December 2013	C-Clown	South Korea	
10 March 2014	Kyary Pamyu Pamyu (re-issue)	Japan	
7 December 2014	Cyndi Wang	China	
7 December 2014	Epik High	South Korea	
7 December 2014	VIXX	South Korea	
4 April 2016	Taeyang	South Korea	

- Date of release is listed as the date that the PopAsia 101 video was uploaded onto YouTube

==== Interviews ====
SBS PopAsia has hosted interviews with Asian Pop bands and artists such as BTS, EXO and Jay Chou and celebrities related to the Asian Pop industry such as YouTube stars Mychonny and Eatyourkimchi.

See Guests and interviewees section.

==== Video Requests ====
In 2012, SBS PopAsia took video requests whereby viewers could post videos on YouTube requesting a song to be played on PopAsia. The video request would then be then be played on PopAsia TV preceding the music video it was requesting.

=== Special episodes ===
When holidays and special events occur, SBS PopAsia hosts special PopAsia episodes:

- New Years/New Year's Eve: For New Year's Eve, there is an extended SBSPopAsia episode with video clips until or past midnight and a New Years' countdown. New Years' greetings from Asian Pop artists are shown.
- Lunar New Year
- Australia Day: there is an emphasis on songs by Asian Pop idols with Australian background, such as Kimberley Chen, C-Clown's Rome and LEDApple's Hanbyul.
- Christmas: PopAsia plays Christmas and holiday-related Asian Pop songs.

Additionally, when the show first started, PopAsia used to have special episodes for certain Asian Pop artists such as SHINee.

== Mobile ==
SBS PopAsia also has an official mobile application for both Apple iPhone and Android which can be downloaded for free from the respective platforms. The app's primary feature was the 24/7 streaming of PopAsia's digital radio station and beside each track has a track purchase button. The app also connects users to the PopAsia website and podcasts.

== Podcast ==
PopAsia podcasts can be downloaded off the Apple iTunes store. and primarily compromises of interviews such as regular chats with blog MyKoreanHusband. Also, there is some non-Asian pop related content such as 'Top 3 movies not to miss in 2014'.

== Guests and interviewees ==
SBS PopAsia regularly features guests on its TV, Radio and YouTube platforms. The date is in accordance to the date that the interview was uploaded onto SBS PopAsia's YouTube platform and hence may not reflect the original date of broadcast on SBS PopAsia's TV or radio platforms. Where there is not a specific interviewee, SBS PopAsia in general is specified as the interviewee.

Date	Country active in	Interviewee	Interviewer	Location of interview	Notes	Reference
12 November 2011	South Korea	SHINee	Jamaica dela Cruz	Backstage at ANZ Stadium, Sydney	SHINee performed as part of the line up for the 2011 K-Pop Music Festival. It was the second time they performed in Australia	
5 March 2012	Taiwan	Show Lo & Rainie Yang	Princess Ania	SBS PopAsia studio, Sydney	Show Lo and Rainie Yang were in Sydney to shoot a series of online videos for Tourism Australia while Show Lo also filmed 3 music videos.	
28 March 2012	South Korea	Hanbyul, then-member of LedApple	Princess Ania	South Korea	Conducted through Skype. The interview came a day after LedApple released the music video to their single, 'Sadness'	
29 March 2012	Taiwan	Lollipop F	SBS PopAsia	Sydney	Lollipop F were in Australia for their first-ever Sydney and Melbourne performances	
3 April 2012	South Korea	SM Entertainment representatives	Princess Ania	SBS PopAsia studio, Sydney	Artist and repertoire representatives Hanna Cho and Gi-Hyun Kim	
19 April 2012	South Korea	Jun Won Lee (YG Entertainment representative)	SBS PopAsia	South Korea	Jun Won Lee talks about what makes good talent and what happens when you join the YG Family	
19 April 2012	Australia	DarrenTP & Ice	Princess Ania	Melbourne, Australia	Darren and Ice were finalists in the YG Entertainment BigBang Cover Competition for Bad Boy and Fantastic Baby.	
24 April 2012	Taiwan	Dream Girls	Princess Ania	Sydney, Australia	Dream Girls were in Sydney to judge a Chinese singing competition	
16 May 2012	Philippines	Philippine AllStars	Princess Ania		World Hip Hop Dance Champions, the Philippine AllStars, gave Princess Ania a dance lesson	
21 June 2012	Bulgaria	Stanislav Ianevski	Princess Ania	Sydney, Australia	Ianevski acted as Viktor Krum in Harry Potter and the Goblet of Fire. Interview took place at SupaNova Pop Culture Expo in Sydney	
31 July 2012	South Korea/America	Jay Park	Jamaica dela Cruz	Australia/South Korea	Interview conducted via Skype. Was in lead up to his 'New Breed' concert to be held in Sydney and Melbourne later that year	
24 August 2012	South Korea	NU'EST	Jamaica dela Cruz	Sydney, Australia	NU'EST were interviewed at the 3rd Anniversary of Digital Radio in Australia celebrations at First Fleet Park in Sydney	
10 September 2012	South Korea/Australia	C-Clown's Rome	SBS PopAsia	Seoul, South Korea	Australian Leader of K-Pop group C-Clown. Talked about the group's name, his responsibilities, inspiration, creeper bee, hamster and pororo.	
29 September 2012	South Korea/America	Jay Park	Jamaica dela Cruz	Sydney, Australia	Interview conducted backstage at Jay Park's New Breed concert in Sydney, Australia	
10 October 2012	South Korea/Australia	EvoL's Hayana	Jamaica dela Cruz	South Korea/ Australia	Australian member of Korean girl group, EvoL. She talked about what she misses about Australia, her favourite food are and her favourite Aussie artist.	
15 October 2012	South Korea	Teen Top	Jamaica dela Cruz & Mega Matt	Seoul, South Korea	Conducted in wedding chapel in Seoul.	
16–19 October 2012	Australia	Janice Petersen	Princess Ania	SBS PopAsia studios, Sydney;	SBS World News Australia presenter, Janice Petersen, conducted a series of interviews with SBS PopAsia about the then-viral YouTube sensation, PSY, in their 'Eye on PSY' series	
24 November 2012	South Korea	100%	Jamaica dela Cruz	Seoul, South Korea	Part of a series of interviews that Jamaica dela Cruz and MegaMatt conducted when they were in Seoul, South Korea. 100% were then a rookie group	
29 November 2012	South Korea	TVXQ	SBS PopAsia	Seoul, South Korea		
1 February 2013	Philippines	KenJhons	SBS PopAsia	SBS PopAsia studio, Sydney	KenJhons talked about his debut single, Matinik	
14 February 2013	South Korea/America	NS Yoon-G	SBS PopAsia	South Korea/Australia	SBS PopAsia asked NS Yoon-G about a typical day in her life	
23 February 2013	South Korea/China	Super Junior M	SBS PopAsia	South Korea/Australia	They were interviewed on set for their latest music video release 'Break Down'	
28 March 2013	Taiwan	JPM's Prince	Jamaica dela Cruz	SBS PopAsia studio, Sydney	Prince was interviewed on SBS PopAsia radio ahead of an appearance in Sydney	
30 March 2013	Taiwan	Fahrenheit's Calvin Chen	Jamaica dela Cruz	Australia	Interview conducted over Skype. Chen, along with Xander (former member of Korean boy band, U-Kiss) were then in Australia to film the movie 3 Peas In A Pod.	
30 March 2013	Hong Kong/Korea	Alexander (Xander)	Jamaica dela Cruz	Australia	Interview conducted over Skype. Along with Calvin Chen, Xander was in Australia to film his first movie, 3 Peas In A Pod	
16 April 2013	Taiwan/America	Leehom Wang	Jamaica dela Cruz	Sydney, Australia	Interview conducted backstage of his first concert in Sydney, Australia	
5 May 2013	Indonesia	S.O.S	Jamaica dela Cruz	Indonesia/Australia	Indonesian girl group, S.O.S	
8 June 2013	Indonesia	S4	SBS PopAsia	Indonesia	Indonesian boyband	
9 June 2013	South Korea	CNBlue	SBS PopAsia	Big Top Luna Park, Sydney, Australia	Interview conducted backstage when CNBlue visited Australia for their Blue Moon World Tour	
16 June 2013	South Korea	EXO	Jay K	SM Entertainment, Seoul, South Korea	Interview conducted as part of series of interviews by SBS PopAsia when they travelled to Seoul, South Korea. Interview is about EXO's new album, XOXO	
23 June 2013	South Korea	2PM	Jay K	Seoul, South Korea	Interview conducted as part of series of interviews by SBS PopAsia when they travelled to Seoul, South Korea	
27 June 2013	South Korea	LedApple's Hanbyul	Jay K	Seoul, South Korea	Interview conducted as part of series of interviews by SBS PopAsia when they travelled to Seoul, South Korea. This is the second time that Hanbyul has been interviewed by SBS PopAsia	
6 July 2013	Vietnam	365daband	Jamaica dela Cruz		Via Skype.	
9 July 2013	South Korea	Wonder Boyz	Jay K	South Korea	Interview conducted as part of series of interviews by SBS PopAsia when they travelled to Seoul, South Korea	
15 July 2013	South Korea	4Minute	Jay K	PopAsia studios, Sydney, Australia	4Minute were in Australia for the 2013 K-Pop Cover Contest at UNSW	
25 July 2013	South Korea	JYJ	Jay K	Seoul, South Korea	Interview conducted as part of series of interviews by SBS PopAsia when they travelled to Seoul, South Korea in 2013	
28 July 2013	South Korea	uBeat	Jay K	Seoul, South Korea	Interview conducted as part of series of interviews by SBS PopAsia when they travelled to Seoul, South Korea in 2013	
4 August 2013	South Korea	T-ara N4	Jay K	Seoul, South Korea	Interview conducted as part of series of interviews by SBS PopAsia when they travelled to Seoul, South Korea in 2013	
11 August 2013	South Korea	Lunafly	Jay K	Seoul, South Korea	Interview conducted as part of series of interviews by SBS PopAsia when they travelled to Seoul, South Korea in 2013	
12 August 2013	South Korea	Boyfriend	Jay K	Seoul, South Korea	Interview conducted as part of series of interviews by SBS PopAsia when they travelled to Seoul, South Korea in 2013	
21 August 2013	South Korea	Nine Muses	SBS PopAsia	Seoul, South Korea	Interview about their insightful new documentary "9 Muses of Star Empire" which takes us behind the glitz and glamour of K-pop stars in the making	
25 August 2013	Canada/South Korea	Eat Your Kimchi	Jay K	Seoul, South Korea	Interview conducted as part of series of interviews by SBS PopAsia when they travelled to Seoul, South Korea in 2013	
1 September 2013	South Korea	LC9	Jay K	Seoul, South Korea	Interview conducted as part of series of interviews by SBS PopAsia when they travelled to Seoul, South Korea in 2013	
11 September 2013	South Korea	AOA Black	SBS PopAsia	Seoul, South Korea	Sub-group of South Korean girl group, AOA	
16 September 2013	Japan	Perfume	SBS PopAsia	Japan		
18 September 2013	Ireland	Jedward	SBS PopAsia	SBS PopAsia studios, Sydney, Australia		
23 September 2013	South Korea	Secret	Jay K	Seoul, South Korea	Interview conducted as part of series of interviews by SBS PopAsia when they travelled to Seoul, South Korea in 2013	
27 September 2013	South Korea	Xia	Jamaica dela Cruz	SBS PopAsia studios, Sydney, Australia	Xia was in Australia at the time for his Incredible Tour. He was the first K-Pop start to visit PopAsia HQ	
10 October 2013	South Korea	Yiruma	Jay K	Melbourne, Australia	Yiruma played Ailee's 'I Will Show You' on iPad piano	
14 October 2013	Australia	Justice Crew	Jamaica dela Cruz	SBS PopAsia studios, Sydney, Australia	Justice Crew were interviewed on the Live@5 SBS PopAsia radio show	
27 October 2013	South Korea	Hello Venus	Jay K	Seoul, South Korea	Interview conducted as part of series of interviews by SBS PopAsia when they travelled to Seoul, South Korea in 2013	
28 November 2013	South Korea	JYJ's Jaejoong	SBS PopAsia	Seoul, South Korea		
5 December 2013	Vietnam	Anna Truong	Jamaica dela Cruz	Hanoi, Vietnam	Interview conducted while the SBS PopAsia crew were in Vietnam for the ABU Song Festival	
22 December 2013	South Korea	Beast	SBS PopAsia	Seoul, South Korea	Special Christmas greeting for PopAsians	
30 December 2013	South Korea	VIXX	SBS PopAsia	Seoul, South Korea	New Year's message for PopAsians	
2 January 2014	Indonesia	Cherrybelle	SBS PopAsia	Melbourne, Australia	Holiday greeting for PopAsians	
18 January 2014	Myanmar	Me N Ma Girls	SBS PopAsia	Myanmar	A day in the life of the Me N Ma Girls	
10 February 2014	Seoul, South Korea	Dal Shabet	SBS PopAsia	Seoul, South Korea	Dal Shabet talk about what inspired their new comeback, BBB	
2 March 2014	South Korea	C-Clown	Jamaica dela Cruz	Seoul, South Korea	C-Clown talk about the possibility of coming to Australia	
4 March 2014	Japan/Malaysia/Australia	Che'Nelle	SBS PopAsia	Japan	Shout-out to Australian fans	
9 March 2014	South Korea	BTOB	SBS PopAsia	Seoul, South Korea	BTOB take time out of their busy 'Beep Beep' promotions schedule to greet PopAsians	
12 March 2014	Taiwan	Kimberley Chen	Jamaica dela Cruz	Taiwan	Talked about her favourite pop stars and what inspired her music	
25 March 2014	Japan	Kyary Pamyu Pamyu	Jamaica dela Cruz	Sydney, Australia	Interview conducted while Kyary was in Australia for her first Australian concert	
10 April 2014	Taiwan	Jay Chou	Jamaica dela Cruz	Sydney, Australia	Press conference while Chou was in Sydney for his concert	
19 April 2014	Japan	Da-ice	SBS PopAsia	Japan	They explain what their name means, who influences them and see what they have to say to Australian fans	
7 May 2014	Thailand	Slot Machine	SBS PopAsia	SBS PopAsia studios, Sydney, Australia	Thai rockers Slot Machine performed a special acoustic version of "Kloem" in studio	
10 May 2014	South Korea	B.A.P	SBS PopAsia	Big Top Luna Park, Sydney, Australia	Backstage interview with Korean boy band, B.A.P, while they were in Australia for their 2014 Live on Earth tour	
31 May 2014	Australia	Dami Im	Jamaica dela Cruz & Andy Trieu	SBS PopAsia studios, Sydney, Australia	Radio interview with Dami Im	
2 June 2014	South Korea	Eric Nam	Jamaica dela Cruz	South Korea	Eric nam reveals the Western pop artists he admires, what it was like to interview Miranda Kerr and a special message to Australian fans	
2 June 2014	Australia	Mychonny	Jamaica dela Cruz & Andy Trieu	SBS PopAsia studios, Sydney, Australia	Answered questions from hat submitted by PopAsians on SBS PopAsia radio show	
23 June 2014	South Korea	G.Na	Jamaica dela Cruz	South Korea	Talked about how she likes to change concepts & how she ran into Dami Im recently in Korea	
20 July 2014	Australia	Jeremy Yong	SBS PopAsia	SBS PopAsia studios, Sydney, Australia	Runner-up on Australia's Got Talent Series 6	
31 July 2014	Australia	Elly Oh	Jamaica dela Cruz & Andy Trieu	SBS PopAsia studios, Sydney, Australia	Interviewed on SBS PopAsia radio	
12 August 2014	South Korea	Henry Lau	Jamaica dela Cruz	South Korea	Henry talks about how his new album, Fantastic, differs from his first, what Western artist inspires him and he explains the most FANTASTIC thing that's ever happened to him	
20 September 2014	South Korea	B1A4	Jamaica dela Cruz	Big Top Luna Park, Sydney, Australia	Interview backstage at their 2014 Road Trip concert in Sydney, Australia. They were asked what they would really do if they had a "solo day" and what they would be doing if they weren't in B1A4	
9 November 2014	South Korea	Super Junior	Jamaica dela Cruz	South Korea	Interview about Super Junior's new album, This is Love	
18 November 2014	South Korea	Royal Pirates	SBS PopAsia	South Korea	Royal Pirates talk about their new single, Love Toxic, which artists they would most like to work with and how they would survive a zombie apocalypse	

Crayon Pop Block B
JJCC's Prince Mak

== Former on-air presenters and staff ==
Presenter	Biography	Social media
Andy Trieu	Andy Trieu is the current host of PopAsia TV and radio. He is a martial artist and aside from SBS PopAsia has appeared on other Australian TV shows such as Kitchen Whiz. His favourite Asian Pop band is Sistar.	Twitter Facebook
Jamaica de la Cruz	Jamaica de la Cruz was the original host of SBS PopAsia TV and PopAsia radio show 'Hashtag Hits'. She was born in the Philippines and came to Australia as an international student. She has an MBA in arts and entertainment management. Her favourite Asian Pop star is Wang Lee Hom whom she was able to interview in 2013 while he was in Australia for his Music Man II World Tour. In 2012 and 2013 she was a co-host for the ABU TV Song Festival. She left PopAsia in 2016.	Twitter Facebook Tumblr
Jay K	PopAgent and VJ, Jay K gives a 'PopAsia 101' on a different Asian Pop artist every week. Also popular are his Anime Minutes which are audio tracks which compromise of an approximately minute-long summary of an anime. Occasionally, he interviews Asian Pop artists such as in 2013 when he went on a PopAgent mission to Seoul, South Korea where he interviewed K-Pop groups such as EXO, Lunafly, uBEAT and 4Minute. His favourite Asian Pop band is Girls' Generation.	Twitter
MegaMatt	MegaMatt is the producer and button pusher at PopAsia. He co-hosted with Jamaica dela Cruz on the 'Live@5' show before it was replaced with the 'Hashtag Hits' show. His favourite Asian Pop star is Kyary Pamyu Pamyu.	Twitter Facebook
Kitty Em	Kitty Em is the host of the SBS PopAsia Radio show, J-Pop Nation, which airs 7pm (AEST) on Wednesdays. Her favourite Asian Pop band is Babymetal and her favourite food is edamame.	Twitter Facebook
Dr. J	Jamie or 'Dr. J' is PopAsia's Resident DJ and Music Guru. His favourite Asian Pop band is Girls' Generation and his favourite anime character is L from Death Note.	Twitter
Shay Shay	Shay Shay is PopAsia's resident Asian Pop guru. Her favourite Asian Pop group is BigBang and favourite anime character is Sailor Moon.	Twitter
Maddy Fryer	Maddy is the Executive Producer of SBS PopAsia. She sometimes appears on YouTube videos on the PopAsia channel such as for SBS PopAsia Reaction videos.	—N/a
Kevin Kim	Kevin is an Australian member of Kpop Group ZE:A. He is a song writer, singer, rapper and dancer, and also a former Arirang broadcaster.	Instagram Twitter

=== Guest programmers ===
Presenter	Biography	Social media
Eat Your Kimchi	Popular YouTube stars, 'Eat Your Kimchi' or Simon and Martina host the Eat Your Kimchi radio show every Friday 7 to 8pm (AEST).	Twitter Facebook
C-Clown's Rome	Australian leader of Korean boy group C-Clown, Rome, hosted the K-Wave show on Thursdays @ 7pm (AEST) in 2014.	Twitter Instagram
Patrick Phaiyakounh	Winner of SBS PopAsia's inaugural TV Presenter Search Competition held towards the end of 2014. He was a guest co-host for SBS PopAsia	—N/a
Prince Mak	Australian member of Korean boy group JJCC, Prince Mak, hosts The Prince Mak hour on Tuesdays @ 7pm (AEST)	Twitter Instagram
One Way's Peter	Peter hosts K-POP STUDIO on Thursdays @ 9pm (AEST)	—N/a
NU'EST's Aron	Aron hosts Aron's Hangout on Fridays @ 8pm (AEST)	—N/a

== Prizes and Competitions ==
SBSPopAsia regularly hosts competitions which can be found on their website. Competitions can be won through entering on their website or through phoning their radio show. Prizes include concert tickets (such as to BAP, 2K13 Feel Korea Festival, signed albums and merchandise and overseas trips to Asian destinations.

== Concerts and events ==
SBS PopAsia continues to be involved in the promotion of Asian acts coming to Australia. In 2011 SBS PopAsia was the official Australian media partner of the 2011 Sydney K-Pop Music Fest which features artists such as SHINee, Girls' Generation and TVXQ. PopAsia has gone on to support acts such as CNBLUE, 4Minute, J-Pop star Kyary Pamyu Pamyu and the inaugural KCON in 2017.

=== Coverage of concerts ===
SBS PopAsia has provided coverage and interviews for the following Asian Pop concerts in Australia:

- 2011 K-Pop Music Festival
- NU'EST for the 2012 K-Pop Cover Contest
- A-Mei Amazing World Tour 2012
- CNBlue Blue Moon Tour
- Wang Lee Hom Music Man Tour II
- 4Minute for the 2013 K-Pop Cover Contest
- XIA Incredible Concert 2013
- Crayon Pop 2013
- Kyary Pamyu Pamyu 2014
- Jay Chou Opus Jay 2013 World Tour
- BAP Live on Earth 2014 Tour
- B1A4 Road Trip 2014

=== Events ===
SBS PopAsia have participated in events such as the Campsie Food Festival in 2011 and 2012. Also, they are regularly involved in events relevant to Asian culture.

==== Lunar New Year ====
- Chatswood Lunar New Year 2014
- Sydney Lunar New Year Twilight Parade 2014
- Boyfriend and JJCC K-Pop Party Carriageworks 2016

==== Moon Festival ====
- Cabramatta Moon Festival in 2011, 2013 and 2014
- Box Hill Moon Festival (Melbourne) in 2011 and 2013

== Impact ==
The show is a mainstream acknowledgement of Asian popular music which was previously marginal in Australia due to an emphasis on Western music (Campbell 2010). As it is an SBS program, it has opened up the channel from a traditionally older multicultural audience to Australian youths of all backgrounds.

The show has impacted the accessibility of Asian Pop in Australia. Australia is seen as a small market to consume Asian pop but the program has been able to prove the growing demand for Asian Pop in Australia. This is evident through the increasing number of Asian pop concerts, especially K-Pop concerts in Australia.

As of January 2020, SBS PopAsia has over 1.3 million likes on Facebook, 31 million views on YouTube, 136.9K followers on Twitter, 104K subscribers on YouTube and 43K followers on Instagram.

These platforms have also become an avenue for Australian Asian Pop fans to interact with each other.

SBS PopAsia contributed to the creation of the radio apps, SBSDesi and SBSPopAraby.

== Controversy ==
Despite promoting itself as an Asian Pop TV and radio show, the majority of music played is from South Korea and specifically from male groups. PopAsia has responded by stating that Korean pop is the most requested genre of music. It has also been pointed out that PopAsia directly violates the charter of SBS.

== Awards ==
- Winner of Best Interactive Radio Program award at the Asia-Pacific Broadcasting Union (ABU) Awards in 2012.
- Winner of Advertising and Communication Award and the Grand Award for all categories at the 2012 National Multicultural Marketing Awards
- Finalist for New York Festivals World's Best Radio Programs in the category of Programming Format/Best Alternative Format.

== See also ==
- List of Australian music television shows
- List of radio stations in Australia

== Bibliography ==
- Giuffre, Liz; Keith, Sarah (2014). "SBS PopAsia: Non-stop K-pop in Australia". In Choi, JungBong; Maliangkay, Roald (eds.). K-pop — The International Rise of the Korean Music Industry. Routledge. pp. 81–97. ISBN 978-1-317-68180-9.
