= The Murder Game =

The Murder Game may refer to:

== Film and TV ==
- The Murder Game (TV series), a 2003 BBC television series
- The Murder Game (2006 film), a 2006 film
- The Murder Game (1965 film), a 1965 film

== Novels ==
- The Murder Game (novel), a 1997 Doctor Who novel
- The Murder Game, a novel by Beverly Barton

== See also ==
- Murder Games (disambiguation)
- Murder (disambiguation)#Gaming
- Death game, a survival variant of the battle royale genre in fiction
