= Drop It Low =

Drop It Low may refer to:

- "Drop It Low" (Ester Dean song), 2009
- "Drop It Low" (Kat DeLuna song), 2011
- "Drop it low", song by Michael Fall from the 2013 album Turn on your radio
- "Drop It Low" (S.O.S song), 2013
