= Neil's Party =

- Directed by: Stephen Pidgeon
- Written by: Stephen Pidgeon; Graham Pidgeon; Philip Lott; Kevin Markwick
- Produced by: Stephen Pidgeon
- Starring: Andrew Casey; Lauren Bigby; Sarah Canon; Joe Wells; Jessica Blundell; Bryn Lucas
- Cinematography: Alan Dunlop
- Distributed by: Warner Bros. Lightyear Entertainment
- Release date: 2005
- Countries: United States; United Kingdom
- Language: English

Neil's Party is a 2005 British comedy film starring Andrew Casey, Lauren Bigby, Sarah Cannon, Joe Wells, Jessica Blundell, Bryn Lucas and directed by Stephen Pidgeon. The film is distributed by Warner Bros. and Lightyear Entertainment.

== Plot ==
Four British buddies arrange a wild party of sex, booze and rock and roll as the ultimate solution to their problems with the opposite sex.
