= Start One Sensation =

Start One Sensation (EP)

EP by S.O.S
- Released: February 14, 2013
- Genre: Pop, K-pop
- Length: 12:43
- Producer: Sony Music Korea

Singles from Start One Sensation
- 1. "Drop It Low" Released: 11 February 2013

Start One Sensation is a debut EP by Indonesian K-pop girlgroup S.O.S, released exclusively to iTunes on February 11, 2013.

== Track listing ==
No.	Title	Lyrics	Music	Length
1.	"Drop It Low" ((Indonesian version))	Valiant Budi Yogi (Vabyo), Pongki Barata	Seo Yong-bae	2:59
2.	"Independent Girl" ((Indonesian version))	Vabyo, Pongki Barata	Seo Yong-bae	3:26
3.	"Drop It Low" ((English version))	Vabyo, Pongki Barata	Seo Yong-bae	2:59
4.	"Independent Girl" ((English version))	Vabyo, Pongki Barata	Seo Yong-bae	3:19
Total length:				5:58

== Personnel ==
- Maria Olivia Budiman - Leader, sub vocal, visual
- Sannia Arumasari - Main rapper, lead dancer
- Jodis Rezky Anggreny Sarira Mangiwa - Main Dancer, Lead vocal, lead rapper, center
- Andi Adisty Wahyuni - Vocals, visual
- Yedi Yelia Dongoran - Vocals, Maknae
- Veronica Febrianty - Main vocals

== Release history ==
Region	Date	Format	Label
Australia	11 February 2013	digital download	Sony Music Korea
Belgium	11 February 2013	digital download	Sony Music Korea
France	11 February 2013	digital download	Sony Music Korea
Greece	11 February 2013	digital download	Sony Music Korea
Indonesia	11 February 2013	digital download	Sony Music Korea
India	11 February 2013	digital download	Sony Music Korea
Ireland	11 February 2013	digital download	Sony Music Korea
Italy	11 February 2013	digital download	Sony Music Korea
Malaysia	11 February 2013	digital download	Sony Music Korea
Mexico	11 February 2013	digital download	Sony Music Korea
New Zealand	11 February 2013	digital download	Sony Music Korea
Philippines	11 February 2013	digital download	Sony Music Korea
Portugal	11 February 2013	digital download	Sony Music Korea
Spain	11 February 2013	digital download	Sony Music Korea
United Kingdom	11 February 2013	digital download	Sony Music Korea
United States	11 February 2013	digital download	Sony Music Korea
