= Legit (2013 TV series) =

American comedy television series

- Genre: Sitcom
- Created by: Jim Jefferies; Peter O'Fallon
- Written by: Jim Jeffries; Peter O'Fallon; Rick Cleveland (season 1); Chris Chase (season 2)
- Directed by: Peter O'Fallon
- Starring: Jim Jefferies; Dan Bakkedahl; DJ Qualls
- Country of origin: United States
- Original language: English
- No. of seasons: 2
- No. of episodes: 26

Production
- Executive producers: Jim Jefferies; Peter O'Fallon; Rick Cleveland; Lisa Blum
- Camera setup: Film; Single-camera
- Running time: 21-23 minutes
- Production companies: Regular Guy Films; Nugget Productions; FX Productions

Original release
- Network: FX
- Release: January 17 – April 11, 2013
- Network: FXX
- Release: February 26 – May 14, 2014

Legit is an American sitcom created by Peter O'Fallon and Jim Jefferies. The series premiered on January 17, 2013, on the American cable television network FX and ended on May 14, 2014, on FX's sister channel FXX. The executive producers were Jefferies, O'Fallon, Rick Cleveland, and Lisa Blum.

On March 28, 2013, Legit was renewed for a second season by FX and moved to FXX. On May 14, 2014, it was announced that Legit was cancelled due to low ratings and would not return to FXX for a third season.

== Cast ==
=== Main ===
- Jim Jefferies as himself – an Australian stand-up comedian who very rarely takes things seriously
- Dan Bakkedahl as Steve Nugent – Jim's best friend and roommate who is suffering from depression after divorcing his wife
- DJ Qualls as Billy Nugent – Steve's vocal, and often cunning brother with muscular dystrophy who tries to retain as much independence as he still can

=== Recurring ===
- Mindy Sterling as Janice Nugent – Steve and Billy's irritable, controlling and overprotective mother who openly despises Jim
- John Ratzenberger as Walter Nugent – Steve and Billy's unusually laid-back father
- Sonya Eddy as Ramona – Billy's no-nonsense personal nurse
- Magda Szubanski as Anne Jefferies – Jim's mother
- George Lazenby as Jack Jefferies – Jim's father
- Nick Daley as Rodney – Billy's perverted but gifted and multi-talented friend and former roommate from the care facility
- Ginger Gonzaga as Peggy – Jim's on/off girlfriend
- Arden Myrin as Tess – A sex addict who briefly dates Billy
- Jill Latiano as Katie Knox – Jim's first love
- Andrea Bendewald as Georgia – Steve's ex-wife, and mother of his daughter

== Episodes ==
Season	Episodes	Originally released		
Season	Episodes	First released	Last released	Network
1	13	January 17, 2013	April 11, 2013	FX
2	13	February 26, 2014	May 14, 2014	FXX

=== Season 1 (2013) ===
No. overall	No. in season	Title	Directed by	Written by	Original release date	Prod. code	US viewers (millions)
1	1	"Pilot"	Peter O'Fallon	Peter O'Fallon & Jim Jefferies	January 17, 2013	YJN101	0.65
Australian comedian Jim Jefferies tags along and reunites with his friend, Billy Nugent (DJ Qualls), who has muscular dystrophy and is paralyzed from the chest down. Billy stays at a care facility where his roommate and Billy's brother, Steve (Dan Bakkedahl), visit him regularly. At Billy's request, Jim and Steve drive him to a Las Vegas brothel to lose his virginity which due to his physical condition, could possibly kill him.
2	2	"Dreams"	Peter O'Fallon	Peter O'Fallon, Jim Jefferies & Rick Cleveland	January 24, 2013	YJN102	0.63
After seeing how unhappy Billy is at the care facility, Jim resolves to break Billy out of his room but his actions end up making Billy's living situation even worse.
3	3	"Love"	Peter O'Fallon	Peter O'Fallon, Jim Jefferies & Rick Cleveland	January 31, 2013	YJN103	0.71
Billy decides that he wants to have a real relationship, so Jim sets him up on a video dating website, where Billy becomes infatuated with a woman named Renee (Katy Sullivan), but he doesn't want to reveal to her that he has muscular dystrophy, or that Jim is assisting with the conversation. After overhearing Jim's pickup tips to Billy, a skeptical Steve tries them out himself on his coworker, Lauren (Rosalie Ward), with surprising results.
4	4	"Anger"	Peter O'Fallon	Peter O'Fallon, Jim Jefferies & Rick Cleveland	February 7, 2013	YJN104	0.42
With Steve in tow, Jim boards a crowded airplane to a gig, where he gets into an argument with a large man (Leonard Earl Howze) sitting beside him over the use of an armrest while the rest of the passengers spectate and shift between which side of the argument they support. Billy's mother, Janice (Mindy Sterling) disapproves of Billy's living arrangements with Jim and Steve, so against his wishes, she tries to hire a nurse for him.
5	5	"Justice"	Peter O'Fallon	Peter O'Fallon, Jim Jefferies & Rick Cleveland	February 14, 2013	YJN105	0.55
Jim, Steve, Billy, and Jim's on/off girlfriend, Peggy (Ginger Gonzaga) appear in court to retell a story where two men broke into their house and physically assaulted and robbed them after mistaking Jim and Steve for drug dealers.
6	6	"Family"	Peter O'Fallon	Peter O'Fallon, Jim Jefferies & Rick Cleveland	February 21, 2013	YJN106	0.84
After Jim speaks before a classroom about being a comedian, he leaves an impression on Ramona's (Sonya Eddy) nephew, Clay (Denzel Whittaker), which Ramona sees as a bad example. She demands that Jim lead him along the right path before he attracts attention from the wrong crowd. Steve becomes distraught after he becomes aware of a digital camera containing pictures of his ex-wife having sex with his neighbor, whose car Steve happens to be driving.
7	7	"Health"	Peter O'Fallon	Peter O'Fallon, Jim Jefferies & Rick Cleveland	February 28, 2013	YJN107	0.55
After losing a movie role due to his appearance and weight, Jim seeks help from Andy Dick, who hires a trainer (Eddie Ifft) for him. Jim then unwittingly destroys his trainer's routine when he reintroduces alcohol and drugs into his life, as well as giving him pick up tips after he becomes smitten with Ramona.
8	8	"Hoarders"	Rick Cleveland	Peter O'Fallon, Jim Jefferies & Rick Cleveland	March 7, 2013	YJN108	0.65
While helping Steve with an errand, Jim discovers that Steve and Billy's father, Walter (John Ratzenberger) is living in a tent in his own back yard, while Janice resides in a house packed to the ceiling with thousands of boxes containing porcelain dolls and figurines, among other unnecessary things. Due to the severity of the situation, Jim and the Nugents finally confront Janice about her hoarding problem.
9	9	"Bag Lady"	Peter O'Fallon	Peter O'Fallon, Jim Jefferies & Rick Cleveland	March 14, 2013	YJN111	0.49
Jim becomes involved in a very tense situation after he brings home a celebrity (Bre Blair) from a bar who is married to a politician.
10	10	"Cuckoo's Nest"	Peter O'Fallon	Peter O'Fallon, Jim Jefferies & Rick Cleveland	March 21, 2013	YJN110	0.76
Jim volunteers at the care facility where Billy used to live, and tries to pick up a nice, attractive nurse (Rachel Blanchard) that works there. Billy and the other residents, who idolize her, do everything in their power to prevent Jim from succeeding. After misunderstanding directions, autistic Rodney (Nick Daley) continues to run with an egg in a spoon after finishing a race at the care facility, and meets and unwittingly inspires a number of people from very different walks of life.
11	11	"Hat Hair"	Peter O'Fallon	Peter O'Fallon, Jim Jefferies & Rick Cleveland	March 28, 2013	YJN109	0.58
Jim, Steve, Rodney, and Billy go to a minor league baseball game, where Jim is to make the first pitch. Billy is very bitter and makes a scene because he hates the sport, and tells other spectators around him that Jim "only brought him for the seats", among other horrible (and mostly false) things to spite him. An old woman (Gwen Van Dam) tries desperately to have Jim arrested by the police after he unknowingly runs over her cat on his way to the game, while her husband (Curt Lowens) couldn't care less about the development.
12	12	"Misunderstood"	Peter O'Fallon	Peter O'Fallon, Jim Jefferies & Rick Cleveland	April 4, 2013	YJN112	0.53
Jim meets an attractive actress (Annie Heise) while auditioning for a movie. Though they initially hit it off, he is quickly booted from her car and accused of being an attempted rapist after making a joke in reference to an unusual phone call she made earlier. Steve falls into a depression when he discovers that his ex-wife (Andrea Bendewald) is taking their daughter to live in another state with her new boyfriend, so Jim takes him bar-hopping, and they eventually find themselves in a gay bar.
13	13	"Fatherhood"	Peter O'Fallon	Peter O'Fallon, Jim Jefferies & Rick Cleveland	April 11, 2013	YJN113	0.62
Wendy (Kate Luyben), the prostitute Billy lost his virginity to in the first episode shows up at Jim's door, nine months pregnant, and claiming that Billy is the father. Janice cannot accept that the mother of her grandchild is a prostitute.

=== Season 2 (2014) ===
No. overall	No. in season	Title	Directed by	Written by	Original release date	Prod. code	US viewers (millions)
14	1	"Loveline"	Peter O'Fallon	Chris Case, Peter O'Fallon & Jim Jefferies	February 26, 2014	YJN202	0.30
After a humiliating appearance on Dr. Drew's radio show, Jim attends a self-help group for sexual addiction.
15	2	"Death"	Peter O'Fallon	Jim Jefferies, Chris Case & Peter O'Fallon	March 5, 2014	YJN203	N/A
At the recommendation of his therapist, Jim does standup at Billy's old care facility, with tragic results.
16	3	"Racist"	Peter O'Fallon	Chris Case, Jim Jefferies & Peter O'Fallon	March 12, 2014	YJN204	0.13
Jim tries to "cure" Sara's racism by introducing her to black people. Meanwhile, Walter proves to be a bad influence on Billy and Steve.
17	4	"Reunion"	Peter O'Fallon	Peter O'Fallon, Jim Jefferies & Chris Case	March 19, 2014	YJN201	N/A
Jim and Steve attend their high school reunion, with Billy in tow, and each tries to repair old relationships.
18	5	"Checkmate"	Peter O'Fallon	Peter O'Fallon, Jim Jefferies & Chris Case	March 26, 2014	YJN205	N/A
Everyone must scramble to reclaim the van after it is towed with Billy trapped inside.
19	6	"Rub & Slide"	Peter O'Fallon	Jim Jefferies, Chris Case & Peter O'Fallon	April 2, 2014	YJN206	N/A
Mother Gunther and Dad Jefferies (George Lazenby) arrive to visit. When Jeff's mom lands in the hospital, the boys are free to enjoy the massage parlor and waterpark.
20	7	"Afghanistan"	Peter O'Fallon	Jim Jefferies, Chris Case & Peter O'Fallon	April 9, 2014	YJN207	N/A
To get away from his parents, Jim takes a gig entertaining soldiers in Afghanistan. Billy wishes he was so lucky, as he is stuck in the hospital with Jim's mom.
21	8	"Homeless"	Todd Biermann	Chris Case, Jim Jefferies & Peter O'Fallon	April 16, 2014	YJN208	N/A
Jim & co. have to track down Walter after he decides to leave the apartment. Steve makes an unpleasant discovery about his mother and Billy must choose between sex and video games.
22	9	"Licked"	Peter O'Fallon	Peter O'Fallon, Jim Jefferies & Chris Case	April 23, 2014	YJN209	N/A
Insult follows injury when, after Jim discovers that Peggy is dating Bob Saget, he finds himself in a compromising position with a Hollywood producer (Carrie Fisher) in the hopes of advancing his career.
23	10	"Weekend"	Peter O'Fallon	Jim Jefferies, Chris Case & Peter O'Fallon	April 30, 2014	YJN210	N/A
Steve's depression spirals out of control after he learns that Georgina is pregnant and will marry Todd. It's up to Jim and Billy to take care of Emily for the weekend.
24	11	"Intervention"	Peter O'Fallon	Chris Case, Jim Jefferies & Peter O'Fallon	May 7, 2014	YJN211	N/A
An intervention for Steve is sabotaged by poor planning and a send-off from Jim with cocaine and hookers.
25	12	"Sober"	Peter O'Fallon	Jim Jefferies, Chris Case & Peter O'Fallon	May 14, 2014	YJN212	N/A
After attempting to perform sober for the first time ever, Jim suffers a panic attack which causes his agent to drop him. Jim and his posse attend a 40th birthday party for Katie's husband (Rhys Darby), which turns out to be awkward for everyone.
26	13	"Honesty"	Peter O'Fallon	Peter O'Fallon, Jim Jefferies & Chris Case	May 14, 2014	YJN213	N/A
Jim's celebrity finally skyrockets after his shooting incident, but at the same time he is paralyzed with self doubt and contemplates giving up standup for good.

== Broadcast ==
In Australia, Legit aired Thursdays on The Comedy Channel.
