= Harley Flanagan: Wired for Chaos =

- Theatrical release poster
- Directed by: Rex Miller
- Produced by: Elisabeth Haviland James; Laura Lee Flanagan; Rex Miller
- Cinematography: Derek Howard; Daniel Fong; Israel Perez-Hortal; Rex Miller
- Edited by: Elisabeth Haviland James; Josh Granger; Mikkel Elbech; Sandrine Isambert
- Music by: David Majzlin
- Animation by: Daniel de Graaf; Natalie Greene; Richard O'Connor
- Production company: Rexpix Media
- Distributed by: Lightyear Entertainment
- Release dates: November 14, 2024 (Doc NYC); June 20, 2025 (United States)
- Running time: 97 minutes
- Country: United States
- Language: English

Harley Flanagan: Wired for Chaos is a 2024 American documentary film that follows the story of Harley Flanagan, directed and produced by Rex Miller.

The film premiered at the Doc NYC on November 14, 2024, and was released in the United States on June 20, 2025.

== Premise ==
From a tumultuous Bronx upbringing, the movie chronicles Harley Flanagan's rise to punk stardom at 13, featuring raw NYC footage and interviews with icons like Flea and Ice-T, depicting his transformative journey.

Decibel noted the film does not follow the usual rock documentary template. Instead using psychic excavation, home footage, along with bursts of archival chaotic footage.

== Soundtrack ==
Due to not having the right to use songs from The Age of Quarrel, Flanagan instead opted to re-record a few tracks as instrumental covers. However this turned into him re-recording the whole album, which will eventually be re-released as the 40th anniversary of Age of Quarrel on November 13, 2026.

== Release ==
Harley Flanagan: Wired For Chaos first had its world premiere at the Doc NYC on November 14, 2024. It also premiered at the Slamdance Film Festival on February 21, 2025. On March 31, 2025, Lightyear Entertainment acquired the worldwide distribution rights to the film, and released the film theatrically in the United States on June 20, 2025.

== Reception ==
Critics praised the film for its portrayal of Flanagan's life.

The Guardian gave the film 3/5 stars stating "The film-makers' interviews with Flanagan might, perhaps, have probed him more about his anger and his feelings about his mother; still, it's one hell of a story."

Michael Talbot-Haynes of Film Threat stated "Harley Flanagan: Wired For Chaos will be relished by anyone who has stared at an oncoming brick wall and laughed at it. It will flat-out amaze everyone else."

The Hudsonian described the film as "a new and refreshing watch, with no filter every viewer is entitled to a raw, grunge-esc, and serendipitous experience" and commends the depth added by interviews with Flanagan's friends, including Flea, Ice-T, Henry Rollins, members of the Bad Brains, and Jocko Willink.
