= The Orange Thief =

- Directed by: Vinnie Angel; James D'Angelo; Arthur Wilinski
- Written by: Vinnie Angel; James D'Angelo
- Produced by: Vinnie Angel; Boogie Dean; Arthur Wilinski
- Starring: Andrea Calabrese; Alessio Giottoli; Micaela Helvetica Saxer
- Cinematography: Vinnie Angel; James D'Angelo; Jim Reed; Arthur Wilinski
- Edited by: Vinnie Anel; James D'Angelo; Arthur Wilinski
- Music by: Taylor Cutcomb; Andrea Calabrese
- Distributed by: Vivendi Entertainment; Lightyear Entertainment
- Release date: October 12, 2007
- Running time: 84 minutes
- Country: United States
- Language: Sicilian

The Orange Thief is a Sicilian language Italian film shot in Lucca Sicula by a group of American and Italian actors and filmmakers. It stars Andrea Calabrese, Alessio Giottoli and Micaela Helvetica Saxer.

The Orange Thief was written and edited by Sicilian-American brothers James D'Angelo, D'Angelo was credited under the pseudonym Boogie Down, and Vinnie Angel. It was produced and directed by D'Angelo, Angel and production artist Arthur Wilinski.

The film won the Maverick Award for Best Editing at the Woodstock Film Festival in 2006. The film also received press attention for how it was made.

== Plot ==
In Sicily, a young thief who has nothing sleeps under the stars and steals and sells oranges. Thievery gets him tossed in jail where his cellmate is Turrido, who offers the thief a deal: get Turrido's ex-lover Rosalba to make a recording of her singing and Turrido will give the thief a piece of land of his own.

== Critical reception ==
Variety, "Beguiling goof “The Orange Thief” is a sort of traditional Sicilian musical heavily indebted in style and flavor to the trademark deadpan of Jim Jarmusch."

San Francisco Chronicle, "A surprise hit."

Times Herald-Record, "Arguably the hottest film at the festival."
