= Murder Games =

Murder Games may refer to:

- "Murder Games", a song by Badflower from the album OK, I'm Sick
- Murder Games, a 2017 novel by James Patterson and Howard Roughan

== See also ==
- The Murder Game (disambiguation)
