= Die on Your Feet =

- Genre: Comedy drama
- Created by: Greg Fleet
- Based on: Die on Your Feet (2005) (play)
- Starring: Greg Fleet; Adam Hills; Alan Brough; Corinne Grant; Steven Gates
- No. of seasons: 1
- No. of episodes: 8

Production
- Running time: 28 minutes

Original release
- Release: 7 August – 25 September 2014

Die on Your Feet is an Australian television comedy series premiering on One on 7 August 2014. The eight-part series follows the story of five fictional stand-up comedians at the Melbourne International Comedy Festival. The main characters are played by five comedians, and the show had its debut screening during the 2013 edition of the MICF. The show incorporates real elements of the Australian comedy scene, through the name-dropping and cameo appearances of comics as fictionalized versions of themselves.

The series was originally written by Greg Fleet as a play in 2005, but he later changed it into a TV format. It was filmed in 2010, with some scenes shot during an actual MICF gala. Due to difficulties getting the show picked up by a network, it did not air until 2014.

== Plot ==
Five comedians and flatmates figure out their shows and relationships during a run of the Melbourne International Comedy Festival. Brian Ibsen (Hills) and Sophie Glass (Grant) are antagonistic ex-partners whose separation has not yet been made public. O.J. (Brough) and J.J. (Gates) also have recently separated from each other professionally, having been a well-established comedy duo. They all rally together to help O.J. figure out his show and gala spot, as well as promote him, all of which he is reluctant to do.

== Cast ==
- Greg Fleet as Bob Graffoe, an older comedian
- Adam Hills as Brian Ibsen, Sophie's cocky and unfaithful ex-boyfriend
- Alan Brough as O.J. (other James) Wilson, an edgy comedian who requires the help of his flatmates to get his show off the ground
- Corinne Grant as Sophie Glass, Brian's ex-girlfriend and an alcoholic
- Steven Gates as J.J. James, a former children's TV star

== Supporting and guest cast ==
- Claire Hooper as Jenny Cline
- Dave Thornton as Gareth
- Harley Breen as fan
- Alex Papps as himself
- Lawrence Mooney as Mulligan
- Dave Graney as radio host
- Justin Hamilton as photographer
- Paul McDermott as himself
- Josh Thomas as himself
- Bill Hunter as himself
- Eddie Baroo as Thug

== See also ==
- List of Australian television series
