= Lightyear Entertainment =

American film and music distributor

- Company type: Film distributor, music distributor
- Industry: Entertainment
- Headquarters: Studio City, California, U.S.
- Key people: Arnie Holland, Sky Spooner, David Lawrence
- Products: Motion pictures, music
- Website: lightyearentertainment.com

Lightyear Entertainment, headquartered in Studio City, California, is an American distributor of independent motion pictures in theaters, on DVD, Blu-ray, video on demand, as well as a distributor of music and music videos on CD, DVD and digital distribution.

Lightyear releases movies into theaters directly. After the theatrical run, digital distribution and licensing (including VOD, EST, SVOD and TV) in North America is now conducted through MVD Distribution. Physical distribution of DVDs and BluRays is also through MVD Distribution. From 2017 through June 2023, digital distribution was conducted through The Orchard (which became 1091). From 2010 to 2018, both digital and physical releases were through eOne Distribution. From 2008 to 2010, it was through Vivendi/Universal Distribution, and from 1995 to 2008, through Warner Home Video. From 1991 to 1995, it was distributed through BMG.

Lightyear's music business in North America is conducted through Virgin Music/Universal Music Group.

Its origins were as a management buyout of RCA Video Productions, Inc. (a.k.a. RVP Productions) in 1987 from Bertelsmann, which was originally created in 1984. The company was a co-producer of the Jane Fonda workout series, and pioneered in the areas of children's and music videos, as well as helping to create the fitness genre. Lightyear is now again the distributor of the original Jane Fonda Workout videos on DVD and Digital.

Films distributed by Lightyear include Harley Flanagan: Wired for Chaos, Edge of Everything, Get Thrashed: Around the World, Tanna (nominated for the Academy Award for Best Foreign Film in 2017), Maze, Jirga, The Hippopotamus, and Goldstone. Other films include Voodoo Macbeth, a-ha: The Movie, 16 Bars and The Etruscan Smile.

Lightyear's original productions include the films Aria, Heaven and The Return of Swamp Thing, as well as the Stories to Remember series of animated films for children. It also produced concert films by Lou Reed, Eurythmics, Stevie Nicks, and Jefferson Starship, and the documentary Elvis '56.

== Films ==
Year	Title	Notes
1984	Hall & Oates: 7 Big Ones: Video Collection	
1985	Diana Ross: Vision of Diana Ross	
1987	Stevie Nicks: Live at Red Rocks	
1987	The Emerald City of Oz	
1990	Stories to Remember	
1991	Elvis: Aloha from Hawaii	
1995	People: A Musical Celebration	
1999	Aria	
2000	Rave	
2002	Under the Covers	
2003	Turn of Faith	
2003	Sistas 'N the City	
2003	The Ghosts of Edendale	
2003	Westender	
2003	Those Who Walk in Darkness	
2003	Save It for Later	
2005	Mother Goose Rocks	
2005	Poison Dust	
2005	Treasure n tha Hood	
2005	5 Card Stud	
2006	Jailbait	
2006	Kevin Hart: Live Comedy from the Laff House	
2006	Neil's Party	
2006	The Murder Game	
2007	Lou Reed: A Night with Lou Reed	
2007	Burning Annie	
2007	Short Fuse	
2007	Black Woman's Guide to Finding a Good Man	
2007	Pastor Jones: Sisters in Spirit	
2007	Everything's Jake	
2007	The Junior Defenders	
2007	Jekyll	
2008	R&B Chick	
2008	Color of the Cross 2: Resurrection	
2008	Get Thrashed	
2008	The Orange Thief	
2008	Heaven	
2008	Studio	
2008	Light and the Sufferer	
2008	Don't Touch If You Ain't Prayed 2	
2008	Killing Zelda Sparks	
2008	Battle of the Bulge	
2008	Johnson Family Christmas Dinner	
2008	Suspension	
2008	Johnson Family Dinner	
2008	Flogging Margaret	
2008	The Return of Swamp Thing	distribution rights now currently owned by Warner Bros. Pictures
2008	Pastor Jones: Sisters in Spirit	
2009	Opie Gets Laid	
2009	Saturday Morning	
2009	See Dick Run	
2009	Keepin' the Faith: My Baby's Gettin' Married!	
2009	The Moon and the Stars	
2009	The Accountant	
2009	Veritas, Prince Of Truth	
2009	Pastor Jones: Sisters in Spirit 2	
2009	Randy and the Mob	
2009	Teenage Dirtbag	
2010	The Heart is a Drum Machine	
2010	Keepin' the Faith: Momma's Got a Boyfriend	
2010	Here and There	
2010	Rocksteady: The Roots of Reggae	
2011	Laid Off	
2012	The Crossing	
2012	I'm Dickens, He's Fenster	
2013	Reality Terror Night	
2013	Thy Will Be Done	
2014	Rockin' The Wall	
2015	Jane Fonda's Original Workout	
2015	Little Glory	
2016	Me and My Mates vs the Zombie Apocalypse	
2016	Tanna	
2017	The Hippopotamus	
2018	Goldstone	
2019	Maze	
2019	The Etruscan Smile	
2020	CRSHD	
2021	Black Magic Live	
2022	a-ha: The Movie	
2022	Voodoo Macbeth	
2022	Cinematographer	
2023	The Return of Swamp Thing Remastered	
2024	Edge of Everything	
2024	Get Thrashed: Around the World	
2025	Harley Flanagan: Wired For Chaos	
