= Me and My Mates vs the Zombie Apocalypse =

- American poster
- Directed by: Declan Shrubb
- Written by: Declan Shrubb
- Produced by: Christian Doran; Daniel Sanguineti; Michael J. Watson; Christopher Wiseman
- Starring: Jim Jefferies; Adele Vuko; Alex Williamson; Andy Trieu; Matt Popp; Greg Fleet; Jackie Murray
- Cinematography: Miguel Gallagher
- Edited by: Rafael Perez
- Music by: Morgan Quinn; Declan Shrubb
- Production companies: ACT Government; Academy of Interactive Entertainment; Shoreline Entertainment; Sanguineti Media; ScreenACT; SilverSun Pictures; Solar Pictures; Gorgon Films
- Distributed by: Titan View; Lightyear Entertainment
- Release date: 24 July 2015 (Sydney, Australia)
- Running time: 90 minutes
- Country: Australia
- Language: English

Me and My Mates vs the Zombie Apocalypse is a 2015 Australian zombie comedy horror film written and directed by Declan Shrubb and developed through ScreenACT's 2012 Low Budget Feature Pod. The film stars Jim Jefferies, Alex Williamson, Adele Vuko, Greg Fleet, Andy Trieu and Matt Popp, with cameos by Eso from Bliss N Eso, Jim Punnett and The Roundabout Crew.

== Plot ==
After the zombie apocalypse occurs in Australia, two tradesmen, Darryl and Joel, meet at a telephone exchange tower to take refuge there. Joel shows Darryl that their friend Roy's undead wife is in the back of his ute, which prevents them from retrieving their beer. After an argument Darryl is forced to shoot Roy's wife in the head. Their older friend Roy meets the two there with his daughter Emma, and Darryl proceeds to poorly flirt with Emma, much to Roy's dismay.

After discussion about their plans to survive, Joel decides to fix the 3G tower to make an emergency call to the military to alert them of their location. While waiting for the tower to get fixed, Emma and Darryl become intimate, during which a firework goes off in the distance and the zombies surrounding their location migrate. At this point two strangers wearing paintballing gear enter the tower; they are revealed to be the apprentices Ryan and Lachlan, who is Emma's boyfriend. Joel fixes the phone line and talks with the military. Meanwhile, the apprentices tell the other guys that the military caused the zombie apocalypse and that calling them is the last thing they should do. The team argues and decides to split up: Joel, Roy and Darryl wish to get picked up by the military and Ryan, Lachlan and Emma decide to hide in case the military are in fact malicious. Roy begins to show symptoms that he is infected. The military jeep drives past and misses the tower. Joel goes to the roof to launch fireworks to catch the military's attention, but is killed when he accidentally ignites the entire pile of fireworks.

Two soldiers arrive but, confused by Roy's poor wording of the situation, are eaten by the hoard of zombies. A zombie picks up Joel's access card from his severed leg. The team decides to make a dash for the military's weapons and vehicle, but the zombie that grabbed the access card opens the building and the hoard begins to move in. The apprentices make a dash to drive off the hoard while Emma runs to the senior soldier's corpse to retrieve his car keys. She starts the car and grabs the apprentices, Lachlan spraining his ankle running to the car. Darryl admits to Roy that he slept with his daughter. Roy radios Emma to tell her to leave him and Darryl to die, and to set off a flare once she and the apprentices are safe.

At this point Darryl admits to Roy that he shot his wife. Roy and Darryl decide that Roy gets to Darryl on account of killing his wife and having sex with his daughter in the same afternoon. Darryl defuses the situation by showing Roy the grenade he found. They use the grenade to blow up the zombies chasing them. As the sun rises, they see another hoard coming towards them. The two have one last smoke before fighting and ultimately being overrun by the zombies. As they lie dying they see the flare Roy instructed Emma to set off once she was far away.

== Cast ==
- Jim Jefferies as Joel
- Adele Vuko as Emma
- Alex Williamson as Darryl
- Andy Trieu as Lachlan
- Matt Popp as Ryan
- Greg Fleet as Roy
- Jackie Murray as Roy's Wife
- Jim Punnett as Junior Soldier
- Brendan Kelly as Screwdriver Zombie
- Max Mackinnon as Soldier
- Dorothy Kocsi as Hysterical Towel Girl
- Glen Bunfield as Office Worker Zombie
- Shannon Bunfield as Office Worker Zombie
- Adam Spicer as Ugly Zombie
- Naomi Turvey as Athletic Girl Zombie
- Matt Leonard as Zombie Extra
- Simon Kiker as Beheaded Zombie
- Ryan Obstoy as Metalhead Zombie #2
- Brendan Farrugia as Zombie Extra
- Peter Lewry as Lawn Mower Zombie
- Lynelle O'Flaherty as Neck Gash Zombie
- Aron Rodger as Zombie Extra
- Brad Dorrington as Zombie Extra
- Leland Neville as Zombie Extra
- Ryan Croft]as Neck Gash Zombie
- Mindy Hughes as Tunnel Zombie
- Oliver Durbidge as Cyclist Zombie
- Michael Naim as Zombie Extra
- Rob Volant as Metalhead Zombie #1

== Production ==
Under its working title of Exchange, the film was one of ten projects selected out of 42 submissions to ScreenACT. The project received production funding and the production team received the benefit of a program consisting of three months of intensive development, working on script, budget, financing and distribution plans. It was one of three films chosen for production funding of $120,000 but was the only film that ended up being produced.

The project is a crowd funded feature film which was made possible through indiegogo. The team behind the film raised US$41,439 with 471 backers, surpassing their initial goal of US$30,000 and breaking the record at the time for crowdfunding an Australian feature film.

The project was shot in Canberra through January and February 2014. To raise funds for an extra day of shooting, a second indiegogo campaign was run which raised an additional US$5,000.

The completed film was released in Australian cinemas via the Tugg cinema-on-demand platform. Premiering on 24 July 2015, it became Tugg Australia's most requested film, and was featured on National 7 News for this accomplishment. It screened in every state and territory in Australia. It is distributed through their website where it can be rented or purchased. and in stores on DVD and Vimeo-on-Demand 9 September 2015. It was released on DVD in UK on 2 May 2016, through Matchbox Films, and was released in the US on 5 July 2016, by Lightyear Entertainment.

== Release ==
The film began its Australian cinema run on 24 July 2015, through the Tugg cinema-on-demand platform.

=== Home media ===
The film was released on DVD, Vimeo and other VOD platforms in Australia on 23 September 2015, available for purchase at stores such as JB Hi-Fi and Sanity. It was released in the UK on 2 May 2016 and to DVD, VOD, and digital channels in the US on 5 July 2016.

=== Festivals ===
- Official Selection of Sitges Film Festival (2015)
- Official Selection of UK Festival of Zombie Culture (2015)
- Dead Walk Fest (2016)

== Soundtrack ==
- Family Affair by Bliss n Eso
- Where the Wild Things Are by Bliss n Eso
- Sound Design by the Base recording studios Melbourne.
- Original score by Morgan Quinn, with additional music by Nick Moynihan.
