= Poison Dust =

- Directed by: Sue Harris
- Produced by: Sue Harris
- Starring: Ramsey Clark; Juan Gonzalez; Rosalie Bertell; Helen Caldicott; Michio Kaku
- Cinematography: Ellen Andors; Joe Friendly; Sue Harris; Key Martin; Elena Peckham; Artemio Perez; Lobi Redhawk; Bill Ritchy; Johnnie Stevens
- Edited by: Sue Harris
- Distributed by: Warner Bros. Lightyear Entertainment
- Release date: April 21, 2005
- Running time: 84 minutes
- Country: United States
- Language: English

Poison Dust is a 2005 American documentary film starring Ramsey Clark, Juan Gonzalez, Rosalie Bertell, Helen Caldicott, Michio Kaku and directed by Sue Harris.

== Overview ==
The film is a documentary about U.S. soldiers returning from Iraq who had been exposed to radioactive dust from dirty bombs when artillery shells coated with depleted uranium or DU are fired. Many suffer mysterious illnesses and have children with birth defects.
