= Suspension (2007 film) =

- American DVD cover
- Directed by: Alec Joler; Ethan Shaftel
- Written by: Aris Blevins; Ethan Shaftel
- Produced by: Aris Blevins; Illya Friedman; Dain Ingebretson; Kevin Obsatz; Al Ringleb; Ethan Shaftel
- Starring: Scott Cordes; Annie Tedesco
- Distributed by: Lightyear Entertainment - Warner Brothers
- Release date: 2007
- Country: United States
- Language: English

Suspension is a 2007 American science-fiction film directed by Alec Joler and Ethan Shaftel. In 2007, Suspension won the 'Spirit of the Independents' Award at the Ft Lauderdale Film Festival. It received a special opening night preview screening at the Sedona International Film Festival, and competed at the Sci Fi London Festival, the Cinequest Film Festival, and the Brussels International Festival of Fantastic Film. It was released on DVD and streaming in North America and Australia.

== Production ==
Shot on location in Eastern Kansas in 2005.

== Awards ==
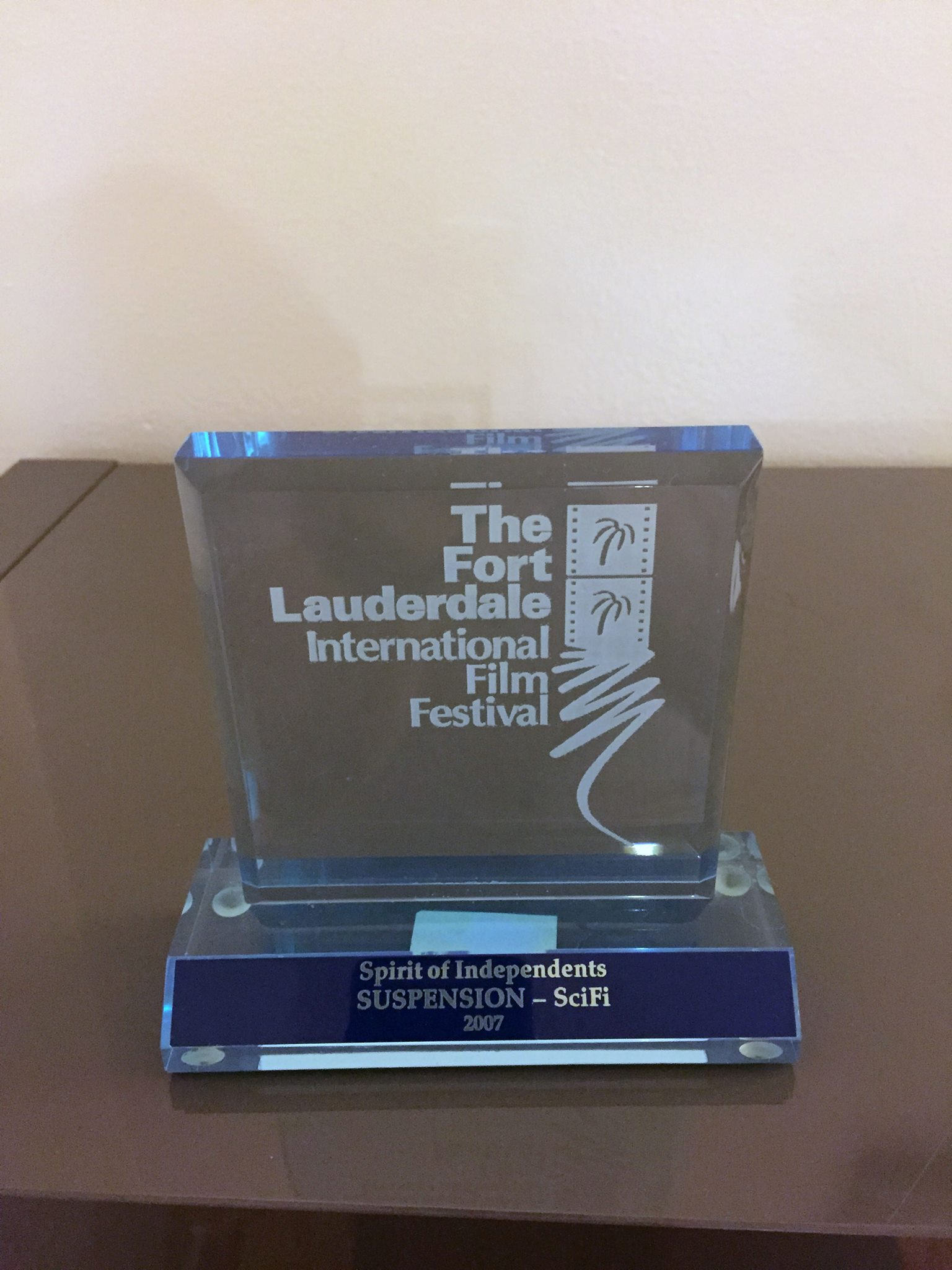
Ft Lauderdale Film Festival Spirit of the Independents Award presented to the producers of the Independent Film "Suspension" (2007)

In 2007, Suspension won the Spirit of the Independent Award at the Ft Lauderdale Film Festival.

== Reception ==
eFilmCritic.com - "An indie masterwork straight outta Kansas."

MetroActive - "Alec Joler and Ethan Shaftel's finely made science-fiction/tragic-monster story takes a well-worn gimmick—a device that can freeze time—and comes up with an intelligent new angles on it."
