= JJCC =

South Korean boy band

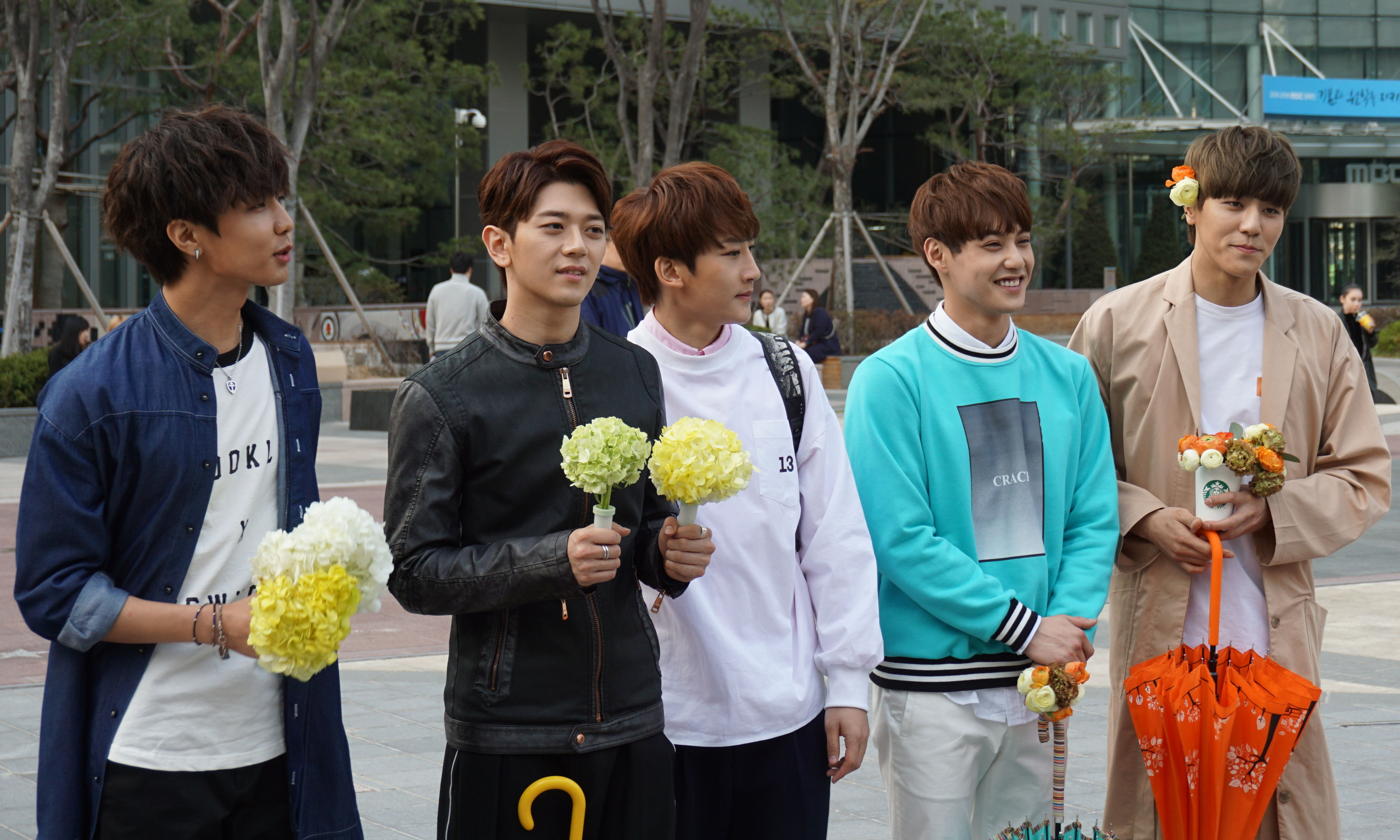
- JJCC at the Digital Media City complex, 2015

Background information
- Origin: Seoul, South Korea
- Genres: K-pop; hip hop; dance
- Years active: 2014–2021
- Labels: Jackie Chan Group Korea; Teichiku Records (Japan)
- Past members: Eddy; Yul; Zica; SimBa; San-Cheong; Prince Mak; E.Co
- Website: www.jjcc.kr

JJCC (pronounced J-J-C-C; Korean: 제이제이씨씨) is a five-member South Korean hip hop boy band formed under the management of Jackie Chan Group Korea. The group debuted on March 20, 2014, with five members: E.co, Eddy, SimBa, San-Cheong and Prince Mak who performed live on MNet M Countdown. Their debut single entitled At First was then released on March 24. JJCC is the first K-pop idol group to be formed by Jackie Chan.

== Etymology ==
The name of the band is composed of the man who forms the group and the group's aim. The first "JC" comes from the first letters of the words Jackie and Chan while the second "JC" comes from the first letters of the words join and cultures. When combined, it is literally "Jackie Chan Joint Cultures" (JJCC) translated to "Jackie Chan, let's spread K-Pop". In the same way, the pronunciation of the group name (Double-JC) stands for "Double Joy Creative" or "Let's create double the joy". The band name is a tribute to Chan as well as his effort to "join cultures" in Asia through music.

== History ==
=== Formation of the group ===
Jackie Chan is a long-time fan of K-Pop. After seeing Kpop's great potential and development, he started to form a Kpop group and even personally manages them. JJCC's aim is for the world to be conquered once Asian culture unites through their different music and charm. In preparation for this, the members of JJCC received individual training on their personality and stunts as well as improving their singing, dancing, rapping, songwriting, and acting skills. Their dance skills include popping, b-boying, and even ballet. They are also able to speak in three languages- English, Chinese, and Korean.

Together with Chan, veteran K-Pop producer-composer Choi Jun-Young is serving as the executive producer of the group while Sha-Sha Lee is the CEO of the newly formed Jackie Chan Group South Korea establishment.

=== Pre-debut ===
The group is composed of five Koreans (E.Co, Yul, Zica, SimBa, San-Cheong), one Korean American (Eddy) and one inactive Chinese Australian (Prince Mak). Eddy competed on the cooking challenge show "Master Chef Korea" once, and is known for his cooking skills. Members SimBa and Eco are also models.

Although K-Pop is still rare on the Western mainstream, the group already attracted the American media prior to their debut mainly because of Jackie Chan. They were included in major news outlets such as the New York Post and even appeared in traditional papers. Jackie Chan's presence gave JJCC a possibility for the Korean wave to enter the American mainstream.

=== 2014-2016: Debut & first years ===
On March 13, 2014, JJCC released their first teaser which was posted on their YouTube account, "Double JC". During this time, little is still known about the group except the revelation of the members and Jackie Chan as the producer-manager. One week after, on March 20, 2014, JJCC was first seen live on Mnet's M! Countdown, performing "At First" ("Everyone Is Like This At First"), which was also their official debut date. It was followed by Music Bank and Inkigayo. Finally on March 24, JJCC released their debut single as well as its music video. The song combines a melancholy hip-hop beat and a bit of R&B track. Prince Mak is not included in the music video as it is reported that he injured himself before the filming. Together with Kim Hee Sun and EXO, JJCC are performing on Chan's charity event entitled "2014 Peace, Love and Friendship" on April 6 in Beijing. The event, organized by Jaycee Chan, will have celebrities from all over the world and will include a concert, a fan meeting, launching event for ‘Jackie Chan Film Hall’ in Shanghai and more. The youngest member of the group (Maknae) San-Cheong played a small role in the Korean drama " Madame Antoine " which aired in January 2016.

=== 2017: Rumours surrounding Prince Mak's departure ===
Before the group began their Japanese promotions, there was a lot of confusion over Prince Mak's status amongst them. With JJCC's Japanese company and official Facebook page updating JJCC's bio to state that JJCC had six members, many assumed he had left the group. However, Prince Mak personally stated that he is still a member of JJCC, but is currently working on solo activities, although sources such as JJCC's official websites have stated otherwise. Since then Prince has signed to Emperor Entertainment Group Beijing for his acting activities, and JJCC has continued as a sextet.

=== 2017: Prince Mak's Departure ===
On the SBS PopAsia radio show 'The Prince Mak Hour', Prince Mak answered a fan's question about his status within JJCC. He stated that while he is not signed to JJCC's Korean agency, he still considers himself to be a JJCC member.

=== JJCC's USA Tour ===
JJCC went on tour in the US from August 6–12, 2017.

=== Produce 101 ===
San-Cheong and Yul participated in Produce 101 Season 2. Both members were eliminated in episode 5.

=== Mix Nine ===
Simba, Yul, Eddy and Zica participated in JTBC's survival show Mix Nine audition. And only Simba passed the audition, being placed 56th among the male contestants. However Simba was eliminated in episode 7 ranking 118th.

== Members ==
=== Former ===
- Simba (심바) – Rapper (2014–2021)
- Eddy (에디) – Vocalist (2014–2021)
- Yul (율) – Vocalist (2015–2021)
- Zica (지카) – Vocalist, rapper (2015–2021)
- San Cheong (산청) – Vocalist, rapper (2014–2021)
- Prince Mak (프린스 맥) – Vocalist (2014–2017)
- E.Co (이코) – Vocalist, rapper (2014–2020)

== Discography ==
=== Extended plays ===
Title	Album details	Peak chart positions	Sales
Title	Album details	KOR	Sales
JJCC 1st Mini Album	Released: August 27, 2014; Label: Jackie Chan Group Korea; Format: CD, digital download; Track listing: 1. One Way (빙빙빙); 2. You’re Going To Leave (니가 떠나간다); 3. Be Good	13	KOR: 1,863
Ackmong	Released: August 21, 2015; Label: Jackie Chan Group Korea; Format: CD, digital download; Track listing: 1. Where You At (어디야); 2. Trauma (트라우마); 3. Insomnia (불면증)	21	KOR: 1,306

=== Singles ===
Title	Year	Peak chart positions		Album
Title	Year	KOR	JPN	Album
Korean
"At First (첨엔 다 그래)"	2014	—	—	Non-album single
"One Way (빙빙빙)"	2014	—	—	JJCC 1st Mini Album
"Fire (질러)"	2015	—	—	Non-album singles
"On a Flower Bed (꽃밭에서)"	2015	—	—	Non-album singles
"Where You At (어디야)"	2015	—	—	Ackmong
"Insomnia (불면증)"	2015	—	—	Ackmong
"ToDay (오늘 한번)"	2016	—	—	Non-album singles
"Don't cry (울지마)"	2017	—	—	Non-album singles
"JJUK's HOUSE (쯕이네)"	2020	—	—	Non-album singles
Japanese
"Now (今すぐに)"	2016	—	25	Non-album releases
"Freedom"	2016	—	—	Non-album releases
"—" denotes releases that did not chart or were not released in that region.

== Tour ==
- JJCC Live Tour In America (2017)
