= Greg Fleet =

Australian writer, actor and comedian

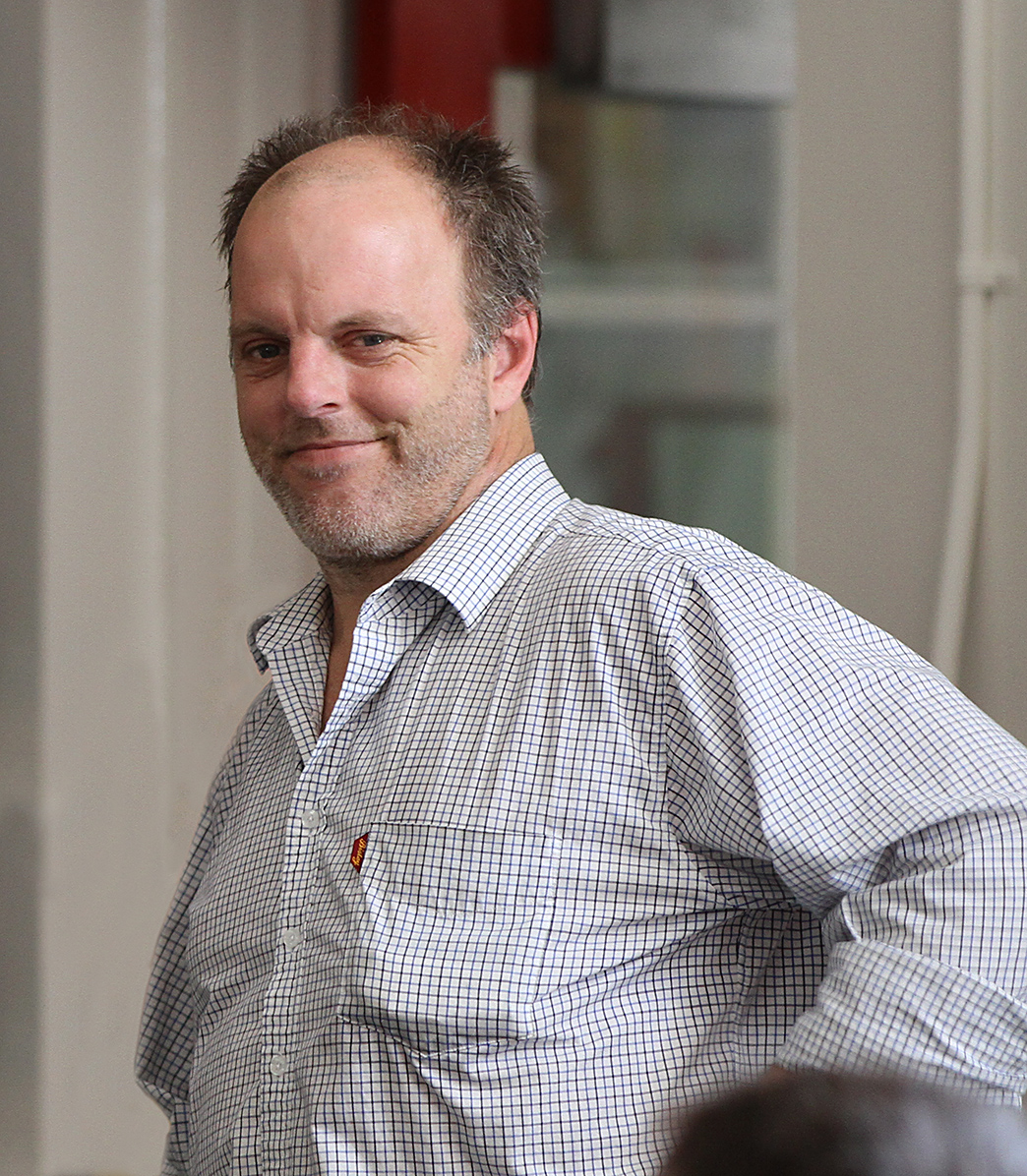
- Fleet preparing to go on stage at a Melbourne show
- Born: Gregory Fleet; 1962 (age 63–64); Michigan, U.S.
- Other name: Fleety
- Education: Geelong Grammar School

Comedy career
- Years active: 1984–present
- Genre: Stand-up comedy

Gregory Fleet (born 1962) is an Australian comedian and actor.

== Early life ==
Fleet was born in Michigan, in the United States. His father moved the family to Australia when Greg was four. He grew up in Geelong, and as a teenager boarded at Geelong Grammar School.

Fleet briefly attended Australia's National Institute of Dramatic Art (NIDA), and was in the same intake as Baz Luhrmann, but he was kicked out after a year for poor performance.

== Career ==
Fleet began his acting career in the early 1980s with several performances in Australian television series and telemovies. He appeared in Matthew and Son alongside Nicole Kidman in 1984, and then played the role of 'Delivery Man 2' in an episode of Prisoner, a role that he discussed on Tony Martin's Get This radio show in 2010, resulting in him gaining an underground fame and following as 'Delivery Man 2'.

In 1985, Fleet starred as Lt Scott Harris in biographical miniseries A Thousand Skies, about the life of aviator Sir Charles Kingsford Smith and based on Tasman Beattie's novel "The Empty Sky". He also appeared in the ABC TV police dramas Phoenix and Janus and had guest roles in The Flying Doctors and Stingers.

Fleet then took on the role of Dave Summers in long-running Australian soap opera Neighbours in 1988. His most notable storyline in the series was when his character killed the popular character of Daphne (played by Elaine Smith) in a car accident. Fleet then appeared in Australian comedy sketch show Full Frontal and was a regular on live comedy series The Big Gig.

Since then, Fleet has been a regular stand-up comedian around Australia, and has appeared on many TV and radio comedy programs, including The Comedy Channel's Stand Up Australia. He was the announcer and narrator for satirical comedy series Real Stories on Network Ten, and provided the voice of 'Sandy', the yellow labrador in TV commercials for the Home Hardware hardware store chain for 11 years.

Fleet was flown to London in 2001, to appear in Al Murray's TV sitcom Time Gentlemen Please. Back in Australia, he appeared opposite Guy Pearce and Rachel Griffiths in 2002 crime film The Hard Word, playing the role of Tony. In 2005, he had a recurring role as Boxy in comedy-drama series Last Man Standing, alongside Rodger Corser, Trevor McMahon and Matt Passmore.

Fleet was often heard on Triple M's Get This radio program, during 2006 and 2007, as a frequent guest co-host, alongside Tony Martin, Ed Kavalee, and Richard Marsland. On occasion, he filled in as a last-minute replacement guest, as he only lived a short distance away from the Triple M studio.

In 2011, Fleet commissioned a DVD containing segments of some of his best-known performances. It was sold as Bootlegs and Jumperpants and Fleet mentioned that the funds from its sale were going towards financing the filming of his classic 1995 show Thai Die, as a feature-length comedy special. It was filmed in 2011 at The Comics Lounge in Melbourne, and released in 2012.

In 2013, Fleet appeared in Underbelly: Squizzy, the sixth installment of the Underbelly franchise, playing Richard Harris, "Australia's most violent prisoner". In 2015, he starred in low-budget zombie comedy film Me and My Mates vs the Zombie Apocalypse, alongside fellow Australian comedians Jim Jefferies and Alex Williamson. The following year, he appeared in the first season of Wolf Creek, as the bikie 'Gundog'. The same year, he played fictional stand-up comedian, Bob Graffoe in Die on Your Feet, an eight-part comedy-drama, chronicling the trials and tribulations of the world of stand-up comedy, also writing the series.

In 2018, Fleet wrote and starred in a modern stage adaptation of Macbeth called Signifying Nothing, the second of his plays to win Best Theatre and Critics Choice awards at the Adelaide Fringe. In 2021, he co-wrote and acted in the play The Twins with his old school friend Ian Darling. It opened at the 2021 Adelaide Fringe Festival and won the Mental Health Awareness Award.

In 2023, Fleet played in Allan King's psychological horror film Vincent, as Micky St Peters, a drug dealing paedophile.

In mid-2024, Fleet finished writing his fourth book The Last Ride. He also finished work on a screenplay called I Know, I Know, based on his novel The Good Son. The screenplay was co-written with his partner, filmmaker Philippa Bateman.

In 2024, Fleet announced his semi-retirement from performing stand-up comedy, having appeared in 27 consecutive Melbourne International Comedy Festivals, half a dozen Edinburgh Fringe festivals and performing all over the world.

== Filmography ==
=== Film ===
Year	Title	Role	Notes	Ref.
1986	The Still Point	Tony		
2002	The Hard Word	Tony		
2009	Small World: Part One	Mick Miller	Short film	
2010	Goddess	Paul	Short film	
2014	Meter	The Uncle	Short film	
2014	The Day of the Broken	Bob		
2014	The Death of a Friend	Ugene	Short film	
2015	Me and My Mates vs the Zombie Apocalypse	Roy		
2019	Dick.	Mr Sharp	Short film	
2022	The Twins	Greg		
2023	Ratbag	Mr Jones	Short film	
2024	Vincent	Micky St Peters		

=== Television ===
Year	Title	Role	Notes	Ref.
1984	Matthew and Son (aka Ian and Dave)	Jim Finn	TV movie	
1985	Prisoner	Delivery Man	1 episode	
1985	A Thousand Skies	Lt Scott Harris	Miniseries, 1 episode	
1985; 1988	Neighbours	Dave Summers / Steve O'Donnell	9 episodes	
1986; 1989	The Flying Doctors	Mark O'Hara / Mark Irving	2 episodes	
1988	Always Afternoon	Wilhelm	Miniseries, 3 episodes	
1990	Up Yer Festival	Lt. Arnold Richboy III / Manuel Noriega	1 episode	
1993	Bingles	Pop Star	1 episode	
1993	Phoenix	Det Sgt Phil Alvin	5 episodes	
1993–1994	Full Frontal	Various roles	11 episodes	
1994	Janus	Det Sgt Alvin	2 episodes	
1994	Blue Heelers	Miller	1 episode	
2001–2002	Time Gentlemen Please	Dave	4 episodes	
2004	Stingers	Max Manton	1 episode	
2005	Last Man Standing	Boxy	8 episodes	
2006	Real Stories	Narrator	8 episodes	
2009	The Librarians	Christine's Dad	1 episode	
2013	Die on Your Feet	Bob Graffoe	8 episodes	
2013	Underbelly: Squizzy	Richard Buckley	8 episodes	
2015	Plonk	Jester	1 episode	
2016	Wolf Creek	Gundog	2 episodes	
2017	Woke	Johnny Gonzo	1 episode	
2019	Monkey Man	Miles Shuman	6 episodes	

== Books ==
Year	Title	Role	Ref.
2002	Thai Die	Random House	
2015	These Things Happen	Pan Macmillan	
2018	The Good Son	Random House	
2024	The Last Ride		

== Personal life ==
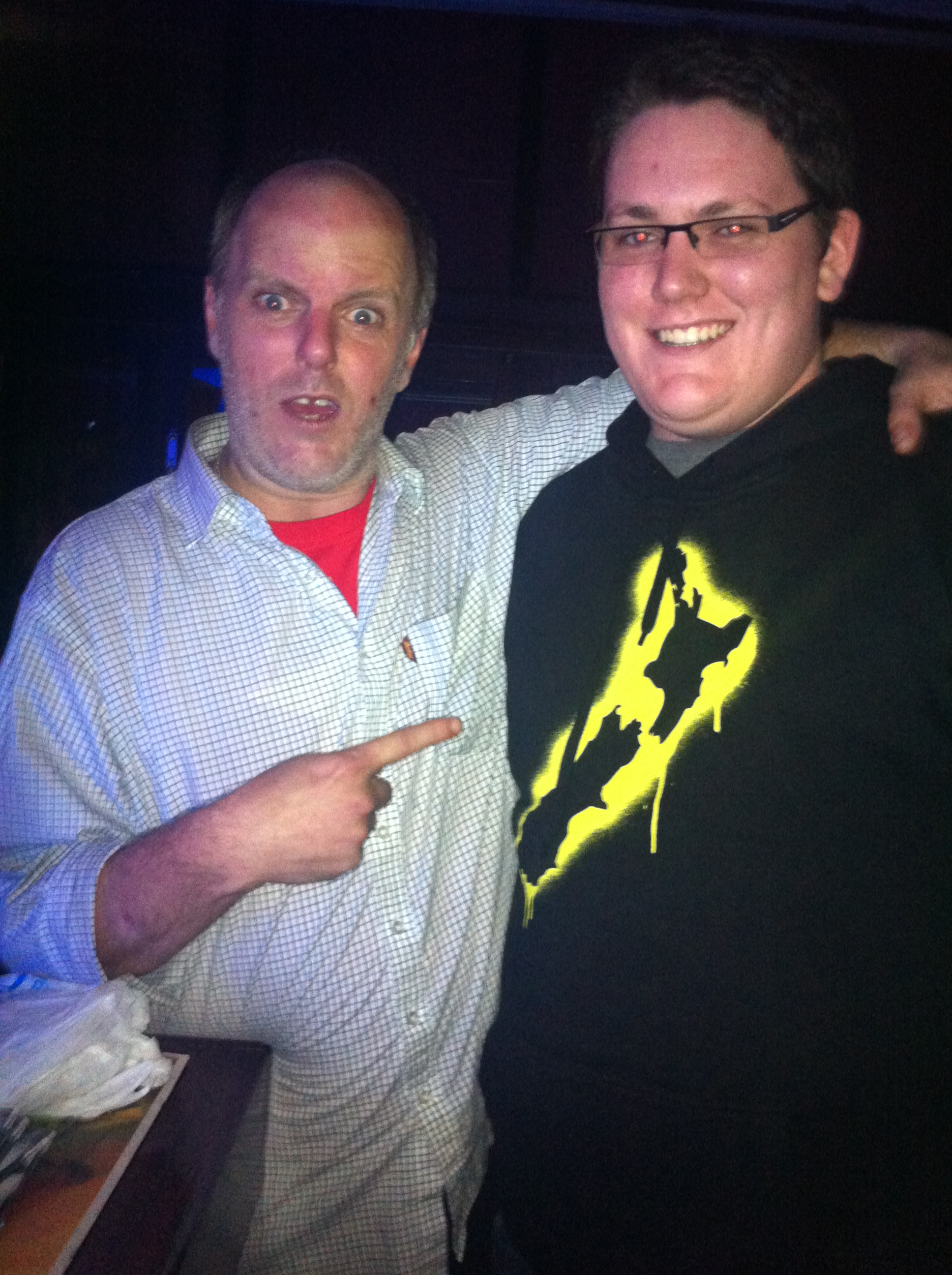
Fleet with a fan at a Melbourne club

When Fleet was ten, his father faked his own death, only to reappear later in his life. His father changed his name, married, and fathered another child during this absence, and then eventually returned to the United States. Fleet expanded upon these experiences in his live show I Wish You Were Dead.

Fleet has also fought a long battle with heroin addiction, a subject he has covered in many media interviews, his live show 10 Years in a Long Sleeved Shirt, and on the 1997 ABC television program Smallest Room in the House. In 2015, Fleet also revealed a six-month-long addiction with methamphetamine in 2005. In 2007, Fleet went into drug rehab and returned for the 2 April 2007 episode of Get This. Although Fleet had claimed to be drug-free, he admitted in an interview in April 2011, that he was stoned during that performance.

Fleet is a passionate long-distance supporter of the Hibernian Football Club of Edinburgh, Scotland.
