= The Murder Game (2006 film) =

- Directed by: Robert Harari
- Written by: Robert Harari; Jason Contino
- Produced by: Jason Contino; Robert Harari
- Starring: Steve Polites; Katie Sirk; Samuel Klein; Ariana Almajan; Vince Eustace; Max Hambleton; Kimberly Harari; Christina Marchand; Julia Pickens; Cheryl Scungi
- Cinematography: Jason Contino
- Edited by: Robert Harari; David A. Cross
- Music by: Carl Johnson
- Distributed by: Warner Bros. Lightyear Entertainment
- Release date: May 3, 2006
- Running time: 87 minutes
- Country: United States
- Language: English

The Murder Game is an American horror film starring Julia Pickens, Steve Polites, Katie Sirk and Samuel Klein. It was directed by Robert Harari. The film is distributed by Warner Bros. and Lightyear Entertainment.

Murder scenes were well accomplished and shocking from a gore perspective. A few dialogs made explicit references to several cliches of the indie horror genre in a humoristic way, but the script/plot actually provided some surprising twists. Extras include behind-the-scenes pictures that help lighten the mood after the violence of the film itself. Further behind-the-scenes details were then provided in The Murder Game: 10 Years Later (2015).

== Plot ==
A group of teenagers create a game where one of them is secretly a killer while the others are victims. Using prop weapons, the killer must eliminate the other players before being discovered. The teens sneak into a warehouse late at night to play the game but things turn horrific when the players begin dying for real.

== Awards ==
- Best Feature, Terror Film Festival (2006)
- Best Feature, Salem Independent Horror Film Festival (2006)
