= SOS (Indonesian group) =

Indonesian girl group

S.O.S
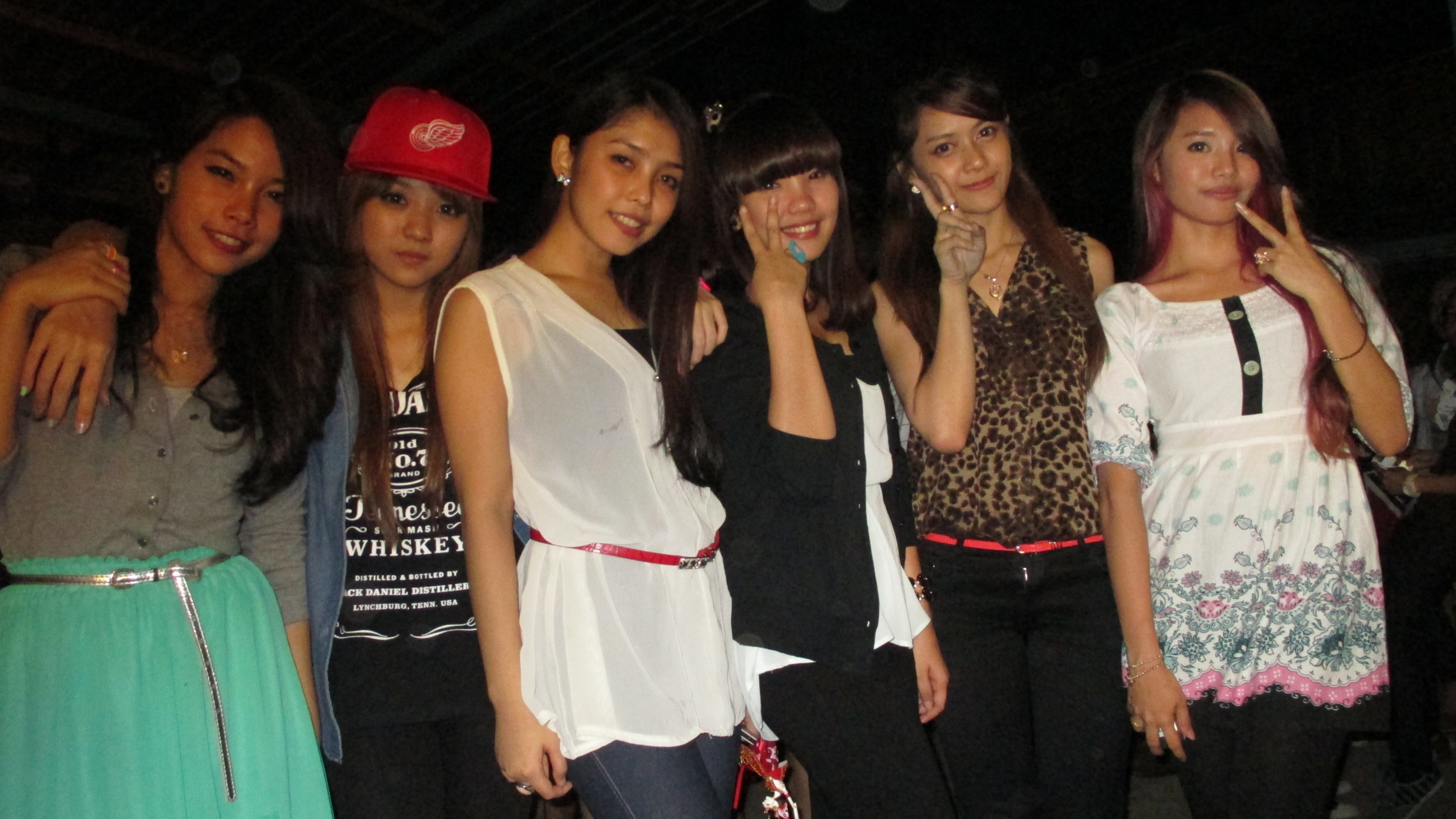
- From left to right: SUN, J.L., P.B., YeYe, Mary, A.G.

Background information
- Origin: Bandung, Indonesia
- Genres: K-pop, dance-pop, Hip hop
- Years active: 2012–2016
- Labels: YS Media Entertainment; Sony Music Entertainment
- Members: A.G. JL; Mary (leader); PB; SUN; Yeye
- Website: Official site (Korean)

S.O.S (abbreviation of Sensation of Stage) is an Indonesian girl group whose members composed of the finalists of Galaxy Superstar talent show. This group is formed by YS Media Entertainment and received training for some months from Rainbowbridge Agency, a South Korean-based K-pop Artist Incubation Company.

== Pre Debut ==
Before their debut, they were finalists in Galaxy Superstar, which aired on Indosiar TV. Two members, Mary and Yeye, qualified for the top 11 and underwent training in South Korea. In the show, Mary had to be eliminated and return to Indonesia. Yeye was left to be the member who stayed the longest in the show, although she did not win the show. After the Galaxy Superstar talent show ended, YS Media Entertainment reassembled the top 20 finalists of the Galaxy Superstar, which included Anggi, Andi Adisty, Sania, and Febrianty, plus Yeye and Mary, then dispatched the six of them in Korea to undergo training under Korea management Rainbow Bridge Agency for more than a year. They are trained in terms of vocals, dance, attitude and so on until they are ready to be debuted. In Korea, they were intensively trained in skills of vocal, dance, acting, and attitude upon debuting. Rainbow Bridge is the management that covered Anggi, Adisty, Febri, Sania, Maria and Yeye. They spent twelve hours every day (except Sundays and holidays) on vocal and dancing training.

On February 14, 2013, they finally debuted as SOS (Sensation Of Stage). The girl group put out the first mini-album called "Start Of Sensation" which consisted of 4 tracks. Their debut single is titled "Drop It Low", released in 2 versions: English and Indonesian. "Drop It Low" was also created by a well-known composer in South Korea named Seo Yong Bae. The Indonesian Lyrics Version was written by an Indonesian novelist named Valiant Budi Yogi. MV/video clip of their debut single has been broadcast in 64 countries in Asia and Europe. Their second single, titled "Independent Girl" was also released in 2 versions, English and Indonesian.

SOS consists of six members named Maria (Mary), Sania (Sun), Adisty (PB), Anggi (AG), Febrianty (JL) and Yeye (Yeye). Their fan club was given the name 911 (nine one one), synonymous with their emergency concept from their name SOS. Fans also give nicknames to each member, such as Mary (Primary), Sun (Sunshine), AG (AGorgeous), PB (PBeauty), JL (JLstars) and Yeye (Yeyeverss). SOS is the first Indonesian Girl Group, which is the result of cooperation between Indonesia and Korea under the management of YS Media Entertainment and Rainbow Bridge Agency.

== Mini album ==
The first mini-album, titled Start Of Sensation contains four tracks. The album consists of their best songs, "Drop It Low" (Indonesian and English Version) and "Independent Girl" (Indonesian and English Version). Their album concept is more directed to the Rock Girls / Bad Girls. Was seen in terms of the costumes they wore on the song "Drop it Low". Drop It Low tells the story of a woman who left her boyfriend, then she got up to go and change all the appearances for the sake of revenge against her boyfriend, because she is not old, it's sad because her boyfriend left. Whereas for Independent Girl song is the continuation of the story of the song "Drop it Low" in which she became an independent and strong woman who lived in her lover's post.

On 21 September 2013, SOS finally issued a second mini-album called The 1st Love. This album is a continuation of the story of the previous album (Start Of Sensation). In this album, the story in the song is more directed to women who are in love. Evident from the song "Tik Tok" in which the song tells of a woman waiting to fall in love again. Continued with the song "Cherry Love", where the song is a continuation of the story of the previous song "Tik Tok", which tells us that she found her other love / fell in love again. For "Show Me Love" is more directed to the story that she expects her love in reply. And, a new concept for SOS, more Girly or feminine and sexy, it is seen from the costume style changes of each member.

== Members ==
Real Name	Stage Name	Date	Position
Maria Olivia Budiman	Mary	21 December 1989	Leader, Lead Rapper, Lead Dancer, Sub-Vocalist, Visual
Sannia Arumasari	SUN	13 August 1991	Main Dancer, Sub Vocalist
Jodis Rezky Anggreny Sarira Mangiwa	A.G	1 August 1993	Lead Vocalist, Lead Dancer, Center
Andi Adisty Wahyuni Yusuf Putri Manambung	P.B	2 September 1993	Main Rapper, Sub Vocalist
Veronica Febrianty	J.L	15 February 1994	Main Vocalist
Yedi Yelia Dongoran	YeYe	31 July 1994	Lead Vocalist, Maknae

== Discography ==
=== Mini album/extended play (first) ===
Years	Mini Album #	Information	Track list
2013	Start Of Sensation	Sensation Of Stage: Released: 14 February 2013; Language: Indonesia, English; Label: Sony Music International; Format: CD, digital download	1. "Drop It Low"; 2. "Independent Girl"; 3. "Drop It Low (English version)" 4. "Independent Girl (English version)" 5. "Drop It Low(instrumental)"; 6. "Independent Girl (instrumental)"

=== Mini album/extended play (second) ===
Years	Mini Album #	Information	Track list
2013	The First Love	Sensation Of Stage: Released: 21 September 2013; Language: Indonesia, English; Label: Sony Music International; Format: CD, digital download	1. "Show me love feat Mario (Eng. Ver)"; 2. "Tik Tok (Ind. Ver)"; 3. "Cherry Love (Ind. Ver)"; 4. "Show Me Love (Instrumental)"; 5. "Tik Tok (Instrumental)"; 6. "Cherry Love (Instrumental)"

=== Single ===
Title	Year	Peak chart position		Album
Title	Year	BA	VCD	Album
"Drop It Low" Independent Girl	2013	4	1	Start One Sensation
Tik Tok Cherry Love Show me love feat Mario	2013	-	-	The First Love
"—" denotes single that did not chart or was not released.

== Videography ==
=== Music video ===
Year	Single	Director
2013	"Drop It Low"	—N/a
2013	"Independent girl"	—N/a
