= Drop It Low (S.O.S song) =

Single by S.O.S
- Released: 11 February 2013
- Genre: K-pop, synth-pop
- Length: 2:59
- Label: Sony Music Korea
- Songwriter(s): Seo Yong-bae; Hwang Sung Jin; Valiant Budi Yogi

Music video
- "Drop it Low" on YouTube

"Drop It Low" is a debut single by Indonesian K-pop girl group S.O.S, released digitally to iTunes on February 14, 2013.

== Background ==
On February 11, 2013, S.O.S released their debut EP, Start One Sensation and February 14, 2013, it was announced that the band also released their debut single, "Drop It Low" in 68 countries digitally to iTunes and the music video was aired in Arirang TV.

== Composition ==
The song was written by and composed by Seo Yong-bae. As stated by them: "The single "Drop It Low" is about a girl who stay strong in her brokenhearted. The songs written in 2 different version. Indonesian version and English version.

== Music video ==
A teaser was released on February 7, 2013, and later the music video was released on February 13, 2013. The song which chosen for the music video is the Indonesian version and featured Phantom's member Hanhae.

== Promotions ==
The music video was aired in 68 different countries by Arirang TV.

== Track listing ==
No.	Title	Lyrics	Music	Length
1.	"Drop It Low" (Indonesian version)	Vabyo, Pongki Barata	Seo Yong-bae	2:59
2.	"Drop It Low" (English version)	Vabyo, Pongki Barata	Seo Yong-bae	2:59
Total length:				5:58

== Release history ==
Region	Date	Format	Label
Australia	14 February 2013	digital download	Sony Music Korea
Belgium	14 February 2013	digital download	Sony Music Korea
France	14 February 2013	digital download	Sony Music Korea
Greece	14 February 2013	digital download	Sony Music Korea
Indonesia	14 February 2013	digital download	Sony Music Korea
India	14 February 2013	digital download	Sony Music Korea
Ireland	14 February 2013	digital download	Sony Music Korea
Italy	14 February 2013	digital download	Sony Music Korea
Malaysia	14 February 2013	digital download	Sony Music Korea
Mexico	14 February 2013	digital download	Sony Music Korea
New Zealand	14 February 2013	digital download	Sony Music Korea
Philippines	14 February 2013	digital download	Sony Music Korea
Portugal	14 February 2013	digital download	Sony Music Korea
Spain	14 February 2013	digital download	Sony Music Korea
United Kingdom	14 February 2013	digital download	Sony Music Korea
United States	14 February 2013	digital download	Sony Music Korea
