= Jim Jefferies =

Australian stand-up comedian, actor and writer

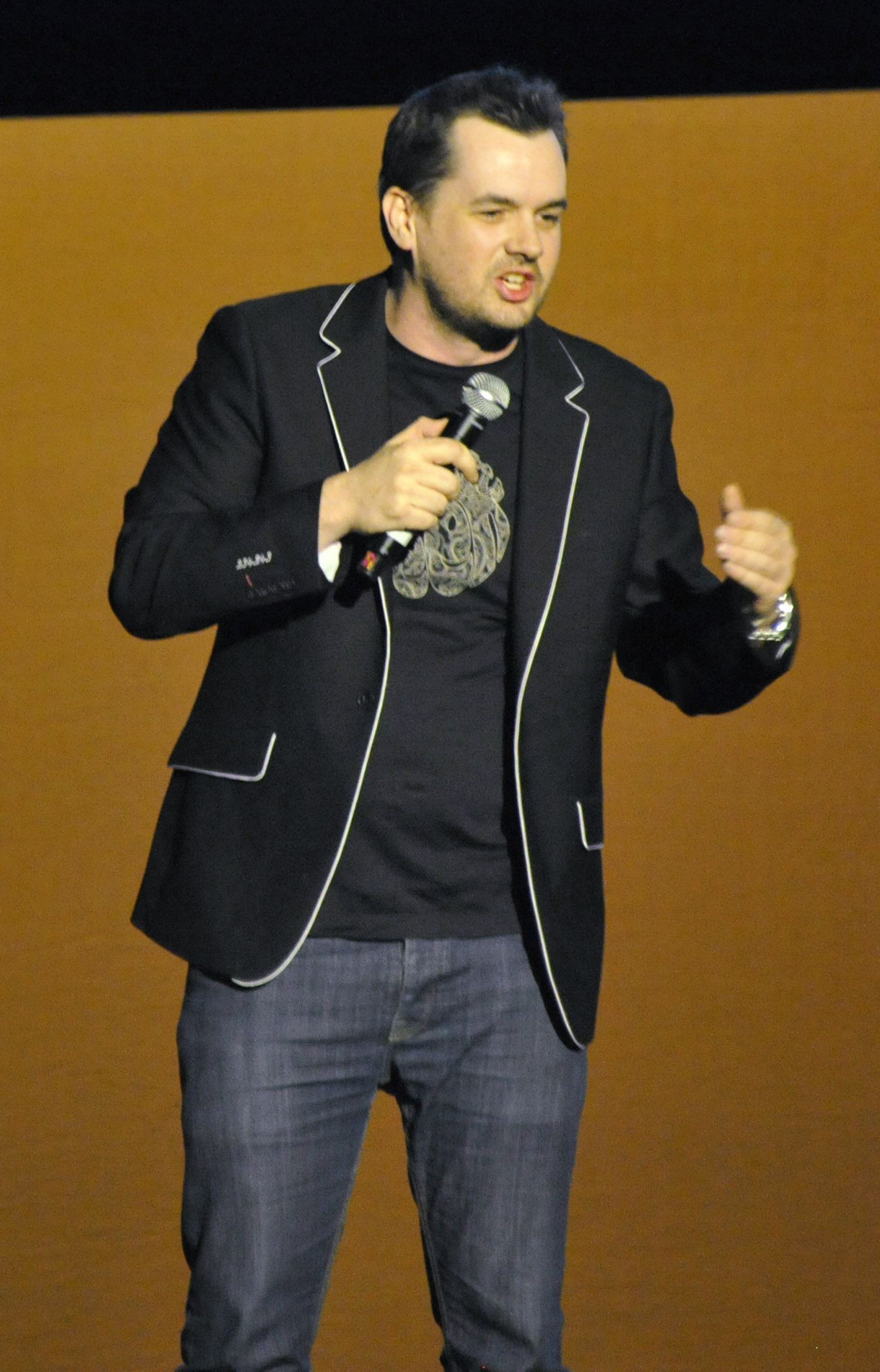
- Jefferies performing in April 2012
- Born: Geoffrey James Nugent; 14 February 1977 (age 49); Sydney, New South Wales, Australia
- Citizenship: Australia; United States
- Occupations: Comedian; actor; writer
- Spouse: Tasie Lawrence (m. 2020)
- Children: 2
- Website: jimjefferies.com

Geoffrey James Nugent (born 14 February 1977), known professionally as Jim Jefferies, is an Australian stand-up comedian, actor, and writer. He created and starred in the FX sitcom Legit (2013–2014) and the Comedy Central late-night show The Jim Jefferies Show (2017–2019). In 2023, Jefferies began hosting The 1% Club.

== Early life ==
Jefferies was born Geoffrey James Nugent in Sydney, New South Wales, Australia in February 1977. His mother worked as a teacher and his father was a cabinet maker and maintenance worker from Roma, Queensland. Jefferies grew up in St Ives, on Sydney's Upper North Shore before moving to Perth to study musical theatre and classical music at the Western Australian Academy of Performing Arts, though he left several months before graduating. He has two older brothers: Scott, an investment banker, and Daniel, an inspector in the New South Wales Police Force's Public Order and Riot Squad.

== Career ==
=== Stand-up ===
Jefferies began his stand-up comedy career after dropping out of university, initially returning to his native Sydney before relocating to the United Kingdom. He briefly performed under his birth name, Geoffrey Nugent, until an MC mispronounced his name as "Godfrey Nugget" while introducing him at a gig. He adopted the stage name Jim Jefferies, a re-working of his first and middle names shortly thereafter. He initially began performing stand-up with one-liners and changed to anecdotal humour when he began doing hour-long sets. One of his early UK appearances was in October 2003 when he performed at Birmingham's Glee Club, as a part of Birmingham Comedy Festival.

He first achieved international attention in 2007, when he was attacked onstage while performing at the Manchester Comedy Festival. Footage of the incident was incorporated into his act and can be seen on his 2008 DVD Contraband. He became known in the United States in 2009, after the release of his debut HBO special I Swear to God.

Jefferies has performed at the Edinburgh Festival Fringe, Just for Laughs, Melbourne International Comedy Festival, Reading and Leeds Festivals, and Glastonbury Festival. He has also performed routines on The World Stands Up, Comedy Blue and Edinburgh and Beyond for Comedy Central.

Following the release of his Netflix special Freedumb in July 2016, he began The Unusual Punishment Tour with all-new material, and filmed his new special This Is Me Now at the Hammersmith Apollo in London in January 2018. On 17 December 2018, he completed his Night Talker Tour with the final performance in Melbourne.

At the 2019 Just for Laughs festival, in Montreal, he was honoured as Stand-up Comedian of the Year.

April 2024 saw Jefferies start his Give 'Em What They Want tour in South Africa, moving on to Australia in August. In September and October 2024, Jefferies toured The Charm Offensive Tour across Canada, co-headlining with Jimmy Carr.

In November 2024, it was announced Jefferies will host a stand-up series for the Seven Network in 2025 titled Jim Jefferies and Friends.

=== Legit ===
Jefferies' comedy series Legit premiered on 17 January 2013 on FX. A second season premiered on 26 February 2014, having been moved to FXX. The series received positive attention among the disabled community for its portrayal of people with mental and physical disabilities. The series was cancelled after two seasons.

=== The Jim Jefferies Show ===
On 3 March 2017, Comedy Central announced The Jim Jefferies Show, a new ten-episode weekly series, that premiered on 6 June 2017. Jefferies, hosting the show, takes a look on culture and politics behind his desk, and travels around the world to tackle the week's top stories and most controversial issues. On 25 July 2017, the first season was extended with ten additional episodes, that completed airing on 21 November 2017. On 15 January 2018, Comedy Central renewed the series for a twenty-episode second season, which premiered on 27 March 2018. The network renewed the show for a third season in January 2019, which premiered on 19 March 2019. The series concluded on 19 November 2019, after the end of its third season.

=== Other work ===
From November 2010 to November 2012, Jefferies co-hosted the podcast Jim and Eddie Talkin' Shit with his fellow comedian and former roommate, Eddie Ifft. Jefferies had to quit because of his busy work schedule.

Jefferies appeared on comedy panel shows such as Never Mind the Buzzcocks, Have I Got News for You, The Heaven and Earth Show and 8 Out of 10 Cats, the US comedy panel show The Green Room with Paul Provenza and Comedy Central's @midnight. He has also been featured on various radio programmes, including BBC Radio 5 Live's Saturday morning sports show, Opie and Anthony, and Fighting Talk.

In 2015, he starred in Australian film Me and My Mates vs the Zombie Apocalypse with comedians Greg Fleet and Alex Williamson. It premiered on 25 July and was released on DVD and Vimeo in Australia and New Zealand in late 2015, and in the UK, Ireland, and the US in 2016.

In 2019, Jefferies and Suzanne Martin developed the sitcom Jefferies for NBC, in which Jefferies will star as a fictionalized version of himself.

Jefferies has hosted the I Don't Know About That podcast alongside Kelly Blackheart, Forrest Shaw, and Jack Hackett since May 2020.

Jefferies began a new podcast At This Moment with co-host Amos Gill on January 21, 2025.

In September 2025, Jefferies was scheduled to perform at the Riyadh Comedy Festival. Jefferies defended his decision to participate on Theo Von's podcast: "There's been a reporter who they killed. You don't think our government has fucking bumped people? I think Jeffrey Epstein was fucking bumped off" and that it is "not a fucking hill that I'm gonna die on." Following these comments, Jefferies was removed from the festival's lineup, and his representatives did not respond to inquiries about the change.

== Personal life ==
Jefferies lives in Studio City, California. He was previously in a relationship with actress Kate Luyben. Their son was born in 2012. He married English actress Tasie Lawrence in September 2020. Their son was born in 2021.

Jefferies is an atheist. He was diagnosed as autistic and states he only found out at the age of 36. In 2018, he became a naturalised American citizen.

== Filmography ==
=== Film ===
Year	Title	Role	Notes
2014	Me and My Mates vs the Zombie Apocalypse	Joel	
2016	Punching Henry	Charlie	
2017	Killing Hasselhoff	Tommy	
2021	Extinct	Burnie	Voice role
2025	Him	Marco	

=== Television ===
Year	Title	Role	Notes
2004	The Last Chancers	Whoppit	Episode: 1x01
2007	Comedy Cuts	Various	
2008	Jim Jefferies: Contraband	Himself	Stand-up special
2009	Jim Jefferies: I Swear to God	Himself	Stand-up special
2010	Jim Jefferies Alcoholocaust	Himself	Stand-up special
2012	Jim Jefferies: Fully Functional	Himself	Stand-up special
2013	Tainted Love	Priest	
2013–2014	Legit	Jim Jefferies	Also creator, writer and executive producer; 26 episodes
2014	Bad Judge	Keith	Episode: "The Cat's Out of the Bag"
2014	The Librarians	British Santa	Episode: "And Santa's Midnight Run"
2014	Jim Jefferies: Bare	Himself	Stand-up special
2016	Not Safe with Nikki Glaser	Himself	Guest (2 episodes)
2016	Jim Jefferies: Freedumb	Himself	Stand-up special
2017–2019	The Jim Jefferies Show	Himself	Host; also creator, writer and executive producer; 57 episodes
2018	Jim Jefferies: This Is Me Now	Himself	Stand-up special
2020	Jim Jefferies: Intolerant	Himself	Stand-up special
2021	History of Swear Words	Himself	5 episodes
2023	Jim Jefferies: High & Dry	Himself	Stand-up special
2023–present	The 1% Club	Host	Game show
2025	The Snake	Host	Reality show
2025	Jim Jefferies: Two Limb Policy	Himself	Stand-up special
2027	I’m a Celebrity…Get Me Out of Here!	Host	Alongside Ricki-Lee Coulter

== Discography ==
- 2008: Hell Bound (CD)
- 2008: Contraband (DVD)
- 2009: I Swear to God (video download)
- 2010: Alcoholocaust (DVD)
- 2012: Fully Functional (video download/DVD)
- 2014: Bare (video download)
- 2016: Freedumb (video download)
- 2018: This Is Me Now (Netflix)
- 2020: Intolerant (Netflix)
- 2023: High & Dry (Netflix)
- 2025: Two Limb Policy (Netflix)
