= 1991 Australian Film Institute Awards =

Australian film and TV awards ceremony

33rd Australian Film Institute Awards

Highlights
- Best Film: Proof
- Most awards: Film: Proof (6); TV: Police Rescue (3)
- Most nominations: Film: Spotswood (9); TV: Police Rescue (9)

The 33rd Australian Film Institute Awards (generally known as the AFI Awards) were held in October 1991. Presented by the Australian Film Institute (AFI), the awards celebrated the best in Australian feature film, documentary, short film and television productions of 1991. Proof received the award for Best Feature Film and five other awards. Director Fred Schepisi received the Raymond Longford Award for lifetime achievement. The awards were not televised.

== Winners and nominees ==
Winners are listed first and highlighted in boldface.

=== Feature film ===
Best Feature Film	Best Achievement in Direction
**Proof – Lynda House**; Death in Brunswick – Timothy White; Dingo – Giorgio Draskovic, Rolf de Heer, Marc Rosenberg, Marie-Pascale Osterrieth; Spotswood – Timothy White, Richard Brennan	**Jocelyn Moorhouse – Proof**; John Ruane – Death in Brunswick; Rolf de Heer – Dingo; Jackie McKimmie – Waiting
Best Performance by an Actor in a Leading Role	Best Performance by an Actress in a Leading Role
**Hugo Weaving – Proof**; Sam Neill – Death in Brunswick; Colin Friels – Dingo; Ben Mendelsohn – Spotswood	**Sheila Florance – A Woman's Tale**; Angie Milliken – Act of Necessity; Eri Ishida – Aya; Genevieve Picot – Proof
Best Performance by an Actor in a Supporting Role	Best Performance by an Actress in a Supporting Role
**Russell Crowe – Proof**; Chris Haywood – Aya; John Moore – Deadly; Alwyn Kurts – Spotswood	**Fiona Press – Waiting**; Gosia Dobrowolska – A Woman's Tale; Toni Collette – Spotswood; Helen Jones – Waiting
Best Screenplay	Best Achievement in Cinematography
**Jocelyn Moorhouse – Proof**; Paul Cox, Barry Dickins – A Woman's Tale; John Ruane, Boyd Oxlade – Death in Brunswick; Max Dann, Andrew Knight – Spotswood	**Ellery Ryan – Spotswood**; Geoff Burton – Aya; Ellery Ryan – Death in Brunswick; Denis Lenoir – Dingo
Best Achievement in Editing	Best Achievement in Sound
**Ken Sallows – Proof**; Suresh Ayyar – Dingo; Nicholas Beauman – Spotswood; Michael Honey – Waiting	**Henri Morelle, Ashley Grenville, James Currie – Dingo**; Bernard Aubouy, Dean Gawen, Roger Savage – Isabelle Eberhardt; Lloyd Carrick, Glenn Newnham, Roger Savage – Proof; Gary Wilkins, Tim Jordan, Phil Judd – Till There Was You
Best Music Score	Best Achievement in Production Design
**Michel Legrand, Miles Davis – Dingo**; Paul Grabowsky – A Woman's Tale; Roger Mason – Aya; Michael Atkinson – Stan and George's New Life	**Chris Kennedy – Spotswood**; Jennie Tate – Aya; Peta Lawson – Deadly; Bryce Perrin, Geoffroy Larcher – Isabelle Eberhardt
Best Achievement in Costume Design
**Tess Schofield – Spotswood**; Jennie Tate – Aya; Mic Cheminal – Isabelle Eberhardt; Murray Picknett – Waiting

=== Non-feature film ===
Best Documentary	Best Short Film
**Canto A La Vida – Lucia Salinas Briones (director)**; Chainsaw – Shirley Barrett (director); Cowboy, Maria In Town – Les McLaren, Annie Stiven (director); Eclipse Of The Man-Made Sun – Nicolette Freeman, Amanda Stewart (director)	**The Tennis Ball – John Dobson (director)**; A Horse With Stripes – Andrew O'Sullivan (director); Puppenhead – David Cox (director); The Man In The Blue And White Holden – Peter Luby (director)
Best Animation Film	Best Screenplay in a Short Film
**Union Street – Wendy Chandler (director)**; Feral Television – David Ledwich (director); Reaper Madness – Nick Donkin (director); Two Fish – Rohan Smith (director)	**Plead Guilty, Get A Bond – Ben Lewin**; A Horse With Stripes – Andrew O'Sullivan; Sure Thing – Jacquelin Perske; The Man In The Blue And White Holden – Peter Luby
Best Achievement in Cinematography in a Non-Feature Film	Best Achievement in Editing in a Non-Feature Film
**And A Fire Engine To Go With The Dog – Brendan Lavelle**; As The Mirror Burns – Mandy Walker; Donald Friend: The Prodigal Australian – Tony Wilson, Terry Carlyon; On The Border Of Hopetown – Nino Gaetano Martinetti	**Donald Friend: The Prodigal Australian – Tim Lewis**; Eclipse Of The Man-Made Sun – Diana Priest; Puppenhead – Graeme Jackson; The Tennis Ball – Melanie Sandford
Best Achievement in Sound in a Non-Feature Film
**Chainsaw – Victor Gentile**; As Happy As Larry – Tony Vaccher, John Dennison; As The Mirror Burns – Gretchen Thornburn, Paul Huntingford, Dean Gawen; Puppenhead – David Cox, Graeme Jackson

=== Television ===
Best Episode in a Television Drama Series or Serial	Best Television Mini-Series or Telefeature
**Embassy, Series 2 – Episode 1, 'A Human Dimension' (ABC) – Alan Hardy**; Police Rescue, Season 1 – Episode 2, 'Angel After Hours' (ABC) – Sandra Levy, John Edwards; Police Rescue, Season 1 – Episode 13, 'By The Book' (ABC) – Sandra Levy, John Edwards; The Boys From The Bush, Season 1 – Episode 8 (Seven Network) – Jane Scott, Verity Lambert	**The Paper Man (ABC) – Sue Masters, Greg Ricketson**; Ratbag Hero (Seven Network) – Zelda Rosenbaum, Oscar Whitbread; Ring of Scorpio (Nine Network) – Errol Sullivan; Shadows of the Heart (Network Ten) – Jan Marnell
Best Performance by an Actor in a Leading Role in a Television Drama	Best Performance by an Actress in a Leading Role in a Television Drama
**Gary Sweet – Police Rescue, Season 1 – Episode 1, 'Mates' (ABC)**; Steve Bastoni – Police Rescue, Season 1 – Episode 2, 'Angel After Hours' (ABC); Nico Lathouris – Police Rescue, Season 1 – Episode 2, 'Angel After Hours' (ABC); Cameron Nugent – More Winners – 'The Big Wish' (ABC)	**Sonia Todd – Police Rescue, Season 1 – Episode 13, 'By The Book' (ABC)**; Janet Andrewartha – Embassy, Season 2 – Episode 1, 'A Human Dimension' (ABC); Pat Bishop – The Paper Man (ABC); Josephine Byrnes – Shadows of the Heart (Network Ten)
Best Achievement in Direction in a Television Drama	Best Screenplay in a Television Drama
**Mark Callan – Embassy, Series 2 – Episode 1, 'A Human Dimension' (ABC)**; Esben Storm – More Winners – 'The Big Wish' (ABC); Michael Jenkins – Police Rescue, Season 1 – Episode 2, 'Angel After Hours' (ABC); Peter Fisk – Police Rescue, Season 1 – Episode 13, 'By The Book' (ABC)	**Peter Schreck – Police Rescue, Season 1 – Episode 2, 'Angel After Hours' (ABC)**; Anne Lucas – Embassy, Season 2 – Episode 1, 'A Human Dimension' (ABC); Steve J. Spears – More Winners – 'The Big Wish' (ABC); Keith Aberdein, John Lonie – The Paper Man (ABC)
Best Children's Television Drama	Best Television Documentary
**Round the Twist, Season 1 – Episode 8, 'Wunderpants' (Seven Network) – Antonia Barnard**; More Winners – 'Mr Edmund' (ABC) – Anthony Buckley; More Winners – 'The Big Wish' (ABC) – Antonia Barnard; Round The Twist, Season 1 – Episode 4, 'Cabbage Patch Fib' (Seven Network) – Antonia Barnard	**Guns And Roses (ABC) – John Moore, Helen Bowman**; The Shadow Over East Timor (SBS) – James Kesteven, Mandy King; When Friends Were Enemies (SBS) – Judy Menczel; You Must Remember This (ABC) – Susan Mackinnon, Helen Bowden

=== Additional awards ===
AFI Members Prize	Cerficate of Merit for Best Juvenile Performance
**Proof – Lynda House**	**Lauren Hewett – Act of Necessity (ABC)**
Raymond Longford Award	Byron Kennedy Award
**Fred Schepisi**	**John Duigan**
