= Spellbinder: Land of the Dragon Lord =

1997 fantasy adventure television series

- Genre: Adventure, fantasy, science fiction
- Created by: Mark Shirrefs; John Thomson
- Directed by: Noel Price
- Starring: Lauren Hewett; Anthony Wong; Ryan Kwanten; Leonard Fung; Heather Mitchell
- Music by: Ian Davidson
- Countries of origin: Australia; Poland; China
- Original languages: English; Polish; Mandarin
- No. of series: 1
- No. of episodes: 26

Production
- Executive producer: Kris Noble
- Producers: Janusz Czech; Denis Kiely
- Cinematography: Danny Batterham
- Editor: Pippa Anderson
- Running time: 24 minutes

Original release
- Network: Nine Network (Australia); TVP2 (Poland)
- Release: 1 September – 24 October 1997

Related
- Spellbinder

Spellbinder: Land of the Dragon Lord is a fantasy adventure /science fiction television series, and a sequel to Spellbinder. Both series deal with travelling between parallel universes. It was also novelised by the creators, Mark Shirrefs and John Thomson.

The series was filmed on location in Australia ("Kathy's world" and another parallel world similar to hers), China ("Sun's world") and Poland ("Ashka's world", as well as two other parallel universes). The show was a joint production between studios in the three countries, although the script and concept came from Australia, and the spoken language is English.

The series is fast-paced and there are usually new challenges for the characters in each episode, which are solved through cleverness and wits. As with most children's shows, most of the adventure is headed by children (Kathy is in her middle-teens), although Ashka, Kathy's parents, and the scientist Mek are adults.

In 1997, Spellbinder: Land of the Dragon Lord represented Australia in the finals of The New York Festivals international television programming and promotion competition in the Children's Programs (Ages 7–12) category.

== Plot ==
When Kathy decides to explore an unusual boat that she discovers next to a lake, she is accidentally pulled from her home in Australia into a parallel universe. The new world she finds herself in is populated by ethnic Chinese, who possess advanced technology, including a talking computer called the "Oracle" that runs the empire.

Kathy spends most of her time trying to evade dangerous people in different parallel worlds, return to her own world, and reunite with her family. She is further antagonised by Ashka, a cunning and manipulative woman who has escaped from prison in her own world (for her crimes in the first series) and who seeks to gain advantage for herself.

The series also depicts a journey Sun takes to Kathy's world, where he is no longer protected by his empire, and people do not respect his authority.

== Filming locations ==
=== Land of the Immortals ===
Filmed in Poland, most of it in Nieborów, with the Arkadia palace serving as Lem's and Guin's residence, and the Temple of Diana in the palace's park as the Doctor Elvo's home. The scenes in which Kathy is being taken to school were filmed in the Old Town of Warsaw and Łazienki Park.

=== Land of the Moloch ===
Parts of the series were shot on location in Poland, with the Wieliczka Salt Mine used for underground locations, while the village and the scrap yard were filmed near Kraków.

== Cast and characters ==
Kathy, Mek and Ashka in The Land of the Dragon Lord (book cover)

Kathy and Automatons in The Land of Immortals (book cover)

=== Main cast ===
- Lauren Hewett as Kathy Morgan – about to turn fifteen years old, she is slightly spoiled and vain and is reluctant to go camping. Swooning over Tony Lazzi, their neighbour and star on a soap, Kathy accidentally ends up in the Land of the Dragon Lord after playing around with Mek's boat. Upset at first, Kathy soon adjusts to her new life, but begins to resent Sun after he tells her to stay forever. She helps Ashka escape from the Spellbinder world, but after that will swing loyalty with her, sometimes helping her, sometimes not helping her. Beyond that, Kathy is almost like a female version of Paul from the first series, but she does not have the scientific knowledge or military skills that Paul does. Kathy instead relies on acting skills. Most of her planning is often co-worked with her family or with Mek. She is the only person to see six worlds, including her own: Australia, Australia 2 (Kathy-2), Land of the Dragon Lord, the Immortal World, the Spellbinder World and the Land of the Moloch.
- Anthony Wong as Mek – the first person from the Land of the Dragon Lord who Kathy meets. He is the inventor of the trans-dimensional bamboo boat, which is how Kathy and her family end up in the parallel world. His original invention was meant to be musical jewels, but they failed. Working at the scholastery, Mek is a bit like a father figure in a way towards Kathy, helping her adjust to life in the Land of the Dragon Lord. It is also implied that he has a crush on Aya.
- Ryan Kwanten as Josh Morgan – a sixteen years old, he is Kathy's jock brother. While he and Kathy treat each other like brothers and sisters normally do, he cares very much for his sister and is the only person to actually see Kathy disappear. When he and his family end up in the Land of the Dragon Lord, Josh gets separated from them early and befriends Jasmine, an entertainer. He falls for her and the two share a brief kiss in the series. Beyond that, Josh is more like Paul Reynolds in the first series in that he is athletic and resourceful but is much less proficient in science. He can also create a good lie on the spot.
- Leonard Fung as Sun, The Dragon Lord – a spoiled brat at first, Sun is the first Dragon Lord. He is easily bored and relies heavily on the "Oracle" and his guards to take care of matters. When Ashka meets him, Sun takes an instant dislike to her, while befriending Kathy, until he makes her his eternal companion. After Ashka rescues Sun from Sharak and his barbarians, he makes Ashka his vizer, though he treats her like a playmate. When Ashka maroons him in Kathy's world however, Sun is lost and confused, not knowing what to do. He soon adjusts, helping Kathy recover the boat and get back, but everyone believes he is dead. This is played throughout the first half of the series and works to Sun's advantage, as he is able to move around successfully without being captured.
- Heather Mitchell as Ashka – a former Spellbinder and the main antagonist of the series. When Kathy and Mek arrive in the Spellbinder world, she tricks them into helping her escape a labour camp and travels with them to the Land of the Dragon Lord. After she saves Sun from Sharak and his barbarians, Sun makes Ashka his advisor, though he treats her like a playmate. Desperate to get rid of Sun, Ashka maroons him in Kathy's world, and lies to Aya that a monster killed Sun. Ashka then becomes the advisor to Aya, and controls the 'Oracle' behind her back. At the end of the series, Ashka is marooned in another world.
- Ye Mang (Chinese Name“周野芒”）as Sharak – the leader of a group of barbarians, Sharak's people are hungry and want food. Sun refuses and sends out his Oracle hologram warrior to defeat them. It works well, but Sharak does not give up, recruiting Ashka (who he believes is a magician, who can help him conquer the Land of the Dragon Lord) and at one point, Josh, Sharak's army manage to invade the Land of the Dragon Lord. Being very superstitious, Sharak enlists in the help of a diviner to make sure that everything is all right according to the stars and to banish ghosts from the palace and cleanse items. He also learns to use Ashka's power suit and drive the Morgan family's Jeep. Sharak makes himself self-appointed Lord and forces Aya to marry him. At the last minute, however, Ashka takes Aya's place and becomes Sharak's bride. Eventually, the barbarian villagers end up in the Land of the Moloch, where they are given a new home, while Sharak and his commanders are exiled and forbidden to return.
- Lenore Smith as Vicky Morgan – the mother of Kathy and Josh, Vicky is arachnophobic and is a computer consultant. She appears a little more frail compared to Carl, who can survive without food or water a little bit longer. In the Land of the Dragon Lord, her role is mostly that of supplies and providing diversions for Sun and Aya, but beyond that her role is somewhat minor.
- Peter O'Brien as Carl Morgan – Kathy and Josh's father, Carl is an ex-pro footballer who injured his knee and now owns a shop called "Crazy Carl's Sporting and Army Surplus Store". He does not believe Josh at first and when he drives into the Land of the Dragon Lord, tries to get help from Sharak, without realising his true intent. He is eventually reunited with his children and wife and becomes like a surrogate father to Sun, Aya and Jasmine. Mostly driving, he teaches Sharak how to drive his 'carriage' (actually the Morgan family's jeep), and handles the driving in and out of the Dragon Lord world. He cares very much for his wife and children and has some basic military skills, like tactics and being able to use a convincing disguise.
- Hu Xin as Princess Aya – Sun's older sister, Aya was meant to be the Dragon Lord, but she was injured in an accident which killed their parents. Sun was made the Dragon Lord while she recovered. She is very gentle and kind to others, regardless of their status and usually manages to keep Sun under control. She takes a great liking to Kathy when she arrives, then the Morgan family. When Jasmine was made a hide-tanner, Aya was the one who made Jasmine's dream come true. She becomes the Dragon Lord after she believes that Sun is dead. She remains the Dragon Lord from this point onwards. After the defeat of Sharak and his barbarians, Aya and Sun decide to rule the Land of the Dragon Lord together.
- Gui Jielan as Jasmine – a 15-year-old girl from the village of Fin, Jasmine is somewhat superstitious, believing in water spirits and such, even mistaking Josh for one when she first sees him. Her goal in life is to be an entertainer and she uses one of the water spirit's three wishes to try to achieve this goal. When the wish fails at first, Jasmine is angry at Josh and thinks he is a demon (when Josh reveals to the villagers that he is a human and not a water spirit, they misunderstood he is a demon). Jasmine however forgives Josh and accepts his apology. She is soon rescued by his parents and eventually the wish does manifest, but not in the way that Jasmine or Josh imagined. She has a romantic interest in Josh and kisses him in the final episode of the series. She plays the flute and can sing and dance, this often makes a good distraction.

=== Recurring cast ===
- Geng Baosheng as the Diviner
- Andrzej Dębski as Tad
- Lech Dyblik as the Arbiter
- Andrzej Grabowski as Gan
- Aleksandra Kisielewska as Thalia
- Katarzyna Laniewska as Elin
- Lech Mackiewicz as Dr. Elvo
- Maria Mackiewicz as Mel
- Agnieszka Michalska as the Apprentice
- Jowita Miondlikowska as Mala
- Cezary Morawski as Hugo
- Wenanty Nosul as Lem
- Bartosz Obuchowicz as the Boy
- Justin Rosniak as Tony
- Iwona Rulewicz as Leila
- Adam Siemion as Jez
- Monika Świtaj as the Mother
- Wojciech Szawul as Guard
- Katarzyna Walter as Guin
- Ye Xiaokeng as Gobbo
- Wang Ya'nan as Roggar
- Andrzej Żółkiewski as the Spellbinder
- Rafał Zwierz as Gryvon
- Angela Keep as Susan

== Episodes ==
No.	Title	Directed by	Written by	Original release date
1	"The Trans-Dimensional Bamboo Boat"	Noel Price	Mark Shirrefs and John Thomson	1 September 1997
2	"Ashka"	Noel Price	Mark Shirrefs and John Thomson	2 September 1997
3	"The Dragon Lord"	Noel Price	Mark Shirrefs and John Thomson	3 September 1997
4	"Oracle"	Noel Price	Mark Shirrefs and John Thomson	8 September 1997
5	"Marooned in a World of Monsters"	Noel Price	Mark Shirrefs and John Thomson	9 September 1997
6	"Attack of the Thirty-Metre Warrior"	Noel Price	Mark Shirrefs and John Thomson	10 September 1997
7	"Josh, the Water Spirit"	Noel Price	Mark Shirrefs and John Thomson	15 September 1997
8	"Sun Becomes a Star"	Noel Price	Mark Shirrefs and John Thomson	16 September 1997
9	"Designation Day"	Noel Price	Mark Shirrefs and John Thomson	17 September 1997
10	"The Oracle is Dead"	Noel Price	Mark Shirrefs and John Thomson	22 September 1997
11	"The Only Child in the World"	Noel Price	Mark Shirrefs and John Thomson	23 September 1997
12	"Girl for Sale"	Noel Price	Mark Shirrefs and John Thomson	24 September 1997
13	"To Live Forever"	Noel Price	Mark Shirrefs and John Thomson	29 September 1997
14	"Barbarians at the Gate"	Noel Price	Mark Shirrefs and John Thomson	30 September 1997
15	"The Best-Laid Plans..."	Noel Price	Mark Shirrefs and John Thomson	1 October 1997
16	"Graveyard of Machines"	Noel Price	Mark Shirrefs and John Thomson	6 October 1997
17	"The Hunter and the Haunting"	Noel Price	Mark Shirrefs and John Thomson	7 October 1997
18	"Stop the Moloch!"	Noel Price	Mark Shirrefs and John Thomson	8 October 1997
19	"Escape from the Palace"	Noel Price	Mark Shirrefs and John Thomson	13 October 1997
20	"Kathy Meets... Herself"	Noel Price	Mark Shirrefs and John Thomson	14 October 1997
21	"The Doublecross"	Noel Price	Mark Shirrefs and John Thomson	15 October 1997
22	"On The Trail"	Noel Price	Mark Shirrefs and John Thomson	20 October 1997
23	"The Two Joshes"	Noel Price	Mark Shirrefs and John Thomson	21 October 1997
24	"Who's Who?"	Noel Price	Mark Shirrefs and John Thomson	22 October 1997
25	"The Disappearing Act"	Noel Price	Mark Shirrefs and John Thomson	23 October 1997
26	"A Wedding Surprise"	Noel Price	Mark Shirrefs and John Thomson	24 October 1997

== International showings ==
The original Spellbinder series was first shown in the US in 1996 on The Disney Channel, joining with an earlier Australian science fiction series called Ocean Girl. However, after 1997 The Disney Channel decided not to get the 2nd season, as well as renewing Ocean Girl (which Disney helped finance OG seasons 2 and 3). However, Spellbinder: Land of the Dragon Lord was picked up by the FOX Family Channel and the series started airing on 15 August 1998 with the channel's launch. FOX Family Channel cancelled the show shortly afterward. Although FOX Family Channel had said that they would show all the episodes later on, they never did. However, its spin-off network girlzChannel resumed the series when it launched in October 1999, running the series until May 2000. In 2019 Retro Television began airing the complete series

It was shown on satellite and cable channel The Children's Channel in the United Kingdom and terrestrially in Ireland on RTÉ Two in 1998.

It was shown in Sri Lanka by the state-owned Rupavahini with Sinhala sub-titles and under the name "මායා බන්ධන", which is the literal translation of "Spellbinder". It became an instant hit among the kids and teens and is still cherished by many in nostalgia.

The series was also aired in Bangladesh by Bangladesh Television.

The series started in Russia in 1998. Different channels were showing Spellbinder 1 and 2 several times.

In France and Mauritius, it was aired as "Les Maîtres des Sortilèges" (The masters of spells)

In Finland, the show aired in 1998 on Yle TV1 as Lohikäärmekuninkaan maa ("Land of the Dragon King").

It was also aired in Sweden.

== DVD release ==
The DVD set was made available on Friday 4 May 2007, and contains the entire series over 4 discs.
