= Act of Necessity =

- Written by: Pamela Williams
- Directed by: Ian Munro
- Starring: Angie Milliken; Mark Owen-Taylor; Wendy Strehlow
- Music by: Nigel Westlake
- Country of origin: Australia
- Original language: English

Production
- Producer: Pamela Williams
- Cinematography: Steve Windon
- Running time: 90 minutes
- Production companies: Film Australia; Channel 4

Original release
- Network: ABC
- Release: 8 May 1991

Act of Necessity is an Australian 1991 television film about a couple who believe their daughter's cancer is caused by chemicals. It was the fifth in a series of docu-dramas about social issues made by Film Australia. It had an improvised script and features actors working alongside actual people form government, law and medicine. It culminated in a trial before a real judge and the outcome was not known until the judge made his ruling.

The film looks at the potential dangers from chemicals used on cotton crops. The Australian Cotton Foundation and the Aerial Agricultural Association of Australia both tried to get it banned.

== Cast ==
- Angie Milliken as Louise Coleman
- Mark Owen-Taylor as Ben Coleman
- Wendy Strehlow as Cressa Buchanan
- Tim McKenzie as Brian Buchanan
- Lauren Hewett as Samantha Coleman
- Lillian Crombie as Yvonne
- Stephen Grives
- Kris Graves
- Scott McGregor

== Awards ==
- 1991 Australian Film Institute Awards
  - Best Juvenile Performer – Lauren Hewett – won
  - Best Performance by an Actress in a Leading Role – Angie Milliken – nominated
