= Mark Harelik =

American actor and playwright (born 1951)

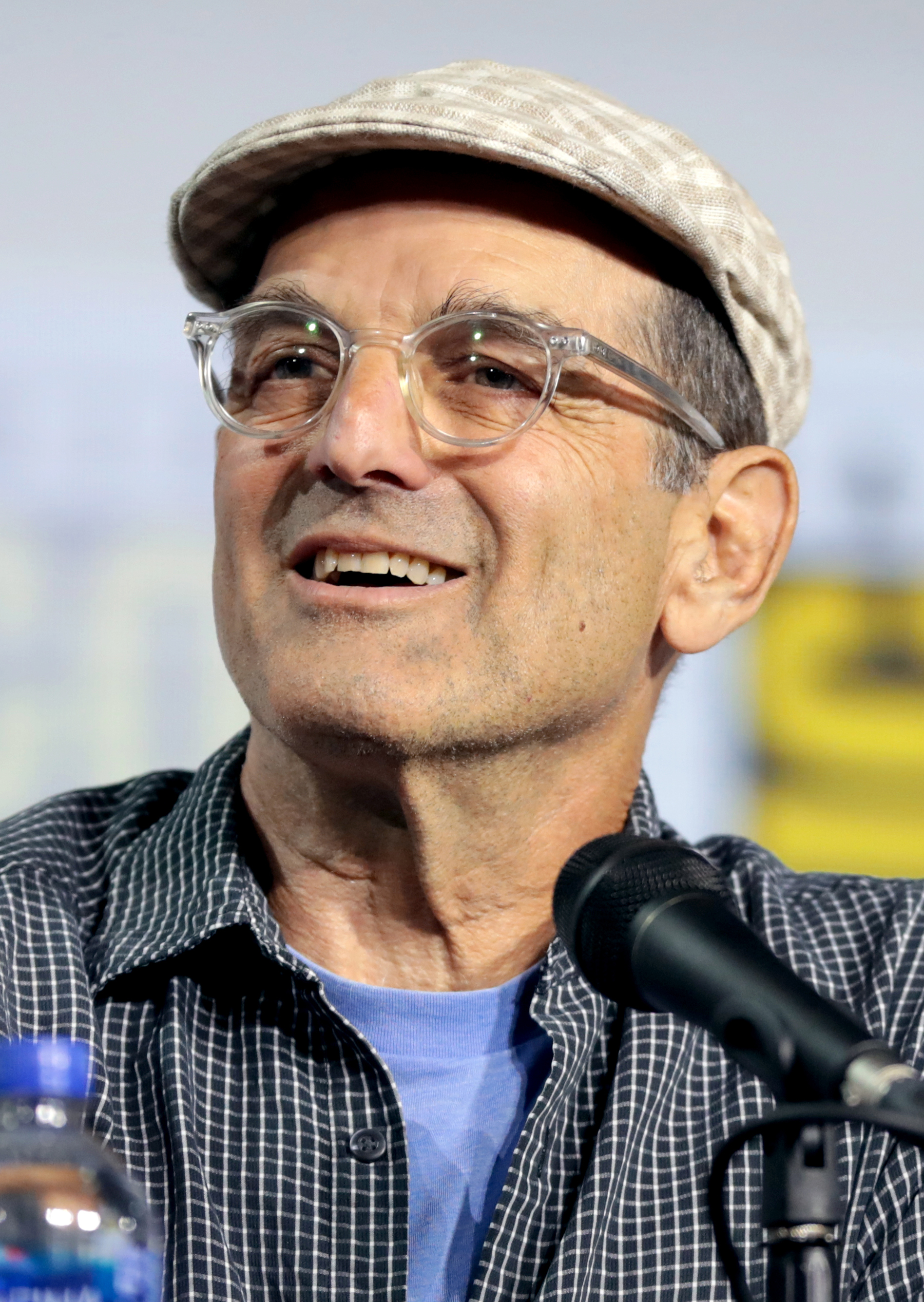
- Harelik in 2019
- Born: Marcus Frank Harelik; June 5, 1951 (age 75); Hamilton, Texas, U.S.
- Occupations: Actor; playwright
- Years active: 1983–present
- Spouse: Spencer Kayden (m. 2004)
- Children: 1

Marcus Frank Harelik (born June 5, 1951) is an American television, film, and stage actor, and playwright.

== Early life ==
Harelik was born in Hamilton, Texas.

In 1909, Harelik's Russian Jewish grandfather, Haskell Harelik—upon whom Harelik's 1985 play, The Immigrant, is based—immigrated to Galveston, Texas.

== Career ==
In 1987, he moved to Los Angeles where he co-wrote, with Randal Myler, Hank Williams: Lost Highway. In 1990, he worked in the Howard Korder play Search and Destroy and the William Ball play Cherry Orchard.

Harelik has appeared in the films Election, Jurassic Park III, Eulogy, For Your Consideration, and 42. For animation; he was the voice of Queen Uberta's valet, Lord Rogers, in The Swan Princess. Harelik has played parts on the television series Seinfeld, Numbers, Wings, Grace Under Fire, Will & Grace, NCIS, Grey's Anatomy, Boy Meets World, Breaking Bad, Bones, Six Feet Under and five episodes of the first season of The Big Bang Theory as Dr. Eric Gablehauser. He also played Sara Tancredi's lawyer in Prison Break. He appeared on the series finale of Cheers, in a 2002 episode of Joss Whedon's Angel as Count Kurushu, and "Counterpoint" an episode of Star Trek: Voyager. He also appeared in five episodes of short-lived NBC series Awake.

In 2015, he appeared under his own name as an actor hired by the Heavenly host to play God then later as God himself in the TV series Preacher.

Harelik appeared in the Broadway musical The Light in the Piazza. Harelik's play, The Immigrant, has been well-received, and was adapted into a musical of the same name.

In 1997, he released a sequel, The Legacy, changing it from a true story to fiction. He has appeared in several other plays including Temptation (1989), The Heidi Chronicles (1991), Elmer Gantry (1991), Tartuffe (1999), Old Money (2000), The Hollow Lands (2000), Be Aggressive, The Beard of Avon (2001), Cyrano de Bergerac (2004). Harelik also played Dr. Paul Stickley in HBO's series Getting On, an American adaptation of the British sitcom of the same name.

In 2015, Harelik co-starred as Jamie Thompson's father in This Isn't Funny, and in 2017, he played baseball player Hank Greenberg in the film Battle of the Sexes. In 2024, he was cast as Dr. Hiruluk from One Piece.

== Personal life ==
He is married to actress Spencer Kayden, who has acted in theatre productions alongside him. They have one child.

== Filmography ==
=== Film ===
Year	Title	Role	Notes
1990	A Gnome Named Gnorm	Detective Kaminsky	
1993	Barbarians at the Gate	Peter Atkins	
1994	The Swan Princess	Lord Rogers	Voice
1999	Election	Dave Novotny	
2001	Jurassic Park III	Ben Hildebrand	
2004	Eulogy	Burt	
2006	For Your Consideration	Round Table Host	
2007	Watching the Detectives	Detective Barloe	
2009	Timer	Dr. Serious	
2009	The Job	Martin	
2011	Meeting Spencer	David Thiel	
2013	42	Herb Pennock	
2015	This Isn't Funny	Joseph Thompson	
2015	Trumbo	Edward 'Ed' Muhl	
2017	Battle of the Sexes	Hank Greenberg	

=== Television ===
Year	Title	Role	Notes
1993	Wings	Davis Lynch	5 episodes
1993	Cheers	Reed Manchester	
1997	Seinfeld	Milos	
1998	Star Trek: Voyager	Inspector Kashyk	Episode: "Counterpoint"
1999	Boy Meets World	Jedediah Lawrence	3 episodes
2004	Will & Grace	Tim	3 episodes
2005	Gilmore Girls	Stuart Wultz	
2005	House	Mr. Foster	Episode: "Detox"
2006	Grey's Anatomy	Keith	1 episode
2006	Bones	Dr. Peter Ogden	1 episode
2006	ER	Husband of patient	1 episode
2007	Heroes	DHS Agent	Episode: "Out of Time"
2007–2008	The Big Bang Theory	Dr. Eric Gablehauser	5 episodes
2008	Medium	Publisher Elliot David	
2009	Monk	Mikhail Alvanov	Episode: "Mr. Monk and the Badge"
2010	Breaking Bad	Doctor	Episode: "Kafkaesque"
2012	Awake	Carl Kessel	6 episodes
2014	The Mentalist	Kenyon Russell	1 episode
2015	Unbreakable Kimmy Schmidt	Julian Voorhees	1 episode
2015	The Leftovers	Peter	1 episode
2016–2019	Preacher	Mark Harelik/God	
2017–2018	Imposters	Arthur Bloom	5 episodes
2017–2019	Snowfall	Arnold Tulfowitz	2 episodes
2018	Castle Rock	Gordon	3 episodes
2019	The Morning Show	Richard	2 episodes
2020	Perry Mason	Lyle	2 episodes
2022	The Rookie	William Bloomfield	Episode: "Backstabbers"
2024	Presumed Innocent	Liam Reynolds	2 episodes
2026	One Piece	Hiriluk	2 episodes

== Awards and nominations ==
- 2005 Drama Desk Award for Outstanding Book of a Musical — The Immigrant (nominee)
- 2003 Lucille Lortel Award for Outstanding Musical — Hank Williams: Lost Highway (nominee)
- 2011 Lunt-Fontanne Fellow at Ten Chimneys Foundation

== Publications ==
- The Immigrant
- The Legacy
