= This Isn't Funny =

2015 film by Paul Ashton

This Isn't Funny is a 2015 romantic comedy movie directed by Paul Ashton and written by Ashton and Katie Page. It was produced in the United States by Easy Open Productions, Metropolitan Entertainment, Not Bucket Films and Underman/Omega Girl Inc.

== Plot ==
Eliot Anderson, a stand-up comic, and Jamie Thompson, a juice store manager, meet and work out their relationship with each other. Each character also has family problems - especially with their parents. Eliot has a psychiatrist who has medicated her for over 12 years. She doesn't like taking the pills and skips her dose occasionally. Jamie's drugs are recreational, mostly alcohol and molly.

== Cast ==
- Katie Page as Elliot Anderson, a stand-up comic
- Paul Ashton as Jamie Thompson, a juice bar manager
- Edi Gathegi as Ryan, an artist and Jamie's roommate
- Anthony LaPaglia as Mike
- Mimi Rogers as Elaine Anderson, Elliot's mother
- David Pasquesi as Christoffer Anderson, Elliott's father
- Mark Harelik as Joseph Thompson, Jamie's father
- Angie Milliken as Barbara Thompson, Jamie's mother
- Gia Carides as Gillian Jones, famous comedian
- Beth Stelling as Hannah, a stand-up comic and Elliot's best friend
- Ahmed Bharoocha as Russ, a stand-up comic and bar manager
