= The Echo of Thunder =

1998 television film

- Based on: Thunderwith by Libby Hathorn
- Teleplay by: H. Haden Yelin
- Directed by: Simon Wincer
- Starring: Lauren Hewett; Jamey Sheridan; Judy Davis; Chelsea Yates; Emily Browning; Ben Hanson; James Hanson
- Music by: Laurence Rosenthal
- Country of origin: Australia
- Original language: English

Production
- Cinematography: David Eggby
- Editor: Terry Blythe
- Running time: 98 minutes

Original release
- Release: 19 April 1998 (U.S.)

The Echo of Thunder is an Australian family drama film, released for television in 1998. It is based on the novel Thunderwith by Australian children's author Libby Hathorn. It was aired on CBS in the United States as a Hallmark Hall of Fame presentation.

== Plot ==
The film is a story of a man, Larry Ritchie, who lives with his second wife and three kids on an Australian farm in the Wallingat Forest, NSW. He learns about the fatal illness of his first wife that leaves his eldest daughter, Lara, alone in the world. Larry decides to take the girl into his home, but his new family doesn't like the idea. The mother, Gladwyn, is possessive of Larry and their three children, Pearl, Opal and Jasper. Lara seeks solace with a mysterious dog she names Thunderwith that appears from time to time on the property. The dog seems to the girl to be a link to her beloved mother and an important companion. The story concentrates on the relationship between mother Gladwyn and stepdaughter, as Lara is slowly accepted into the family.

== Production ==
The film was shot in Mount Beauty, Victoria and directed by Simon Wincer. Hallmark Channel produced the movie, and the story undertook several changes; for example the four Ritchie children became only three on the set. Judy Davis, who played the mother, Gladwyn, was nominated for an Emmy for her performance. At the 20th Youth in Film Awards, the film was nominated for Best Performance in a TV Movie / Pilot / Made-for-Video: Young Ensemble and Best Family TV Movie / Pilot / Mini-Series.

== Cast ==
- Jamey Sheridan as Larry Ritchie
- Judy Davis as Gladwyn Ritchie
- Lauren Hewett as Lara Ritchie
- Chelsea Yates as Pearl Ritchie
- Emily Browning as Opal Ritchie
- Ben and James Hanson as Jasper Ritchie
- Michael Caton as Bill Gadrey
- Ernie Dingo as Neil
