= Spotswood (film) =

1991 Australian film by Mark Joffe

- Directed by: Mark Joffe
- Written by: Max Dann; Andrew Knight
- Produced by: Richard Brennan; Timothy White
- Starring: Anthony Hopkins; Ben Mendelsohn; Alwyn Kurts; Bruno Lawrence; Angela Punch McGregor; Russell Crowe
- Edited by: Offshoot Films
- Music by: Ricky Fataar
- Production companies: Australian Film Commission; Australian Film Finance Corporation; Film Victoria; Meridian Films; Smiley Productions
- Distributed by: Hoyts-Fox-Columbia TriStar Films
- Release dates: 20 November 1991 (London Film Festival); 23 January 1992 (Australia)
- Running time: 95 minutes
- Country: Australia
- Language: English
- Budget: A$3.4 million
- Box office: A$1,505,884 (Australia)

Spotswood (also known as The Efficiency Expert in the United States) is a 1991 Australian business comedy-drama film directed by Mark Joffe. The film stars Anthony Hopkins, with a supporting cast of Ben Mendelsohn, Alwyn Kurts, Bruno Lawrence, Angela Punch McGregor, Daniel Wyllie, Toni Collette (in her film debut) and Russell Crowe.

== Plot ==
In Melbourne, Errol Wallace is a financial business consultant whom we meet in the course of his being hired by the board of Durmack, an automotive component manufacturer, where he assesses a large work force redundancy and recommends major layoffs.

Balls, a moccasin factory located in the Melbourne suburb of Spotswood, is his next client. Mr. Ball, the owner of the company, is affable and treats his employees benevolently. Wallace on a factory tour finds the conditions wanting with shabbiness, old machinery and the workers lackadaisical.

A young worker at Balls, Carey, who is finding his place in the world and life, is asked by Wallace to assist in his review, compiling worker condition and performance information. Carey is reluctant until he learns that Mr. Ball's daughter Cheryl, whom he fancies, is part of the review staff.

Wallace learns that there is an instigator in the midst, his colleague Jerry, who leaks the Durmack report, inflating the quantity of sackings as a means to demoralise the union. Kim Barry, a salesman at Balls who also has his sights set on the boss's daughter, shows his ruthlessness and ulterior motives when he comes to Wallace's home one night with a complete set of the company financial records that detail non-existent profit for years and reveal that Ball has been selling off company assets to keep the outfit afloat.

Wallace realises that whatever productivity improvements have been implemented are not enough to save the company even with an elimination of workers and yet that is his recommendation. Mr. Ball responds, "It's not just about dollars and cents. It's about dignity, treating people with respect".

Wallace's mind set starts to change when his car is vandalised and some Ball workers come to his aid, workers who then start to include him in their off-hours activities. Mr. Ball announces the work force redundancies and Wallace is clearly uncomfortable seeing them, knowing that it was his recommendation that sealed their fate.

The union at Durmack capitulates and management celebrates with a party during which Wallace becomes further disenchanted by what he sees as the rash sackings. He then realises that Balls may have a competitive advantage that could potentially make the company profitable. If Balls stop trying to compete on price on a few products, but instead have a very large product range, then all the perceived inefficiencies (old machinery and a large number of highly skilled experienced workers), become opportunities for growth.

Carey realises he has feelings for his work mate and friend Wendy and together they climb up onto the roof of the factory and hold hands. In the final shot, they look out over the West Gate Bridge, which opened in 1978 - an ending which deliberately leaves it ambiguous as to when the film is actually set.

== Cast ==
- Anthony Hopkins as Errol Wallace
- Ben Mendelsohn as Carey
- Alwyn Kurts as Mr. Ball
- Bruno Lawrence as Robert, Carey's Father
- John Walton as Jerry Finn
- Rebecca Rigg as Cheryl Ball
- Toni Collette as Wendy Robinson
- Russell Crowe as Kim Barry
- Angela Punch McGregor as Caroline Wallace
- Daniel Wyllie as Frank Fletcher
- John Flaus as Gordon
- Gary Adams as Kevin
- Jeff Truman as Ron
- Toni Lamond as Mrs. Lorna Ball
- Jill Murray (credited as Jillian Murray) as Ophelia, Carey's Mum
- Lesley Baker as Gwen, Carey's aunt
- Russell James Fairweather as Opposition Driver "Jack" Don Small Goods

== Reception ==
On their movie review television program At the Movies, both Gene Siskel and Roger Ebert gave the film their "thumbs up" rating. Ebert said, "The Efficiency Expert is not only set in the 1960s, but it feels like it was made then, too. It's one of those oddball, good-hearted, little working-class comedies, like the British made thirty years ago—movies like I'm All Right Jack...It's a gentle movie with a lot of small, observant laughs in it, and I liked it".

Dennis King from the Tulsa World praised the movie, awarding it three and a half stars out of four. "Put The Efficiency Expert at the top of your agenda. It's a rare little bit of comic business, nestled in among the holiday blockbusters, that gives off a glow of good feelings and important truths," wrote King. He also praised the cast, writing, "The cast of Australian actors, largely unknown to American audiences, is wonderful. Mendelsohn, as the naive, bumbling Carey, is especially engaging".

Film reviewer Rob Lowing from the Sydney Morning Herald gave the film three stars out of four, describing it as "superbly produced and directed". Lowing wrote, "Like Proof and Death in Brunswick, this uses the right building blocks: a polished script with detailed characters and great casting that fits those characters like a glove".

Conversely, entertainment writer and critic Clifford Terry from the Chicago Tribune slammed the film as "strikingly unfunny", giving it only one and a half stars. He wrote, "The humor in Max Dann and Andrew Knight's screenplay is forced and flimsy — it may be so localized that it doesn't travel overseas — and you know you're in trouble when the most interesting scene in the whole movie is a slot-car race".

Spotswood was nominated for nine awards at the 1991 Australian Film Institute Awards, winning three: Best Achievement in Cinematography (Ellery Ryan); Best Achievement in Production Design (Chris Kennedy); and Best Achievement in Costume Design (Tess Schofield). The other nominations were for Best Feature Film; Best Performance by an Actor in a Leading Role (Ben Mendelsohn); Best Performance by an Actor in a Supporting Role (Alwyn Kurts); Best Performance by an Actress in a Supporting Role (Toni Collette); Best Screenplay (Max Dann and Andrew Knight) and Best Achievement in Editing (Nicholas Beauman).

== Box office ==
Spotswood grossed $1,505,884 at the box office in Australia, which is equivalent to $2,348,887 in 2009 dollars.

== See also ==
- Other People's Money
- Cinema of Australia
- Russell Crowe filmography
