= Tharini Mudaliar =

South African-born Australian actress, singer and violinist

Tharini Mudaliar is a South African born Australian actress, singer, and violinist of Tamil descent. She is best known for her role portraying the fictional character Kamala in The Matrix Revolutions. She is also recognised by fans of Xena: Warrior Princess where she played the role of Naiyima in the episode Between the Lines. She is a cousin of journalist, and television and radio presenter Indira Naidoo.

== Filmography ==
Film and television
Year	Title	Role	Notes
1997	Ocean Girl	Shersheba	Main role (series 4)
1999	Xena: Warrior Princess	Naiyima	"Between the Lines"
2003	The Matrix Revolutions	Kamala	
2004	Get Rich Quick	Tara	
2005	Blue Heelers	Dr. Amberkar	"The Walking Wounded", "One Good Turn'
2008	Bitter & Twisted	Young Doctor	
2009	False Witness	D.C. Megan Robinson	TV miniseries
