= Canto A La Vida =

1990 documentary film

Canto a la Vida
- Directed by: Lucia Salinas Briones
- Written by: Gina Roncoli
- Produced by: Gina Roncoli
- Cinematography: Erika Addis
- Edited by: Denise Haslem
- Release date: 1990
- Running time: 48 minutes
- Country: Australia
- Languages: English; Spanish

Canto a la Vida is a 1990 documentary film telling the stories of a number of Chilean women living in exile. It was directed by Lucia Salinas who was also living in exile. Subjects include Isabel Allende, Isabel Parra, Gracia Barrios and Tencha de Allende.

== Awards ==
- 1991 Australian Film Institute Awards
  - Best Documentary - Lucia Salinas Briones - won
