= Eight Ball (film) =

1992 Australian film

- Directed by: Ray Argall
- Written by: Ray Argall; Harry Kirchner
- Produced by: Timothy White
- Starring: Lucy Sheehan; Matthew Fargher; Paul Stevn; Frankie J. Holden; Angie Milliken
- Cinematography: Mandy Walker
- Production company: Meridian Films
- Release date: 1992
- Running time: 90 minutes
- Country: Australia
- Language: English
- Budget: $1.9 million

Eight Ball is a 1992 Australian film co-written and directed by Ray Argall.

== Plot ==
A young architect, Charlie, meets Russell, who has just got out of prison, when they are colleagues on Charlie's construction project: to build a giant Murray cod, as a tourist attraction for a small town in Victoria.

== Cast ==
- Lucy Sheehan as Jacqui
- Matthew Fargher as Charlie
- Paul Stevn as Russell
- Frankie J. Holden as Mal
- Angie Milliken as Julie

== Production ==
Eight Ball was directed by Ray Argall, and co-written by Argall and Harry Kirchner. Timothy White produced the film, while Bryce Menzies and Jill Robb were the executive producers.

Mandy Walker was responsible for cinematography, and Ken Sallows edited the film.

It was financed by the FFC and Film Victoria, and was shot from 13 May to 28 June 1991.

Argall later said that making the film was unsatisfactory:

I spent too much time and put too much energy into making everybody else happy and doing the right thing by everybody else instead of doing the right thing by myself. There's a point where you need to actually focus on what is there.

== Release ==
Eight Ball screened at the Sydney, Seattle, and Melbourne Film Festivals in 1992.
