= Marzena Godecki =

Australian actress (born 1978)

- Born: Marzena Godecki; 28 September 1978 (age 47); Bytom, Poland
- Other name: Marzena D'Odorico
- Spouse: Damian D'Odorico

Marzena Godecki (born 28 September 1978) is a Polish-Australian actress. She is best known for her starring role as Neri in Ocean Girl.

== Early life and education ==
Marzena Godecki was born on 28 September 1978 in Bytom, Poland. When she was three years old her family emigrated from Poland to Australia. She attended Methodist Ladies College in Melbourne.

Godecki was 16 and a modern dance and ballet student in Melbourne when she was selected from more than 500 girls who auditioned for the role of Neri in Ocean Girl.

In 1996, Godecki took a hiatus from the series, to complete her final year at secondary school concentrating on her favourite subjects—maths and science. She originally hoped after the last season of Ocean Girl to secure a place at university in Australia in veterinary science owing to her love of animals.

== Career ==
She was selected for the role of Neri in Ocean Girl for her graceful style of underwater swimming. When she first tried out for the part, Godecki recalls being taken to a local ocean pier in Melbourne and thrown into the cold waters to see if she was comfortable. She was, and after landing the lead role, Godecki was able to sharpen up her swimming skills and learn how to scuba dive at the Ocean Girl location, Port Douglas in Far North Queensland, Australia.

During the filming, Godecki was able to swim with dolphins and a pod of Minke whales that came up to the film crew's boat. Because much of Ocean Girl was filmed in the open water, she was always under the close watch of a stunt and dive safety team who kept a watch out for sharks.

Godecki was also a regular extra on the 1992 series of Round the Twist, appearing and sitting next to Linda in school scenes, but it was not a speaking part. She was credited as "Beautiful Girl". Although in the episode "Nails" she is called 'Madeleine' by Mr Snapper.

== Personal life ==
Godecki married in 2008 and is now called Marzena D'Odorico. She has a son named Nico, born in July 2007. She also has a daughter named Sasha, born in late 2011.

She ran the children's fashion store Tiny Threads in Melbourne, together with her business partner Melanie Tsoukas, from 2008 to 2012.
