= List of Ocean Girl episodes =

Ocean Girl (Ocean Odyssey in the UK) is an Australian science fiction television series aimed for family audiences and starring Marzena Godecki as Neri, the lead character. The show is set in the near future, and focuses on an unusual girl named Neri who lives alone on an island, and the friendships she develops with the inhabitants of an underwater research facility called ORCA (Oceanic Research Centre of Australia). It ran for four series, and was broadcast from 29 August 1994 to 22 December 1997.

== Series overview ==
Series overview
Series	Episodes	Originally released	
Series	Episodes	First released	Last released
1	13	29 August 1994	21 November 1994
2	13	3 July 1995	25 September 1995
3	26	3 August 1996	2 March 1997
4	26	17 November 1997	22 December 1997

== Episodes ==
=== Series 1 (1994) ===
No. overall	No. in series	Title	Directed by	Written by	Original release date
1	1	"The Girl in the Sea"	Mark DeFriest	Peter Hepworth	29 August 1994; 3 October 1994 (Disney Channel U.S.)
In order to continue her research on whales, Dr. Dianne Bates is assigned to ORCA. She arrives there to do the research with Dr. Winston Seth, but her two sons, Jason and Brett, have to go too and are miserable about the change in scenery. Jason especially does not want to be on ORCA and when he is given the job of tagging a whale, his mother feels he has sabotaged it on purpose.
2	2	"Set Adrift"	Mark DeFriest	Peter Hepworth	5 September 1994; 10 October 1994 (Disney Channel U.S.)
Vanessa Lane comes to ORCA and ends up in the same class as Jason. Brett, Zoe and Froggy play a trick on Vanessa and she gets back at Brett and leaves him in a broken boat out at sea. A storm comes up, so ORCA can't organize a search for Brett until the next morning. Brett becomes stranded on Neri's island where he meets her, and tells Jason about her when he comes back.
3	3	"Wall of Death"	Mark DeFriest	Neil Luxmoore	12 September 1994; 17 October 1994 (Disney Channel U.S.)
Jason gets his boat license and goes out to sea to sink a drift net. Charlie gets stuck in the net and Neri tries to save him, but gets stuck also. Brett chases a tree frog in the forest and falls into quicksand. He starts screaming for Jason and the sand sucks him deeper but he is rescued. When Jason realises what has happened, he works against time to free them both and Neri reveals a secret place to Jason.
4	4	"The Earthquake"	Mark DeFriest	Neil Luxmoore	19 September 1994; 24 October 1994 (Disney Channel U.S.)
Vanessa and Jason go out on a mission with the boat, but Neri warns Jason that an earthquake is coming, so they return. Commander Lucas gets angry with Jason, but the earthquake is for real and, when it strikes ORCA, Damien and Lee find themselves trapped in a quake-damaged room filling up with water. Froggy pulls a trick with the ORCA computer called H.E.L.E.N. to try to get them out.
5	5	"Human Tears"	Mark DeFriest	David Phillips	26 September 1994; 7 November 1994 (Disney Channel U.S.)
Brett's birthday party proves to be a big hit with his friends, but Brett is disappointed when he doesn't receive a gift from his father. Following a heated argument between Dianne and Commander Lucas over the acquisition of new equipment for Dianne's research, Winston suggests that they should make an effort to be nicer to one another. Talking with Froggy and Zoe about divorce and stepparents, Brett gets the idea that there may be a relationship at work between his mother and Commander Lucas, especially when he sees how nice they are being to each other of late. Brett's belief seems to be validated when he finds himself being given a private tour of the bridge by Commander Lucas, during which he decides to casually mentions some unsettling details about his mother hoping to disinterest the Commander.
6	6	"Property Developers!"	Mark DeFriest	Michael Joshua	3 October 1994; 14 November 1994 (Disney Channel U.S.)
A pair of property developers arrive at ORCA in the hopes of converting Neri's island into a resort. Jason joins them for an overnight trip to the island, where Jason and Neri secretly work together to scare the men into abandoning their plans.
7	7	"Toxic Waste"	Mark DeFriest	Alison Nisselle	10 October 1994; 21 November 1994 (Disney Channel U.S.)
Neri brings Jason's attention to a toxic dump in the ocean that is making Charlie sick, but ends up becoming ill herself. When Jason is reprimanded for leaving an important project, it is up to Lee, Brett, Froggy and Zoe to prove to Commander Lucas that the dumping of waste in the ocean is occurring. A barrel is recovered and dramatically revealed during a presentation on ORCA by Zenco, a major sponsor of ORCA research and the company responsible for dumping the waste. On the island afterwards, Jason administers the antidote for the poison to Neri and she quickly recovers.
8	8	"Day Pass"	Brendan Maher	Ian Coughlan	17 October 1994 (AUS); 28 November 1994 (Disney Channel U.S.)
Jason agrees to show Neri his and Brett's home on ORCA. After stealing one of Vanessa's uniforms and obtaining a fake ID from Froggy, Brett begins a long-winded tour of ORCA that he hopes will bore Neri into making her visit a short one. Neri, however, is quickly captivated by ORCA. Getting separated from Jason and Brett, Neri wanders into Dianne's lab where she encounters both Dianne and Commander Lucas. Meanwhile, Vanessa discovers that one of her uniforms is missing and has an idea of just who is wearing it. Jason and Brett are able to get Neri away from an insistent Vanessa and away from ORCA before any more trouble arises.
9	9	"Romance"	Brendan Maher	Shane Brennan	24 October 1994; 5 December 1994 (Disney Channel U.S.)
As the kids are preparing for their shore leave to Port Douglas, Neri makes a surprise visit that forces Jason and Brett to take her with them. Damien invites Neri to see a movie, but the experience frightens her and she runs off. On her own, Neri meets a young Aboriginal boy and helps him retrieve a bracelet given to him by his late mother which a gang of bullies have stolen. Returning to ORCA, Jason and Lee find themselves alone but Commander Lucas's arrival makes for an awkward moment. Neri asks Brett what kissing is like and when he suggests she try it, she does, with Damien. Dianne and Winston come to the conclusion that Charlie is actually communicating with the small animal that accompanies him, but Dianne is not happy by Jason's lack of interest in the success of her research.
10	10	"Major Breakthrough"	Brendan Maher	Jenny Sharp	31 October 1994; 12 December 1994 (Disney Channel U.S.)
New monitoring equipment allows Dianne and Winston to hear Neri's communications with Charlie but when the tag on Charlie stops working Dianne must go out and replace it. Using the songs of Charlie and Neri, Dianne and Winston are able to attract Charlie to their location. Dianne runs out of oxygen while diving, but is rescued by Neri who is forced to reveal herself to Dianne and Winston in the process. When Dianne's research is faced with being shut down, Neri replaces the lost transmitter on Charlie enabling her research to continue.
11	11	"Industrial Spy"	Brendan Maher	Neil Luxmoore	7 November 1994; 19 December 1994 (Disney Channel U.S.)
Dianne asks Neri to help with her research on whales, Dianne is especially curious as to how Neri is able to communicate with Charlie. Arrangements are made for Neri to stay on ORCA, but as Dianne's work with Neri continues, Jason accuses his mother of "monstering" Neri when all Neri wants is to be a part of their family. Brett, Froggy, and Zoe chase after the spy who has been stealing Dianne's whale recordings.
12	12	"Neri's Secret"	Brendan Maher	Peter Hepworth	14 November 1994; 26 December 1994 (Disney Channel U.S.)
The spy takes the stolen whale recordings back to Dr. Hellegren at UBRI. Dianne's tests on Neri reveal a remarkable telepathic ability. Dr. Hellegren uses the stolen recordings to lure Charlie into an isolated bay bounded by an electrified net. Dianne readies Neri for her first dance but upon hearing Charlie's calls for help, Neri rushes out midway through. Curious as to why someone would steal recordings of whales, Commander Lucas decides to look into Dianne's research and discovers all about Neri.
13	13	"Tough Decision"	Brendan Maher	Neil Luxmoore	21 November 1994; 2 January 1995 (Disney Channel U.S.)
Jason and Brett round up their friends to help rescue Charlie, but Jason must also tell them the truth about Neri. Dianne deletes all of her computer research records on Neri after Commander Lucas tells her that he will have to file a report on Neri. The kids infiltrate the UBRI command post and are able to release the net and free Charlie. A blood test indicates that Neri is not human. Lee convinces Commander Lucas not to file his report. Leaving with Charlie on his annual migration, Neri tells her friends to watch for her return.

=== Series 2 (1995) ===
No. overall	No. in series	Title	Directed by	Written by	Original release date
14	1	"The Return"	Judith John-Story	Peter Hepworth	1995; 10 April 1995 (The Disney Channel U.S.)
Jason and Brett eagerly await the return of Neri and Charlie, as does UBRI's Dr. Hellegren who wants to study just one of the returning humpback whales, Charlie. Jason and Brett go to Neri's island to prepare for her return and find a silver pendant inside an unusual flower. When Dr. Hellegren's helicopter crashes into the ocean, Charlie calls to Neri who goes to help him but ends up being taken captive. Neri manages to escape, with a little help from Charlie, but she does so only moments before Hellegren is rescued by Captain Sam Phillips, one of the new arrivals on ORCA. Dianne's research contract is extended another six months by ORCA's new Commander, Kate Byrne; her son Mick, however, soon proves to be a challenge for the others.
15	2	"Where No Whale Swims"	Judith John-Story	Peter Hepworth	1995; 17 April 1995 (Disney Channel U.S.)
Neri makes her first visit to ORCA since her return, and tells her friends that she wants to discover who her people were. Jason, Brett and Neri go to her island to look for clues to her identity. Brett gives Neri the pendant he found in the flower and Neri tells him it was her father's and is a map of the island. Following clues found on the island, a large object is discovered under the island–from what they have learned so far, Jason suspects it to be a spacecraft. Mick locks Rocky in the recompression chamber as a joke, but Rocky's friends discover him in the nick of time after Rocky accidentally activates the chamber's controls.
16	3	"Father's Message"	Judith John-Story	Neil Luxmoore	1995; 24 April 1995 (Disney Channel U.S.)
The gang begin to dig for Neri's spaceship on the beach on part of the island Neri has never visited. The gang seem to be finding a huge spaceship and Neri brings Jason to the entrance of the ship deep under water. Together they enter the ship finding the inside dry and objects that they take with them when they leave. Froggy runs some tests on the object and it seems it's not from Earth. Meanwhile, on board the ORCA base, Kim and Mick have a competition to see who's the faster runner. Mick attempts to cheat by using the lift, but finds himself caught out by Vanessa.
17	4	"Records and Recollections"	Judith John-Story	Neil Luxmoore	1995; 1 May 1995 (Disney Channel U.S.)
The search for Neri's sister Mera is underway. Mick asks Froggy to use his computer to change his grades but Froggy won't do it. Commander Byrne isn't pleased with her son's grades, but Mick once again charms his way out of trouble. Rocky fixes up an old boat so Jason can leave ORCA as he pleases. Helping Winston with a survey, Joanne falls overboard. She is rescued by Neri, but to keep her a secret, Joanne is led to believe that it was Winston who saved her. Dianne and Winston discover that Neri's presence enhances their scans of the sea floor. Dr. Hellegren discovers Neri is the creature that accompanies Charlie. An old newspaper article leads Jason and the others to Johnny Mack, the man who found Mera.
18	5	"Mera"	Judith John-Story	David Phillips	1995; 8 May 1995 (Disney Channel U.S.)
The kids locate Mera. Her adopted name is Jane Seaforth, and after being bounced from foster family to foster family, she is now living at an institute for gifted children. Dr. Hellegren has also found Mera and wants to take her to UBRI where he can study her. Dianne and Winston ask Neri to help with their survey while the others go ashore to find Mera. At the institute, Jason and Vanessa talk to Mera and she promises to go with them if they prove she can trust them.
19	6	"The Institute"	Judith John-Story	Judith Colquhoun	1995; 15 May 1995 (Disney Channel U.S.)
Jason, Brett, Froggy, and Zoe return to the institute to get Mera, but Dr. Hellegren arrives there as well wanting to take Mera back to UBRI with him. Fortunately the kids arrive in time to rescue her, convincing her she can trust them by showing her Neri's silver pendant, to which Mera has the matching piece. While the others are off rescuing Mera, Neri helps Dianne and Winston with the survey. Mick asks Vanessa to the dance as a joke but she finds out. Neri is reunited with Mera.
20	7	"No Place Like Home"	Mark DeFriest	Kate Henderson	1995; 22 May 1995 (Disney Channel U.S.)
Mera is having a difficult time adjusting to living on the island and Neri leaves her alone while she goes to help with the survey again. Mick gets Froggy to use H.E.L.E.N. to spy on Vanessa's counseling session. The kids on ORCA throw a surprise birthday party for Vanessa, but Mick's practical joke results in a dangerous chemical spill and fire. Jason and Brett lead a successful rescue through the air ducts. In the aftermath, it is revealed that Mick has a reading disability. Commander Byrne assigns Mick to Dianne's survey crew. Jason is not happy about his mother's developing relationship with Sam. Dr. Hellegren connects Mera's escape to ORCA.
21	8	"Our Island"	Mark DeFriest	Helen McWhirter	1995; 29 May 1995 (Disney Channel U.S.)
Suspecting a connection between Neri and Jane Seaforth, Dr. Hellegren sends UBRI agents Forsyth and Liselle to ORCA to learn as much as they can about the two girls. Mick is assigned to Dianne's mission to map the ocean floor and an effort must be made to keep him from finding out about Neri, who is still assisting Dianne. Mera dislikes living on Neri's island, but after Neri shows her around she begins to like the place. Sam volunteers to process the survey results for Dianne and in doing so locates a large and valuable titanium deposit.
22	9	"Underwater and Undercover"	Mark DeFriest	Lois Booton	1995; 5 June 1995 (Disney Channel U.S.)
Neri returns to help Dianne with her oceanographic survey, leaving Mera alone on the island to face a UBRI search party that has come to the island looking for them. Mick catches a glimpse of Neri and Mera on a monitor, but everyone tries to make him think that he is just seeing things. He persists in his claim of having seen two girls but only Liselle, who is working as an UBRI spy, takes any interest. His story eventually gets back to UBRI where Dr. Hellegren plans to step up his search for the girls. When Dianne learns that Sam has been keeping his discovery of the titanium deposit a secret with hopes of cashing in on the discovery, Dianne asks him not to pursue it.
23	10	"Secrets Out"	Mark DeFriest	Neil Luxmoore	1995; 12 June 1995 (Disney Channel U.S.)
Prior to leaving on the final survey mission, Dianne learns Commander Byrne has assigned Froggy, Zoey, Joanne, Rocky and Kimberly to her crew. Forsyth hides a transmitter on the boat to allow UBRI to follow it. UBRI divers are dispatched to apprehend Neri and Mera and, in their struggle with the UBRI divers, Neri and Mera are caught by the boat's cameras for all to see, revealing their existence to everybody on board. Responding to Mera's call for help, Charlie intervenes allowing the girls to escape, it's the first time Mera has been able to talk to Charlie. After being told about Neri and her sister, the kids all agree to keep the secret, except for Mick who simply says that he'll think about it.
24	11	"Sabotage"	Mark DeFriest	Peter Hepworth	1995; 19 June 1995 (Disney Channel U.S.)
Jason takes Neri and Mera swimming off the ORCA platform. Mick finds out and heads out on a jet ski, he falls off and must be rescued by the girls. Neri helps Mick with his reading, during which it is revealed that Neri herself cannot read; he in turn joins the others in keeping Neri and Mera a secret. Forsythe tries to get access to Dianne's research and cripples H.E.L.E.N. in the process; in the confusion, Lyselle sees Mera in the corridor and reports back to Dr. Hellegren that Neri and Mera are on ORCA. Winston, receiving strange signals from Neri's island, goes to investigate and meets two strangers, but back on ORCA he says his trip was uneventful.
25	12	"The Arrival"	Mark DeFriest	Peter Hepworth	1995; 26 June 1995 (Disney Channel U.S.)
Neri leaves ORCA intending to save Mera and Charlie by giving herself up to UBRI. Brett chases after her, gets into an accident with a UBRI boat and is saved by Neri. Sam destroys his remaining records of the titanium deposit. Winston continues to secretly meet with the two strangers. Unable to bring the girls back to the island, Winston takes the two strangers to ORCA where they tell Neri and Mera that they have come to take them back to the Ocean Planet, their home. Vanessa helps Mick with his reading and defends him when Commander Byrne accuses him of slacking off. As a result, while it is clear that they become friends, it is also implied that there's a little bit more to their friendship than meets the eye.
26	13	"Return"	Mark DeFriest	Peter Hepworth	1995; 3 July 1995 (Disney Channel U.S.)
Neri and Mera make the decision to return to the Ocean Planet and convince Diane that her research must continue. Froggy fixes H.E.L.E.N., with a little help from Damien. Commander Byrne has Forsythe arrested when H.E.L.E.N. identifies him as the saboteur. The kids take care of Liselle, keeping her from contacting UBRI. Neri and Mera are taken back to the island, with Winston, Mick and Zoey acting as decoys to keep UBRI away. Final goodbyes are said as the girls board the spacecraft for home but after the ship leaves, one person has stayed behind: Neri, who says she must stay to finish her father's work.

=== Series 3 (1996–97) ===
No. overall	No. in series	Title	Directed by	Written by	Original release date
27	1	"Danger in the Reef"	Mark DeFriest	Peter Hepworth	3 August 1996
Winston calls Dianne and her sons back from their vacation informing them that UBRI has won the contract to construct ORCA City and their plans threaten a nearby fish breeding ground. Dianne, as ORCA's new environmental officer, quickly calls a stop to the construction and begins an environmental study of the site. A dive to collect samples sees Jason become trapped under a fallen strut. As a rescue party is assembled, Charlie calls Neri who comes to save Jason as his air is about to run out. Dianne takes her case against UBRI before a tribunal who rule in her favour, stopping UBRI's construction. Dr. Hellegren's plans to destroy the breeding ground are thwarted by Neri. Hellegren warns Jason and Brett not to interfere with him.
28	2	"Amnesia"	Mark DeFriest	Peter Hepworth	10 August 1996
Brett talks Jason and Neri into looking for a way into the spacecraft they found buried on Neri's island, but their search is unsuccessful. Brett and Benny meet Cassandra, a new arrival from ORCA's sister station near Florida. Cass takes out a sailboat, but with a storm coming and a damaged sail, she seeks shelter on Neri's island. The following day, Neri finds an entrance to the spaceship that was uncovered by the storm. When Jason and Brett come to the island, Cass sees them with Neri before fixing the sail on her boat and heading back to ORCA. Distracted by the sight of Neri in the water ahead of her, Cass is struck by the boat's boom and is knocked unconscious. Back on ORCA an anxious Jason and Brett discover Cass has amnesia and cannot remember what happened to her. Jason tells Brett to become friends with Cass to keep her from telling about Neri if she gets her memory back. Dr. Hellegren goes to visit his daughter Lena at her boarding school, and she pleads with him to be allowed to spend her vacation at home.
29	3	"Draining the Spaceship"	Mark DeFriest	Neil Luxmoore	17 August 1996
Jason and Brett steal a pump from UBRI supplies on ORCA so they can pump out the spaceship. Cass and Brett trade practical jokes but when they team up to get Cass's sister Morgan, they also catch the Commander in their soapy trap. Jason is teamed up with Sallyanne for a training exercise, but their first drill does not go well. With the spacecraft pumped out, Neri and Jason enter the ship. They are joined by Brett, who has been scrubbing the floors on ORCA for his role in the practical joke on Morgan, and the trio come across a person in a sealed chamber, still alive.
30	4	"Kal Who Knows No Fear"	Mark DeFriest	Michael Joshua	24 August 1996
Jason and Brett are about to force the chamber open when Neri finds the controls that open the chamber and revive its occupant. He comes to and says his name is Kal. He is shown around the island where he seems to be content to live. Brett and Jason are surprised when Kal says he will take a subordinate role in relation to Neri, as is done on his own planet. Benny covers for a girl caught cheating on an exam and is also disqualified. Lena Hellegren makes a surprise appearance at UBRI, forcing her father to take her home where she convinces him to let her remain instead of being shipped off on vacation by herself.
31	5	"Diving Around Obstacles"	Mark DeFriest	David Phillips	31 August 1996
Concerned about Kal's development, Neri asks Jason to talk to him. After telling him to stay on the island, Kal follows Neri to ORCA. Brett, Benny and Cass are given diving lessons for their failed practical joke on Morgan. After their lesson, Benny sees Kal aboard the boat starting the motor and then diving overboard, he tries to tell people what he saw be no one will believe him and instead accuse him of starting the boat. Dr. Hellegren brings Lena to ORCA where Jason and Brett tell her about some of the things her father has done but she won't believe them.
32	6	"Winston and Water"	Mark DeFriest	David Phillips	7 September 1996
Hoping to keep Kal from making any return trips to ORCA, Jason suggests to Neri that she show him around the spaceship which he has been interested in. Winston's inability to swim is made an issue of by Kellar and UBRI, threatening his job on ORCA as they hope to replace him with one of their own. Benny discovers a provision is the regulations forcing the Commander to give Winston a week to meet the qualifications. Neri brings Jason and Brett back to the ship where she and Kal have made a discovery. An interface with the ship's computer gives Neri access the ship's log written by Kal's mother. She explains to the group about a mission requiring the assembly of nine pieces of "Synchronium" which once put together will have the power to heal the Earth's oceans. Neri asks Jason and Brett to help her look for the Synchronium but they must not tell anyone else. Believing that Neri is close by to assist him, Winston passes his swimming test.
33	7	"A Super-Sportsman"	Mark DeFriest	Judith Colquhoun	14 September 1996
Neri goes to ORCA to see how Jason and Brett are going with their search for the Synchronium. Dianne takes the opportunity to ask her to help Winston with his dive test which she agrees to do. When Neri doesn't return to the island on time, Kal takes the opportunity to go back to ORCA. On ORCA, Kal manages to get signed up for Morgan's fitness class (she's very impressed with him) and gets a date with Marika, which Jason is able to speed him through. Neri helps Winston through his test by getting him to believe in himself. After Lena's visit to ORCA, Kellar warns her that her curiosity may reveal things about her father she might not want to know.
34	8	"Extraterrestrial Abilities"	Colin Budds	Judith Colquhoun	21 September 1996
Neri awakes on the island to find Kal missing, he's gone to ORCA. Jason and Brett introduce Kal to Diane and Winston. Shortly after, Neri arrives and tells Diane about UBRI's plans to use explosives on the ocean floor in their construction. Diane is not happy and takes the issue before the tribunal but unfortunately they rule in favour of UBRI and allow the blasting to proceed. Jason and Brett begin searching HELEN for reports of UFOs and meteorite impacts that may help them locate the Synchronium pieces. Neri senses something wrong with the oceans but cannot be more specific. Successful in their search, Jason, Brett, and Neri venture inland to retrieve the first piece of Synchronium. Lena accesses her father's locked computer files. Kal beats Benny, the youth champion, in a game of trigammono.
35	9	"The Capsule in the Desert"	Colin Budds	Alison Nisselle	3 November 1996
Brett locates another piece of Synchronium but interrupts Jason's training exercise to tell him the news. UBRI has also located the piece and mount an effort to retrieve it. Lena is back on ORCA looking for clarification about her father, she learns nothing from Brett but does meet Kal. Jason, Brett, and Neri go after the second piece of Synchronium, it is far inland and they must go by camel. Arriving after UBRI, who have already recovered the Synchronium, the trio is spotted and pursued by Kellar who they are able to elude on their sure-footed camels. Dr. Hellegren begins studying the piece of Synchronium and discovers that it generates a tidal force.
36	10	"Benny in Trouble"	Colin Budds	Carole Wilkinson	10 November 1996
Neri moves the Synchronium piece to her secret underwater cave to keep it safe. Benny's father chastises him for spending time with Brett and Cass instead of studying. Cass finds a young boy on ORCA who swam to ORCA from the ship that was taking him and his family home after they were refused refugee status, she keeps him a secret and brings him food. Brett and Benny go in search of sunken treasure but when a valuable piece of equipment falls overboard, Benny goes after it and runs out of oxygen. Charlie calls Neri to rescue him revealing to him her presence. Benny lies to the commander about the incident to keep Neri a secret. Cass' stowaway is discovered and he is turned over to immigration officials. Lena gains access to her father's files about Neri.
37	11	"Cassandra's Nightmare"	Colin Budds	Jenny Sharp	17 November 1996
A trip to ORCA prompts a discussion between Neri and Kal about feelings. Cass is beginning to remember about her time on Neri's island in her dreams. Brett takes Benny to the island to see Neri and Kal and Jason arrives soon after having discovered the location of another piece of Synchronium deep in the ocean. Neri is anxious to retrieve it and sets out by herself. The boat taking Brett and Benny back to ORCA breaks down, and with strict instructions not to go to ORCA, Kal abandons them in the middle of nowhere. Charlie alerts Neri, who was unsuccessful in her attempt at retrieving the Synchronium, and she comes to their rescue. Back on ORCA Brett is hassled by Moose, a bully who demands his new satellite navigation unit. With Jason and Brett assisting her, Neri retrieves the Synchronium from the ocean depths just moments before UBRI arrives on the scene. Brett is again confronted by Moose but Kal, acting on the lesson he received on loyalty after abandoning Brett and Benny, defends Brett against Moose and his cohorts.
38	12	"The Helicopter Exam"	Colin Budds	Neil Luxmoore	24 November 1996
Neri continues to teach Kal about feelings. Cass is still having her dreams about her time on Neri's island and now remembers Brett being there. Lena overhears her father and Kellar talking about their plans for creating a news bulletin to lure some of the kids from ORCA to an island to find out exactly what they know about the alien device. Jason is uneasy about his helicopter flight test and is unable take the controls. Kal searches the spaceship for a gift left to him by his parents. Benny and Brett arrive and find him playing a strange musical instrument and crying, Brett explains to Kal why people cry. Seeing the news bulletin created by UBRI, Brett and Neri head off to the remote island looking what they believe to be another piece of the Synchronium. Lena arrives on ORCA to warn the Bates brothers about the trap but she is too late to stop Brett, she does find Jason and warn him. Needing to get to Brett and Neri quickly, Jason goes on another helicopter test with Morgan and diverts to the island to warn Brett and Neri. Upset by his failed plan, Dr. Hellegren suspects a leak in the UBRI chain of command but it is Kellar who learns who tipped off their plan.
39	13	"Lena's Betrayal"	Colin Budds	David Phillips	1 December 1996
Neri receives a message from Mera in a dream warning her that time is running out. Neri goes to ORCA where she warns Dianne that UBRI's development must be stopped. Kellar tells Hellegren of her suspicions about Lena, but he won't listen to her and tells her not to question his daughter. Jason is forced to tell Lena all about Neri and their search for the Synchronium. Dr. Hellegren orders the construction of ORCA City to be sped up by increasing the yield of the explosives. Cass is sent to a psychiatrist to help her understand her dreams, what she remembers however is quickly reported back to Dr. Hellegren who observes her next session. Cass returns to ORCA with a restored memory and demands to know the truth. She is taken to meet Neri and promises to keep her a secret and aid in the search for the Synchronium. With evidence of his daughters actions, Dr. Hellegren confronts Lena, she admits what she's been doing and leaves home after he says she is no longer his daughter. Kal experiences fear when Neri is threatened by a large underwater explosion. Winston believes the continuous explosions may threaten the stability of a nearby fault line and cause earthquakes.
40	14	"Changes"	Mark DeFriest	Lois Booton	12 December 1996
H.E.L.E.N. is not being cooperative in the kids' search for more pieces of the Synchronium. Meanwhile, UBRI has located another piece. With nowhere to go after leaving home, Jason and Brett convince their mother into letting Lena stay with them on ORCA. Lena is taken to meet Neri and Kal on their island and after returning to ORCA, she is able to find the location of another piece of Synchronium from H.E.L.E.N. When they arrive at the location pinpointed by Kal, they discover that once again, UBRI has beaten them to it. Plans are quickly made to get the two pieces that UBRI has in their possession. Neri wants to go on the raid of UBRI headquarters and Jason, concerned for her safety, begrudgingly agrees to let her come along but then leaves with the others a day early to keep her from coming. Neri comes to ORCA the next day to see how the plans are going and discovers that she's been lied to and she angrily goes back to her island to wait. Entering the UBRI complex, the two pieces of Synchronium are recovered but one is lost trying to escape UBRI security on the way out. Winston finds evidence of a possible fault line but the commander is not convinced. When Neri expresses her concern for Jason, Kal's jealousy of their relationship begins to surface.
41	15	"The Spy"	Mark DeFriest	Judith Colquhoun	15 December 1996
Winston is excited about the arrival of Camilla Sabato to ORCA; she is a science writer, but more importantly a close friend. Winston gives her a tour of ORCA but afterward Brett catches her making a secret transmission to Dr. Hellegren telling him that she will be looking for information about his "Ocean Girl". Brett informs Dianne and Winston who see that Camilla leaves ORCA. Kal finishes at the top of his class in a fitness competition, he returns to the island to tell Neri but finds her once again preoccupied with Jason. Kal's jealousy surfaces again and after telling Jason that he is no longer welcome on the island, he moves back into the spaceship. Neri is concerned about the condition of a nearby coral reef, she and Jason go to film the site (Jason skips out on a party that Sallyanne asked him to) hoping to gather evidence to prove that ocean life is being destroyed by UBRI's construction of ORCA City. A large earthquake strikes, opening the fault line near ORCA.
42	16	"Gamma Level: Radioactive"	Mark DeFriest	Graham Hartley	22 December 1996
Dianne demands that a tribunal hearing be convened to stop UBRI's development, but Hellegren argues that there is no connection between the earthquake and UBRI's explosions. Another piece of the Synchronium is located by Lena, and Brett and Cass are sent to Neri's island to get Kal to pinpoint its location. Venturing inland to retrieve the piece, Neri, Brett and Cass encounter a farm family with a blind daughter (Petra Yared). After discovering the Synchronium capsule to be empty, the trio are surprised to find that the Synchronium piece is a prized possession of Patti. After spending time with Patti, she gives Neri the Synchronium piece. When Lena encounters her father on ORCA, she threatens to go public with his work if he makes life difficult for her on the station. Dianne is upset to discover that canisters of radioactive materials are being stored in the school section of ORCA. When a tremor strikes, the canisters break open threatening Benny who is in the otherwise deserted computer lab. Jason goes against regulations to get him out and afterward he is praised by Commander Wellington who also chastises Morgan for her "by-the-books" approach to the emergency.
43	17	"Charlie is Stranded"	Mark DeFriest	Alison Nisselle	29 December 1996
Brett tries unsuccessfully to get Kal to come out of the spaceship. Dianne is granted a tribunal hearing to voice her concerns about the effects UBRI's construction is having on the fault line. During the hearing a tremor hits causing panic on ORCA and causing Charlie to beach himself. Neri recruits her friends on ORCA to try to rescue him. Jason leaves his post to help out and Sallyanne must cover for him when the Commander asks her where he is. The tribunal allows UBRI to continue their construction, but without blasting. Kal comes to ORCA looking for Brett but ends up talking with Sallyanne since everyone else is helping with Charlie. Needing additional help to free Charlie, Jason recruits Winston who helps place a sling under Charlie so that he can be towed off the sandbar. Returning to the island, Kal asks Neri why he wasn't asked to help with Charlie, unhappy with her answer, he walks away. On a secluded sandbar, Kal is observed and photographed by UBRI.
44	18	"The Love Letter"	Mark DeFriest	Michael Joshua	5 January 1997
Kellar shows Dr. Hellegren the footage she took of Kal on the sandbar, he quickly recognizes who Kal is and wants to capture him. After another of Kal's outbursts at Jason, Neri tells him to change his attitude or leave the island, Kal chooses the latter. A causal remark by Dave Hartley to Dianne has Brett thinking he may be interested in her. Brett recruits Benny to write a love note hoping to get the pair together (for his own selfish reasons mind you). Jason inadvertently gives the note to Sallyanne who thinks Jason has finally taken notice of her. When he tells her of the mistake, Sallyanne is crushed. Brett tries to end the fiasco by throwing out the note but it is retrieved by Delores, a girl he's been hounded by all day. Kal is caught by Dr. Hellegren and taken back to UBRI headquarters where Hellegren begins the process of convincing Kal to trust him. Worried about what has become of Kal, Neri, Brett and Jason search the island for him.
45	19	"Jason and the Abyss"	Mark DeFriest	Maureen McCarthy	12 January 1997
Neri continues to look for Kal but Jason suggests Kal is just trying to teach them a lesson by staying away. Neri receives another warning from Mera. Lena locates another piece of the Synchronium but without Kal to pinpoint its location, she gets HELEN to calculated possible sites. Dr. Hellegren gets Kal talking about Neri, Jason and ORCA. Kellar leads a UBRI team to retrieve the Synchronium piece while Dr. Hellegren stays behind to talk with Kal. The kids locate the Synchronium at the bottom of a seaside cliff and Jason repels down to get it as UBRI, who have been observing the kids, closes in. The others must flee with Neri to ensure safety, forcing Jason to hand over the Synchronium to Kellar. Jason overhears Kellar saying that they have Kal. Dr. Hellegren gives Kal the choice to leave or to stay with him and work towards possessing the Synchronium themselves. Kal, captivated by the power he is being offered accepts Hellegrens proposal to work together.
46	20	"Eavesdropper"	Mark DeFriest	Helen McWhirter	19 January 1997
Kal is in the lap of luxury at UBRI, his room filled with all sorts of toys and games. Kellar, making reference to his failed relationship with Lena, angers Dr. Hellegren by suggesting he is treating Kal like an "obedient son." Hoping to find out where UBRI is keeping Kal, Cass and Brett take to the ORCA air ducts planning to break into UBRI's offices on OCRA. Discovered by UBRI security, they must quickly retreat at which time Brett loses his ID. UBRI identifies the intruders from Brett's ID and Dr. Hellegren seizes upon the opportunity to help him return Kal to his friends. About to release Kal, Dr. Hellegren tells him he is to discover where Neri keeps the pieces of Synchronium and report back to him, he also teaches Kal how to lie, and again promises Kal control of the island if he cooperates. Cass and Brett return to the air ducts in another attempt to find out where Kal is being kept. Kellar is prepared and makes sure the two can hear her as she describes in detail UBRI's plans to relocate Kal. Using this information, the kids are able to "rescue" Kal from the UBRI truck transporting him. Back on the island, Brett says he is glad things are "back to normal" but at the same time, Kal is swimming out to talk to Dr. Hellegren who is disguised as a fisherman nearby.
47	21	"Water in the Desert"	Colin Budds	Helen McWhirter	26 January 1997
Neri has Kal promise not to leave the island again. Lena uses H.E.L.E.N. to locate another piece of the Synchronium. Mera appears to Neri to again warns her that time is running out. The next day, Neri and Kal are on ORCA, but when asked to pinpoint the landing area of the Synchronium, Kal says he cannot. Kal tells Neri he is going back to the island to have a swim and think about a problem, but he instead goes to see Dr. Hellegren to tell him about the new piece. Hellegren isn't anxious to send UBRI forces after it, instead preferring to let the kids find it and then take all the pieces at once after Kal discovers where they are hidden. Lena does her best to pinpoint the location of the Synchronium, but must use more of H.E.L.E.N.'s resources to do so. Unfortunately an earthquake hits at that moment and the Commander quickly discovers the extra strain on H.E.L.E.N. when he is unable to access H.E.L.E.N. As punishment for their actions, Lena, Cass, Brett, and Benny are assigned to clean-up detail-with Morgan as their supervisor. Neri ventures into the outback on her own to recover the Synchronium but succumbs to the heat. She is found by an Aboriginal girl who takes her back to her family's campsite. There she is told a story about a water spirit who crashed to earth creating the water hole before them. Realizing what the story means, Neri dives to the bottom of the water hole and finds the piece of the Synchronium. Finished with their clean-up duty, Cass takes out her frustrations on Morgan. Neri, exhausted from her walk back to the shore and her swim to the island, and is met on the island by her friends. That night, as Neri sleeps, a spaceship lands on the island – Mera has returned to help her sister.
48	22	"The Safe Deposit Key"	Colin Budds	Lois Booton	2 February 1997
The cadets' exam results are in and after looking at hers, Sallyanne tells Jason he would be better off with another partner. Mera reveals to Neri and her friends that Charlie's song is the trigger that activates the Synchronium. Kal overhears this and quickly goes to tell Dr. Hellegren. Hellegren meanwhile has to contend with his financiers who are anxious for results. Mera is taken to ORCA and introduced to Benny, Cass and Lena. Neri and Mera talk Lena into stealing the key her father wears around his neck—it is the only way to gain access to the Synchronium that UBRI has. Outside the Hellegren home, Kal makes a surprise appearance wanting to help. After Lena gets them into the house and Neri is about to get the key, Kal intentionally knocks over a vase waking Hellegren. They are all able to escape but do not get the key. Disappointed about her scholastic performance so far, Sallyanne wants to quit but decides against it after saving Jason when a bulkhead is breached.
49	23	"The China Man"	Colin Budds	Neil Luxmoore	9 February 1997
A large quake hits keeping Lena from accessing HELEN to look for more of the Synchronium. Cass and Benny sneak into the UBRI offices on ORCA where they overhear Dr. Hellegren talking to a Mr. Lee about a trade for a piece of the Synchronium that Mr. Lee has. Wanting to get this new piece before Hellegren, Cass, Benny and Lena gain entry into Mr. Lee's office building to retrieve the Synchronium. Cass and Lena are caught by security, but Benny, unsure about whether or not to flee the building, goes back and rescues the girls from Mr. Lee's office. Jason and Brett are told about the Synchronium in Mr. Lee's possession and they make plans to steal it when Mr. Lee brings it to ORCA to give to Dr. Hellegren. Meanwhile, Brett goes back to the island to search through the ship one last time, he is joined by Mera and Kal. Separating himself from Mera and Brett, Kal sneaks off to follow Neri hoping to discover where she hides the Synchronium. Charlie warns Neri and Kal is discovered. Back on the island, Mera once again voices her disapproval of Kal's actions. Winston is honoured by having the newly discovered fault line named after him.
50	24	"The Stone Fish"	Colin Budds	Graham Hartley	16 February 1997
The growing frequency of the seismic tremors causes Commander Wellington to call for voluntary evacuations of ORCA personnel. Cass tells Morgan to "drop dead" when Morgan gets after Jason for wanting to skip a survey dive. Jason's dive with Morgan ends abruptly when Morgan is stung by a stonefish, requiring her to be rushed back to ORCA. Cass feels guilty for what she said to her sister earlier. Sallyanne tries to talk to Jason about how she feels about him but he dismisses her to join his friends who are preparing to intercept the Synchronium transfer from Mr. Lee to Dr. Hellegren. Brett stows away on the UBRI vessel and when they are out at sea, he disables the craft and steals the Synchronium piece. Brett jumps overboard where Neri and Mera are waiting just as the Coast Guard arrives to board the UBRI vessel—Benny faxed them to tell them about UBRI's involvement with Opal smuggling. Having lost another piece of the Synchronium, Dr. Hellegren tells Kal that his most important job now is to locate where the Neri is hiding the Synchronium.
51	25	"Time Bomb in the Jungle"	Colin Budds	Alison Nisselle	23 February 1997
The effects of the new "Winston Seth" fault line are being felt all around the Pacific Rim as evacuations on ORCA are taking place. Lena locates the final piece of the Synchronium. Mera grows more suspicious of Kal's frequent disappearances but Neri once again defends his behaviour. After Sallyanne confronts Jason, Lena tells him that he should tell Sallyanne about Neri as she is his only close friend who doesn't know. The kids venture inland to recover the Synchronium, UBRI is also searching in the area but it is Neri who recovers the final piece. Neri gives the Synchronium piece to Jason to take to the underwater cave. Kal observes the pair leaving and discovers the location of the cave. He quickly reports back to Dr. Hellegren who, after dismissing Kal's request to have his side of their bargain upheld, sets out to recover the Synchronium. As Kal is bringing the pieces to the surface for Hellegren, Charlie warns Neri about what is going on, but when she gets to the cave, the Synchronium is already gone. Jason tells Sallyanne the truth about Neri but she doesn't believe his incredible story about a girl from outer space. Neri tells Jason and Brett the consequences of the Synchronium being used by the wrong people.
52	26	"The Last Chance"	Colin Budds	Peter Hepworth	2 March 1997
A large earthquake prompts the commander to call for an evacuation of all ORCA personnel under the age of 18. Dr. Hellegren is putting the Synchronium together when Kal demands that he be made the ruler of Neri's island as he was promised, Hellegren again brushes off Kal and has him escorted back to his room. Anxious to get the Synchronium back from Dr. Hellegren, Neri goes to get Jason. He is out on a dive mission with Sallyanne, and when Neri surfaces Sallyanne is there to see her. Angry about the way he is being treated by Dr. Hellegren, Kal attempts to steal a piece of the Synchronium, he is quickly caught by UBRI guards and taken back to his room. Back on ORCA, Sallyanne is introduced to Neri and Mera and plans are made to recover the Synchronium. Getting away during the confusion surrounding the evacuation, the kids are able to make it to UBRI's pier on the mainland. However, they are soon spotted by Kellar and are left tied (Dr. Hellegren taking Lena with him) up as the UBRI vessel heads out to sea. Kal escapes from UBRI and arriving at the pier, he unties the others. As Dr. Hellegren prepares to activate the Synchronium, Neri and Mera surface and plead with him not to proceed, even offering themselves for his to study if he stops. With her father preparing to unleash the power of the activated Synchronium, Lena jumps into the now seething and churning ocean to force him to stop or risk killing her as well. As Hellegren hesitates unsure what to do, Kellar pushes him aside to lower the Synchronium into the ocean. Just before it impacts, Kal surfaces and grabs the Synchronium and with Neri and Mera take it back to the island as a dejected Dr. Hellegren must admit defeat. Back in the safety of the island, Neri and Mera activate the Synchronium reversing the damage done to the Earth's oceans. Neri and Mera make a final trip to ORCA where Dianne and Winston are told about the Synchronium. After saying their goodbyes, the girls return to the island where Kal and Mera board a spaceship which lifts off taking them back to the Ocean Planet.

=== Series 4 (1997) ===
No. overall	No. in series	Title	Directed by	Written by	Original release date
53	1	"Operation Sphinx"	Mark DeFriest	Michael Joshua	17 November 1997
Brett and Jason are out testing a new diving suit when Jason encounters a strange bright light while under water, the pair quickly leave and head off to see Neri. Back on ORCA, Winston is puzzled by a magnetic anomaly on his scans of the ocean floor, even more strange is that the anomaly is in the shape of a perfect square. Dianne announces that she is going to pursue the vacant position of ORCA Commander. Jason matches the location of Winston's magnetic anomaly to where he saw the strange lights, Neri is also intrigued by the region prompting a closer investigation of the region. Neri swims out to the sight with Jason and Winston following in the minifin, ORCA's new underwater submarine. What they find surprises everyone – a huge underwater pyramid. Meanwhile, at PRAXIS headquarters (Preventative Response And eXtraterritorial Intelligence Service), agents Jake Shelby and Elly Hauser are dispatched to Egypt where reports suggest signals from outer space are being received. In Egypt, Professor Malakat and his young assistant continue their search for the underwater entrance to the "Pyramid of Mystery".
54	2	"The Mysterious Pyramid"	Mark DeFriest	Everett DeRoche	18 November 1997
Dianne is at ORCA Pacific headquarters for her interview, where she is surprised to discover her ex-husband Paul in the role of interviewer and more surprised to learn the job is hers if she wants it. Neri, Jason, and Brett return to visit the pyramid. Neri finds a way in and the boys follow in the minifin. Exploring the pyramid's interior, Neri activates a holographic recording which relays a cryptic message about a quest. A doorway opens revealing a swirling vortex which pulls the trio in. They re-emerge in another pyramid, and upon exiting, discover that they are in Egypt! Agents Shelby and Hauser begin their search for the receivers of the alien transmissions while Malakat and Shersheba continue their own search.
55	3	"The Transport"	Mark DeFriest	Everett DeRoche	19 November 1997
Neri, Jason, and Brett wander into an archaeological dig and meet Professor Malakat and Shersheba. Finding the minifin abandoned, Winston tracks the signal from Brett's vid-phone to the Middle East, but discounts his findings as a phantom signal. Back in Egypt, Malakat begins to take an interest in the travellers he's taken in, he has Shersheba befriend Jason hoping to find out more about Neri. Jason is able to make a quick phone call to ORCA and tells Cass where they are. From an analysis of the material in Neri's clothes, Malakat determines that she is not from Earth and when Shelby and Hauser enter the camp, he directs the agents to the kids. The agents contact Dianne promising to send them back to Australia, then says that Neri will have to stay behind due to problems verifying her identity. Forced to make a quick escape, Jason commandeers a jeep and the trio drive off, joining a tour group headed back to the "Pyramid of Mystery."
56	4	"The Golden Ankh"	Mark DeFriest	Everett DeRoche	22 November 1997
From the DNA sample obtained from a strand of Neri's hair, PRAXIS identifies Neri as an alien and makes her capture their top priority. Wandering in the desert looking for the Pyramid of Mystery, Neri, Jason and Brett get a ride from two Bedouins who take them back to their camp. Worried they've been picked up for the reward, when Neri rescues a young girl from drowning in a well, the trio become welcome guests. They are told a story about a Bedouin man who was abducted by people who "live like fish." The next morning they are taken back to the well that holds the entrance to the Pyramid of Mystery, they are spotted by Malakat and Shersheba who, after summoning Shelby and Hauser, pursue them into the pyramid. Inside the pyramid, Neri locates a golden ankh and opens the water portal allowing her, Jason and Brett to escape. Emerging on the other side, they discover they've been transported to a cave in the outback.
57	5	"Stranded in the Desert"	Mark DeFriest	David Phillips	23 November 1997
Leaving the cave to find help, Jason is found by Jakamarra who drives him back to the others but won't take them with him citing a legend about a "whale woman" who was pursued after leaving the very same cave. Winston locates the group in the outback but PRAXIS, after intercepting Winston's transmissions to the region, head out to capture the trio. Hauser and Shelby meet up with Jakamarra who leads the agents astray long enough for Jason and Brett's father to arrive in a helicopter to rescue Neri and the boys. Before leaving, Neri gives Jakamarra the golden ankh for safekeeping.
58	6	"The Lie Detector"	Mark DeFriest	David Phillips	24 November 1997
With Jason and Brett back on ORCA, agents Shelby and Hauser arrive soon after looking for Neri. They lock down the base hoping to trap Neri inside, but Dianne orders an evacuation of the base in order to countermand the lock down order and with the base re-opened, Neri is able to escape. She returns to the underwater pyramid and after activating the hologram, learns that the image is that of Shalamon, her mother. Shelby subjects Jason and Brett to a lie detector test but Winston is able to use H.E.L.E.N. to allow the boys to safely deny knowledge of Neri. Jason, Brett and Neri are flown by the boys' father to a farm on the mainland for their safety, but unbeknownst to them, Shelby and Hauser, having bugged the helicopter, looks on.
59	7	"The Bug"	Mark DeFriest	Jenny Sharp	25 November 1997
PRAXIS closes in and apprehends the kids at the farm. Jason and Brett are returned to ORCA while Neri is transported, by boat, to Praxis headquarters. En route, Charlie jostles the boat allowing Neri to escape and jump overboard. Cass locates the bug Praxis used to follow Jason, Brett, and Neri to the farm – it was hidden in Jason's watch. Jason, Neri and Brett return to the underwater pyramid, placing the Praxis transmitter on Charlie as a decoy. Activating the holographic image of Shalamorn, her message informs Neri of a crisis on the Ocean planet and tells her that she is a princess destined to lead her people. Meanwhile, Malakat and Shersheba have arrived in Australia to begin their search for the underwater pyramid.
60	8	"A Wrong Friend"	Mark DeFriest	Linden Wilkinson	26 November 1997
Shersheba makes a surprise visit to ORCA and Dianne gives Jason the task of showing her around the station. Louis pesters Winston about the magnetic anomaly and threatens to tell his father, ORCA's second in command, until Cass brings up the matter of Louis' use excessive of his father's credit card. Shersheba asks Jason to give her a tour of the reef which he reluctantly agrees to do. While watching Shersheba dive, Jason jumps in after her when she appears to be drowning. Jason is unable to find Shersheba but she is pulled to safety by Neri who Charlie called away from the pyramid to help. Back in the boat, Malakat suddenly appears and Shersheba quickly recovers. A struggle ensues but Jason and Neri are able to push Malakat and Shersheba overboard. As Jason and Neri make their escape, Neri comes to the realization that Malakat and Shersheba are from the Planet of the Oceans. Back in their seaside residence, Malakat is able to discover the location of the underwater pyramid using information Shersheba acquired while at ORCA.
61	9	"The Hunt for the Golden Ankh"	Mark DeFriest	Annie Fox	27 November 1997
PRAXIS's return to ORCA prompts Cass and Brett to seek Winston's help to delete all of H.E.L.E.N's records of Neri. Louis observes them through the airduct and informs Shelby and Hauser of what is happening but by the time the agents react, all of the records have been erased. Neri and Jason dive to the underwater pyramid, Neri activates the Shalamorn hologram and the pair learn about a rebel faction on the Ocean Planet opposed to a peaceful migration to earth. Soon after Malakat and Shersheba arrive and tell Neri and Jason of their own plans, as part of the rebel group, to use the power of the pyramid to melt Earth's polar icecap to prepare the planet for their people's arrival. Malakat also tells Neri that he caused the spacecraft that she and her father were on to crash to Earth. Malakat demands the Golden Ankh be turned over to him, but Neri and Jason escape through the water gate. They emerge in the same cave in the outback that they were in before and find Jakamarra waiting for them.
62	10	"The History of the Whale Woman"	Mark DeFriest	Peter Kinloch	28 November 1997
Jakamarra takes Jason and Neri to where he has hidden the golden ankh. Malakat is able to determine the location of the cave in the outback and informs Praxis of Neri's whereabouts. Brett interrupts a meeting between Malakat and agents Shelby and Hauser with an anonymous phone call to inform them that Malakat and Shersheba are aliens themselves. Shelby and Hauser track Neri and Jason through the outback, and joined by Malakat and Shersheba, they find Jason, Neri and Jakamarra and close in. Agent Hauser pursues the kids up a cliff face but she slips at the top. Neri sees Hauser slip and goes back to rescue her allowing Agent Shelby to close in and apprehend her. Shersheba takes possession of the ankh but Jakamarra steps in to grab it and tosses it to Jason. Jason's father arrives by helicopter and Neri tells Jason to escape with the ankh. Reluctantly, Jason boards the helicopter and must watch as Neri is taken away by PRAXIS.
63	11	"Cheat"	Mark DeFriest	Peter Kinloch	1 December 1997
Neri is taken back to PRAXIS headquarters where she is interrogated. Neri's capture prompts Jason to put the ankh out of reach of Malakat and Shersheba, and he drops it into the deep ocean. Neri's deteriorating condition and the uncaring treatment of her by PRAXIS results in Hauser developing a sympathetic attitude towards Neri. By showing Jason footage of Neri from PRAXIS's own security cameras, Shersheba convinces Jason that she and Malakat have Neri and offers to return her in exchange for the ankh. Jason and Brett arrive at the transfer location but Shersheba, disguised as Neri, grabs the ankh and runs back to Malakat, at which time they discover the ankh to be a copy. Later, Shersheba sneaks back onto ORCA and, with help from Louis, is able to discover the location of the real ankh. She retrieves it and returns triumphantly to Malakat.
64	12	"Imprisoned in the Bunker"	Mark DeFriest	Barbara Bishop	2 December 1997
Malakat and Shersheba attempt to unleash the power of the pyramid by are told by Shalamorn that the ankh must be prepared first. Praxis resorts to using experimental procedure to keep a deteriorating Neri alive. Paul locates the plans to the PRAXIS bunker and a rescue plan is devised. Malakat discovers that the secret to charging the ankh lies in the outback cave. Using H.E.L.E.N., the PRAXIS facility is flooded, forcing an evacuation. In the ensuing confusion, agent Hauser helps Neri escape and turns her over to Jason and Brett who entered the bunker through the flooded aqueduct.
65	13	"Attempt at Revival"	Mark DeFriest	Barbara Bishop	3 December 1997
Neri is brought back to ORCA, but she cannot be revived. Malakat and Shersheba successfully charge the ankh. PRAXIS destroys all their records of Project Sphinx and agent Hauser hands in her resignation. Louis calls agent Shelby to tell him that Neri was brought back to ORCA, but with the project over Shelby dismisses him. Jason and Brett take Neri back to the underwater pyramid, Malakat and Shersheba arrive soon after to use the charged ankh. As Shersheba is about to place her hand on the sacred stone, Jason places Neri's hand there ahead of her. The pyramid comes to life and Neri is miraculously revived. In anger, Shersheba destroys the ankh, bringing about a large seismic event. Jason and Neri escape the pyramid and they watch as the pyramid slowly sinks into the ocean floor. Neri is taken back to ORCA for a reunion with Dianne and Winston.
66	14	"The Snake Bite"	Colin Budds	Colin Budds	4 December 1997
Jason and Winston climb the mountain on Neri's island to install surveillance equipment. Making their descent, Winston is bitten by a snake and falls the rest of the way down. Meanwhile back on ORCA, technicians are preparing to upgrade H.E.L.E.N. but when they shut her down improperly, the entire station loses power. Neri and Brett trek across the island for a rare flower that can counteract the snake venom while Cass leads the effort to get H.E.L.E.N. back online. On the distant Planet of the Oceans, a fast acting virus has ravaged the world's oceans and Malakat, as the leader of the rebel faction, plans an invasion of the Earth. On ORCA, a signal from deep space has been picked up by the receiver on Neri's island – it is Malakat scanning for any signs of the underwater pyramid.
67	15	"A Spirit Appears"	Colin Budds	Everett DeRoche	5 December 1997
Jason and Brett return with Neri to their father's farm for Jason's birthday, but soon after arriving Paul is called away on business. While at the farm, Neri has a series of encounters with a strange young girl named Emma. Neri helps her overcome her fears but afterwards, a story told by Paul Bates and a farm hand reveals the girl's true identity. Back on the Ocean Planet, Mera faces an angry crowd of people demanding answers to the problems facing their planet. The installation of the new H.E.L.E.N. 6000 computer is completed on ORCA.
68	16	"Helen Learns the Laughter"	Colin Budds	Jenny Sharp	8 December 1997
On the Ocean Planet, Mera is pursued by the rebels but is able to reach safety in the Pyramid of the Elders. A group of rebels arrives on Earth. They pursue Neri, but are driven off by Jason and Brett in the minifin. Shersheba leads an assault on the Pyramid of the Elders. Mera escapes to Earth with a new Golden Ankh moments before the elders trigger the destruction of the pyramid. As the Pyramid of the Elders is destroyed on the Ocean Planet, back on Earth, the underwater pyramid returns.
69	17	"Mera Escapes to Earth"	Colin Budds	Helen McWhirter	9 December 1997
Mera's spacecraft splashes down in the ocean and as she swims to the surface she is surrounded by commandos. Seeing the craft come down from the island, Brett, Neri and Jason rush out to rescue Mera. Once safely back on Neri's island, Mera tells of the spread of the red virus on the Ocean planet, the rebel's growing power, and their plans to invade the Earth after melting the polar ice caps. Malakat and Shersheba make arrangements to return to Earth while Neri hides the new ankh in the river near the Bates' farm. Winston picks up PRAXIS radar activity near ORCA. Agent Shelby has monitored Mera's craft as it arrived on Earth and after connecting it with previous activity in the area, he is able to get Project Phoenix reopened. Neri observes Shersheba returning to the pyramid with her commandos.
70	18	"The Race"	Colin Budds	Helen McWhirter	10 December 1997
Richter talks Elly Hauser into rejoining agent Shelby on newly a reopened Project Phoenix. Winston, Cass and Brett program H.E.L.E.N. to provide 'just the facts' if questioned about pyramids. Louis overhears them trio talking about pyramids and tells Shelby and Hauser what they're doing. After a little prodding by Shelby, Helen reveals the existence of the underwater pyramid to the PRAXIS agents. Shersheba leads a group of commandos in a search of the nearby islands for Neri and Mera, but they are unsuccessful until Brett is observed in a boat heading towards an island, Shersheba informs Malakat of this and plans a search of this island. After showing her around the station, Louis challenges Ilona in a race to the galley.
71	19	"The Attack"	Colin Budds	David Phillips	11 December 1997
Shelby requisitions the minifin to get a closer look at the underwater pyramid, Diane assigns a reluctant Jason as his pilot. Near the pyramid, they encounter a group of commandos and come under attack. The minifin loses power and heads to the ocean floor. Jason is able to jump start the minifin using the battery from Shelby's GPS receiver and brings them safely back to ORCA. Shersheba and her commandos search Neri's island, Neri and Mera hide in a cave but when Shersheba closes in, she and her commandos are frightened off by a group of birds. Ilona eavesdrops on Shelby's report to Richter and reports what she's heard back to Malakat. Hauser interrupts Ilona's transmission and begins to grows suspicious of Ilona. The president of the Global union gives PRAXIS the authority to take over ORCA to use as a base from which to attack the underwater pyramid.
72	20	"The Taking of Hostages"	Colin Budds	Linden Wilkinson	12 December 1997
PRAXIS begins moving their equipment onto ORCA, including several nuclear weapons. Jason and Brett travel to the underwater pyramid to propose a meeting with Malakat of Neri's behalf. Hauser opposes Shelby's heavy-handed approach to dealing with the aliens. Neri meets with Malakat on a deserted beach, during their talk, Malakat reveal that he was responsible for her mother's death. Meanwhile, Mera is captured by Shersheba and her commandos, she will only be released in exchange for the ankh. Richter arrives on ORCA and assumes command of the station. Neri is torn over the decision on whether or not to exchange the ankh for her sister, Jason won't help her telling her it is a decision only she can make.
73	21	"The Red Virus"	Colin Budds	Annie Fox	15 December 1997
Paul and Brett Bates are given an audience with the Global Union's Madam President to voice their opposition to PRAXIS's adversarial stand against the aliens, they are granted an immediate suspension of all attack preparations. Malakat tells Shersheba and Mera that he was responsible for the creation and release of the Red Virus on the Ocean Planet. Hauser walks in on one of Ilona's transitions to Malakat thereby discovering that she is a spy from the Ocean Planet herself. Hauser tells Cass and Winston about Ilona and asks for their help in 'understanding' the aliens. Neri brings the ankh back to the island. Mera locates a hidden passage in the pyramid which gives her access to a source of water. Shersheba rebukes Malakat for his arrogance and controlling behavior reminding him that she will be the one in power when the Earth is conquered, Malakat in response stops advising her on what actions to take. Feeling the need to do something, Shersheba takes a vial of the Red Virus and releases it into the ocean.
74	22	"Before the Countdown"	Colin Budds	Annie Fox	16 December 1997
As the red virus spreads through the ocean, Jason must restrain Neri from going to Charlie's aid. Through the secret passage from her cell, Mera gains access to the central core of the pyramid and uses its power to send a telepathic message to Neri. Richter, along with Paul and Brett Bates once again are before Madam President of the Global Union but this time, with the red virus unleashed, she grants PRAXIS the authority to attack the pyramid. Shersheba encounters Neri in the ocean, she demands that Neri hand over the ankh to ensure the safety of both Earth and the Ocean Planet. When Neri goes to ORCA, she is spotted by Louis who quickly informs agent Shelby, but H.E.L.E.N. soon erases all traces of Neri's arrival, affectively destroying Louis' credibility with Shelby. Jason goes to the underwater pyramid to deliver the terms under which Neri will hand over the ankh to Malakat.
75	23	"The Countdown"	Colin Budds	Peter Kinloch	17 December 1997
With an attack against the aliens pending, all non-essential personnel are being evacuated from ORCA. Louis informs agent Shelby that Hauser has kept Ilona of the evacuation list which leads to Praxis discovering that she and her mother are both aliens. Louis also manages to be taken off the list prompting Brett and Cass to stay behind as well. Believing Malakat and his commandos to have evacuated the pyramid as promised, Jason and Neri go to the pyramid but, along with Mera, they are soon captured when Malakat and his commandos reappear from within the pyramid. The impending launch of the nuclear torpedo aimed at the pyramid is detected causing all those within the pyramid to flee. Frantic efforts on ORCA to stop the launch succeed but H.E.L.E.N. admits responding not to Dianne but on orders from "a higher power." With the launch stopped Shersheba and Malakat return to the pyramid and use the golden ankh to activate it. Malakat's first order is to begin the melting of the polar ice caps. Charlie reappears.
76	24	"The Ice Melts"	Colin Budds	Peter Kinloch	18 December 1997
With the melting of the polar icecaps well under way, Malakat prepares for the invasion of Earth with seeming ambivalence towards the red virus. Shersheba challenges Malakat to create a cure for the virus immediately and using the power of the pyramid he does. Shersheba quickly releases it into the ocean but the red virus begins to mutate and soon grows stronger, surpassing even the pyramid's ability to stop it. Unaware of Malakat's efforts, Neri goes to the pyramid to plead for him to stop the virus. Malakat orders her to be killed but Shersheba intervenes saying that he cannot kill the chosen one—Neri escapes as they argue. As Neri, Mera and Jason walk along the beach pondering their next move, Neri wonders if perhaps Charlie may hold the answer.
77	25	"The Blood Test"	Colin Budds	Barbara Bishop	19 December 1997
As Praxis again prepares to launch their nuclear torpedo at the pyramid, commandos storm ORCA allowing Shersheba and Malakat to seize control of the station. Convinced Charlie holds the key to defeating the red virus, Jason and Neri obtain a blood sample from him for testing. Jason returns to ORCA to find Shersheba in command. Suspicious of him, Shersheba asks Ilona to find out what he's up to. With all ORCA personnel confined to their quarters, Cass and Brett sneak through the air ducts to the lab so that they may test Charlie's blood for antibodies to the virus. Ilona overhears their plans and tells Shersheba who burst into the lab and seizes the cure to the red virus. Ilona and Shersheba return to the pyramid to tell Malakat of the cure, crazed with power Malakat reveals his true colours forcing Shersheba to flee with the cure taking it back to the Ocean Planet. Ilona joins Neri and Mera back on the island as Neri is resolved to sacrifice herself in order to destroy the pyramid.
78	26	"The Queen"	Colin Budds	Barbara Bishop	22 December 1997
Asleep on her island late at night, Neri has a vision of her mother, who tells Neri that it is "her time", but Neri admits that she is afraid of what is to come. On the Ocean Planet, Shersheba is taken prisoner by Garron, on Malakat's order, upon arriving. She tells Garron that she has brought the cure to the virus – but will only release it if she is recognised as their leader. Neri stops at ORCA to discuss with the Bates family her plans to go to the pyramid. Neri asks H.E.L.E.N., who has been in contact with the underwater pyramid, to ask it to allow her to enter the pyramid undetected. Through H.E.L.E.N., the pyramid directs Neri to the "cave of light" in the outback. In the underwater pyramid, Malakat orders the pyramid to destroy ORCA, but soon after Neri and Jason arrive and start the process to destroy the pyramid. Just as they are about to finish, Shalamorn enters the central chamber and retakes control of her pyramid. It is revealed that Malakat did not kill Shalamorn but kept her in a state of suspended animation on the Ocean Planet as he schemed to take over. Upon returning to the Ocean Planet, Shersheba discovered this and set her free. For their actions, Shalamorn exiles Malakat, but pardons Shersheba since she brought the cure back to the Ocean Planet and released her from Malakat's hold. In a ceremony in the underwater pyramid's central chamber, Neri is crowned Princess, and Heir to the Throne, by her mother. Neri is chosen by her mother to remain on Earth to unite their world. Jason tells Neri he is happier than Charlie that she will be staying and they kiss.

== See also ==
- List of underwater science fiction works
