= Hank Williams: Lost Highway (musical) =

- Playbill image for Manhattan Ensemble Theatre Production
- Music: Hank Williams
- Lyrics: Hank Williams
- Book: Randal Myler & Mark Harelik
- Setting: From the hills of rural southern Alabama to the stage of the Grand Ole Opry
- Basis: Life & Music of Hank Williams
- Premiere: April 13, 1987: Denver Center Theatre, Denver, CO
- Productions: 1988 Mark Taper Forum (Los Angeles, CA); 1992 Old Globe Theatre (San Diego, CA); 1996-1997 Ryman Auditorium (Nashville, TN); 1998-2002 National Tour; 2002-2003 Manhattan Ensemble Theatre (New York, NY); 2003 Little Shubert Theatre (New York, NY)

Hank Williams: Lost Highway is a stage musical written by Randal Myler and Mark Harelik, featuring the music of country legend Hank Williams and telling stories of his life. The show premiered at the Denver Center Theater in 1987.

== History ==
Randal Myler and Mark Harelik first worked together on a Hank Williams musical in 1979, when they premiered "There'll Be No Teardrops Tonight" at the Pacific Conservatory of the Performing Arts (PCPA) in Santa Maria, CA, where Harelik was a regular performer for many years and Myler a resident director. Myler created and directed the show, with Harelik performing the role of Hank Williams. In the director's notes, Myler described the show as "a collection of actual stories, insights, and bits of poetry and gossip" about Hank Williams. The production also starred Richard Riehle and Powers Boothe and was well received by local critics.

In 1982 the show was produced at PCPA again, with a new title "Hank Williams, King of Country Music", with TV/film actor Troy Evans as Hoss and Harelik again in the Hank Williams role.

In 1985, Harelik & Myler were set to stage the production at the Denver Center Theater when the music company pulled the rights, making it impossible to do the show. As a replacement, Myler and Harelik quickly wrote "The Immigrant - A Hamilton County Album" which ran at the Denver Center for two seasons before moving to the Mark Taper Forum in Los Angeles, the Arena Stage in Washington D.C., the American Conservatory Theater in San Francisco, and many other regional theatres.

By 1986 the music licensing rights had been sorted out and the production was set to premiere at the Denver Center in April 1987. Tickets were sold for the show with the title "Lonesome Highway: The Music and Legend of Hank Williams", but the show ultimately opened as "Lost Highway: The Music and Legend of Hank Williams".

Harelik has described the earlier PCPA show as "a musical revue with verbal connective tissue", while Lost Highway is "a play with music".

== Synopsis ==
The show opens on the news of Hank's death, with Hank's ghost observing various reactions to the news, then proceeds to tell the story of his life, including his friendship with a bluesman, "Tee Tot" (a.k.a. Rufus Payne), who taught him to play; his courting and marriage to first wife Audrey; his rise to stardom; and his struggles with alcoholism as they cause considerable turmoil in his career and personal life.

In addition to Hank, Tee Tot, and Audrey, other real-life characters portrayed in the show include Hank's mother Lilly, and music publishing magnate Fred Rose. Fictionalized versions of Hank's bandmates the Drifting Cowboys are also featured.

== Musical Numbers ==
Act I

- "This is the Way I Do" - Tee-Tot
- "Message to my Mother" - Hank
- "Thank God" - Hank, Mama, and Company
- "WPA Blues" - Hank
- "Long Gone Lonesome Blues" - Tee-Tot, Hank
- "Settin' the Woods on Fire" - Hank & The Drifting Cowboys
- "Sally Goodin'" - Leon
- "Honky Tonk Blues" - Hank & The Drifting Cowboys
- "I'm Telling You" - Audrey & The Drifting Cowboys
- "I Can't Help It (If I'm Still in Love With You)" - Hank and The Drifting Cowboys
- "I'm So Lonesome I Could Cry" - Hank and The Drifting Cowboys
- "Jambalaya (on the Bayou)" Hank and The Drifting Cowboys
- "Move it on Over" - Hank and The Drifting Cowboys
- "Mind Your Own Business" - Hank and The Drifting Cowboys
- "Lovesick Blues" - (Hank and The Drifting Cowboys)

Act II

- "The Blood Done Sign My Name" - Tee-Tot
- "Happy Rovin' Cowboy" - Hank and The Drifting Cowboys
- "I'm Gonna Sing, Sing, Sing" - Hank, Audrey, and The Drifting Cowboys
- "Long Gone Lonesome Blues (reprise)" - Hank, Tee-Tot, and The Drifting Cowboys
- "Way Downtown" - The Drifting Cowboys
- "I'm So Lonesome I Could Cry (reprise)" - Hank
- "I'm a Run to the City of Refuge/A House of Gold (medley)" - Tee-Tot, Hank
- "Hey, Good Lookin'" - Hank and The Drifting Cowboys
- "I Saw the Light" - Hank, Hoss
- "Lost Highway" - Hank, Tee-Tot
- "Your Cheatin' Heart" - Hank and The Drifting Cowboys
- "I Saw the Light" - Company

== Productions ==
The original production opened at the Denver Center Theater on April 13, 1987. The production was co-written and directed by Randal Myler, with Mark Harelik in the lead role (and also co-writer).

After a successful season in Denver, the production was mounted at the Mark Taper Forum in Los Angeles, CA. The show opened on July 7, 1988 and ran through August 21, 1988. The show was again directed by Randal Myler, and Mark Harelik again played the lead role. Other cast members included Ron Taylor (original plant in Little Shop Of Horrors) as Tee-Tot, Cassie Yates as Audrey, Grammy winner Keb' Mo' as Peen, Dan Wheetman (fiddler from John Denver's band) as Loudmouth and Molly McClure as Mama Lilly.

Following the limited run at the Mark Taper Forum, the production was next presented at the Old Globe Theatre in San Diego, CA, opening August 28, 1992 and closing on October 4, 1992. Randal Myler directed and Mark Harelik continued in the lead role (with noted television actor Michael Bryan French subbing two days a week), and Ron Taylor again played Tee-Tot.

In 1996 Lost Highway opened at the Ryman Auditorium in Nashville, with Tennessee singer Jason Petty in the lead role. While Petty had portrayed Hank and other country legends in numerous musical revues at Opryland, Lost Highway was his first starring role in a feature production. In the initial run at the Ryman, Petty was described as looking remarkably similar to Williams, and doing an "un-canny job of recreating" Williams' phrasing.

The show ran for two seasons at the Ryman, before going on tour, with Petty continuing in the lead role, playing theaters primarily in the southern, eastern, and midwestern United States from 1998 until 2002. A new production (directed by Myler) then opened off-Broadway at the Manhattan Ensemble Theater, and then moved to the Little Shubert where it ran through August 2003. The show garnered numerous Off-Broadway award nominations (for both Myler and the production), including Petty winning an Obie award in 2003 for his performance. The New York production also featured stage/film veterans Margaret Bowman and Myk Watford.

== Cast Recording ==
Hank Williams: Lost Highway Original Cast Recording was released by Varese Sarabande records on August 19, 2003, and features Jason Petty singing the role of Hank and Michael Howell singing Tee-Tot. The recording features 25 tracks, omitting "WPA Blues" and "I'm Gonna Sing, Sing, Sing", and includes acting segments between songs.
