= Aya (1990 film) =

- Film poster
- Directed by: Solrun Hoaas
- Written by: Solrun Hoaas
- Produced by: Solrun Hoaas; Denise Patience
- Starring: Eri Ishida; Nicholas Eadie; Chris Haywood
- Cinematography: Geoff Burton
- Edited by: Stewart Young
- Music by: Roger Mason
- Production company: Goshu Films
- Distributed by: Home Cinema Group; Ronin Films
- Release dates: 7 September 1990 (Canada); 24 October 1991 (Australia)
- Running time: 95 minutes
- Country: Australia
- Language: English
- Budget: A$1.8 million
- Box office: A$40,400

Aya is a 1990 Australian film directed by Solrun Hoaas and starring Eri Ishida, Nicholas Eadie, and Chris Haywood. The plot is about a marriage between an Australian man and Japanese war bride.

== Plot ==
Aya, a Japanese war bride, arrives in a small Australian town during the 1950s with her husband. She is still very much in love with her husband, named Frank, but she somehow feels more comfortable with Mac, a friend of Frank's who can speak Japanese.

== Cast ==
- Eri Ishida as Aya
- Nicholas Eadie as Frank
- Chris Haywood as Mac
- Tim Robertson as Willy
