= Ocean Girl =

Television series

- Also known as: Ocean Odyssey
- Genre: Science fiction; Drama; Adventure
- Created by: Jonathan M. Shiff
- Directed by: Mark DeFriest; Brendan Maher; Colin Budds
- Starring: Marzena Godecki; David Hoflin; Jeffrey Walker; Alex Pinder; Kerry Armstrong; Liz Burch; Tharini Mudaliar; Lauren Hewett; Gregory Ross; Jacalyn Prince; Nicholas Bell
- Composers: Garry McDonald; Laurie Stone
- Country of origin: Australia
- Original language: English
- No. of series: 4
- No. of episodes: 78 (list of episodes)

Production
- Executive producers: Jonathan M. Shiff; Jennifer Clevers
- Producer: Jonathan M. Shiff
- Cinematography: Craig Barden; Ron Hagen
- Camera setup: Multi-camera
- Running time: 24 minutes
- Production company: Jonathan M. Shiff Productions

Original release
- Network: Network 10
- Release: 29 August 1994 – 22 December 1997

Related
- The New Adventures of Ocean Girl

Ocean Girl (known as Ocean Odyssey in the UK) is an Australian science fiction television series aimed for family audiences and starring Marzena Godecki as the lead character. The show is set in the near future, and focuses on an unusual girl named Neri who lives alone on an island, and the friendships she develops with the inhabitants of an underwater research facility called ORCA (Oceanic Research Centre of Australia). The show is an example of deep ecology science fiction.

Ocean Girl inspired an animated series, The New Adventures of Ocean Girl, which ran from 2000 to 2001 and has since been released on DVD. The animated series is in a distinct reboot separate from the original live-action show.

== Plot ==
Neri is a young girl with an affinity for water, the ability to swim long distances and super-human lung capacity. She lives alone on an otherwise deserted island, and sleeps in a nest in a tree. Early in the first series, Neri befriends two Australian boys; Jason & Brett Bates. The Bates brothers live in an elaborate underwater research and environmental protection facility called ORCA (Oceanic Research Centre of Australia) located near Port Douglas, Queensland. At the beginning of the series, their mother, Dr. Dianne Bates, has been assigned to ORCA to study whale song in the hopes of facilitating cross-species communication. A significant portion of the series takes place on ORCA itself, and looks at the activities of its inhabitants, which includes the school-aged children of the resident scientists, such as Jason and Brett. Jason discovers Neri while on a whale-tracking expedition with his mother. While attempting to tag a whale using a harpoon from the boat, Jason is startled by a girl (Neri) who appears in the water and positions herself between Jason and the whale, saying "No, no!", Jason freezes and fails to release the harpoon. Dr. Bates rushes out to the ship's deck, grabs the harpoon and tags the whale, albeit missing the intended target area. Dr. Bates is furious with Jason and doesn't believe his story about a girl appearing in the water. No one believes Jason at first and he is ridiculed by the other children on ORCA. Brett is the second character to know of Neri's existence. Brett and Jason's friendship with Neri is at first a highly guarded secret due to Neri's fear of other humans.

As the series progresses, it is revealed that Neri came to Earth on a spaceship with her father when she was young, though his death soon after the ship's crash left Neri to fend for herself. Prior to meeting Jason and Brett, Neri's only friend was a humpback whale (a jali in Neri's native tongue) whom she names 'Charlie' and with whom she can communicate. Later in the series, Neri's curiosity leads her to explore ORCA, while Dr. Bates' study of Charlie's whale song helps her identify Neri as the intended recipient of that song. Eventually, Dr Bates and her assistant, Dr. Winston Seth, become embroiled in Jason and Brett's effort to keep Neri a secret, while also performing numerous tests on Neri to understand how she's able to communicate with whales.

At the same time that the Bates family learn about Neri, a rival research organisation, the UBRI Corporation, are introduced. Headed by the sinister Dr. Hellegren, UBRI have learned that a spacecraft landed somewhere in the vicinity of ORCA, and begin their own search for any personnel that may have survived. Simultaneously, they work on other projects which threaten the natural ecology of the ocean around ORCA. Eventually, they put in play an effort to build the so-called 'ORCA City', an elaborate underwater construction that will likely eradicate much of the natural life on the seabed. In response, Dr. Bates' mission changes over the course of the series from cetologist to environmental protectionist. This role becomes more prominent beginning with the third season, when UBRI representatives establish themselves on board ORCA. Accordingly, the series shifts to a more serious tone in its later seasons.

As Neri gradually discovers more of her island and ORCA, she also begins to understand her greater purpose. This self-awakening is particularly enhanced by encounters with others of her kind. In the second season, she discovers her sister, Mera, and the two are given the opportunity to return to their home planet. Mera avails herself of this option, but Neri stays, feeling that she must discover what her father was trying to do on Earth.

In the third season, she gains entry into the downed spacecraft that originally brought her to Earth. There, she finds another of her people in suspended animation. The new character, Kal, proves to be the son of the commander of the vessel, and helps her tap into the ship's memory core. She finds the ship's log, in which Kal's mother explains that Neri's father was to repair the damage done to Earth's oceans with an advanced device called the Synchronium. She then dedicates her life to her father's cause, giving her a genuine sense of purpose that she had perhaps lacked earlier in the series. Kal grows jealous of the strong bond between Neri and Jason Bates, and begins hating Neri's friends on ORCA. As protest, Kal leaves the island. Neri and her ORCA mates go looking for him, but are unable to find him as he's been captured by UBRI. UBRI tricks Kal into believing that the male should lead (as he had been indoctrinated into the matriarchal social mores of his people), and he creates an alliance with Dr. Hellegren to steal the Synchronium pieces that Neri and Mera have hidden in a secret cave. Hellegren has no further use for Kal, who realizes he has been deceived. At the last minute, Kal intervenes to prevent Hellegren and his associate from using the Synchronium to destroy the world, allowing Neri and Mera to use it to heal the oceans and repair the fault line that UBRI's blasting had broken open, destabilizing the Earth's crust.

In the fourth season, when a mysterious underwater pyramid is discovered in the ocean, Neri and the Bates boys enter it and discover more about the Ocean Planet, and Neri's mission on Earth. In the process, they are transported to Egypt and encounter rebels from the Ocean Planet who area seeking to use the pyramid's power to weaken humanity enabling them to conquer Earth, as well as agents from PRAXIS who seek to capture Neri.

When the rebellion in the Ocean World is growing, Mera escapes to Earth and is reunited with Neri. But PRAXIS sees this pyramid as a danger to the Earth. Much of the final series is thus concerned with PRAXIS' attempt to attack the pyramid, as well as with a 'Red Virus' which is spreading in the oceans of Neri's home world, the Ocean Planet. Eventually, in the series finale, Jason, Brett, and Neri are able to repulse PRAXIS' efforts and the rebellion, and Earth is saved. Neri remains on Earth as the ambassador of the Ocean Planet, and she and Jason finally become a couple.

== Production ==
As Neri begins her father's mission, she is drawn farther and farther away from her island. Beginning in the middle of the third season, some episodes are primarily based on land. By the fourth season, some episodes are set in Egypt, and her father's quest eventually leads her back to the 'Ocean Planet', her home planet. Most of the plots involving the secondary kids on ORCA are reduced in the final season, in order to allow for greater exploration of Neri's home world. Several new characters of Neri's species are introduced. Likewise, the threat of UBRI fades, to be replaced by a new organization, PRAXIS (Preventative Response and eXtraterritorial Intelligence Service) and by rebels on the Ocean Planet. This group is dedicated to protecting against any threats posed by extraterrestrial life, and its agents come to believe Neri and her people are a problem for Earth. They thus chase Neri and the Bates boys around the world.

While the primary cast gets new motivations by UBRI's move to ORCA and Kal's appearance on the island, the secondary cast radically changes at the outset of the third season. All of the original kids are replaced by a new crew, and more adults are added to the ORCA staff.

The Bates family, Winston, Neri, Charlie, and the ORCA computer H.E.L.E.N. (Hydro Electronic Liaison ENtity) are the only constant characters for the show's entire run. However, the part of Dr. Bates is recast with Liz Burch after the second season and H.E.L.E.N. is 'upgraded' in the fourth and final season.

== Cast ==
=== Main cast ===
Series' main characters left to right: Neri, Brett, and Jason

- Marzena Godecki as Neri (seasons 1–4)
  - The title character and main protagonist of the series. Neri is an alien from the planet known as the Ocean Planet. She is the carrier of the 'Gift' she inherited from her mother that enables her to talk with the humpback whale designated as "Charlie" (it is revealed in the second season that when Neri fell from a cliff as a child and the whale rescued her, Neri had somehow passed the 'Gift' to the whale), superhuman strength, the ability to breathe underwater for long periods of time, swim to great depths and the ability to heal, stop people from dying and put people to sleep. As the series progresses she becomes the main love interest of Jason Bates.
- David Hoflin as Jason Bates (seasons 1–4)
  - The oldest son of Dr. Dianne Bates and brother to Brett Bates. He is one of the protagonists of the series. Unhappy with his mother's transfer to ORCA, Jason is the first person to learn about Neri, as she reveals herself to him to protect Charlie when his mother is trying to put a tracker on the whale to study his song. As the series progresses, Jason becomes extremely protective of Neri and the leader of each group of kids who stay at ORCA and discover Neri to stop UBRI when they capture Charlie and preventing them from capturing Neri and Mera and PRAXIS. He eventually starts developing romantic feelings for Neri and becomes her love interest.
- Jeffrey Walker as Brett Bates (seasons 1–4)
  - Youngest son of Dr. Dianne Bates and brother of Jason Bates. Brett is portrayed as a bit of a troublemaker and, unlike his brother, Brett is much more accepting of his mother's transfer to ORCA and after discovering Neri, Brett, like his brother becomes extremely protective of her and helps aid in stopping UBRI and PRAXIS. It is hinted during the second season that Mera is meant to be his love interest, though this is never fully explored.
- Alex Pinder as Dr. Winston Seth (seasons 1–4)
  - Dr. Dianne Bates' assistant on ORCA. He is portrayed often making random metaphors depending on the difficulties the Bates family and Neri faces. At first him and Dr. Bates are unaware that it is Neri that they are hearing having a conversation with Charlie and as they upgrade their equipment they eventually start learning more, though at first not suspecting that it is a girl the whale is talking to but an unknown mammal. When Neri is discovered, Winston also helps protect her and keeps her abilities secret out of fear of the harm that will be done to her by other scientists if she is discovered.
- Kerry Armstrong (seasons 1–2) and Liz Burch (seasons 3–4) as Dr. Dianne Bates
  - The mother of Brett and Jason, Dianne first comes to ORCA to try and learn to communicate with whales by studying the whale songs of the lone male humpback whale in the vicinity of ORCA. While at first unaware of Neri and Charlie's connection and ability to communicate, upon discovering Neri, she becomes completely obsessed with her and constantly puts Neri through a series of test trying to understand how Neri communicates with Charlie until Jason points out that Neri looks to her as family, as Neri begins to see Dianne as a mother figure. She begins to lighten up and becomes very motherly with Neri and starts to see her as a daughter. She even becomes very protective of Neri. In the second season, she switches her focus from learning to communicate with Charlie to making a dictionary of the different types of sounds he makes, with Neri's help. After the discovery of Mera, she would become a mother figure for Mera as well. In the third season, both her attempts to communicate with whales and producing a whale dictionary are dropped for unknown reasons and she is made the new environmental officer of ORCA. In the fourth season she is promoted to the commander of ORCA.
  - For unknown reasons, after the second season, Dr. Bates is recast.

=== Reccurring ===
- Nicholas Bell as Dr. Hellegren (seasons 1–3)
  - Head of UBRI and the main antagonist of the first three series. In season one, he has one of his staff infiltrated ORCA to steal Dr. Bates' recordings and uses them to capture Charlie. In the second season, after crashing his plane in the ocean near ORCA trying to locate Charlie after his return from migration, he is rescued by Neri and after she escapes him, he becomes completely obsessed with discovering who Neri is, even realizing that she is the one who can communicate with the whale. He also takes a keen interest in Mera, Neri's sister, and when Jason and a group of kids from ORCA help Mera escape from his clutches, he becomes not only obsessed but determined to track down both Neri and Mera for his own personal gain. In the third season, UBRI makes the highest bid for construction of ORCA City, the first ever underwater civilization, and upon learning about Kal (who he captures and brainwashes to help him) and the Synchronium, he becomes completely unhinged and mad with the idea of obtaining its power to control the ecosystem. It is also revealed in the third season that he has a daughter named Lena, who, after her mother died, he has been shipping off to different boarding schools and ski vacations due to his main focus being his work for UBRI and having no time to raise her. Lena, upon learning of her father's inhumane treatment of ocean life and the ecosystem, turns on him and runs away to ORCA to help protect Nera and stop her power hungry father. Hellegren feels betrayed by his daughter but during the climax of the final episode, when Lena jumps into the ocean to sacrifice her life to stop him from using the Synchronium, his love for his daughter finally snaps him out of his lust for power. He is last seen stranded with Lena on an island and she sits down next to him and takes his hand to hold it and he is seen smiling at her finally at peace and happy and content with just having her at his side.
  - Dr. Hellegren only appears in the final three episodes of season one, while in seasons two and three he is a recurring character.
- Lauren Hewett as Mera (seasons 2–4)
  - Neri's long lost sister who was introduced in the second season. When the spaceship carrying Neri and her family to Earth has technical issues and begins to descend, Neri and Mera's father (who feared that Mera would not survive the crash as she was only a baby at the time) put Mera into a pod and ejected it from the ship, however, due to the ship heading to crash land in the Pacific Ocean, was unable to follow its trajectory. She was eventually found floating in the ocean and was taken into the foster care system where she was constantly moved from home to home as the foster parents did not want to deal with her odd behaviors, particularly her insistence on taking long baths or showers. She was eventually put into an institute for gifted children where she attracted the attention of Doctor Hellegren. However before he could have her taken to UBRI, Jason and the other kids from ORCA convince her to come with them to meet Neri. Mera, at first, has trouble adjusting to her new life and identity, becoming very unhappy and depressed, as well as regretting her decision to come to stay with Neri on Neri's island. With the help of Neri, Mera begins to unlock 'Gift' both her and Neri inherited from their mother, even eventually being able to communicate with Charlie and finally is happy as she starts to feel like she's found where she belongs. However, after UBRI's failed attempt to capture both Neri and Mera, Mera becomes unhappy and depressed again because of how she feels that UBRI will not ever stop chasing her or Neri and being trapped in ORCA to stop any further attempts of capture. When a man and a woman of their people from the Ocean Planet appear and offer to take them back to their home planet, Mera agrees to go with them. She eventually returns to Earth to help Neri in her quest for the Synchronium pieces and stop the destruction of both the Earth and the Ocean Planet during the third series and in the fourth series she returns once again after fleeing the Ocean Planet due to uprising by rebels upset at what is happening to their planet by a spreading red virus and once again helps Neri to stop the destruction of both the Earth and the Ocean Planet.
  - At an unspecified point during Mera's time in the foster care system, she was given the name 'Jane Seaforth'.
  - Mera does not appear in the first four episodes of season two. In season three, Mera is briefly seen in episode 13 and makes her full return in episode 21 until the character leaves at the end of the season finale. In season four, Mera is not seen or makes any appearance in the first 13 episodes and returns in episode 14 onwards.

=== Other cast ===
While Ocean Girl featured the ensemble cast listed above, there were several characters who appeared for one season each, with four children appearing in two seasons each (three in seasons 1 and 2, one in seasons 3 and 4) as well as a few adults appearing in more than one series. Most of the cast changes were explained by their 'friends' (or rather, their parents) having been transferred back to shore, with the exception of season 4, where it was not noted at all.

- Jeremy Angerson as Kal (season 3)
- Brooke "Mikey" Anderson as Cassandra 'Cass' Clayborn (seasons 3–4)
- Gregory Ross as Paul Bates (season 4)
- Tharini Mudaliar as Shersheba (season 4)
- Rhona Rees as Ilona (season 4)
- Terry Serio as Captain Sam Phillips (season 2)
- Pamela Rabe as Commander Byrne (season 2)
- Joel De Carteret as Froggy (seasons 1-2)
- Cassandra Magrath as Zoe (seasons 1-2)
- Jacalyn Prince as Vanessa (season 1-2)
- Joelene Crnogorac as Lena Hellegren (season 3)
- William McInnes as Commander Lucas (season 1)
- Verity McIntyre as Morgan Clayborn (seasons 3-4)
- Nina Landis as H.E.L.E.N. (voice only; seasons 1-4)
- Petra Yared as Patti (season 3, episode 16)
- Caitlin McDougall as Caitlin McDougall (season 2)
- Anthony Hawkins as Searcher #1 (season 2, episodes 11-13) and Male Elder (season 4, episodes 14 & 16)
- Michael Veitch as First Officer Danton (season 4, 10 episodes)
- Samuel Johnson as Robert 'Rocky' Rhodes (season 1)
- Liz Burch as Dr Dianne Bates (seasons 3-4)

== Broadcast history ==
UK series logo

The original Ocean Girl series ran on Australia's Network Ten between 1994 and 1997. Internationally, it was broadcast by The Disney Channel in the United States, Discovery Kids in the United Kingdom, YTV and Radio-Canada in Canada, TV Nova and Supermax in the Czech Republic, Sri Lanka Rupavahini Corporation in Sri Lanka, TRT 1 in Turkey, TSI in the Italian part of Switzerland, ZDF and KI.KA in Germany, on RTÉ One and RTÉ Two in Ireland, on RTL 4 in the Netherlands, on (TV2) in Denmark, on NRK and TV2 in Norway, on Fox Kids in Latin America, on TVP 1 (Poland), on TV4 in Sweden, on Canal Panda in Portugal, on Arutz HaYeladim and IETV in Israel, on ZBC in Zimbabwe, on ATV World in Hong Kong, on TV3 in Malaysia, on Channel 2 in Jordan, on Sjónvarpið in Iceland, on Premiere 12 in Singapore, on KBC in Kenya, on NBC in Namibia, on IBC in Thailand, France 2 and Canal J in France, on Duna in Hungary, TV3 in Ghana, on DTV Channel 8 in Guyana and on Channel 33 in the United Arab Emirates. The Disney Channel began airing the series on 3 October 1994, but only aired the first three series; the last was not broadcast. Discovery Kids regularly broadcast all four series in continuous loops until 2003. The first two series were also broadcast in South Africa by the SABC at the same time as in Australia.

In the UK, the show was broadcast under the title Ocean Odyssey on BBC Two. It was aired in 1995, with a subsequent re-airing in 2002, although for unknown reasons this airing halted before Series 4 was complete. In 2004, the entire series was re-aired in full.

In Vietnam, it was aired on VTV3 twice through from 1998 to 1999 and had a total 81 episodes (instead of 78). It is unknown why this was done, but presumably scenes from several episodes were edited out and made into extra installments.

In the 2000s, the show was repeated on the ABC in Australia, as part of their ABC Kids afternoon block of children's programs. The series began airing in 2011 on children's channel ABC3.

In Perth, the series screened on West TV on Sundays at 5:30pm, with encore screenings the following Saturday at 11:30am.

== Critical reception ==
Common Sense Media gave the show a rating of 4 out of 5 stars, saying "The plot is almost as complex and twisty [as Lost]...the action is crackling and nonstop, the mysteries are many, and the lead character, Neri, is enchanting. Any scenes where she appears are pretty much guaranteed to be cool." The show was given a user rating of 8.3 out of 10 on TV.com based on 132 votes.

== DVD releases ==
All four series of the series have been released on DVD by Umbrella Entertainment in Australia (region 4).

Title	Set details	DVD release dates		Special features
Title	Set details	Region 2	Region 4	Special features
Ocean Girl – Complete First Season	Discs: 2; Episodes: 13	—N/a	7 November 2005	New introduction and audio commentaries on episodes one and thirteen by cast members Marzena Godecki (Neri) and David Hoflin (Jason Bates); Umbrella trailers
Ocean Girl – Complete Second Season	Discs: 2; Episodes: 13	—N/a	2 March 2007	—N/a
Ocean Girl – Complete Third Season	Discs: 3; Episodes: 26	18 August 2014	30 June 2008	—N/a
Ocean Girl – Complete Fourth Season	Discs: 3; Episodes: 26	10 November 2014	26 June 2009	—N/a

=== Box sets ===
Title	Set details	DVD release dates
Title	Set details	Region 2
Ocean Girl – The Girl from the Sea – Season 1 & 2	Discs: 6; Episodes: 26	19 May 2014
Ocean Girl – The Girl from the Sea – The Complete Series	Discs: 18; Episodes: 78	18 May 2015

== Ocean Girl: A New Generation ==
It was announced in 2013 among Johnathan M. Shiff Productions' upcoming series projects included a series titled Ocean Girl: A New Generation. No further information is known as to how it will relate to the original series.

== See also ==
- H_{2}O: Just Add Water
- List of underwater science fiction works
- Mako: Island of Secrets
- Naagin
