= Lauren Hewett =

Australian actress (born 1981)

- Born: 8 January 1981 (age 45); Sydney, New South Wales, Australia
- Occupation: Actress
- Years active: 1991–2001

Lauren Hewett (born 1981) is an Australian actress. She featured in roles in Ocean Girl as Mera, Halfway Across the Galaxy and Turn Left as X, and also for her role as Lara Ritchie in The Echo of Thunder. She also starred as Kathy Morgan in Spellbinder: Land of the Dragon Lord and appeared as Paul Mecurio's characters sister in Strictly Ballroom.

== Biography ==
Hewett won two Young Actors Awards at the Australian Film Institute Awards: in 1991 for the TV movie Act of Necessity and in 1993 for Halfway Across the Galaxy and Turn Left.

== Filmography ==
Year	Title	Role	Notes
1991	Act of Necessity	Samantha	TV movie
1991–1992	The Miraculous Mellops	Minon / Ebony	TV series
1991	G.P.	Narelle Olsen	Episode: "Just a Game"
1992	Kideo	Numerous Characters	TV series
1992	Strictly Ballroom	Kylie Hastings	
1992	A Country Practice	Bates Mullens	Episode: "Double Happiness: Part 2"
1993	A Country Practice	Zoe Jones	Episode: "Snakes and Ladders: Part 2"
1994	G.P.	Liza Jackson	Episode: "Double Bind"
1994	Halfway Across the Galaxy and Turn Left	X	28 episodes
1995	Mission Top Secret 2	Kat Fowler	24 episodes
1995–1997	Ocean Girl	Mera	30 episodes
1996	Home and Away	Mikki Salter	5 episodes
1997	Spellbinder: Land of the Dragon Lord	Kathy Morgan	26 episodes
1998	The Echo of Thunder	Lara Ritchie	TV movie
1998	All Saints	Tracy Hornjack	Episode: "Forget Me Not"
1999	Home and Away	Miranda Porter	7 episodes
1999	The Millennium Disaster: Computer Crash 2000	Tina Hagemann	TV movie
2001	All Saints	Amy Watson	Episode: "Chains of Love"
2001	Cubbyhouse	Bronwyn McChristie	

== Awards and nominations ==
Year	Award	Category	Title of work	Result
1991	Australian Film Institute Award	Best Juvenile Performance	Act of Necessity	Won
1993	Australian Film Institute Award	Young Actor's Award	Halfway Across the Galaxy and Turn Left	Won
