= Angie Milliken =

Australian actress

- Born: Brisbane, Queensland, Australia
- Occupation: Actress

Angie Milliken is an Australian actress.

== Early life ==
Milliken was born and raised in the western suburbs of Brisbane, Queensland, Australia to a musical family. She played the French horn and competed in athletic sprinting events from the age of 7 through 17.

She completed a Bachelor of Arts degree in English Literature and Sociology at the University of Queensland, before turning to acting. She was part of an alternative arts and theatre group called The Fluba Troupe.

Milliken subsequently moved to Sydney to study at National Institute of Dramatic Art (NIDA) where she completed a three year Diploma of Acting.

== Career ==
Milliken first became noticed when she starred in the 1991 made-for-TV movie Act of Necessity for which she was nominated for an Australian Film Institute (AFI) Award.

Throughout the 1990s, Milliken starred as Jo Moody in a series of telemovies with Robert Taylor, called The Feds, and in 1999 starred in Paperback Hero, as well as guest starring on Farscape and Stingers. In 1992 she was in the film Eight Ball and in 1996 she memorably featured in Dead Heart.

She regularly performed on stage for Sydney Theatre Company and became a well known face in the Australian film and television industry. In 2001, she won an AFI award for her role in My Brother Jack and then starred in the acclaimed The Shark Net (2003).

From 2003 to 2005 Milliken starred as Amanda McKay, a lawyer, on MDA, winning an AFI Award in 2003.

Milliken starred in The Condemned in 2007 and has also appeared in an episode of CSI: Miami. Milliken played Jamie Thompson's mother in This Isn't Funny in 2015.

In 2012 Milliken returned to stage acting in Benedict Andrews' Every Breath for Belvoir Street Theatre and The Effect, a joint project of the Sydney Theatre Company and the Queensland Theatre Company.

== Filmography ==
=== Film ===
Year	Film	Role	Type
1990	Harbour Beat	Simone	Film
1991	Act of Necessity	Louise Coleman	TV movie
1992	Eight Ball	Julie	Feature film
1992	Last Man Hanged	Dorothy Ryan	TV movie
1994	Talk	Stephanie Ness	Feature film
1995	Rough Diamonds	Christie Bright	Feature film
1996	What Have I Written	Sorel Atherton / Gillian	Feature film
1996	Dead Heart	Kate / Les's wife	Feature film
1999	Paradise		Short film
1999	Paperback Hero	Ziggy Keane	Feature film
2006	Solo	Kate	Feature film
2007	The Condemned	Donna Sereno	Feature film
2009	Passengers	Melony	Feature film
2014	I Can See You	Marnie's Mother	Short film
2015	This Isn't Funny	Barbara Thompson	Feature film
2017	Jungle	Stela Ghinsberg	Feature film
2019	Strangers	Adrienne	Short film
2022	Spiderhead	Sarah	Feature film
2022	Elvis	Madam Z	Feature film

=== Television ===
Year	Film	Role	Type
1989	E Street	Leanne Hanson	TV series, 4 episodes
1990	The Paper Man	Joanna Morgan	TV miniseries, 2 episodes
1992	A Country Practice	Jillian Carter	TV series, 2 episodes
1992	Six Pack	Mimi	TV series, 1 episode
1994–96	The Feds	Detective Sergeant Jo Moody	TV miniseries, 9 episodes
1996	The Beast	Elizabeth Griffin	TV miniseries, 2 episodes
1999	Beastmaster	High Priestess	TV series, 1 episode
1999	Stingers	Detective Sergeant Susan Abbott	TV series, 2 episodes
1999–2000	Farscape	Yoz / Volmae	TV series, 2 episodes
2001	My Brother Jack	Minnie Meredith	TV miniseries
2002	The Lost World	Diana	TV miniseries, 1 episode
2003	The Shark Net	Dorothy Drewe	TV miniseries, 3 episodes
2004	Through My Eyes	Joe Kuhl	TV miniseries, 2 episodes
2003–05	MDA	Amanda McKay	TV series, 34 episodes
2007	CSI: Miami	Audrey Van Der Mere	TV series, 1 episode
2012	Rake	Therese Faulkner	TV series, 2 episodes
2022	Troppo	Ingrid	TV series, 1 episode
2022	Joe vs. Carole	Crystal	TV miniseries, 2 episodes
2022	Young Rock	The Fabulous Moolah	TV series, 1 episode
2022	Darby and Joan	Felicity Ann Kemp	TV series, 1 episode

== Theatre ==
Year	Film	Role	Type
1987	Undiscovered Country		NIDA Theatre, Sydney
1988	Veneer 3		NIDA Parade Theatre, Sydney
1989	The Conquest of the South Pole		Belvoir Street Theatre, Sydney
1990	The Tempest	Miranda	Belvoir Street Theatre, Sydney
1990	Three Sisters	Irina	Sydney Opera House with STC
1991	The Master Builder		Belvoir Street Theatre, Sydney
1992	Much Ado About Nothing		Sydney Opera House with STC
1992	A Midsummer Night's Dream		Playhouse, Adelaide with STCSA
1992	'Tis Pity She's a Whore		Playhouse Adelaide with STCSA
1993	The Idiot		Crossroads Theatre, Sydney
1993	A Christmas Carol		Concert Hall, Brisbane
1994	Dead Heart		Eveleigh Railway Yards with Belvoir Street Theatre, Old Boans Warehouse with Black Swan State Theatre Company for Perth Festival
1996	Decadence		Belvoir Street Theatre, Sydney, Forum Theatre, Melbourne
1996	The Four Seasons Concerts	Narrator	Sydney Opera House
1997	The Herbal Bed		Wharf Theatre with STC
1997	Redemption	Edie	Malthouse Theatre, Melbourne with Playbox Theatre Company
1997	Closer		Wharf Theatre with STC
1999	Betrayal		Wharf Theatre with STC
2000	A Month in the Country		Sydney Opera House with STC
2000	The White Devil	Vittoria	Theatre Royal, Sydney with STC for Sydney 2000 Olympic Arts Festival & NYC tour with Brooklyn Academy of Music
2001	Three Days of Rain		Wharf Theatre with STC
2001	Don Juan		Sydney Opera House
2002	My Zinc Bed	Elsa	Belvoir Street Theatre, Sydney
2003	The Real Thing		Wharf Theatre with STC
2012	Every Breath	Lydia	Belvoir Street Theatre
2014	The Effect	Dr Lorna James	Wharf Theatre with STC & Queensland Theatre, Southbank Theatre with MTC
2016	Romeo and Juliet	Lady Capulet	Sydney Opera House, Canberra Theatre Centre, Fairfax Studio, Melbourne with Bell Shakespeare
2019	E-baby		Ensemble Theatre, Sydney
2019	Death of a Salesman	Linda Loman	Playhouse, Brisbane with Queensland Theatre
2020	Phaedra	Phaedra	Bille Brown Theatre, Brisbane, with Queensland Theatre
2022	Bernhardt / Hamlet	Sarah Bernhardt	Queensland Theatre

== Awards and nominations ==
Year	Nominated work	Award	Category	Result
1991	Act of Necessity	Australian Film Institute Awards	Australian Film Institute (AFI) Award for Best Actress in a Leading Role	Nominated
1991	Master Builder	Sydney Theatre Critics' Circle Award	Best Performance	Nominated
2001	My Brother Jack	Australian Film Institute Awards	AFI Award for Best Actress in a Telefeature or Mini Series	Won
2001	Angie Milliken	Centenary Medal	Achievement in the Arts	Won
2001	A Month in the Country	Mo Awards	Best Female Actor in a Play	Nominated
2001	My Brother Jack	Australian Film Institute Awards	Best Actress in a Tele-feature or Mini-series	Won
2003	MDA	Australian Film Institute Awards	AFI Award for Best Actress in a Leading Role in a Television Drama or Comedy	Won
2004	The Shark Net	Logie Awards	Most Outstanding Actress in a Drama Series	Nominated
2005	Through My Eyes	Australian Film Institute Awards	Best Supporting Actress in Television	Nominated
