= List of Heartbreak High episodes =

Australian television drama

Heartbreak High is an Australian drama created by Michael Jenkins and Ben Gannon, which follows the lives of students and staff at a multicultural Sydney high school.

The show ran from 1994 to 1996 on Network Ten and 1997 to 1999 on ABC, which some episodes airing on BBC2 in the UK ahead of their local release.

== Series overview ==
Series	Episodes	Originally released (Australia)	
Series	Episodes	First released	Last released
1	38	27 February 1994	27 November 1994
2	14	21 May 1995	13 August 1995
3	13	20 August 1995	12 November 1995
4	26	5 August 1996	11 November 1996
5	39	3 February 1997	19 June 1997
6	40	23 June 1997	8 September 1998
7	40	15 July 1999	1 December 1999

== Episodes ==
=== Series 1 (1994) ===
Heartbreak High premiered on Network Ten on 27 February 1994, and initially aired weekly at 6:30pm Sundays. The show's producers repeatedly clashed with the network over its content, with the gay-bashing storyline in episode 14 deemed inappropriate for its timeslot and prompting a scheduling change to 7:30pm Wednesdays. Episodes 37 and 38 were aired together as a two-hour season finale on Sunday 27 November 1994 at 8:30pm.

No. overall	No. in season	Title	Directed by	Written by	Original release date
1	1	"Episode 1" "The First Day (Note: Although episodes originally aired without titles, they were given them when the show was broadcast in Germany and France. Included here is a rough English translation of those titles, preferencing German titles where they differ as they aired first.)"	Michael Jenkins	Peter Neale	27 February 1994
On the first day of Year 11 at Hartley High, the new English and history teacher Christina Milano struggles to keep control of her students. Vietnamese student Jack is targeted by Rivers, the school bully. Greek-Australian student Nick chases after new girl Jodie. Original cast members include Nick (Alex Dimitriades), Irini (Elly Varrenti), Con (Salvatore Coco), Effie (Despina Caldis), George (Nico Lathouris), Christina (Sarah Lambert), Danielle (Emma Roche), Steve (Corey Page), Rose (Katherine Halliday), Chaka (Isabella Gutierrez), Rivers (Scott Major), Yola (Doris Younane), Graham (Hugh Baldwin), Deloraine (Stephen O’Rourke), Southgate (Tony Martin), Jack (Tai Nguyen), Jodie (Abi Tucker) and Ruby (Jan Adele). Bolton (Jon Pollard) would later be made a series regular.
2	2	"Episode 2" "Baptism of Fire"	Michael Jenkins	Tim Gooding	6 March 1994
Principal Deloraine bans Jodie's rap song, and shuts down the school newspaper after Rose publishes its lyrics, which sparks a freedom-of-speech revolt among the students. Nick and Jodie start dating. Danielle gets jealous when Steve flirts with another girl at a party.
3	3	"Episode 3" "Danielle the Trump Card"	Graham Thorburn	David Phillips	13 March 1994
After Southgate tries to ban soccer from the school, Christina steps up as coach. Danielle tries out as goalkeeper, however the boys don't want a girl on the team. Con spreads rumours around school about Nick and Jodie. Rivers challenges Chaka to a game of pool, and a relationship blossoms.
4	4	"Episode 4" "Conflicts"	Graham Thorburn	Craig Wilkins	20 March 1994
Southgate steps into help when the cops come after Rivers when he and Chaka get a lift home from a friend in a stolen car. Nick and Jodie spend the night together, angering his parents. Yola convinces Christina to move in with her when she feels suffocated living with her parents.
5	5	"Episode 5" "On A New Path"	Ian Gilmour	Michael Cove	27 March 1994
After a heated argument with George over school work, Nick moves in with Jodie and starts talking about leaving school. Christina is irritated by her fiancé Marco's (Nicholas Garsden) unexpected visits to her apartment. Jodie gets an offer to tour with a rock band in Melbourne. Abi Tucker (Jodie) leaves the series temporarily. Although still credited in the next five episodes, she does not return until episode 10.
6	6	"Episode 6" "State of Emergency"	Ian Gilmour	Greg Millin	3 April 1994
Chaka struggles to look after her siblings and manage the household when her mother leaves for El Salvador to find her missing father. Her friends try to help, but eventually Yola and Christina have to step in. Marco pressures Christina to set a wedding date.
7	7	"Episode 7" "Winners & Losers"	Shirley Barrett	Leon Saunders	10 April 1994
While the debating club faces off with another school, Deloraine attempts to get Hartley classed as a "disadvantaged" school to get more funding. Chaka is pursued by both Con and Rivers. Christina asks George, a former star player in his home country, to help coach the soccer team. He is reluctant at first, however is eventually convinced by Irini, before tragedy strikes.
8	8	"Episode 8" "A Painful Loss"	Shirley Barrett	Sally Webb	17 April 1994
Irini dies from her injuries in a car accident, devastating the Poulos family and Irini's sister Helen. Steve hears rumours the other driver may have been speeding. He tells Nick, causing him to self-destruct and attack a cop in rage. Helen (Barbara Gouskos) would later be made a series regular, along with Roberto (played here by Francesco Caudullo).
9	9	"Episode 9" "Family Addition"	Andrew Prowse	Tony Morphett	24 April 1994
Con is working on getting new uniforms for the school soccer team, while his mother Helen hires Stella as a housekeeper to the Poulos family. Nick tries to convince his father to stay on as coach. Peta Toppano (Stella) is added to the opening credits, replacing departing cast member Elly Varrenti (Irini).
10	10	"Episode 10" "Jodie Returns"	Andrew Prowse	Joan Sauers	1 May 1994
Jodie returns from Melbourne, and after she admits to cheating on Nick, he hits her. Marco announces that he has accepted a job offer in Perth, however Christina is reluctant to leave her students, ending her engagement. New drama teacher Phil North (Peter Phelps) arrives at the school, instantly becoming popular with the female students.
11	11	"Episode 11" "Heartthrob"	Karl Zwicky	Margaret Kelly	8 May 1994
Rose develops a crush on Phil, which intensifies when he admits to having an affair with a student at a previous school. Steve and Rivers get into a fight, and are put on school-yard duty. Stella temporarily quits housekeeping work after George criticises her marriage situation.
12	12	"Episode 12" "Bad News"	Karl Zwicky	David Phillips	15 May 1994
Danielle's younger sister Nicole (Jennifer Hardy) admits to Yola that she is pregnant. Her parents are furious when Yola keeps it confidential. Christina and Phil start dating. Rivers takes Chaka to an expensive restaurant on their first date.
13	13	"Episode 13" "Lovesick"	Ian Gilmour	Sally Webb	22 May 1994
After a jealous Rose makes comments to Christina, Phil admits to having an affair with a former student. Christina breaks up with him and he leaves school. Graham and Jodie try to save the school's music program, which is in danger of Deloraine's budget cuts. George invites Jodie to stay at the Poulos home while her sister is in town.
14	14	"Episode 14" "Who Sows Violence..."	Ian Gilmour	Tim Gooding	1 June 1994
Graham is accused of sexual harassment after helping out one of his younger students, and finds himself the target of homophobic abuse at school. Chaka's father (Frederick Miragliotta) gives an impassioned speech to the class about tolerance and Chaka decides to move to Darwin with her family. Frederick Miragliotta (Jorge) would later be cast as Albers.
15	15	"Episode 15" "School Dance"	Shirley Barrett	Craig Wilkins	8 June 1994
Rose and Jack admit their feelings for each other, and their friends try to pair them together before the school dance. At the school dance, Con sweet talks Kulcha's manager (Joy Smithers) to help Jodie's career, and Yola and Southgate get locked into a storage cupboard. Isabella Gutierrez (Chaka) is removed from the opening credits.
16	16	"Episode 16" "Changes"	Shirley Barrett	James Lee	15 June 1994
Stella's daughter Katerina show up to the Poulos home unexpectedly and begins making trouble for Nick. Rose's conservative Lebanese father (Sal Sharah) discovers that Jack is Vietnamese, and forbids her from seeing him. Ada Nicodemou (Katerina) is added to the opening credits.
17	17	"Episode 17" "Troublespots"	Andrew Prowse	Greg Millin	22 June 1994
Southgate temporarily resigns after he loses his temper with Katerina. Con and the gang make a music video for Jodie's song "Outside these Walls", where Danielle gets jealous when Steve flirts with Katerina during the shoot. Yola starts dating a married man (Ned Manning).
18	18	"Episode 18" "Trials & Tribulations"	Andrew Prowse	Helen Steel	29 June 1994
During work experience week, Nick feels insecure when Jodie gets a job singing jingles at a local recording studio. He cheats on her with Danielle while working at a local nursery. Katerina's father Dimitri (Nic Gazzana) comes to visit, and offers Kat a job at a resort he has inherited on Corfu. Alexandra Brunning (Elvie) would later be cast as Lucy.
19	19	"Episode 19" "Rivers in Trouble"	Karl Zwicky	Peter Neale	6 July 1994
Rivers struggles with his alcoholic mother Bonnie (Robyn Moase). To try and make some extra cash, Rivers unknowingly buys stolen car parts from Con, and lands himself in hot water with the police. Steve and Jodie both suspect their partners of seeing someone else.
20	20	"Episode 20" "A New Situation"	Karl Zwicky	Leon Saunders	13 July 1994
Southgate becomes acting principal when Deloraine leaves for a teaching conference, however leaves a bad first impression with the superintendent Don Summers (John Clayton). Rivers spots Nick and Danielle at a hotel and tells Steve, who confronts them during a school trip. Stephen O'Rourke (Deloraine) leaves the series temporarily, to attend award ceremonies for The Piano (produced by his wife Jan Chapman). Although still credited in the next four episodes, he does not return until episode 25.
21	21	"Episode 21" "The Phantom of Hartley High"	Ian Gilmour	Tim Gooding	20 July 1994
After Southgate refuses to let Rivers, Bolton, Steve and Katerina form a rollerblading team, he is taunted by a masked blader who starts graffitiing the school halls. Nick and Danielle find themselves excluded at school after their affair is revealed. Jack is offered a place at a selective high school. Callan Mulvey (who appears as Rivers' skating double) would later be cast as Drazic.
22	22	"Episode 22" "Who's with Who?"	Ian Gilmour	David Phillips	27 July 1994
Rumours spread around school that Con and Jodie are together. Her producer (Quinton George) tries to get rid of Con so he can make a move on her. Rose announces to the class that she is pregnant with Jack's baby, and stays at the Poulos home after her father kicks her out. Stella and George grow closer. Nick tries to patch things up with Steve, but is given the cold shoulder. Tai Nguyen (Jack) leaves the series, although he is still credited in the next four episodes. He would later return in a recurring role.
23	23	"Episode 23" "Overcoming Obstacles"	Shirley Barrett	Chris Roache	3 August 1994
Con enters Jodie into a televised talent contest, but later has to step in when she quits last minute. Danielle applies for a job as an aerobics instructor to keep Nick interested in her. Rivers and Steve make a bet on an upcoming exam. Andrea Moor (Greta) would later be cast as Di Barnett.
24	24	"Episode 24" "Showdown"	Shirley Barrett	Craig Wilkins	10 August 1994
Christina and Yola take on the school committee to put condom machines in the student toilets. Nick is elected class captain but Southgate doesn't think he has what it takes. Con starts dating an older woman, Greta, and meets her daughter, Rachel (Brittany Byrnes). Katerina and Rivers start dating.
25	25	"Episode 25" "Dashed Hopes"	Andrew Prowse	Sally Webb	31 August 1994
Danielle starts modelling and is manipulated into posing nude by a photographer. Con breaks up with Greta when he begins feeling used. Philanthropist Mack Winston (Peter Kowitz) gives a talk to the students about his medical work in Indonesia, and begins dating Christina. Ivar Kants replaces Francesco Caudullo as Roberto, and would later be made a series regular.
26	26	"Episode 26" "Christina's Decision"	Andrew Prowse	James Lee	7 September 1994
Mack invites Christina to work in Indonesia with him. Steve's parents divorce, and when neither parent offers to take him in, he begins sleeping at the school. Rivers is struggling with his alcoholic mother. Jodie is in an unhappy living situation with her sister. Christina and Mack step in to help and find a warehouse for Steve, Jodie and Rivers to move into.
27	27	"Episode 27" "Discoveries"	Karl Zwicky	Greg Millin	14 September 1994
After his father reveals he's adopted, Steve starts acting out and stealing food from his supermarket job. Danielle and Jodie get into a fist fight over Nick, but in the end he chooses Jodie. George quits his factory job. Stella is furious when Katerina spends the night with Rivers. Sarah Lambert (Christina), Tai Nguyen (Jack), Hugh Baldwin (Graham) and Jan Adele (Ruby) are removed from the opening credits. Baldwin would return later in guest appearances.
28	28	"Episode 28" "Farewell Katerina"	Karl Zwicky	Steve J. Spears	21 September 1994
Stella gets a job offer to teach at her grandma's dance academy in Greece, but Katerina doesn't want to leave Hartley and Rivers. Nick tries to get back together with Jodie, but she is still unwilling to forgive him. A stray dog befriends Steve but Deloraine isn't happy when he brings it to school.
29	29	"Episode 29" "Sam Arrives"	Rob Marchand	Suzanne Hawley	28 September 1994
New teacher Sam Robinson (Kym Wilson) arrives at Hartley, and becomes a target of Rivers' affections. George announces that he has a job offer back in Greece and plans to move the family there. However, Nick and Effie want to stay in Australia, and when he refuses, Nick moves in with Jodie, and Effie runs away, spending an eventful day on the streets of Kings Cross. Barbara Gouskos (Helen) and Ivar Kants (Roberto) are added to the opening credits, replacing departing cast members Peta Toppano (Stella) and Ada Nicodemou (Katerina).
30	30	"Episode 30" "Better Late than Never..."	Rob Marchand	David Phillips	5 October 1994
Deloraine suspends Rivers for sexual harassment when he gets out of control with Sam. George sells the Poulos family home, and Nick and Effie move in with Con's parents, Helen and Roberto. Lucy (Alexandra Brunning) hires Helen to cater a dinner party for her parents, and meets Steve, who is instantly smitten with her. Kym Wilson (Sam) is added to the opening credits, replacing departing cast member Nico Lathouris (George). Alexandra Brunning (Lucy) would later be made series regular.
31	31	"Episode 31" "Rocco"	Geoffrey Bennett	Serge Lazareff	12 October 1994
Roberto and Helen's eldest son, Rocco (Angelo D'Angelo), returns unannounced from America. He plans to open the Shark Pool, a pool hall, to help cover some debts. Sam tries to convince Deloraine to let Rivers come back to school. Lucy encourages Steve to search for his birth parents. After getting into a fight protecting Jodie, Nick gets interested in boxing. Southgate agrees to help him with training.
32	32	"Episode 32" "Storm's Coming"	Geoffrey Bennett	David Phillips	19 October 1994
Nick prepares for his match against his rival, Tony (Josh Picker). Steve hits a hurdle on his search for his birth mother. Rivers visits his father (Russell Kiefel) in prison. Yola starts dating local policeman Joe (Don Halbert). Effie considers dating the class geek, Bart (Ryan Lappin).
33	33	"Episode 33" "Dilemma"	Andrew Prowse	James Lee	26 October 1994
Deloraine asks Rose not to participate in the school's hosting of the Education Awards due to her pregnancy, outraging her friends. Roberto lends Rocco money to open the Shark Pool, angering Con who wanted the money for an audio engineering course. Yola is angry when Joe misses their date.
34	34	"Episode 34" "Heart-Shaped Box"	Andrew Prowse	Sally Webb	2 November 1994
Steve is shocked to discover that the person who has been following him is his birth mother, Lorraine (Jan Merriman). Rocco pits Con and Jodie against each other for a job at the Shark Pool. Rivers continues to pursue Sam and steals her motorbike in order to fix it. Yola discovers a photo of another woman in Joe's wallet.
35	35	"Episode 35" "Sex, Drugs & Rock'n'Roll"	Ian Gilmour	Chris Roache	9 November 1994
Someone plants drugs on Con at a party at the warehouse. Yola suspects Rivers and Sam are seeing each other. With some help from Southgate, Nick wins his boxing match against Tony at the Shark Pool. Tara Jakszewicz (Tanya) would later be cast as Stassy.
36	36	"Episode 36" "Breakups"	Ian Gilmour	Sally Webb	16 November 1994
Sam and Rivers's affair is discovered. Jodie is scared when Nick's boxing rival turns up to Hartley, and tells him to quit or she'll break up with him. Joe rescues Effie's boyfriend Bart when he gets stuck in a tree. Alexandra Brunning (Lucy) is added to the opening credits, replacing departing cast member Kym Wilson (Sam).
37	37	"Episode 37" "The Big Fight"	Karl Zwicky	Leon Saunders	27 November 1994
Southgate and Roberto try to talk Nick out of pursuing a professional boxing career. Tensions flair between Deloraine and Rivers after Sam's departure, however they later come together when Rose goes into contractions early and delivers the baby at school. Jack returns to rekindle his relationship with Rose. Rocco and Jodie start dating and he gets her a job as a backing singer with a band about to tour the USA.
38	38	"Episode 38" "Worried About Nick"	Karl Zwicky	David Phillips	27 November 1994
Southgate and Nick's friends try to talk Nick out of a boxing match against a tough opponent, but he is determined to go ahead. Rose's father forbids Jack from seeing his daughter. Rocco proposes to Jodie before they leave for America, however, Jodie hasn't moved on from Nick.

=== Series 2 (1995) ===
For its second series, Heartbreak High was moved to a G-rated timeslot and aired weekly at 5:30pm Sundays. This led to episode 42 being pulled from its original run due to its HIV storyline, deemed inappropriate for its new timeslot. The episode had its world premiere in the UK on BBC2 on Tuesday 3 October 1995 at 6:25pm, and eventually aired in Australia on Sunday 30 December 1995 at 7.30pm, after the third series had concluded.

No. overall	No. in season	Title	Directed by	Written by	Original release date
39	1	"Episode 39"	Andrew Prowse	David Phillips	21 May 1995
At the start of a new term, the class is still grieving Nick. Deloraine's nephew, Matt, arrives at Hartley, having been expelled from previous schools for his behaviour. Media studies teacher Vic Morris (Ernie Dingo) sets up a group video project, which becomes a tribute to Nick. Effie starts classes at Hartley. Vince Poletto (Matt) is added to the opening credits, replacing departing cast member Alex Dimitriades (Nick).
40	2	"Episode 40"	Robert Marchand	James Lee	28 May 1995
When her Aunt Jenna is taken sick Rose has no choice but to bring baby Tess into school, her classmates decide to help her keep this secret. Much to her protests, Deloraine nominates Yola to coach the basketball team when no other teachers come forward, however the team discover Vic has previous basketball experience but refuses to take on coaching duties. Vic has a change of heart after revealing a secret about his past.
41	3	"Episode 41"	Robert Marchand	Sally Webb	4 June 1995
Yaya moves into the Bordinos, the stay is short as she decides she needs her independence. With a big game coming up Vic sets up a friendly game between the girls and boys basketball teams. After losing to the girls the guys must learn about teamwork.
42	4	"Episode 42"	Andrew Prowse	Greg Millin	3 October 1995 (UK); 30 December 1995 (Australia)
Rivers, Con and Matt are searched for drugs on the street by the police. They decide to make a documentary about the police's treatment of young people, which causes problems for Vic. Steve and Lucy decide to take a STD test when she announces her ex-boyfriend has a drug problem. Rivers uses baby Tess to try and pick up women. This episode was not shown in Australia in its original run. The storyline involving Lucy's HIV scare was deemed too mature for its 5:30pm time slot. It aired at a later date at 7:30pm.
43	5	"Episode 43"	Ian Gilmour	Kristen Dunphy	11 June 1995
The boys basketball team have a feud with a rival team, after losing a match Vic arranges a rematch. After winning the rematch Vic resigns after agreeing to return to his previous school. Rose is jealous after seeing Jack hang out with a Vietnamese girl.
44	6	"Episode 44"	Ian Gilmour	Margaret Kelly	18 June 1995
Romance is everywhere as Matt interviews blind dates for Uncle Jim, Rose and Con kiss on the beach and things hot up between Southgate and Danielle's mom.
45	7	"Episode 45"	Karl Zwicky	Suzanne Hawley	25 June 1995
Southgate and Danielle's mom begin dating despite her sister, Nicole trying to get her parents back together. Jodie, Steve, Matt and Bolton try to arrange a secret birthday party for Rivers. Con and Rose kiss but decide to remain friends.
46	8	"Episode 46"	Karl Zwicky	Kit Oldfield	2 July 1995
Tensions run high as Nicole openly confronts Southgate about his relationship with her mom. Con treats Rose to a romantic dinner, which takes a turn for the worse after Rose accidentally orders tongue. Uncle Jim tries to convince Matt to move back in with him.
47	9	"Episode 47"	Geoffrey Bennett	Peter Schreck	9 July 1995
Steve mistakenly thinks Lucy is cheating on him with Jerry Shapiro before finding out the truth. After being caught on camera making inappropriate gestures towards Lucy, her mom splits up with Jerry. Yola announces to Joe that she is pregnant, however Joe isn't as enthusiastic as Yola.
48	10	"Episode 48"	Geoffrey Bennett	Chris Roache	16 July 1995
When Tess struggles to breathe Con once again comes to the rescue, however Jack is back on the scene and proposes to Rose. Yola is having second thoughts about her own pregnancy, Joe puts her at ease but later dies while on duty, leaving Yola pregnant and distraught. Jodie's sister, Karen is in town and quickly begins taking advantage of everybody around her and has her eyes firmly on Matt.
49	11	"Episode 49"	Andrew Prowse	Kris Wyld	23 July 1995
Yola returns to Hartley but struggles to adjust to life after Joe. On hearing the new of Rose and Jack's wedding plans Con decides to also propose to Rose, with tensions rising in the love triangle Con and Jack fight to settle their differences. Karen continues taking advantage of Jodie and her friends, starting a relationship with Matt and impersonating Jodie at an audition.
50	12	"Episode 50"	Andrew Prowse	Leon Saunders	30 July 1995
Rivers' father (Russell Kiefel) escapes from prison and turns up at the warehouse. Jodie has enough of Karen's behaviour and kicks her out. Karen moves in with Con and his parents, causing tensions. Katherine Halliday (Rose) is removed from the opening credits.
51	13	"Episode 51"	Ian Gilmour	David Phillips	6 August 1995
When a boat goes missing Southgate puts the blame on Rivers and Matt who have one day to discover the truth behind the robbery before the police get involved. Lucy tells Steve she is leaving for Japan as part of a foreign exchange programme.
52	14	"Episode 52"	Ian Gilmour	Sally Webb	13 August 1995
Southgate announces that he is leaving Hartley to become principal in Yanderra and invites Yola to come with him. Deloraine takes an interest in Matt's love life and invites Jodie to dinner. Steve and Danielle make a horror movie. Alexandra Brunning (Lucy) is removed from the opening credits.

=== Series 3 (1995) ===
No. overall	No. in season	Title	Directed by	Written by	Original release date
53	1	"Episode 53"	Catherine Millar	Greg Millar	20 August 1995
Sam surprises Deloraine when she returns to Hartley when a teaching position opens up, promising not to get involved again with Rivers. Con is skipping school to manage The Shark Pool, so Roberto steps into help. Effie asks Con for advice when Bart asks her for a kiss. Kym Wilson (Sam) returns to the opening credits, replacing departing cast members Doris Younane (Yola) and Tony Martin (Southgate).
54	2	"Episode 54"	Catherine Millar	Tim Gooding	27 August 1995
Katerina returns from Greece, and tries to get back with Rivers. Jodie agrees to model for Steve's photography assignment, making Matt jealous. Effie and Bart's relationship hits some hurdles. Ada Nicodemou (Katerina) returns to the opening credits.
55	3	"Episode 55"	Andrew Prowse	Carol Williams	3 September 1995
Steve discovers that his birth mother Lorraine has been lying to him, and he actually has a half-sister, Allie. Kat competes against Sam during self-defence class. Effie wants to start wearing a bra. Inge Hornstra (Allie) is added to the opening credits.
56	4	"Episode 56"	Andrew Prowse	Leon Saunders	10 September 1995
Rivers gives Hartley's new science teacher Andrew Bell a bad first impression. Andrew starts picking on him and the other students ahead of their HSC trials, causing Danielle to panic. Deloraine bribes Matt with the use of his car and holiday home if he gets top marks. Roberto scolds Con for reading an erotic novel instead of studying. Ian Bliss (Andrew) is added to the opening credits.
57	5	"Episode 57"	Karl Zwicky	Stephen J. Spears	17 September 1995
It is Allie's first day at Hartley but her parents don't know she's left her previous school. Rivers starts to take school work seriously when he is cast as director of Romeo and Juliet.
58	6	"Episode 58"	Karl Zwicky	Chris Roache	24 September 1995
Things go from bad to worse for Roberto when he gets kicked off his construction site then receives some bad news from his doctor. Con decides it is time to bond with his dad, stepping him to help save the sinking family business. Tension grows between Sam and Andrew when the students put all their focus on rehearsals for the school play. This leads Rivers to miss a homework deadline, putting his role as director in jeopardy.
59	7	"Episode 59"	Malcolm McDonald	Kris Wyld	1 October 1995
After an argument with Jodie about a lack of passion Matt decides to go all in on a science project, breaking and entering in the process. Aided by Mr Bell the students uncover how the ocean is being polluted.
60	8	"Episode 60"	Malcolm McDonald	Michael Miller	8 October 1995
Rivers’ dad is back on the scene and finding it difficult to adjust to life on the run. Jodie and Matt end their relationship but Matt moves on quicker than expected. Con expresses his feelings for Kat leading to his father giving him an awkward talk about the birds and the bees.
61	9	"Episode 61"	Catherine Millar	Sally Webb	15 October 1995
Relationships are strained. Jodie falls out with her rockstar friend Tim when he struggles with his inner demons. Allie considers breaking up with Matt after feeling like she's responsible for Matt and Jodie splitting up. Con and Kat fight over the food on offer in the canteen, leading to a cook off. Andrew and Sam hit rocky ground just as their relationship is beginning when Andrew finds out about Sam's past relationship with Rivers.
62	10	"Episode 62"	Catherine Millar	Kristen Dunphy	22 October 1995
The students begin planning for life after school but not everybody has a plan in place.
63	11	"Episode 63"	Andrew Prowse	David Phillips	29 October 1995
Con's parents are out of town and the teachers are on strike so Kat decides to throw a house party with disastrous results. Jodie and Con decide to bury the hatchet after she sacks him as her manager. Andrew and Sam are on rocky ground now that the news of her past relationship with Rivers is out.
64	12	"Episode 64"	Andrew Prowse	Greg Millin	5 November 1995
Con becomes a DJ on the school radio but Deloraine isn't happy with his constant adverts. Rivers assists Andrew with the purchase of a motorbike to impress Sam. Kat publicly announced her love for Con.
65	13	"Episode 65"	Andrew Prowse	Tim Gooding	12 November 1995
With enrolment numbers down Hartley is on the verge of closure, leading Deloraine to suffer a heart attack. Sam and Rivers get caught in the attack and decide to head off and make a new life for themselves. Jodie returns to give a dramatic speech in an effort to stop the school closure.

=== Series 4 (1996) ===
After the show was cancelled by Network Ten, Heartbreak High was entirely funded by BBC2 for series four, who aired the show weekly at 6.25pm Tuesdays. Six months after its UK premiere, Network Ten aired the season in a soap opera format, with episodes split into two and airing across four nights (Mondays to Thursdays) at 11.30pm.

No. overall	No. in season	Title	Directed by	Written by	UK air date	Australia air date
66	1	"Episode 66"	Catherine Millar	Peter Neale	26 March 1996	5 & 6 August 1996
Steve suddenly disappears, worrying Allie who is struggling to find a new roommate at the warehouse. She eventually picks Bolton to move in. Matt's father (Bruce Barry) arrives, causing tensions with his son. Later, Steve's body is found on the beach after falling off a cliff. Jon Pollard (Bolton) is added to the opening credits, replacing departing cast members Abi Tucker (Jodie), Scott Major (Rivers), Corey Page (Steve), Kym Wilson (Sam) and Despina Caldis (Effie).
67	2	"Episode 67"	Catherine Millar	Vicki Madden-Custo & Pieter Aguilia	2 April 1996	7 & 8 August 1996
New English teacher Ronnie Brooks arrives at Hartley, while the students are being questioned about Steve's death. Con feels numb and unable to work on a tribute issue of the school newspaper, while Allie sets out to prove that Steve's death wasn't a suicide. Danielle is upset when Allie lets Matt move into the warehouse, so soon after Steve's death. Deni Gordon (Ronnie) is added to the opening credits.
68	3	"Episode 68"	Geoffrey Nottage	Howard Griffiths	9 April 1996	12 & 13 August 1996
The students sign a petition to have Maths teacher Mr Pike removed. Kat and Bolton have other ideas and use Mr Pike for horse racing tips to make money after Kat damages Con's car while he is out of town. Danielle borrows money from Bolton, Allie suspects this is to buy drugs.
69	4	"Episode 69"	Geoffrey Nottage	David Phillips	16 April 1996	14 & 15 August 1996
Deloraine suffers a second heart attack and asks Matt to keep it a secret. He quietly retires in the process with a new head mistress stepping in. Danielle is expelled from school after drugs are discovered in her locker. Her friends and former head master must work together to get Danielle off the drugs and back in school.
70	5	"Episode 70"	Chris Langman	Phil McAloon & Kris Wyld	23 April 1996	20 & 21 August 1996
Dyson confiscates Bolton's rollerblades when he knocks her down in the school corridor. She bans him from the school trip, causing a revolt. Con struggles with the new manager of the Shark Pool, eventually firing him. Matt and Allie try to set Danielle up with Matt's cousin, but she ends up meeting the wrong guy. Diane Craig (Dyson) is added to the opening credits, replacing departing cast member Stephen O'Rourke (Deloraine).
71	6	"Episode 71"	Chris Langman	Kristen Dunphy	23 April 1996	22 & 26 August 1996
Con's secret is out, he's been accepted on to a foreign exchange program in LA, but the trip is almost cancelled when Kat fakes a pregnancy to keep Con from going. Allie borrows an old laptop from Mr Bell, but the other students aren't happy that she's receiving special treatment.
72	7	"Episode 72"	Karl Zwicky	Charles Strachan	7 May 1996	27 & 28 August 1996
New student and juvenile delinquent Declan arrives at Hartley, and clashes with Bolton. Matt starts a cross country team with Allie and Declan, and recruits Roberto as their coach. Rupert Reid (Declan) is added to the opening credits, replacing departing cast member Salvatore Coco (Con).
73	8	"Episode 73"	Karl Zwicky	Vincent Gil	14 May 1996	29 August – 3 September 1996
Yugoslavian Australian student Stassy arrives at Hartley, and is immediately an outcast. When she is given detention by Andrew, she lies to her father (Vincent Gil) about why she was held back, accusing Andrew of sexual harassment. Kat meets Declan's mother Maria (Elaine Lee). Tara Jakszewicz (Stassy) is added to the opening credits.
74	9	"Episode 74"	Catherine Millar	Sally Webb	21 May 1996	5 & 10 September 1996
It is Friday 13th and Danielle is spooked when she decides to stay home alone to watch scary movies. Matt and Stassy kiss during a power cut at a party while at the Shark Pool. Damien, the school cleaner is fired after repeatedly ringing Danielle and breaking into the warehouse to leaver her a teddy.
75	10	"Episode 75"	Catherine Millar	Peter Kinloch	28 May 1996	11 & 12 September 1996
Dyson's son Gary turns up at Hartley and forms an unlikely friendship with Bolton. Danielle catches Matt and Stassy kiss but keeps the secret to herself, however Allie suspects something is going on and confronts Matt, ending their relationship.
76	11	"Episode 76"	Andrew Prowse	Chris Roache	4 June 1996	16 & 17 September 1996
Declan loses more than just money when his gambling addiction gets the better of him. Stassy causes more trouble at school when she borrows Allie's homework and hands in an almost identical copy, blaming Allie for copying her work. Kat stirs the pot when she implies Matt has slept with her when he stays round the Bordinos for the night.
77	12	"Episode 77"	Chris Langman	Chris Roache	11 June 1996	18 & 19 September 1996
The students are out on work experience but Stassy and Declan have nothing arranged so bare given placements at school as teachers. Allie and Danielle both become journalists but Danielle is taken advantage of when she discloses her previous drug addiction. Bolton is a natural at carpet fitting but his boss blames him when a job goes wrong. Kat feels taken advantage of when her advertiser placement turns into a receptionist role.
78	13	"Episode 78"	Chris Langman	David Phillips	18 June 1996	23 & 24 September 1996
An old flame visits Andrew and asks him to join her on a science trip to Antarctica, Andrew eventually accepts and hands in his notice at Hartley. Matt needs resuscitating after getting an electric shock in the warehouse. Kat manages the Shark Pool but has to deal with some local yobs, her efficiency and accounting impress Roberto.
79	14	"Episode 79"	Andrew Prowse	Elizabeth Coleman	27 August 1996	25 & 26 September 1996
Bolton joins the school debating team with Allie and Matt, developing a crush on Linda (Amanda Chan), an Asian student from an opposing school's team. They begin dating, but Linda's parents disapprove because he's white. Stassy struggles to find time for school work with her increasingly stressful life at home. Katerina starts online dating. Ian Bliss (Andrew) is removed from the opening credits.
80	15	"Episode 80"	Karl Zwicky	Tim Gooding	3 September 1996	1 & 2 October 1996
New teacher Tom Summers arrives at Hartley, teaching the boys cooking, while Dyson teaches the girls auto-mechanics. Katerina catfishes her online boyfriend, Charlie, pretending to be a blonde. Declan gets a gig at the Shark Pool. Simon Baker-Denny (Tom) is added to the opening credits.
81	16	"Episode 81"	Catherine Millar	Sally Webb	10 September 1996	3 & 7 October 1996
Charlie transfers to Hartley, but Katerina is put off by his nerdy appearance. Danielle decides to volunteer to help the elderly, when she discovers her neighbour has died of a heart attack. Maria's multiple sclerosis condition worsens. Sebastian Goldspink (Charlie) is added to the opening credits.
82	17	"Episode 82"	Catherine Millar	Suzanne Hawley	17 September 1996	8 & 9 October 1996
The students are tasked with marketing a product. Kat and Charlie work on a deck chair after Kat's failed attempt at making perfume. Matt and Bolton work on "Bolton's Beads", however Matt wants to streamline production after Bolton spends too much time on the product. Stassy and Allie work on a dress but Stassy's father isn't happy for her to be wasting her time on fashion and kicks her out of the family home.
83	18	"Episode 83"	Karl Zwicky	Peter Neale	24 September 1996	10 & 14 October 1996
Tom invites basketball talent scouts to school but Dyson isn't happy. Charlie collapses and ends up in hospital after entering a race despite his heart condition. Toms girlfriend works for a publisher and agrees to look at Allies book. Allie and Matt split up after realising they are drifting apart.
84	19	"Episode 84"	Ian Gilmour	Peter Kinloch	1 October 1996	15 & 16 October 1996
Roberto realises the Shark Pool is finally starting to turn a decent profit. Rocco returns from the states and tries to convince his dad to sell the business but avoids revealing the debt he is in. Rocco steals a thousand dollars to help pay off a loan shark and pins the blame on Declan.
85	20	"Episode 85"	Ian Gilmour	Marcia Gardner, Peter Aquilia & Phil McAloon	8 October 1996	17 & 21 October 1996
Stassy starts modelling to earn money for her rent, Bolton becomes her manager but she hates the work. Declan's former band mate (and lover) visits to offer Declan a partnership in a new musical venture but Danielle is less than happy. Charlie overhauls his image to try and impress Kat but they discover they have little in common.
86	21	"Episode 86"	Andrew Prowse	Vince Gil	15 October 1996	22 & 23 October 1996
Stassy convinces Bolton she has spiritual powers, leading to them forming a cult. Allie's book has been published and Ronnie notices the story contains a lot of details about Allie's real life.
87	22	"Episode 87"	Nico Lathouris & Andrew Prowse	Kristin Dunphey	29 October 1996	24 & 28 October 1996
Allie is accepted on a fellowship in London but discovers she is pregnant. Tom is suspended after it is discovered that he's the father. Allie decides to keep the baby and take the fellowship position. Charlie tries to arrange his own birthday party just 2 days before his birthday but only 2 people accept, meanwhile Kat has arranged a surprise party for him.
88	23	"Episode 88"	Karl Zwicky	Phil McAloon	5 November 1996	29 & 30 October 1996
Mature age student Max (Jerome Ehlers) starts classes at Hartley. He immediately clashes with Ronnie, and outs Bolton as a plagiarist after he wins a poetry competition. Stassy dismisses Bolton as a friend when he confesses his love for her. Katerina is sick of Charlie paying more attention to fixing Roberto's burglar alarm than to her. Inge Hornstra (Allie) and Simon Baker-Denny (Tom) are removed from the opening credits.
89	24	"Episode 89"	Karl Zwicky	Greg Millin	12 November 1996	31 October – 4 November 1996
Bolton discovers his uncles bowling ally is due to be closed down due to a lack of income. He recruits his school friends and teachers to help save it, however corruption is going on behind the scenes with the local council having alternate plans for the land.
90	25	"Episode 90"	Catherine Millar	Howard Griffiths	12 November 1996	5 & 6 November 1996
Charlie's parents are splitting up and he's starting to drift away from his friends. Charlie ends up joining the local cult that Stassy was briefly a part of. Roberto and Helen's anniversary is coming up and Kat is worried they are also on the verge of separating.
91	26	"Episode 91"	Catherine Millar	James Lee	19 November 1996	7 & 11 November 1996
Exams are nearing and “muck-up day” is in full swing, however the class are accused of starting a fire and must prove their innocence or face missing their HSCs. Charlie finds out his computer science course requires him to move away and proposes to Kat. Danielle has been offered a job in TV and must also leave Hartley. The class bury a time capsule to be dug up in 10 years time, Kat decides to put Con's mobile phone in the capsule.

=== Series 5 (1996–97) ===
Series five premiered in the UK on BBC2 and aired weekly at 6.25pm Tuesdays. ABC picked up the show for its Australian release, and again split the episodes into two, airing them across four nights (Mondays to Thursdays) at 6pm.

No. overall	No. in season	Title	Directed by	Written by	UK air date	Australia air date
92	1	"Episode 92"	Andrew Prowse	Peter Kinloch	3 December 1996	3 & 4 February 1997
Weeks before the HSC exams, Dyson leaves Hartley to be with her son when he gets a job in Queensland. Stassy dumps Matt over his jealousy after she works with Declan on a song. Charlie and Katerina dig up the time capsule to retrieve Con's mobile phone, only to find it missing. Emma Roche (Danielle) is removed from the opening credits.
93	2	"Episode 93"	Andrew Prowse	Suzanne Hawley	10 December 1996	10 & 11 February 1997
Charlie stresses out over the upcoming exams, becoming addicted to caffeine pills. Bolton, Stassy and Bazza (Richard Cass) try to buy a copy of the upcoming history test. Ronnie is concerned about Declan, as his school work is suffering as he looks after his mother. Diane Craig (Dyson) is removed from the opening credits.
94	3	"Episode 94"	Richard Jasek	Howard Griffiths	17 December 1996	12 & 13 February 1997
The exams are finally here. Stassy is feeling superstitious over a broken mirror and her reliance on a crystal that Bolton decides to steal. Declan misses an exam so he can continue to care for his mother. Con returns so Kat tries to pick up the relationship where they left off, dumping Charlie in the process. Con drops a bombshell when he reveals he's married when his wife comes to stay.
95	4	"Episode 95"	Richard Jasek	Alexa Wyatt	7 January 1997	17 & 18 February 1997
Exams are over but the school formal is cancelled due to budget cuts. Ronnie decides to host the party at her apartment but only Declan and Melanie, a nerdy Grade 11 student, show up. Stassy takes Kat and Charlie to her cousin Andre's formal, which is crashed by a jealous Matt. Bolton hosts a successful beach party, where he is offered a job as an events organiser in Canberra. Rebecca Smart (Melanie) is added to the opening credits.
96	5	"Episode 96"	Geoffrey Bennett	David Phillips	14 January 1997	19 & 20 February 1997
Helen and Roberto leave for a trip through Europe and the USA, to visit Con. Roberto sells the Shark Pool, but is conned into believing the new owner is Melanie's dad, Tony (Jim Holt), when it is actually local criminal Leo Fine. Stassy goes undercover to expose Leo's illegal gambling ring, while Declan gets a painting job and pretends to be interested in Melanie to get closer to her father, who is Leo's financial advisor. Katerina is jealous when Charlie moves into the warehouse with Stassy. Jon Pollard (Bolton) is removed from the opening credits.
97	6	"Episode 97"	Geoffrey Bennett	Sally Webb	21 January 1997	24 & 25 February 1997
Katerina's aunt Magda (Anna Volska) moves in the Bordino home, while Katerina, Charlie, Matt and Stassy get their HSC results. Matt gets 95% but decides to take a year off to travel Australia with Stassy after she fails abysmally. Katerina also fails her exams, and after an unsuccessful dance audition, decides to move into the warehouse with Charlie and repeat their senior year. Declan is fired when he confronts his boss for using stolen paint and decides to go back to school. Barbara Gouskos (Helen) and Ivar Kants (Roberto) are removed from the opening credits.
98	7	"Episode 98"	Andrew Prowse	Leon Saunders	28 January 1997	26 & 27 February 1997
Melanie and her friend Anita are excited to start their senior year at Hartley but come into conflict with they find a stolen purse. Anita's brother Ryan returns to Sydney after being kicked out of his father's house, his mother Hilary let him move in on the condition that he repeats his HSC. Declan moves into the warehouse with Charlie and Katerina, after his mother is moved into a nursing home and he is evicted from their apartment. Charlie befriends Ryan who gives him advice when he buys a shoddy car from Leo. Rel Hunt (Ryan), Lara Cox (Anita) and Tina Bursill (Hilary) are added to the opening credits, replacing departing cast members Vince Poletto (Matt) and Tara Jakszewic (Stassy).
99	8	"Episode 99"	Andrew Prowse	Serge Lazareff	4 February 1997	3 & 4 March 1997
A new school year begins. New principal Les Bailey enforces strict guidelines and recruits Melanie as his student liaison officer, where she comes into conflict with bad boy Drazic. Katerina is made manager of the Shark Pool, but the power goes to her head, causing tensions with Charlie and Declan. Callan Mulvey (Drazic) and Peter Sumner (Les) are added to the opening credits.
100	9	"Episode 100"	Daphne Paris	Vicki Madden-Custo	11 February 1997	5 & 6 March 1997
Principal Bailey continues to lay down the law, sending letters home to Declan and Ryan's parents. Declan decides he is done with school and refuses both Bailey's and Robbie's offers to return. The recent heatwave has caused Kat to befriend Drazic after he installs a fan at the warehouse, much to the frustration of Charlie.
101	10	"Episode 101"	Daphne Paris	Phil McAloon	18 February 1997	10 & 11 March 1997
Declan finds a new job at the hospital but had difficulty fitting in until he befriends a patient. Ronnie brings in a model for the students to try life drawing, Principal Bailey takes issue to this when the class receives an influx of male students. Kat is angry that Charlie forgot their 6 month anniversary.
102	11	"Episode 102"	Karl Zwicky	Peter Kinloch	25 February 1997	12 & 13 March 1997
Ryan and Anita's father Jeff (Andrew McFarlane) is in town and while Anita is more than happy to accommodate him Ryan wants nothing to do with him. Drazic continues to cause trouble between Charlie and Kat, joyriding Charlie's car and crashing it into Principal Bailey's car. Declan asks Mel to cover for him at the shark pool but the job is not all it is cracked up to be after Kat assigns Mel to cleaning duties.
103	12	"Episode 103"	Karl Zwicky	Howard Griffiths	4 March 1997	17 & 18 March 1997
Mel buries the hatchet with Kat by inviting her to the cinema. The new friends then organise a party for Mel, running up her credit cards. Ryan's dad asks him to leave school and join the family business but there's a catch.
104	13	"Episode 104"	Andrew Prowse	David Phillips	11 March 1997	19 & 20 March 1997
New student Mai arrives at Hartley and quickly gets involved in the school magazine. Declan leaves to pursue a career in nursing.
105	14	"Episode 105"	Andrew Prowse	Sally Webb	18 March 1997	24 & 25 March 1997
Les kicks Charlie off the volleyball team for Ryan and Drazic, but comes crawling back to him when they can't get along. Mai and Anita gatecrash a conference to protest against fur, however Mai leaves Anita behind to answer to the police. Katerina and Charlie are broke and desperate for a new roommate at the warehouse, eventually getting Mai to move in. Nina Liu (Mai) is added to the opening credits, replacing departing cast member Rupert Reid (Declan).
106	15	"Episode 106"	Jessica Hobbs	Kevin Roberts	25 March 1997	26 & 27 March 1997
The class are tasked with working on an environmental project but Anita is not happy when she is paired with class clown, Drazic. Anita eventually discovers Drazic is dyslexic. Mai doesn't like being around Charlie or Ryan and after some snooping Charlie comes to the conclusion she is gay. Mel and Mai partner up on the environmental project and discover dirty run off water is killing local wildlife.
107	16	"Episode 107"	Jessica Hobbs	Greg Millin	1 April 1997	31 March – 1 April 1997
A baby is left outside the warehouse so Kat and Charlie decide to look after it but they are in over their heads. Les forces Mai to take a Geography exam after discovering she hasn't done enough subjects for her HSCs.
108	17	"Episode 108"	Malcolm McDonald	Serge Lazareff	8 April 1997	2 & 3 April 1997
Ryan's friend Warren is in town for football trials and is hitting the gym and steroids hard. Warrens temper gets the better of him when he clashes with Drazic. Kat and Charlie are having relationship problems so Kat temporarily moves out, allowing Charlie time to think about what he really wants.
109	18	"Episode 109"	Malcolm McDonald	Lisa Hoppe	15 April 1997	7 & 8 April 1997
Charlie and Kat struggle to live together after their breakup. Kat refuses to return Charlie's calculator and ignores him, talking to him only via Mai.
110	19	"Episode 110"	Andrew Prowse	Peter Kinloch	22 April 1997	9 & 10 April 1997
The class are debating sexual equality but Mai believes Ryan is a hypocrite so decided to prove her point. Drazic's bad influence is starting to affect Anita, she begins shoplifting and smoking. Les buys a new computer for the school and tasks Charlie with setting it up, however the machine is underpowered and causing issues.
111	20	"Episode 111"	Andrew Prowse	Howard Griffiths	29 April 1997	14 & 15 April 1997
Anita's court date is due and tensions are high in the Scheppers household. Anita doesn't want to be around Ryan but is desperate for Drazic to talk to her. Things are heating up between Ryan and Mai. Kat isn't happy when Charlie refuses to consider recruiting her to the inter-school quiz team.
112	21	"Episode 112"	Richard Jasek	Elizabeth Coleman	6 May 1997	16 & 17 April 1997
Kat is getting close to her dance choreographer despite Charlie's warnings. Drazic begins his community service as a lollipop man and Mel decides to give him a hard time, upsetting Anita in the process. Ryan presumes Mai is ready to take the next step in their relationship.
113	22	"Episode 113"	Richard Jasek	Phil McAloon	13 May 1997	21 & 22 April 1997
Drazic begins community service as a lifeguard. When a job opens up at the Shark Pool Mai and Anita are both hired but only one role is available. There's trouble in paradise with Ryan and Mai, Mel takes advantage of the situation but discovers Ryan wants something totally different out of their new relationship.
114	23	"Episode 114"	Jessica Hobbs	David Phillips	20 May 1997	23 & 24 April 1997
A new teacher starts at Hartley and his daughter has enrolled in class. Mel reinvents herself and brings a wild new attitude, however she's also attracting attention from the wrong people. Anita and Mai start to bond when they're forced to queue together to secure tickets to see one of their favourite bands.
115	24	"Episode 115"	Jessica Hobbs	Greg Millin	27 May 1997	28 & 29 April 1997
Anita, Ryan and Mai are off to a gig so Charlie lends them his car. When Ryan crashes Anita is left in a coma after having not worn a seatbelt. Charlie is officially moving on from Kat and invites Aurora over to give him a massage.
116	25	"Episode 116"	Andrew Prowse	Serge Lazareff	3 June 1997	30 April – 1 May 1997
Les has decided the computer room is off limits to students outside of school hours so that he can teach adults. Things get worse for the students when they are told they are not allowed to play basketball after school due to the noise while Les is teaching. Drazic is trying to muscle his way into the warehouse, much to the annoyance of Charlie. Ronnie covers Les's back by hiding the fact the students are on strike, leading to Les being promoted to permanent principal.
117	26	"Episode 117"	Andrew Prowse	Kevin Roberts	8 July 1997	5 & 6 May 1997
With Drazic forcing Charlie out of the warehouse Charlie stays at Ryan's, however the two join forces when they try to take down a school thief. Mel's dad has signed her up for a 6 month exchange program to France but she's not happy.
118	27	"Episode 118"	Lynn Hegarty	Chris Roache	15 July 1997	7 & 8 May 1997
Ronnie asks the class to discuss the unrealistic depiction of women in magazines. This leads to Anita feeling self conscious about her weight and becoming bulimic. Drazic meanwhile is berating Ox for his weight issues so Kat decides to put him on a health plan, eating better and going for runs. Ryan saves money to treat Mai to a special night.
119	28	"Episode 119"	Lynn Hegarty	Kris Wyld	22 July 1997	12 & 13 May 1997
Muslim student Omar transfers to Hartley and immediately clashes with Ronnie over his religious beliefs. Ryan is avoiding Mai after their breakup. Drazic takes up guitar but Kat is sick of hearing him playing it around the warehouse.
120	29	"Episode 120"	Richard Jasek	Peter Kinloch	19 August 1997	14 & 15 May 1997
Kat invests in a new business opportunity but struggles to get the money together. Charlie's interest in Anita is growing but when she admits she sees him as a brother complications arise. Draz and Mai are in detention and decide to intervene with a rats destiny.
121	30	"Episode 121"	Richard Jasek	Lisa Hoppe	26 August 1997	19 & 20 May 1997
Mai and Kat are selected to take part in work experience at a gallery. Despite it being a dream opportunity for Mai she doesn't make the impression she hoped she would. Anita takes issue with her mums new boyfriend. Drazic, Ryan and Barry are given a logic problem to solve but don't see eye to eye.
122	31	"Episode 122"	Geoffrey Bennett	David Phillips	2 September 1997	21 & 22 May 1997
Mai and Kat are out to convince Les that they need a common room. Drazic is spotted by a marketing agent who's interested in his roller blading skills so he tries out for the team she's putting together. Mel is back in town and staying at the Scheppers house, however Ryan isn't happy as he thinks she still has a crush on him.
123	32	"Episode 123"	Geoffrey Bennett	Howard Griffiths	9 September 1997	26 & 27 May 1997
Mel discover a homeless woman has set up shelter around the school grounds and decides to befriend her. Drazic is finding it difficult to adjust to his new career. Kat wins a TV in a raffle but the winning ticket was bought by Charlie.
124	33	"Episode 124"	Jessica Hobbs	Sally Webb	16 September 1997	28 & 29 May 1997
Charlie's car is out of action and he has nowhere to park it so Drazic helps him fix it, much to Anita's annoyance. Ronnie is mugged on the way to school so decides to organise self defence lessons for the class. Ryan almost gets run over when not using the road crossing. In an effort to improve safety Les tries to get a crossing installed closer to the school.
125	34	"Episode 125"	Jessica Hobbs	Kevin Roberts	30 September 1997	2 & 3 June 1997
The class are taking part in a 40 hour famine to raise money but Kat is struggling to get through it. Ryan starts a job waiting in a restaurant but his employer has taken an interest in more than just his work. Drazic and Anita are back on but Charlie hasn't been told.
126	35	"Episode 126"	Catherine Millar	Greg Millin	7 October 1997	4 & 5 June 1997
Hilary makes it clear she's not happy about Drazic being back on the scene. Mai and Kat are working together to produce a piece of performance art. Charlie decides to leave the Scheppers household but has nowhere to go so sleeps at school.
127	36	"Episode 127"	Catherine Millar	Phil McAloon	14 October 1997	9 & 10 June 1997
Drazic and Anita are already having problems, his jokes are getting out of hand and he decides to ridicule somebody with a disability. To make it up to Anita Drazic decides to experience life as a blind person. With nowhere to live Charlie is staying with Mel, however their friendship quickly escalates. Kat and Ryan are in a war of photos but Ryan has the upper hand.
128	37	"Episode 128"	Nico Lathouris	Serge Lazareff	21 October 1997	11 & 12 June 1997
A new teacher, Tom starts at Hartley and begins preparing the students for their HSCs. Tom is tough on Kat, leading her to loathe his lessons. When Ryan comes to Kats defence Tom makes a big mistake. Mai meets a skater she takes a keen interest in so she asks Drazic for help learning to blade, however she discovers she has little in common with her new interest, “The Wizard”.
129	38	"Episode 129"	Andrew Prowse	Peter Kinloch	28 October 1997	16 & 17 June 1997
Les recruits Charlie as his golf caddy for a big game he has coming up. The stakes are high when a bet is placed but Les is not exactly happy when Charlie becomes his moral compass. Anita and Drazic are looking for an apartment of their own but Anita discovers that Drazic is earning money by helping Leo with some shady business.
130	39	"Episode 130"	Andrew Prowse	David Phillips	4 November 1997	18 & 19 June 1997
Kat confesses to Charlie that she is still in love with him, however he is not very receptive to the idea of them getting back together. Kat decides to leave for Perth while Charlie realises he does still need her. The school is on its last legs, the roof is falling down and the class rooms are in disrepair. Les has plans in place for major renovation work but the decision is final, Hartley High will be closed for good. Anita and Mai are trying to raise money for a holiday but the job they take on quickly becomes degrading.

=== Series 6 (1997–98) ===
No. overall	No. in season	Title	Directed by	Written by	UK air date	Australia air date
131	1	"Episode 131"	Geoffrey Bennett	Peter Kinloch	11 November 1997	23 & 24 June 1997
Drazic, Ryan, Anita, Melanie and Mai transfer to Hartley Heights to finish their HSC year and are immediately outcasts. Principal Di Barnett clashes with Les, who is now the school's science teacher. Ryan fights with Kurt, the school jock, over Nikki, a singer who he meets busking on the street. Fleur Beaupert (Nikki), Jeremy Lindsay Taylor (Kurt) and Andrea Moor (Di Barnett) are added to the opening credits, replacing departing cast members Ada Nicodemou (Katerina), Sebastian Goldspink (Charlie) and Deni Gordon (Ronnie).
132	2	"Episode 132"	Geoffrey Bennett	Serge Lazareff	18 November 1997	25 & 26 June 1997
With Leo disappearing Mel's dad now owns the Shark Pool and wants to give it a face lift. Kurt's dad is recruited as a coach for the school touch football team, however his drinking problem is putting a lot of pressure on Kurt. Anita is going to be used on promotional materials to promote women in science, the problem is she wants to drop out of science class.
133	3	"Episode 133"	Lynn Hegarty	Sally Webb	25 November 1997	30 June – 1 July 1997
New Humanities teacher Mr Albers starts at Hartley. He offers English lessons to some of the foreign students, Drazic takes exception to this. Hilary is offered a job in Melbourne but she has doubts about moving away and leaving Ryan and Anita in the house alone. Her worries are exacerbated when Ryan gets into a fight and is brought home by the police.
134	4	"Episode 134"	Lynn Hegarty	David Phillips	2 December 1997	2 & 3 July 1997
Barnett suspends Les from teaching when Drazic plays a prank on him with a confiscated Penthouse magazine. Furious at her over reaction, he quits. Mai and Drazic are evicted from the warehouse and while they wait for a new place, move into the Scheppers home. Nikki invites Kurt to an industry party, and gets angry when he makes a scene in front of a record company executive. Frederick Miragliotta (Albers) is added to the opening credits, replacing departing cast member Tina Bursill (Hilary).
135	5	"Episode 135"	Malcolm McDonald	Lisa Hoppe	9 December 1997	7 & 8 July 1997
Anita and Ryan's dad arrives from Newcastle to look after them with Hilary away. Disabled student Andrew (David Price), who has muscular dystrophy, clashes with Melanie when they are paired together by Albers. Mai and Drazic struggle to pay rent, and start stealing food from the Shark Pool. Peter Sumner (Les) is removed from the opening credits.
136	6	"Episode 136"	Malcolm McDonald	Kevin Roberts	16 December 1997	9 & 10 July 1997
Kurt and Ryan’s feud continues, and both decide to ask Nikki to be their partner in a class project. Nikki decides to ask Mai instead which leads to them collecting waste. Mel and Andrew are starting to spend a lot of time together despite Drazic ridiculing them and Mel’s dad being far from keen for the relationship to continue.
137	7	"Episode 137"	Geoffrey Bennett	Phil McAloon	6 January 1998	14 & 15 July 1997
A class exercise about Arthur Phillip hits too close to home for Kurt. Anita and Ryan are shocked when Jeff's partner Sharon arrives unexpectedly with their new baby brother, James. Drazic's old friend D'Espo (Mario Gamma) moves into the warehouse, but gets kicked out when he clashes with Mai. Rebecca Smart (Melanie) is removed from the opening credits.
138	8	"Episode 138"	Geoffrey Bennett	Keith Thompson	13 January 1998	16 & 17 July 1997
Kurt’s dad’s drinking is getting out of control which is leading to a major rift in their relationship as well as Kurt’s future and his patience at school. Anita is struggling to focus on school and her personal life due to her new baby brother crying constantly. Drazic helps but his relationship with Anita is strained as a result. Nikki is having financial problems and confides in Mai; however, the story goes public.
139	9	"Episode 139"	Karl Zwicky	Howard Griffiths	20 January 1998	21 & 22 July 1997
Anita and Ryan are taken aback when Kath Livingstone and her daughter Sarah move into the Scheppers house, having been hired by Jeff as a housekeeper. Barnett hires a security guard to search the students' bags for weapons, which backfires when he goes overboard with Drazic over a water pistol. Kurt and Nikki start dating, and he takes her to the local aquarium. Nathalie Roy (Sarah) and Elaine Hudson (Kath) are added to the opening credits.
140	10	"Episode 140"	Karl Zwicky	Peter Kinloch	27 January 1998	23 & 24 July 1997
Anita is trying to form a friendship with Sarah, but Drazic and Sarah’s mother don’t seem so happy about it. Kurt and Ryan are once again competing for Nikki’s attention, but Nikki makes it clear to Ryan that she’s now in a relationship with Kurt. Ryan tries to help Nikki’s career progression but the plan backfires. Asian student Stanley is pursuing Mai, but she has no time for him and is under the impression Stanley wants to date her, however the real reason is far more serious.
141	11	"Episode 141"	Jessica Hobbs	Tim Gooding	10 February 1998	28 & 29 July 1997
Kurt and Ryan continue their feud, this time arguing over how best to train for the touch rugby tournament. Kurt’s dad continues to let the team down, leading to massive frustration on Kurt’s part. Sarah and Anita are spending a lot of time together and once again Drazic and Kath are not keen on their newfound friendship when they spend all their time on the internet, chatting to strangers online. Drazic, not immune to the allure of the internet also tries to start a business importing CDs.
142	12	"Episode 142"	Jessica Hobbs	Chris Roache	17 February 1998	30 & 31 July 1997
Mai asks the school to contribute to her phone bill so she can donate her time to helping people in times of crisis. Dennis follows in Ryan’s footsteps and becomes the second person to quit the touch football team now that Kurt is coaching. Anita sets up a dating profile for Kath but has second thoughts about sending it, however Drazic decides to get involved. Ryan is struggling to accept Nikki is with Kurt and takes his frustrations out on the field.
143	13	"Episode 143"	Andrew Prowse	David Phillips	24 February 1998	4 & 5 August 1997
Kurt is back home but Ryan is struggling with what he’s done, and his classmates are giving him the cold shoulder. The students are reading “How does your garden grow”, which Kath takes exception to and decides to pull Sarah out of the class.
144	14	"Episode 144"	Andrew Prowse	Lisa Hoppe	8 March 1998	6 & 7 August 1997
Ryan is off school sick; however, it turns out he’s developed a drug habit and is trying to gather enough cash for his next hit. Sarah and Mai team up for their history project which leads to Sarah discovering some truths about her absent father. Nikki asks Barnett to make the students enrol in a first aid course as an extracurricular activity, however most of the class are tricked into enrolling after believing the female recruiter will be their teacher.
145	15	"Episode 145"	Malcolm McDonald	Sally Webb	10 March 1998	11 & 12 August 1997
Nikki auditions on live radio and is soon offered a recording contract, however Mai discovers Nikki is being taken advantage of. Ryan quits Hartley and starts dealing drugs to make money but is quickly discovered and kicked out of the Shark Pool. When he decides dealing is not for him Mario turns out to be less than friendly. Kath won’t let Sarah grow up and insists she starts attending a youth group or church.
146	16	"Episode 146"	Malcolm McDonald	Kevin Roberts	17 March 1998	13 & 14 August 1997
Anita is helping Sarah track down her dad, but Kath isn’t happy and refuses to help. When Sarah finally discovers the truth, she loses all respect for her mother. Ryan is back as school, but his classmates aren’t happy with him. To occupy his mind Albers suggests Ryan helps him renovate the tennis court. The Shark Pool is robbed, and Mai is not taking it well but Drazic is on hand to look after her, however she reveals she has feelings for him.
147	17	"Episode 147"	Karl Zwicky	Johanna Pigott	31 March 1998	18 & 19 August 1997
Nikki is spending less time with Kurt now that she’s found a music producer, however Ryan is trying to earn her not to let the producer take advantage of her. Mai is hounding Drazic after their recent one-night stand; however, Drazic isn’t interested and doesn’t want Anita to find out what happened. Sarah slaps principal Barnett then tries to hand herself into the police for assault.
148	18	"Episode 148"	Karl Zwicky	Keith Thompson	7 April 1998	20 & 21 August 1997
Mai confides in Kurt about sleeping with Drazic, however she can’t take much more and confesses to Anita. Ryan is helping at a retirement home and bonds with a man over music. All is not well though and Ryan quickly realises his friend is being taken advantage of. Sarah and Principal Barnett are not getting along after the assault, but Sarah insists Barnett is picking on her.
149	19	"Episode 149"	Richard Jasek	Chris Phillips	14 April 1998	25 & 26 August 1997
Kurt and Nikki are tasked with looking after a pretend baby for two days, giving them an excuse to spend a few nights together. Nikki starts to realise Kurt isn’t ready for adulthood. A school grounds contractor is flirting with Sarah, however he’s also a prisoner on day release. When Kath finds out about the relationship it puts yet more strain on their already poor relationship.
150	20	"Episode 150"	Richard Jasek	Serge Lazareff	21 April 1998	27 & 28 August 1997
Kurt and Nikki are working on their relationship, but they aren’t having much luck when they go out for a meal, but a lobster sets them off on a path to do something good, although Drazic hasn’t got the message. Sarah and Kath continue to feud over her new relationship; however, this time Anita thinks Kath is right but insists she should let Sarah make her own mistakes. Sarah’s relationship ends abruptly and when Kath announces she is leaving for the countryside Sarah decides to join her.
151	21	"Episode 151"	Steve Mann	Peter Kinloch	5 May 1998	1 & 2 July 1998
Kurt has reconnected with an old friend who offers to train him, however his friends views on the homeless and weak don’t sit well with him. D’espo buys the Shark Pool but Drazic still isn’t happy with him after pawning his stereo. Drazic quickly realises D’espo doesn’t have a clue how to run a business and tries to cut corners, costing the place most of its customers. Nikki is getting fed up with a lack of money and recognition of her music, so Ryan offers to help her make a music video, but they need to raise money first. Mario Gamma (D'Espo) is added to the opening credits, replacing departing cast members Nathalie Roy (Sarah) and Elaine Hudson (Kath).
152	22	"Episode 152"	Steve Mann	David Phillips	12 May 1998	6 & 7 July 1998
Kurt continues his training with Lachlan; however, he can’t take much more when Lachlan starts to assault the homeless. Albers has had a job offer but he’s hesitating, while Nikki’s music video has caught the attention of a record label, however it’s Mai they are interested in. Albers and Mai talk things through, and both decide to pluck up the courage to leave Hartley to pursue their careers. D’espo’s latest scheme to raise money doesn’t sit well with Drazic, meanwhile D’espo’s girlfriend continue to flirt with Drazic and Ryan.
153	23	"Episode 153"	Karl Zwicky	Lisa Hoppe	26 May 1998	8 & 9 July 1998
Lee starts school at Hartley; however, his dad is also starting a job, replacing Albers. Lee doesn’t want the other students to find out his dad is their teacher. Things get worse when Lee starts trying to impress Dennis and Drazic just to fit in. Ryan is fed up with taking orders from Drazic at the Shark Pool so D’espo tries to sweet talk him with a promotion, however the extra responsibilities are not exactly what he has in mind. Kurt buys Nikki a ring and cooks her a fancy meal only to be hit with the news that Nikki wants to split up with him. Kurt turns to the bottle to comfort himself. Nathalie Roy (Sarah) returns to the opening credits, along with Marcel Bracks (Lee), Morna Seres (Jill) and John Walton (Nat), replacing departing cast members Frederick Miragliotta (Albers) and Nina Liu (Mai).
154	24	"Episode 154"	Karl Zwicky	Howard Griffiths	2 June 1998	13 & 14 July 1998
Sarah has returned to Hartley and she’s now living alone and not enjoying her new place. There’s domestic abuse going on and Ryan steps in to try to help the situation. Lee continues to try to win friends over, this time by lying to Nikki and Anita. Drazic and Kurt are on the dating scene together, however when they both try to win over the same girl, she foils their plans.
155	25	"Episode 155"	Jessica Hobbs	Sally Webb	16 June 1998	15 & 16 July 1998
Kurt is training Anita, but she thinks he’s pushing her too hard and when a fellow athlete, Paul, steps in things get heated until Kurt accepts him as a new friend. Lee is still having trouble fitting in and when the class are asked to do an anonymous IQ test, he finds the results and decides to reveal to the class how well Drazic did. Drazic has taken an interest in industrial design so asks Barnett what subjects he should study to achieve his career aspirations. When Barnett discovers Drazic’s low IQ score, she shatters his dreams.
156	26	"Episode 156"	Jessica Hobbs	Kevin Roberts	7 July 1998	20 & 21 July 1998
Kurt is spending more time training with Paul; however, Anita makes a move on Paul and discovers he is gay. Kurt doesn’t take the news of Paul’s sexuality very well. Nikki asks Barnett to only serve health food in the school canteen. Using this as a business opportunity D’espo and Drazic start selling food to the students, much to the annoyance of Nikki and Barnett. Sarah has a crush on Ryan and so when the class are asked to write letters for a project she writes love letter with him in mind, however Lee decides to post the letter in Ryan’s locker.
157	27	"Episode 157"	Ian Watson	Johanna Pigott	14 July 1998	22 & 23 July 1998
Ryan has tickets to go clubbing with Sarah but she’s hesitant as she can’t dance. D’espo offers to teach Sarah how to dance but Ryan unexpectedly walks in on them and gets the wrong idea. Nat’s old friend and fellow teacher, Gregory, is in town and is giving Lee a hard time and comparing him to his dead brother. Lee starts taking parts off Gregory’s car and tricking him into thinking they are being sold on the black market, roping in Drazic in the scheme.
158	28	"Episode 158"	Ian Watson	Serge Lazareff	21 July 1998	27 & 28 July 1998
Nat asks Lee to make his decision on which school he wants to transfer to, however Lee has other ideas and decides to drop out of school. Meanwhile Nat is constantly comparing him to his dead brother, leading to massive tension and Lee deciding to leave home. With the added stress Nat is finding balancing work and home life difficult, leading him to clash with Drazic and Dennis. The class are asked to invest pretend money on the stock market. Nikki and Ryan have very different strategies. Dennis is trying to sell his bike, with Nikki wanting to take it off his hands. Kurt and Anita begin dating and David isn’t taking it well, especially with Kurt being his roommate.
159	29	"Episode 159"	Paul Faint	Peter Kinloch	4 August 1998	29 & 30 July 1998
160	30	"Episode 160"	Paul Faint	Chris Phillips	25 August 1998	3 & 4 August 1998
161	31	"Episode 161"	Jessica Hobbs	David Phillips	1 September 1998	5 & 6 August 1998
162	32	"Episode 162"	Jessica Hobbs	Howard Griffiths	8 September 1998	10 & 11 August 1998
163	33	"Episode 163"	Ian Watson	Sally Webb	29 September 1998	12 & 13 August 1998
164	34	"Episode 164"	Ian Watson	Kevin Roberts	6 October 1998	17 & 18 August 1998
165	35	"Episode 165"	Lynn Hegarty	Johanna Pigott	13 October 1998	19 & 20 August 1998
166	36	"Episode 166"	Lynn Hegarty	Serge Lazareff	3 November 1998	24 & 25 August 1998
167	37	"Episode 167"	Paul Faint	Chris Roache	10 November 1998	26 & 27 August 1998
168	38	"Episode 168"	Paul Faint	Craig Wilkins	17 November 1998	31 August – 1 September 1998
169	39	"Episode 169"	Jessica Hobbs	David Phillips	24 November 1998	2 & 3 September 1998
170	40	"Episode 170"	Jessica Hobbs	Alan Love	1 December 1998	7 & 8 September 1998
When his parents forget his 18th birthday, Kurt goes off the rails and punches Nat during an argument. Barnett suspends him. Jill frustrates Lee by constantly buying him unfashionable clothes. Ryan and Drazic become overly dependent on a dice to make decisions. Putu Winchester (Dennis) is added to the opening credits, replacing departing cast member Fleur Beaupert (Nikki).

=== Series 7 (1998–99) ===
No. overall	No. in season	Title	Directed by	Written by	UK air date	Australia air date
171	1	"Episode 171"	Steve Mann	Kevin Roberts	8 December 1998	15 & 19 July 1999
172	2	"Episode 172"	Steve Mann	Johanna Pigott	15 December 1998	20 & 21 July 1999
173	3	"Episode 173"	Jessica Hobbs	Serge Lazareff	5 January 1999	25 & 26 July 1999
174	4	"Episode 174"	Jessica Hobbs	Peter Kinloch	12 January 1999	27 & 28 July 1999
175	5	"Episode 175"	Ian Watson	David Phillips	19 January 1999	1 & 2 August 1999
New student Thania offends Sarah with her sacrilegious artwork. Lee plots with Dennis to get tickets to the Tommy Emmanuel show. Drazic is injured when a basketball hoop falls on him, and tries to take advantage of the situation. Tasneem Roc (Thania) is added to the opening credits, replacing departing cast member Mario Gamma (D'Espo).
176	6	"Episode 176"	Ian Watson	Leon Saunders	26 January 1999	3 & 4 August 1999
177	7	"Episode 177"	Steve Mann	Sally Webb	2 February 1999	8 & 9 August 1999
178	8	"Episode 178"	Steve Mann	Chris Roache	16 February 1999	10 & 11 August 1999
179	9	"Episode 179"	Julian McSwiney	Kevin Roberts	23 February 1999	12 & 16 August 1999
180	10	"Episode 180"	Julian McSwiney	Peter Kinloch	2 March 1999	17 & 18 August 1999
181	11	"Episode 181"	Jessica Hobbs	Susan MacGillycuddy	9 March 1999	22 & 23 August 1999
182	12	"Episode 182"	Jessica Hobbs	Susan MacGillycuddy	16 March 1999	24 & 25 August 1999
183	13	"Episode 183"	Chris Martin-Jones	David Phillips	23 March 1999	26 & 30 August 1999
184	14	"Episode 184"	Chris Martin-Jones	Sally Webb	30 March 1999	31 August – 1 September 1999
185	15	"Episode 185"	Mandy Smith	Chris Roache	6 April 1999	2 & 6 September 1999
186	16	"Episode 186"	Mandy Smith	Kevin Roberts	13 April 1999	7 & 8 September 1999
The class get their HSC results, Ryan, Sarah and Kurt pass their exams and leave Hartley for better opportunities. Di Barnett also gets a new job at a bigger school. Drazic, Dennis and Lee fail their exams, and Anita doesn't get enough marks to get into her fashion course, so they decide to repeat the year. Lee is hesitant at first until he meets delivery girl Gem, a new student at Hartley. Bianca Nacson (Gemma) is added to the opening credits, replacing departing cast member John Walton (Nat).
187	17	"Episode 187"	Jessica Hobbs	Peter Kinloch	27 April 1999	9 & 13 September 1999
A new school year starts, with new principal Alan Carson enforcing old-fashioned rules onto the student body. The new science teacher Jackie Kassis thinks she has too many students and forces Thania and new student Zac to compete for a place in the class. D'Espo fires Drazic after he asks for a pay rise, and gets the attention of a camera crew when he applies for unemployment. Luke Jacobz (Zac), Elena Carapetis (Jackie) and John Gregg (Carson) are added to the opening credits, replacing departing cast members Rel Hunt (Ryan), Jeremy Lindsay Taylor (Kurt), Nathalie Roy (Sarah) and Andrea Moor (Di Barnett).
188	18	"Episode 188"	Jessica Hobbs	Peter Neale	4 May 1999	14 & 15 September 1999
189	19	"Episode 189"	Karl Zwicky	Serge Lazareff	11 May 1999	16 & 20 September 1999
190	20	"Episode 190"	Karl Zwicky	Johanna Pigott	18 May 1999	21 & 22 September 1999
191	21	"Episode 191"	Lynn Hegarty	Dave Worthington	1 June 1999	26 & 27 September 1999
Gemma flakes on a date with Lee, to stay home and cook dinner for her disabled sister Carly (Rose Byrne). New student Marco gets into a feud with Dennis when he wants to play soccer on the basketball court. Anita grows tired of Drazic's immaturity, and starts attending self-defence classes with Todd (Dominic Purcell). Danny Raco (Marco) is added to the opening credits.
192	22	"Episode 192"	Lynn Hegarty	David Phillips	15 June 1999	28 & 29 September 1999
193	23	"Episode 193"	Dan Burstall	Sally Webb	6 July 1999	30 September – 4 October 1999
194	24	"Episode 194"	Dan Burstall	Kevin Roberts	13 July 1999	5 & 6 October 1999
Lee and Zac enter Lee's song into a competition, with Gemma as the vocalist. Thania buys Drazic a piglet to cheer him up after his break-up with Anita. Sophie starts starving herself when she notices Dennis looking at other girls. Marco starts dating Angie again, but lies about being born in Italy. Lara Cox (Anita) is removed from the opening credits.
195	25	"Episode 195"	Rowan Woods	Howard Griffiths	20 July 1999	7 & 10 October 1999
196	26	"Episode 196"	Rowan Woods	Peter Neale	27 July 1999	12 & 13 October 1999
197	27	"Episode 197"	Mandy Smith	Peter Kinloch	3 August 1999	14 & 18 October 1999
198	28	"Episode 198"	Mandy Smith	Chris Roache	10 August 1999	19 & 20 October 1999
199	29	"Episode 199"	Dan Burstall	Serge Lazareff	17 August 1999	21 & 25 October 1999
200	30	"Episode 200"	Dan Burstall	David Phillips	31 August 1999	26 & 27 October 1999
Zac and Thania organise a party after learning that Drazic's probation period is about to end. Thania pushes Marco away after doing a compatibility test. Lee has a meltdown after falling behind on schoolwork, and Jill decides they need a fresh start at a new school. Katherine Hicks (Tess) and Mark Owen-Taylor (Tim) are added to the opening credits, replacing departing cast members Marcel Bracks (Lee) and Morna Seres (Jill).
201	31	"Episode 201"	Ian Watson	Sally Webb	7 September 1999	28 October – 1 November 1999
202	32	"Episode 202"	Ian Watson	Kevin Roberts	14 September 1999	2 & 3 November 1999
203	33	"Episode 203"	Chris Martin-Jones	Jenny Nicholson	21 September 1999	4 & 8 November 1999
204	34	"Episode 204"	Chris Martin-Jones	Euan Upston	28 September 1999	9 & 10 November 1999
Drazic is harassed by a loan shark Louie (Nicholas Bishop), who claims his dad owed him $60,000. Tim forces Dennis to accompany Tess to a rock gig. Carson plays a trick on his class to teach them about propaganda. Lara Cox (Anita) returns to the opening credits.
205	35	"Episode 205"	Mandy Smith	Peter Kinloch	5 October 1999	11 & 15 November 1999
206	36	"Episode 206"	Mandy Smith	Serge Lazareff	12 October 1999	16 & 17 November 1999
207	37	"Episode 207"	Ian Watson	David Phillips	19 October 1999	18 & 22 November 1999
208	38	"Episode 208"	Ian Watson	Kevin Roberts	26 October 1999	23 & 24 November 1999
209	39	"Episode 209"	Steve Mann	Peter Neale	2 November 1999	25 & 29 November 1999
210	40	"Episode 210"	Steve Mann	Chris Roache	9 November 1999	30 November – 1 December 1999 (Australia)
