= 1993 Australian Film Institute Awards =

Australian film and TV awards ceremony

35th Australian Film Institute Awards
- Date: 5 November 1993

Highlights
- Best Film: The Piano
- Most awards: Film: The Piano (11); TV: The Leaving of Liverpool, G.P. (2)
- Most nominations: Film: The Piano (13); TV: Police Rescue (5)

Television coverage
- Network: ABC

The 35th Australian Film Institute Awards (generally known as the AFI Awards) were held on 5 November 1993. Presented by the Australian Film Institute (AFI), the awards celebrated the best in Australian feature film, documentary, short film and television productions of 1993.

Eighteen feature films were nominated. Jane Campion's The Piano dominated the feature film awards with eleven awards including Best Film. Blackfellas won two awards for adapted screenplay and actor in a supporting role, and On My Own received a single award for actress in a supporting role. Television awards were shared between various productions such as miniseries The Leaving of Liverpool and drama series Phoenix and G.P.. Producer Sue Milliken received the Raymond Longford Award for lifetime achievement.

== Winners and nominees ==
Winners are listed first and highlighted in boldface.

=== Feature film ===
Best Film	Best Achievement in Direction
**The Piano – Jan Chapman**; Map of the Human Heart – Tim Bevan, Vincent Ward, Timothy White; On My Own – Leo Pescarolo, Will Spencer, Rosa Colosimo, Elisa Resegotti, Lael McCall, Stavros Stavrides; The Heartbreak Kid – Ben Gannon	**Jane Campion – The Piano**; James Ricketson – Blackfellas; Vincent Ward – Map of the Human Heart; Michael Jenkins – The Heartbreak Kid
Best Performance by an Actor in a Leading Role	Best Performance by an Actress in a Leading Role
**Harvey Keitel – The Piano**; John Moore – Blackfellas; Matthew Ferguson – On My Own; Anthony LaPaglia – The Custodian	**Holly Hunter – The Piano**; Claudia Karvan – Broken Highway; Fiona Ruttelle – Say A Little Prayer; Jacqueline McKenzie – This Won't Hurt A Bit!
Best Performance by an Actor in a Supporting Role	Best Performance by an Actress in a Supporting Role
**David Ngoombujarra – Blackfellas**; Barry Otto – The Custodian; Nico Lathouris – The Heartbreak Kid; Sam Neill – The Piano	**Judy Davis – On My Own**; Kris McQuade – Broken Highway; Jill Forster – Say a Little Prayer; Kerry Walker – The Piano
Best Original Screenplay	Best Screenplay Adapted from Another Source
**Jane Campion – The Piano**; Bob Ellis – The Nostradamus Kid; Gill Dennis, Antonio Tibaldi, John Frizzell – On My Own; Chris Kennedy – This Won't Hurt A Bit!	**James Ricketson – Blackfellas**; Kevin Lucas – Black River; David Holman – No Worries; John Tatoulis, Jon Stephens – The Silver Brumby
Best Achievement in Cinematography	Best Achievement in Editing
**Stuart Dryburgh – The Piano**; Steve Mason – Broken Highway; Eduardo Serra – Map of the Human Heart; Stephen F. Windon – No Worries; Vic Sarin – On My Own	**Veronika Jenet – The Piano**; John Scott, George Akers – Map of the Human Heart; Stewart Young – Resistance; Michael Honey – The Custodian
Best Achievement in Sound	Best Original Music Score
**Lee Smith, Tony Johnson, Gethin Creagh, Peter Townend, Annabelle Sheehan – The Piano**; Penn Robinson, Jeanine Chialvo, Paul Brincat – Broken Highway; Andrew Plain, Gethin Creagh – Map of the Human Heart; John Dennison, Tony Vaccher, John Patterson, Ross Linton, Nick Holmes – Shotgun Wedding	**Michael Nyman – The Piano**; Gabriel Yared – Map of the Human Heart; Anthony Marinelli, Billy Childs – My Forgotten Man; Franco Piersanti – On My Own
Best Achievement in Production Design	Best Achievement in Costume Design
**Andrew McAlpine – The Piano**; Lesley Crawford – Broken Highway; MacGregor Knox – Resistance; Chris Kennedy – Say a Little Prayer	**Janet Patterson – The Piano**; Fiona Spence – Frauds; Aphrodite Kondos – Gross Misconduct; Lynn-Maree Milburn, Jacqui Everitt – Say a Little Prayer; Roger Ford – The Nostradamus Kid

=== Television ===
Best Episode in a Television Drama Series	Best Television Mini-Series or Telefeature
**Phoenix, Season 2 – Episode 11, 'Under Siege' (ABC) – Bill Hughes**; Police Rescue, Series 3 – Episode 10, 'Whirlwind' (ABC) – Sandra Levy, John Edwards; G.P., Series 5 – Episode 20, 'Exposed' (ABC) – Bruce Best; Police Rescue, Series 3 – Episode 1, 'Lifeline' (ABC) – Sandra Levy, John Edwards	**The Leaving of Liverpool (ABC) – Steve Knapman**; Seven Deadly Sins – 'Sloth' (ABC) – Bob Weis; Joh's Jury (ABC) – Rod Allan; Stark (ABC) – Michael Wearing, David Parker, Timothy White
Best Episode in a Television Drama Serial	Best Children's Television Drama
**Home and Away – Episode 1222 (Seven Network) – Andrew Howie**; Home and Away – Episode 1252 (Seven Network) – Andrew Howie; Neighbours – Episode 1859 (Network Ten) – Margaret Slarke, Sally-Anne Kerr; Home and Away – Episode 1251 (Seven Network) – Andrew Howie	**Round the Twist, Series 2 – Episode 3, 'Little Squirt' (ABC) – Patricia Edgar, Antonia Barnard**; Halfway Across the Galaxy and Turn Left – Episode 19, 'Welcome To The Human Race' (Nine Network) – Jan Marnell; Under the Skin – Episode 12, 'The Blanket Of Love' (SBS) – Franco di Chiera; Mission Top Secret, Series 1 – Episodes 17-20, 'Polish Pony Puzzle' (Network Ten) – Noel Price
Best Performance by an Actor in a Leading Role in a Television Drama	Best Performance by an Actress in a Leading Role in a Television Drama
**Peter Phelps – G.P., Series 5 – Episode 20, 'Exposed' (ABC)**; Malcolm Kennard – Joh's Jury (ABC); Jeremy Callaghan – Police Rescue, Series 3 – Episode 10, 'Whirlwind' (ABC); John Howard – Joh's Jury (ABC)	**Denise Roberts – G.P., Series 5 – 'Alone' (ABC)**; Elaine Hudson – Joh's Jury (ABC); Christine Tremarco – The Leaving of Liverpool (ABC); Elizabeth Alexander – Seven Deadly Sins – 'Pride' (ABC)
Best Achievement in Direction in a Television Drama	Best Screenplay in a Television Drama
**Michael Carson – Police Rescue, Series 3 – Episode 10, 'Whirlwind' (ABC)**; Kate Woods – Phoenix, Season 2 – Episode 11, 'Under Siege' (ABC); Michael Jennings – The Leaving of Liverpool (ABC); Paul Moloney – Halfway Across the Galaxy and Turn Left – Episode 19, 'Welcome To The Human Race' (Nine Network)	**Sue Smith, John Alsop – The Leaving of Liverpool (ABC)**; Hannie Rayson – Seven Deadly Sins – 'Sloth' (ABC); Paul Jennings, Esben Storm – Round the Twist, Series 2 – Episode 3, 'Little Squirt' (ABC); Debra Oswald – Police Rescue, Series 3 – Episode 1, 'Lifeline' (ABC)
Best Television Documentary
**Who Killed Malcolm Smith? (ABC) – Nicholas Adler, Caroline Sherwood**; Wolves of the Sea (ABC) – David Parer, Elizabeth Parer-Cook; The Last Man Hanged (ABC) – Bill Bennett; The Burning Piano: A Portrait of Patrick White (ABC) – Christopher McCullough

=== Non-feature film ===
Best Documentary	Best Short Fiction Film
**Exile And The Kingdom – Frank Rijavec (director)**; **For All The World To See – Pat Fiske (director)**; Homelands – Tom Zubrycki (director); The Journey – Christopher Tuckfield (director)	**Mr. Electric – Stuart McDonald (director)**; Heart Of Pearl – Andrew Taylor (director); Opportunity Knocks – Mick Connolly (director); Terra Nullius – Anne Pratten (director)
Best Animation	Best Screenplay in a Short Film
**The Darra Dogs – Dennis Tupicoff (director)**; A Saucer of Water for the Birds – Ann Shenfield (director); Arnold Has a Thought – Peter McDonald (director); The Web – 'Bandicoot' – Lucinda Clutterbuck, Sarah Watt (director)	**Monica Pellizzari – Just Desserts**; Andrew Sully – Black Dogs; Stuart McDonald – Mr. Electric; Anne Pratten – Terra Nullius
Best Achievement in Cinematography in a Non-Feature Film	Best Achievement in Editing in a Non-Feature Film
**Glen Carruthers – Kangaroos – Faces in the Mob**; Susan Thwaites – Heart of Pearl; Peter Coleman – Spring Ball; Dion Beebe – The Journey	**Suresh Ayyar – Gumshoe**; Michael Balson – Everest – Sea to Summit; Anne Pratten – Range of Experience; Sean Cousins, David Rowe – The Good Son
Best Achievement in Sound in a Non-Feature Film	Outstanding Achievement in a Non-Feature Film
**Noeline Harrison, Lawrie Silverstrin, Kim Lord – Exile and the Kingdom**; Phil Winters – Opportunity Knocks; Anne McKinolty – The Resting Place; Gareth Vanderhope, Ralph Ortner – The Sleep of Reason	**Lynn-Maree Milburn (for innovation in form) – Memories and Dreams**; Michael Bates (for technical excellence) – Etcetetra in a Paper Jam; Catherine Mansell (for production design) – Heart of Pearl; John Hughes (for innovation in form) – One Way Street

=== Additional awards ===
Raymond Longford Award	Byron Kennedy Award
**Sue Milliken**	**Adrian Martin, Evanne Chesson, Gary Warner, Matt Butler**
Young Actors Award	Best Foreign Film
**Robert Joamie – Map of the Human Heart**; **Lauren Hewett – Halfway Across the Galaxy and Turn Left (Nine Network)**	**The Crying Game – Stephen Woolley**; The Player – Michael Tolkin, David Brown, Nick Wechsler; Raise the Red Lantern – Chiu Fu-sheng; Husbands and Wives – Robert Greenhut
