= The Young Wife =

The Young Wife may refer to:

- The Young Wife (TV series), 1984 Australian mini-series
- The Young Wife (film), 2023 American film
- Balika Badhu (1976 film) (English title: The Young Wife), a 1976 Indian Hindi-language drama film by Tarun Majumdar, starring Sachin Pilgaonkar
