= Heartbreak High =

Australian television series (1994–1999)

- Title card
- Genre: Soap opera Teen drama
- Created by: Michael Jenkins; Ben Gannon
- Theme music composer: Todd Hunter
- Country of origin: Australia
- Original language: English
- No. of series: 7
- No. of episodes: 210 (list of episodes)

Production
- Executive producers: Michael Jenkins; Ben Gannon
- Producer: Chris Roache
- Running time: 50 minutes
- Production company: Gannon Television

Original release
- Network: Network Ten (1994–1996); ABC TV (1997–1999)
- Release: 27 February 1994 – 29 November 1999

Related
- The Heartbreak Kid; Heartbreak High (soft-reboot/continuation 2022 TV series)

Heartbreak High is an Australian television programme created by Michael Jenkins and Ben Gannon that ran from 1994 to 1996 on Network Ten and 1997 to 1999 on ABC, for seven seasons. It was also partially funded from 1996 by BBC2, with some episodes airing in the UK ahead of their Australian release. The drama has been described as more gritty and fast-paced than many of its contemporaries, and follows the lives of students and staff at a multicultural Sydney high school.

The first five series were set at the fictional Hartley High and filmed in Maroubra Bay High School in Maroubra, New South Wales in the Eastern Suburbs of Sydney, Australia. Series six and seven were set at the fictional Hartley Heights, and filmed in Warriewood in the Northern Beaches.

The show is a spin-off of the 1993 Australian feature film The Heartbreak Kid, which also featured Alex Dimitriades, Nico Lathouris, Doris Younane, Scott Major and Katherine Halliday as early versions of their Heartbreak High characters.

In 2020, Netflix produced a reboot, created by Hannah Carroll Chapman, which first aired in September 2022 and ran for three seasons, ending in March 2026. It was filmed in South Sydney Highschool, Maroubra.

== Series synopsis ==
Heartbreak High had its origins in the 1987 stage play The Heartbreak Kid, written by Richard Barrett and starring Gia Carides and Arky Michael. The play centred on Papa, a 22-year-old Greek-Australian teacher at an inner city school, who has an affair with her student, Nicky, and explored the restrictiveness of Greek culture, as well as ethnic tensions within Australian society. The play was first performed by the Griffin Theatre Company at the Stables Theatre in Darlinghurst, New South Wales, and adapted into the 1993 film The Heartbreak Kid, directed by Michael Jenkins and filmed in the inner suburb of Prahran, Victoria. Jenkins and producer Ben Gannon developed Heartbreak High as a spin-off of the film, with several cast members reprising their roles, reimagined in a Sydney setting.

The first series, which was initially centred on the Poulos family, consisted of 38 episodes and premiered on Network Ten on 27 February 1994. A second series of 14 episodes premiered on 21 May 1995, and began following a floating timeline, with the students established as being in their last school year and preparing for the HSC, but not sitting for their exams until the beginning of series five (after enduring several cast changes and with nearly two years passing in real time). A third series of 13 episodes premiered on 20 August 1995.

The show was axed after two years on Network Ten; however 26 more episodes were subsequently produced with funding from BBC2. They aired the first thirteen episodes in the UK from 26 March 1996 to 16 June 1996, then thirteen more episodes from 3 September 1996 to 3 December 1996. Network Ten eventually aired these episodes to meet their local drama quota in a late night timeslot from 5 August 1996 to 11 November 1996, splitting the 45-minute episodes into 23-minute parts, allowing two episodes to be aired weekly across four nights (Mondays to Thursdays). Although later (and international) airings of the episodes were screened in full, the show would continue to follow this soap opera formula in Australia when it was subsequently bought and revived by the ABC.

Series five first aired on BBC2 in the UK from 10 December 1996 to 14 October 1997, and in Australia on the ABC from 3 February 1997 to 19 June 1997, a total of 39 episodes. This series had the most significant cast change, with the majority of remaining cast members being phased out of the show within the first six episodes, and the show shifting focus from the Bordino family onto the Scheppers family. A new school year begins from the eighth episode onwards and continues in a floating timeline, with students in their last school year but not sitting for their HSC exams until midway through series seven (with over two years passing in real time).

Series six marked the debut of Hartley Heights, the student's new school location. The first 20 episodes of series six aired on the ABC from 23 June to 28 August 1997. After nearly a year of repeats, 20 more episodes aired from 1 July to 8 September 1998.

The seventh and final series first aired on BBC2 in the UK from 8 December 1998 to 9 November 1999, and in Australia on the ABC from 15 July to 1 December 1999, for a total of 40 episodes. The show was eventually cancelled as selling another series to foreign TV stations proved increasingly difficult. BBC2 had no interest in buying an additional series, due to scheduling delays a backlog of episodes had built up, and the program was forced to wrap up production.

== Cast and characters ==
=== Cast timeline ===
Lighter colours denote recurring guest stars versus series regulars.

=== Network Ten years (1994–96) ===
==== Original cast members ====
- Alex Dimitriades as Nick Poulos (series 1, episodes 1–38)

A popular and athletic 17-year-old Greek-Australian student at Hartley High. He is the central character of the show's first series, which chronicles his relationship struggles with Jodie Cooper, including his family's concerns when the two start having sex, the death of his mother in a car crash, and Jodie's infidelity while she is away on tour in Melbourne. Midway through the series, he cheats on Jodie with Danielle, briefly alienating themselves from their friend group; however, their relationship fizzles out, and he and Jodie get back together. After moving in with his aunt and uncle when his father leaves for Greece, Nick recklessly pursues a boxing career, eventually dying in the ring from a brain aneurysm in episode 38.
The character is based on Nick Polides from the 1993 film The Heartbreak Kid, also played by Dimitriades, and Nicky Polidis from the 1987 play of the same name, originally played by Tony Poli. Dimitriades left Heartbreak High over a pay dispute with Network Ten. The writers wanted Nick to exit the show quietly by returning to Greece; however, the network threatened to pull the show off air if the character wasn't killed off in a dramatic fight sequence. Dimitriades later appears in an easter egg in episode 206, when his photograph is shown in a portfolio to Drazic and Marco.

- Sarah Lambert as Christina Milano (series 1, episodes 1–26)

The new English and History teacher at Hartley. Christina is 22-years-old, Italian-Australian and engaged to businessman Marco Rossi. Early into the series, she moves out of her parents’ home into an apartment with Yola, and ends her engagement to Marco. She briefly dates drama teacher Phil North, before meeting Mack Winston, a philanthropist known for his work with underprivileged children in Indonesia. In episode 26, she leaves Hartley to move away with him.
The character is partially based on Christina Papadopoulos from The Heartbreak Kid, played by Claudia Karvan, and Papa from the 1987 stage play, originally played by Gia Carides; however, the romance with Nick was dropped for this adaptation.

- Katherine Halliday as Rosette "Rose" Malouf (series 1–2, episodes 1–49)

A Lebanese-Australian student, aspiring lawyer and editor of the school newspaper. Midway through the first series, she develops a crush on her drama teacher Phil North, before becoming romantically involved with Vietnamese student Jack. Her father Frank disapproves of their relationship, and briefly kicks her out of the house when she falls pregnant with Jack's baby. Towards the end of the first series, Rose gives birth prematurely at school to a daughter, Tess. In series two, Rose briefly dates Con, before accepting Jack's marriage proposal and transferring to his school in episode 49.
Halliday previously appeared as Maria in The Heartbreak Kid.

- Salvatore Coco as Costa "Con" Bordino (series 1–4, episodes 1–71, guest star in series 5, episode 94)

Nick's cousin and best friend. Born to a Greek mother and Italian father, Con is a popular and charismatic student, usually seen driving a convertible or on his mobile phone making business deals. He becomes Jodie's manager, and early episodes of the series focus on his struggles to kickstart her music career. Later, he becomes co-owner and manager of The Shark Pool, the group's primary hangout, and hires many of his school friends to work for him. Con initially harbours a crush on Chaka, before dating Greta Stewart, an older television executive, and having a fling with Lucy's mother Jacqui. In subsequent seasons, he becomes romantically involved with Rose and Katerina. Con leaves Hartley for a student exchange program in Santa Monica, California in episode 71. He returns in episode 94, revealing that he has dropped out of school to enter the real estate business, and married Stephanie, the daughter of his American boss.
Con is based on the character of the same name from The Heartbreak Kid, played by Fonda Goniadis, and the 1987 stage play, originally played by Arky Michael.

- Emma Roche as Danielle Miller (series 1–4, episodes 1–91)

The only girl on Hartley's soccer team and Rose's best friend. She has been in a relationship with Steve for 18 months, they break up midway through the first series after she cheats on him with Nick. Her family life is the focus of several episodes, including when her 15-year-old sister gets pregnant and has to have an abortion, and her mother's brief relationship with Southgate after divorcing her father. In series three, she and Steve eventually reconcile, and she is devastated by his accidental death in series four. Danielle develops an addiction to amphetamines, and is briefly expelled from the school before breaking the habit. She then becomes romantically involved with Declan. Danielle develops a passion for journalism after taking Vic Morris' media class, and in several episodes considers leaving school to pursue a career as a television reporter. She eventually leaves Hartley in episode 91, just weeks before her HSC exams, to accept a job at a community television station in Wollongong.

- Corey Page as Steve Wiley (series 1–3, episodes 1–65)

A rugby player on Southgate's team and Danielle's boyfriend, who he breaks up with midway through the first series. When he is abandoned by his parents during their divorce, Steve discovers he's adopted, and after a brief period of homelessness, moves into the warehouse with Jodie and Rivers. Later, he begins dating Lucy, a wealthy student from another school, before reconciling with Danielle. After taking Vic Morris' media class, Steve develops an interest in photography. While taking photographs at the beach, Steve accidentally falls off a cliff and dies. His body is found by police in episode 66, devastating his friends.
Steve is based on the sole Anglo-Australian character of the same name in the 1987 stage play The Heartbreak Kid, originally played by Franco Serafin. Page left Heartbreak High to pursue his acting career in Los Angeles after it was axed by Network Ten. He was unavailable to film his final scenes when the show was picked up by BBC2, so his character is killed offscreen.

- Doris Younane as Yola Fatoush (series 1–2, episodes 1–52)

Hartley's guidance counsellor and substitute English and History teacher. Yola is 30-years-old and Lebanese-Australian, portrayed as being very modern and open-minded, easily assimilated into Australian culture. She shares Christina and Graham's progressive views, which occasionally puts them at odds with the more conservative Southgate. Early into the series, Christina moves into her apartment, and the two briefly fall out when Yola becomes involved with Marty, a married man. In series two, Yola becomes romantically involved with Senior Constable Joe Lawrence, eventually falling pregnant to him. Later, she is devastated when he is shot to death, bringing her closer to Southgate. In episode 52, Southgate offers her a position at a school in rural Yanderra, and the two are seen kissing as they drive away from Hartley.
Younane previously appeared as Evdokia in The Heartbreak Kid.

- Scott Major as Peter Rivers (series 1–3, episodes 1–65)

The troubled bad boy of Hartley. Rivers is initially portrayed as a racist and sexist bully, constantly antagonising the other students with his best friend Bolton. He endured a rough childhood and is often in trouble with the law, his mother is an alcoholic, and his father and brother are career criminals currently in prison. He grows closer to the group and shows a softer side when he begins dating Chaka, and then Katerina, and moves into the warehouse with Steve and Jodie. Later, he becomes romantically involved with English teacher Sam, and runs away with her up north in episode 65.
The character is based on John Rivers from The Heartbreak Kid, also played by Scott Major, who is also mentioned but not seen in the 1987 stage play of the same name. Major reprises his role in the 2022 reboot, where his character is the father of Darren Rivers.

- Abi Tucker as Jodie Cooper (series 1–3, episodes 1–65)

A new student at Hartley, and an aspiring singer. She is estranged from her divorced parents, and lives in an apartment with her sister Karen, before moving into the warehouse with Steve and Rivers. The first series chronicles her struggles to kick-start her music career, as well as her on-again, off-again relationship with Nick, which finally ends when he refuses to give up boxing. She is then briefly engaged to his cousin Rocco, who gets her a gig singing backup for a band about to go on tour. However, at the airport heading for America, she has second thoughts, and rushes back to Nick only to watch him die in the ring. In series two and three, she becomes romantically involved with Matt Logan, before forming a connection with Tim Beckett, a washed up singer and struggling alcoholic, who helps her secure a record deal. She leaves Hartley to pursue her career, however returns one last time in episode 65 to help save the school from closure.
While she is not seen again after series three, Jodie's songs can be heard occasionally in the background throughout series four to seven.

- Isabella Gutierrez as Chaka Cardenes (series 1, episodes 1–14)

A student from El Salvador whose mother and siblings immigrated to Australia during the Salvadoran civil war. Her father is a teacher, who was suspected of being part of her country's resistance movement, and taken away by armed forces. Early into the series, Chaka's mother leaves her alone to search for their father, and she struggles to take care of her younger siblings. Her father is eventually found alive. During the series, Chaka begins dating Rivers, however they break up in episode 14 when she moves to Darwin with her now reunited family.
A minor character called Soula, played by Chaka Johnson, appears in a similar role in The Heartbreak Kid. Gutierrez reprises her role in the 2022 reboot.

- Tai Nguyen as Jack Tran (series 1, episodes 1–26, guest star in series 1–2, episodes 37–49)

A student from Vietnam and an aspiring doctor. He is new to Hartley and initially becomes the target of racial abuse and harassment from Rivers and Bolton, however quickly befriends Nick and the other students. He becomes romantically involved with Rose, however they break up when his high grades earn him a place at a selective school in episode 22. He returns in a recurring role towards the end of the first series, and in series two, when Rose gives birth to their daughter, Tess. They eventually marry in a traditional Vietnamese wedding in episode 49.
A minor character called Tran, played by Bao Quach, appears in a similar role in The Heartbreak Kid.

- Tony Martin as Bill Southgate (series 1–2, episodes 1–52)

Science teacher and rugby coach at Hartley, and briefly the school's acting principal. He is generally unpopular with the students due to his favouritism towards the rugby players, and his conservative views often put him at odds with the other teachers. He is married to a woman named Marnie, with whom he shares a daughter, Natalie. She files for divorce early into the series. In series two, he briefly dates Danielle's mother Suzie before forming a connection with Yola after her boyfriend's death. In episode 52, he accepts an offer to become principal at a school in rural Yanderra and asks Yola to come with him. They are seen kissing as they drive away from Hartley.
The character is based on Brian Southgate in The Heartbreak Kid, played by William McInnes, and in the 1987 stage play, originally played by Arky Michael.

- Hugh Baldwin as Graham Brown (series 1, episodes 1–26, guest star in series 3–4, episodes 53, 71)

The maths and music teacher at Hartley. He is openly gay. His sexuality becomes a focal point early into the series, when he is falsely accused of touching a young male student inappropriately. While Jodie and the other students rally behind him, he considers leaving when he is harassed by Rivers and Bolton and later gay-bashed by a homophobic parent. When the student admits his father was forcing him to lie about their encounter, Graham is vindicated and remains at Hartley. Graham is not seen after episode 26 except in guest appearances in episodes 53 and 71, where he is seen in the teacher's lounge at Hartley as though he had never left. The students are instead taught Maths in Year 12 by Athol Pike.
Graham is based on the character of the same name in The Heartbreak Kid, played by Jasper Bagg, and Graham Russell from the 1987 stage play, originally played by Franco Serafin. Unlike his television counterpart, he claims to be a "happily married man" in the play, although some dialogue hints at his homosexuality.

- Stephen O'Rourke as Jim Deloraine (series 1–4, episodes 1–69)

Principal at Hartley High. He was previously married with no children, his wife Barbara died prior to the events of the show. Deloraine acts as a mediator throughout the series, trying to find common ground between Southgate and the other teachers when they are at odds, and attempting to balance the school budget with the demands of the students. In series two, his nephew Matt arrives at Hartley and moves in with him, later setting him up on a blind date with a woman named Patricia. When Hartley High is threatened with closure at the end of series three, Deloraine suffers a mild heart attack. After a second heart attack in episode 69, Deloraine takes an early retirement and is replaced by June Dyson.
An unnamed principal appears in a similar role in The Heartbreak Kid, played by Robin Cuming, and in the 1987 stage play, played by Franco Serafin.

- Jan Adele as Ruby St. John (series 1, episodes 1–26)

The owner and manager of Ruby's, a local milk bar and pool hall where the students spend most of their time after school. Ruby has no major storylines of her own and is mostly portrayed as a background extra, her most notable moment is when she beats local bully Sime in a game of pool, forcing him to pay for the students' soccer uniforms. Later, she hires Jodie to work for her as a waitress. She is not seen after episode 26, with The Shark Pool replacing Ruby's as the student's primary hangout.

- Elly Varrenti as Irini Poulos (series 1, episodes 1–8)

Nick's mother. She is a housewife who acts as a mediator whenever Nick and his father are at odds. Irini gets into a car crash on her way home from the soccer game early into the series, ultimately dying from her injuries in hospital in episode 8. Her death devastates the Poulos family.
The character is based on Nicky's mother from the 1987 stage play, originally played by Gia Carides, who, along with his father, is featured in two scenes in the play, mostly speaking in Greek and obsessed with the lotto, which they eventually win. There is no equivalent in the 1993 film adaptation, with Nick's mother having died prior to the events of the film.

- Nico Lathouris as George Poulos (series 1, episodes 1–29, guest star in episode 30)

Nick's father. He is a factory worker who immigrated to Australia from Greece, and was a famous soccer player in his home country. After his wife dies, he becomes romantically involved with his housekeeper Stella. George gets a job offer to help run an import/export business in Athens and moves back to Greece in episode 30.
The character is based on George Polides from The Heartbreak Kid, also played by Lathouris, and Nicky's father from the 1987 stage play, originally played by Arky Michael. Unlike his television counterpart, he mostly speaks in Greek and has a strong accent. Lathouris also served behind-the-scenes as the show's dramaturge until series six.

- Despina Caldis as Effie Poulos (series 1–3, episodes 1–65)

Nick's 12-year-old sister. She is in Year 6 at a Catholic primary school. When her father announces that the family will be moving to Greece, Effie runs off to live on the streets of Kings Cross and has to be rescued. George agrees to let her and Nick stay in Australia, and they move in with their aunt and uncle. During the series, she begins dating Bart, a nerdy student, and in series two, the two begin Year 7 at Hartley High. Effie disappears without explanation in episode 66 and is never mentioned again, presumably returning to live with her father in Greece.
The character is based on Effie Polides from The Heartbreak Kid, played by Jenny Anthanasopoulos. Con's ten-year old sister, originally played by Gia Carides, appears in a similar role in the 1987 stage play.

==== Series 1 additions ====
- Peta Toppano as Stella Ioannou (series 1, episodes 9–28)

A housekeeper who is hired by Helen to assist the Poulos family after Irini's death. Stella is estranged from her husband Dimitri and daughter Katerina, and quickly becomes a maternal figure to Effie and Nick. She eventually falls in love with George, before leaving for Greece in episode 28 to run her mother's dance school.

- Ada Nicodemou as Katerina Ioannou (series 1, 3–5, episodes 16–28, 54–130)

Stella's troublemaking daughter. She arrives from Greece shortly after Chaka's departure and moves herself into the Poulos home. She begins dating Rivers after enrolling at Hartley, infuriating her mother. Their relationship becomes strained when he starts pressuring her into sex, and she finally dumps him when she walks in on him kissing Danielle. Katerina leaves with her mother in episode 28, but returns in series three, where she attempts to blackmail Rivers into rekindling their relationship. She moves in with the Bordinos, eventually falling in love with Con and losing her virginity to him. When he leaves for America in series four, she takes over as manager of the Shark Pool. Later, she meets Charlie over the internet, but rejects him for being a nerd when he comes to Hartley. They eventually hook up after Matt gives him a make-over. Katerina fails her HSC exams and decides to repeat the year in series five, moving in with Charlie at the warehouse. They break up when Katerina flirts with other men, and she has brief romances with her married dance instructor Blair, and Ryan, before realising she still has feelings for Charlie. In episode 130, Katerina decides to pursue her dancing career at the performing arts school WAAPA and leaves with Charlie for Perth.

- Barbara Gouskos as Helen Bordino (series 1–5, episodes 29–96, guest star in episodes 8, 25)

Con's mother and Irini's sister, who first appears after Irini's death. She is Greek and has been married to Roberto since they were 20 years old, they also have an older son, Rocco, who lives mostly in America. She runs her own catering business. Effie and Nick move in with the Bordinos when George leaves for Greece, and throughout the series, their home becomes a refuge for characters who have nowhere else to go, such as Katerina and Matt. In episode 96, Helen and Roberto leave Australia for an extended vacation through Greece, Italy and America, and rent out their home to Katerina's aunt Magda.

- Ivar Kants as Roberto Bordino (series 1–5, episodes 29–96, guest star in episodes 25, 27)

Con's father. He is Italian and owns a construction company. He has a difficult relationship with his oldest son, Rocco, and often has to bail him out of his poor business decisions. Roberto is co-owner and primary investor of the Shark Pool, and becomes more hands-on as a manager in series four after Con leaves for America. In episode 96, he and Helen leave for a European vacation, and he unknowingly sells the Shark Pool to Leo Fine, a local gangster who has had several run ins with Roberto and Rocco in the past.
Francesco Caudullo appears as Roberto in episode 8.

- Kym Wilson as Sam Robinson (series 1 & 3, episodes 30–35, 53–65, guest star in episodes 29, 36)

The new English and History teacher, who replaces Christina. She is only a few years older than her students, and shares Rivers' passion for motorcycles. Although he comes on too strong and sexually aggressive at first, Sam eventually falls for Rivers, and is forced to quit when their relationship is exposed. Deloraine does not report Sam to the authorities, and she remains in the school system when a position opens up at Hartley upon Yola and Southgate's departures. She returns to teach in series three, refusing Rivers' advances and promising Deloraine that it won't happen again. She instead enters a relationship with the new Science teacher Andrew Bell, despite her initial disgust for his conservative views. When he proposes, Sam's feelings for Rivers resurface, and the two are caught having sex in the school's darkroom. With her future at Hartley over, Sam and Rivers run off together "up north" for a new life together in episode 65.

- Alexandra Brunning as Lucy Weston (series 1–2, episodes 36–51, guest star in episodes 30–35)

A wealthy girl from another school. She begins dating Steve after she hires Helen to cater a dinner party for her mother Jacqui's obnoxious friends, and helps him in finding his birth parents. In series two, she has a HIV scare upon learning of her ex-boyfriend Andrew's drug history, but ultimately she and Steve test negative. Later, Steve helps her break up her mother's relationship with celebrity philanthropist Jerry Shapiro, after he makes inappropriate advances towards her. In episode 51, Lucy gets accepted into a 6-month exchange program in Japan and ends her relationship with Steve.
Brunning previously appeared in episode 18 as Elvie, a Hartley student who shows an interest in Steve.

==== Series 2 additions ====
- Vince Poletto as Matt Logan (series 2–5, episodes 39–97)

Deloraine's nephew, a rebellious surfer who starts at Hartley shortly after Nick's death. Although academically gifted, he is estranged from his family and is repeating his HSC year, having been kicked out of his previous three schools for behavioural issues. In series two, he pursues Jodie, who is still grieving Nick. She is later forced to admit her feelings for Matt when her sister Karen takes an interest in him, and the two start a relationship. They break up midway through series three, and Matt becomes romantically involved with Steve's sister Allie, eventually moving into the warehouse with her. In series four, he is caught cheating on her with Stassy, and moves in with the Bordinos. In episode 97, he passes his HSC exams, and decides to take the year off to travel Australia with Stassy before starting his engineering course at uni.

==== Series 3 additions ====
- Inge Hornstra as Allie Matts (series 3–4, episodes 55–87)

Steve's 16-year-old half-sister, whom his mother Lorraine kept secret from him. After reuniting with Steve, she transfers from St Catherine's School for Girls to Hartley High, skipping ahead a year due to her high grades. Later, she becomes romantically involved with Matt and moves into the warehouse. They break up in series four after he cheats on her, and Allie grows closer to new teacher Tom Summers, who helps publish her young adult novel Clouds in the Water. She eventually discovers that she is pregnant with Tom's baby, and he is fired from the school for sexual misconduct. Allie leaves for London in episode 87 after winning a six-month literary fellowship.

- Ian Bliss as Andrew Bell (series 3–4, episodes 56–78)

The new Science teacher, replacing Southgate. He is an academic with little-to-no experience teaching high school students, and often clashes with Sam over his teaching methods. Despite their initial misgivings, they move in together when Sam needs a roommate, and eventually become romantically involved. Later, he proposes, but calls the engagement off when he catches her having sex with Rivers in the school darkroom. In episode 78, he is visited by ex-girlfriend Dana, who offers him a job on a research team in Antarctica, which he accepts.

==== Series 4 additions ====
- Jon Pollard as Alan Bolton (series 4–5, episodes 66–95, guest star in series 1–3, episodes 1–58)

A skater and class clown, known for his wild hair styles, piercings and punk-rock fashion. He initially appears in a recurring role as Rivers' best friend, a racist bully constantly antagonising the other students. After Rivers' departure, he is promoted to main cast and given more character development, falling in love with Linda Tam, a Chinese-Australian student from a rival school, and forming a strong bond with new principal Dyson and her disabled son Gary. Later, he falls for Stassy, believing they are soulmates, but she pursues Matt instead. Weeks after his HSC exams, Bolton organises a massive beach party called "Bolton's Beach Bash" in lieu of the school formal and accepts a job offer from an events company in Canberra in episode 95. According to the Where Are They Now? section on the official website run by ABC, Bolton and Stassy finally hooked up and moved to Melbourne together, where they run a market stall selling her designs.

- Deni Gordon as Ronnie Brooks (series 4–5, episodes 67–130)

The new English and History teacher, replacing Sam. She is a 40-year-old African-American woman from Harlem, New York, and is unmarried with no children. She is transferred to another school upon the closure of Hartley High in episode 130.

- Diane Craig as June Dyson (series 4–5, episodes 69–92)

The new school principal, replacing Deloraine. She has a son, Gary, who is in a wheelchair as a result of a drunk driving crash. Although she is initially disliked by the students for her strict disciplinary measures, they eventually warm to her, especially Bolton. Weeks before the HSC exams, Dyson leaves for Brisbane in episode 92, to take care of her son when he accepts a job offer there.

- Rupert Reid as Declan Costello (series 4–5, episodes 72–104)

A new student who arrives at Hartley shortly after Con's departure. He is a juvenile delinquent struggling with a gambling problem, who is repeating his HSC year by court order after an aggravated assault charge. His mother Maria suffers from multiple sclerosis. He is a singer, guitarist and former member of the band Rapscallion with his ex-girlfriend Lara, and is hired by Katerina to perform at the Shark Pool. He becomes romantically involved with Danielle, and also briefly dates Melanie in a scheme to investigate her father's purchase of the Shark Pool. In series five, he misses several HSC exams due to his mother's health problems, and is forced to repeat the year. He quits school after an argument with Bailey and takes an internship at a hospital under Ryan's mother Hilary. To his surprise, he finally finds his passion and leaves for Bathurst in episode 104 after getting accepted into a nursing program.

- Tara Jakszewicz as Anastasia "Stassy" Sumich (series 4–5, episodes 73–97)

A student from Yugoslavia whose family immigrated to Australia during the Bosnian War. She was raised in a strict and traditional household, her trucker father prevents her from socialising with the other students, and she secretly changes clothes at school behind his back. Her unique fashion style, makeup and taste in food quickly make her school outcast, as well as her tendency to manipulate the truth. She finally leaves home after her father refuses to let her work on a fashion project with Allie after school. She moves into the warehouse, and works part-time as a model to pay the rent. Later, convinced of her own psychic abilities, Stassy and Bolton turn to mysticism and believe they are soulmates, but she friend-zones him to start a relationship with Matt instead. In episode 97, she fails her HSC but decides to go travelling with Matt instead of returning to school.
Jakszewicz previously appeared in episode 35 as Tanya, a Hartley student involved with Lucy's drug-addled ex-boyfriend.

- Simon Baker-Denny as Tom Summers (series 4, episodes 80–87)

The new Science teacher, replacing Andrew. He is the son of superintendent Don Summers, and has been kicked out of previous schools for inappropriate relationships with students. He is in a long-distance relationship with Vicki Hodge, an editor at a publishing company, and encourages Allie to write a young-adult novel. He and Allie have an affair, but he abandons her after getting her pregnant. He is fired by Dyson in episode 87 when Allie exposes their relationship.

- Sebastian Goldspink as Charlie Byrd (series 4–5, episodes 81–130)

Katerina's love interest, who transfers to Hartley after they start dating over the internet. He is an aspiring computer scientist and stereotypical nerd, who Katerina rejects immediately when they meet in person. They finally hook up after Matt gives him a makeover. During the series, he struggles with his parents' divorce, briefly joins a cult and develops an addiction to caffeine pills. Disappointed by his HSC results, he decides to repeat the year. He and Katerina break up midway through series five, and he becomes romantically involved with Aurora, Anita and Melanie. However, Katerina still has feelings for Charlie, and they leave for Perth together after Hartley High closes in episode 130.

=== ABC years (1997–99) ===
==== Series 5 additions ====
- Rebecca Smart as Melanie Black (series 5–6, episodes 95–136)

Student, romantically involved with Charlie, leaves for Tasmania with her dying boyfriend Andrew in episode 136.

- Rel Hunt as Ryan Scheppers (series 5–7, episodes 98–186)

Student, Anita's older brother, romantically involved with Mai, Nikki and Sarah, graduates high school in episode 186.

- Lara Cox as Anita Scheppers (series 5–7, episodes 98–192, 203–210)

Student, Ryan's younger sister, romantically involved with Drazic, Charlie and Kurt. Cox reprises her role in the second series of the 2022 reboot.

- Tina Bursill as Hilary Scheppers (series 5–6, episodes 98–133)

Ryan and Anita's mother, nurse, moves to Melbourne to pursue a job offer in episode 133.

- Callan Mulvey as Bogdan Drazic (series 5–7, episodes 99–210)

Student, skater, troubled bad boy and class clown, Yugoslavian Australian, romantically involved with Anita, Mai and Jet, drops out of school to inherit and run his father's mechanic after his death.

- Peter Sumner as Les Bailey (series 5–6, episodes 99–134)

School principal, later a science and maths teacher at Hartley Heights, quits after a sexual harassment complaint in episode 134.

- Nina Liu as Mai Hem (series 5–6, episodes 104–152)

Student, performance artist and activist, Chinese Australian, romantically involved with Ryan and Drazic, leaves to pursue a music video directing career in episode 152.

==== Series 6 additions ====
- Fleur Beaupert as Nikki Ruark (series 6, episodes 131–169)

Student, aspiring singer, Black Australian, romantically involved with Kurt and Ryan, leaves to recover from a nervous breakdown in episode 169.

- Jeremy Lindsay Taylor as Kurt Peterson (series 6–7, episodes 131–186)

Student, school jock, aspiring marine biologist, romantically involved with Nikki, Anita and Thania, graduates high school in episode 186.
Taylor reprises his role in the 2022 reboot.

- Andrea Moor as Di Barnett (series 6–7, episodes 131–186)

School principal, gets a job at a bigger school in episode 186.

- Frederick Miragliotta as Gerrard Albers (series 6, episodes 133–152)

Humanities teacher, Spanish-Latino, leaves to become an artistic director of a regional theatre company in episode 152.

- Nathalie Roy as Sarah Livingston (series 6–7, episodes 139–150, 153–186)

student, Christian, romantically involved with Ryan, graduates high school in episode 186.

- Elaine Hudson as Kath Livingston (series 6, episodes 139–150)

Sarah's mother, housekeeper to the Scheppers family, leaves for the country in episode 150.

- Mario Gamma as Peter D'Esposito (series 6–7, episodes 151–174, guest star in episodes 137, 183–206)

Drazic's friend, Italian-Australian, owner of the Shark Pool, later works at school canteen.

- Marcel Bracks as Lee Delaine (series 6–7, episodes 153–200)

Student, school outcast, leaves for a fresh start at another school in episode 200.

- Morna Seres as Jill Delaine (series 6–7, episodes 153–200)

Lee's mother, leaves with Lee in episode 200.

- John Walton as Nat Delaine (series 6–7, episodes 153–185)

Lee's father, Humanities teacher at Hartley, leaves in episode 185.

- Putu Winchester as Dennis Klinsmann (series 6–7, episodes 170–210, guest star in episodes 131–169)

Student, class clown.

==== Series 7 additions ====
- Tasneem Roc as Thania Saya (series 7, episodes 175–210)

Student, artist, mixed Eurasian-Australian, romantically involved with Kurt and Marco.

- Bianca Nacson as Gemma Whitley (series 7, episodes 186–210)

Student, romantically involved with Zac, expelled in episode 209.

- Luke Jacobz as Zac Croft (series 7, episodes 187–210)

Student, romantically involved with Gemma, Clare (an exchange student from London) and Tess.

- Elena Carapetis as Jackie Kassis (series 7, episodes 187–210)

Science teacher, Arab Australian.

- John Gregg as Alan Carson (series 7, episodes 187–210)

School principal, English and history teacher.

- Danny Raco as Marco Vialli (series 7, episodes 191–210)

Student, Italian-Australian, romantically involved with Thania.

- Katherine Hicks as Tess Mason (series 7, episodes 201–210)

Student, goth girl, romantically involved with Zac.

- Mark Owen-Taylor as Tim Mason (series 7, episodes 201–210)

Tess's father.

== Episodes ==
| Series | Episodes | Originally released (Australia) | |
| Series | Episodes | First released | Last released |
|---|---|---|---|
| 1 | 38 | 27 February 1994 | 27 November 1994 |
| 2 | 14 | 21 May 1995 | 13 August 1995 |
| 3 | 13 | 20 August 1995 | 12 November 1995 |
| 4 | 26 | 5 August 1996 | 11 November 1996 |
| 5 | 39 | 3 February 1997 | 19 June 1997 |
| 6 | 40 | 23 June 1997 | 8 September 1998 |
| 7 | 40 | 15 July 1999 | 1 December 1999 |

== Reception ==
Mike Boone, in an article from Calgary Herald, compared the series to Beverly Hills, 90210, stating "its characters could pass for Californians in their appearance and demeanor". Debi Enker from The Age praised the show, writing "perhaps the most notable divergence from the bulk of local drama is the series' multi-cultural core", along with saying that the series has a "clear choice of grit over glamour ... The glossy vacuity and cosmetic hip of 'Beverly Hills 90210' ... have been firmly rejected."

== Distribution ==
=== International versions ===
Heartbreak High was broadcast in over 70 countries and dubbed into a number of different languages, most of which gave it a new name.

| Country | Title | Network |
|---|---|---|
| Argentina; Chile; Mexico; Peru | Aprendiendo a vivir ("Learning to live") | Canal 9 Chilevision; Azteca 13; TNP |
| Belgium; France; Canada | Heartbreak High (Flanders) Hartley, cœurs à vif ("Hartley, vivid hearts") | VRT (Flemish) & Plug RTL (French) France 2 Canal Famille & Télé-Québec (French Canadian) |
| Czech Republic; North Macedonia; Poland; Russia | Škola zlomených srdcí Uchilishte skrsheni srca Szkoła złamanych serc Школа разбитых сердец ("School of broken hearts") | SuperMax & TV Nova; A1; TVP 1 & TVN; TV-6 |
| Estonia | Koolide kool ("School of schools") | Kanal 2 |
| Germany | Heartbreak High | ZDF & Sat.1 |
| Greece | Heartbreak High | Skai TV & New Channel |
| Hungary | Szívtipró gimi ("Heartbreaking high school") | MTV1 |
| Iceland | Fjör á Fjölbraut ("Animation at school") | RÚV |
| India | Heartbreak High | Zee Café |
| Indonesia | Heartbreak High | Indosiar |
| Israel | Tichon Ha'Levavot Ha'Shvurim תיכון הלבבות השבורים ("Broken hearts high school") | Channel 1 |
| Kosovo | Vitet e arta ("Golden years") | RTV21 |
| Lithuania | Neramioji Gimnazija ("Restless gymnasium") | LRT |
| Netherlands | Heartbreak High | VARA |
| Norway | Heartbreak High | TV2 |
| Portugal | Amores e Rebeldia ("Loves & Rebellion") | RTP1 |
| Romania | Liceenii îndrăgostiţi ("High school students in love") | TVR1 |
| Serbia | Nestašne godine ("Mischievous years") | 3K RTS, TV Stankom, Art TV |
| Spain | Los Rompecorazones ("The Heartbreakers") | TVE1 & TVE2 |
| United Arab Emirates | Heartbreak High | City7tv |

The show aired in its original form in Canada on Showcase, in Ireland on RTÉ2, in the United Kingdom on BBC2, Children's BBC, Trouble and TCC, and in the United States on Encore WAM. Broadcast on children's channels in the UK were heavily edited for content.

From 2009 to 2010, ABC3 repeated the series in Australia. On 27 November 2020, all seven seasons of the show were released worldwide on streaming platform Netflix, with the exception of France, Belgium and French speaking territories, where it is available on myTF1.

=== Home releases ===
The first 26 episodes of the first season were released in Australia as a DVD box set by Umbrella Entertainment on 5 October 2011. This DVD set is region free, featuring original 4:3 Full Frame and 2.0 English Dolby Digital Sound. The last 13 episodes of the first season, along with every episode of the second season were released as a second DVD box set on 7 March 2012. The season three DVD box set was released by Umbrella Entertainment on 6 June 2012. According to Umbrella Entertainment's Facebook page, subsequent seasons of the show were never released due to music licensing issues.

The dubbed German version of the show's first season was also released in two DVD sets in Germany, with no English audio track.

=== Novelisations ===
The original stage play has been published and reprinted in conjunction with the show, along with a number of show guides and tie-in novelisations.

- The Heartbreak Kid (1988) by Richard Barrett
- Heartbreak High: Rap Pack (1994) by Meredith Costain
- Heartbreak High: Offside (1994) by Meredith Costain
- Heartbreak High. Jodies Song - in german - (1994) by Meredith Costain
- Heartbreak High. Hartley Blues - in german - (1994) by Meredith Costain
- The Official Heartbreak High Book (1995)
- Heartbreak High - The Inside Story (2021) by Ian Golden and Helen Heath
- Heartbreak High: Love/Hate (1998) by Jacquie Kent
- Heartbreak High: Making Up/Breaking Up (1998) by Jacquie Kent
- Heartbreak High: Secrets & Lies (1998) by Jacquie Kent
- Heartbreak High: Tough Call (1998) by Jacquie Kent
- Hartley, coeurs à vif. Vol. 1. Amour, amitié - in french - (2000) by Jacquie Kent
- Hartley, coeurs à vif. Vol. 2. Le Mauvais Garçon - in french - (2000) by Jacquie Kent
- Hartley, coeurs à vif. Vol. 3. Envers et contre tous - in french - (2000) by Jacquie Kent
- Hartley, coeurs à vif. Vol. 4. Règlement de compte - in french - (2001) by Jacquie Kent

=== Soundtracks ===
Heartbreak High: The Album was released in 1994, featuring music from Kulcha, Motiv8, Culture Shock, Chocolate Starfish, The Sharp, Electric Hippies, Renegade Funktrain, Hunters & Collectors, Abi Tucker, The Poor, The Screaming Jets, Baby Animals, Connie Mitchell, Sisters Underground, 3 the Hard Way, Frente! and Hoodoo Gurus. Four different editions of this album were produced: Australia, Europe, French edition (Hartley coeurs à vif - Musique du feuilleton) and German edition (Heartbreak High - Das Hitalbum zur Serie). This album was also released on cassette in Australia.

Heartbreak High: Music from the ABC TV Series was released in 1997, featuring Human Nature, My Friend the Chocolate Cake, Christine Anu, Swoop, Custard, Def FX, Past to Present, Frente!, The Badloves, The Paradise Motel and Wicked Beat Sound System.
