= For All The World To See =

1992 documentary film

- Directed by: Pat Fiske
- Produced by: Megan McMurchy
- Cinematography: Erika Addis
- Edited by: Denise Haslem
- Music by: Stephen Berry; Davood Tabrizi
- Release date: 1992
- Running time: 70 minutes
- Country: Australia
- Language: English

For All The World To See is a 1992 Australian documentary film, created by Pat Fiske, that follows Professor Fred Hollows on a trip to Eritrea and Nepal.

== Reception ==
Dougal MacDonald of the Canberra Times gave it 4 stars. He finishes "I have said little in this review about Hollows's work, the restoration of sight in people living in poverty. The film admirably tells that story, delivering a superbly crafted coda which, without fanfare or hype, leaves no doubt about the esteem with which the people he has helped to help themselves regard him." Neil Jillett in The Age says "This excellent documentary by US-born director Pat Fiske presents Hollows as a man whose folksy manner at times seems less than genuine, but whose nobility as a practical humanitarian is never in doubt."

== Awards ==
- 1993 Australian Film Institute Awards
  - Best Documentary - Pat Fiske - won
  - Best Achievement in Cinematography in a Non-Feature Film - David Parer - won
