= The Heartbreak Kid (1993 film) =

1993 Australian film

- Release poster
- Directed by: Michael Jenkins
- Written by: Michael Jenkins; Richard Barrett
- Produced by: Ben Gannon
- Starring: Claudia Karvan; Alex Dimitriades; Nico Lathouris; Steve Bastoni; Doris Younane; William McInnes
- Cinematography: Nino Martinetti
- Edited by: Peter Carrodus
- Music by: John Clifford White
- Distributed by: Village Roadshow
- Release dates: June 11, 1993 (Sydney Film Festival); June 17, 1993 (Australia)
- Running time: 93 minutes
- Country: Australia
- Languages: English; Greek

The Heartbreak Kid is a 1993 Australian romantic comedy film directed by Michael Jenkins, who, with Richard Barrett, also wrote the script. It stars Claudia Karvan as Christina Papadopoulos, a 22-year-old Greek-Australian teacher who falls in love with her 17-year-old, soccer-obsessed student, Nick Polides, played by Alex Dimitriades. The supporting cast includes Nico Lathouris, Steve Bastoni, Doris Younane and William McInnes.

The film was based on the 1987 stage play of the same name. It was filmed in the inner suburb of Prahran, Victoria, with many of its real students co-opted as extras. Scenes at the teacher's family home were shot in Avondale Heights in Melbourne's north-west.

The film premiered at the Sydney Film Festival on 11 June 1993, before being released theatrically in Australia on 17 June of the same year. It received positive reviews from critics, praising the cast and representation of a multicultural Australia through a Greek-Australian lens. It was also a box office success in Australia. It was nominated for three Australian Film Institute awards, including Best Film.

Michael Jenkins and Ben Gannon developed the 1994 television series Heartbreak High as a spin-off of the film, with several cast members reprising their roles, reimagined in a Sydney setting.

== Plot ==
Christina Papadopoulos is a 22-year-old high school teacher, engaged to ambitious lawyer Dimitri. Christina's entire future seems planned out for her—albeit planned by her fiancé, her father and her priest.

Lively 17-year-old Nick Polides is a student in Christina's Greek class at their inner city high school and a soccer fanatic who supports local Melbourne club South Melbourne FC. Nick finds himself attracted to Christina and makes numerous passes at her which she rebuffs. But her resistance begins to crumble as both begin to rebel against the constricting Greek-Australian cultural restraints put upon them.

When Christina becomes the manager of the school's newly formed soccer team, she and Nick begin to spend more time together outside of school hours. Though Christina is initially hesitant at Nick's continuous advances, she soon gives into impulses and engages in an illicit relationship with Nick. She uses the house left by her friend for rendezvous with Nick outside school hours. Their amorous relationship progresses quickly as they fall in love with each other. But as the news of their relationship leaks out, Christina faces severe shaming at her workplace. She is further berated by Nick's father for breaking the trust placed upon her as a teacher. Her fiancé learns of the relationship and gives her a choice that he is willing to let the matter slide if she promises to act as if her past with Nick never occurred. But Christina, by then very much in love with Nick and tired of her overbearing fiancé, breaks off the engagement and leaves to meet up with Nick. She tells Nick of her decision to leave Dimitri and mentions that she would be pursuing overseas postgraduate studies for two years until Nick graduates. An overjoyed Nick readily agrees and promises to meet up after two years. The film ends on a positive note with their kiss and soccer-play under the sun.

Australian theatrical release poster

== Cast ==
- Claudia Karvan as Christina Papadopoulos
- Alex Dimitriades as Nick Polides
- Steve Bastoni as Dimitri Yiannos
- Nico Lathouris as George Polides
- Doris Younane as Evdokia
- Scott Major as Peter Rivers
- George Vidalis as Vasili
- Louise Mandylor as Eleni
- William McInnes as Southgate
- Bao Quach as Tran
- Katherine Halliday as Maria

== Soundtrack ==
1. "The Heartbreak Kid" (John Clifford White) – John Clifford White
2. "Teacher I Need You" (Elton John and Bernie Taupin) – Stephen Cummings
3. "Love Is All Around" (Reg Presley) – The Persuasions
4. "I Can Just (Lose Myself in You)" (Brian Cadd and David Hirschfelder) – Lisa Edwards
5. "Vision" (Ashley Rothchild, James MacKinnon, Sean Fonti) – Caligula
6. "One" (Paul Hewson, Adam Clayton, Larry Mullen Jr., David Evans) – U2
7. "True Love" (Art Neville, Daryl Johnson, Hawk Wolinski) – The Neville Brothers
8. "Great Palaces of Immortal Splendour" (Single Gun Theory) – Single Gun Theory
9. "Words Written Backwards" (Single Gun Theory) – Single Gun Theory
10. "Mozart Requiem, K. 626 – Introitus" – Cecilia Bartoli (mezzo-soprano), Vienna Philharmonic
11. "Mozart Requiem, K. 626 – Lacrimosa" – Cecilia Bartoli, Vienna Philharmonic
12. "Looking for Nick" (John Clifford White)
13. "Father and Son" (John Clifford White)
14. "Anthem" (John Clifford White)

== Production ==
Mike Jenkins developed the script with Richard Barrett, who wrote the original play, over two years, doing around seven drafts. Jenkins and the cast then rehearsed for three weeks. The soccer scenes were filmed at South Melbourne's old ground at Middle Park (stadium) with Socceroo Con Boutsianis as the stand in for the soccer scenes involving Nick.

Jenkins and Gannon brought their Sydney production team to Melbourne as Victoria offered more funding incentives are more appropriate shooting locations.

=== Casting ===
The Greek-Australian characters are largely portrayed by actors from the community. Karvan was not ethnically Greek, but was partly raised by a Greek-Australian stepfather, from whom she has her surname. Gannon was pleased with her casting and performance: "It's such a difficult role. You don't want somebody coming across as a schoolteacher preying on a young student." Gannon continued: "She is intelligent. She has a complexity. You can believe she is Greek."

Dimitriades attended an open casting call in south-west Sydney and was cast in what was his screen debut and breakout role.

== Reception ==
=== Box office ===
The film was a commercial success upon release. The Heartbreak Kid took in A$2,658,819 at the box office, making it the 74th most successful Australian film (1966–2008).

=== Critical reception ===
The film was praised by critic David Stratton, writing in Variety "[Karvan] plays her role with distinction, capturing the moral dilemma of the young teacher who’s faced with the choice between a secure but dull marriage in the future or an unwise, ardent relationship in the present. Dimitriades, who has never acted before, is a natural find as her passionate young lover." Stratton also praised the representation of Greek-Australians and use of Greek dialogue: "The film presents a vision of a multicultural Australia rarely captured in feature films." David Bongiorno also praised the film in The Canberra Times: "Richard Barrett and Michael Jenkins's script rings true, their observations of ethno-Australian life are genuine." Bongiorno continued to praise the "explosive debut" of Dimitriades and Karvan for earning "much sympathy" for her character.

The Heartbreak Kid received three nominations at the 1993 Australian Film Institute Awards in the categories of Best Film, Best Director (Jenkins) and Best Supporting Actor (Lathouris). The film was nominated for and won Best Screenplay at the Montreal World Film Festival in 1993.

== Legacy ==
In a 2020 interview, Dimitriades expressed surprise that he receives more feedback on the subsequent TV series than the film: "It's weird because the film was really successful and launched me personally, but I seem to get more feedback on the series." In the same year, Karvan expressed feeling uncomfortable about having portrayed an ethnic Greek character: "I only 'fessed up recently that I felt so embarrassed I played a Greek girl. Can you imagine how I would be taken down today?"

In a 2024 interview, Karvan commented on The Heartbreak Kid saying that she doesn't "take responsibility" for the controversial storyline: "I didn't write it. I didn't direct it. I didn't produce it... I was a 19 year old girl. And it was a tough job. I felt like I was an adult, and I was playing a very adult role... I probably wasn't that equipped to do it. I got through and I did it, but it wasn't my favourite job." She also pointed out that a friend of hers had recently seen the film and was less troubled by the age gap than the fact that the Nick character "pretty much (stalks)" Christina.
