= Exile and the Kingdom (film) =

1993 documentary film

- Directed by: Frank Rijavec
- Written by: Frank Rijavec; Noelene Harrison
- Produced by: Frank Rijavec; Roger Solomon
- Narrated by: Roger Solomon (Yirra-Bindirri)
- Release date: 1993
- Running time: 111 minutes
- Country: Australia
- Language: English

Exile and the Kingdom is a 1993 documentary film that looks at the destruction of Indigenous culture in Western Australia's Pilbara region.

== Reception ==
Writing in the Sunday Age Debi Enker says "This eloquent film has a quiet passion and justifiable anger that only gradually emerge and it will be a revelation for urban whites for whom questions of native title and land rights might seem remote and impenetrably complicated." The Age's Tom Ryan reviews it positively saying "Quite properly, 'Exile And The Kingdom' is an angry film. And, even if it is too neatly packaged to be strictly described as anthropological, it speaks with a compelling voice about the struggle for survival of an invaded people." Also in the Age Ross Warneke finishes "By allowing the Aborigines to tell their own rich and colorful story, without any apparent editorial interference from those behind the cameras, Exile and the Kingdom made a valuable contribution to the Mabo debate. This was a documentary of great merit, and a repeat screening should be compulsory viewing for all Australians." Tim Rowse's Filmnews review begins "The great achievement of this film is that it allows two related groups of Aboriginal people from the Pilbara region, the Injibamdi and the Ngamula, to relocate themselves within the spatial grid through which we are used to seeing them."

== Awards ==
- 1993 Australian Film Institute Awards
  - Best Documentary - Frank Rijavec - won
  - Best Achievement in Sound in a Non-Feature Film - Noelene Harrison, Lawrie Silvestrin, Kim Lord - won
- 1994 Human Rights Medal
  - Film/TV documentary - won
