= The Young Wife (TV series) =

- Genre: Miniseries
- Based on: The Young Wife by David Martin
- Written by: Linda Aronson
- Directed by: Oscar Whitbread
- Starring: Nico Lathouris
- Country of origin: Australia
- Original language: English
- No. of episodes: 3

Production
- Producer: Oscar Whitbread
- Running time: 3 x 1 hour

Original release
- Network: ABC
- Release: 24 July 1983 – 1983

The Young Wife is a 1984 Australian mini-series about young Greeks in Melbourne.

== Cast ==
- Nico Lathouris - Yaumis
- Peter Katsaitis - Criton
- Christine Totos - Anna
- Olivia Hamnett - Patricia Barwing
- Simon Chilvers - Peter Barwing
