= Nico Lathouris =

Australian actor

- Born: 1944 (age 81–82); Melbourne, Victoria, Australia
- Education: National Institute of Dramatic Art (BFA)
- Occupations: Actor, writer
- Years active: 1971–present

Nico Lathouris (born 1944) is an Australian actor and writer. He is best known for his roles as George Polides in the 1993 romantic comedy film The Heartbreak Kid and as George Poulos in the 1994 television teen drama spin-off Heartbreak High. In both, he plays a Greek Australian patriarch, father of the protagonist, Nick (Alex Dimitriades). Lathouris was nominated for Best Supporting Actor for his role in the film at the 1993 Australian Film Institute Awards.

He is also the co-screenwriter of Mad Max: Fury Road (2015) and Furiosa: A Mad Max Saga (2024).

== Life and career ==
Lathouris is a second generation Greek Australian, and born to Greek parents in Melbourne.

In 1977, he performed on stage with the Nimrod Theatre Company for David Hare's play, Fanshen.

Lathouris has worked on the television series Police Rescue. At the 1991 Australian Film Institute Awards he was nominated for the AFI Award for Best Lead Actor in a Television Drama.

He also appeared in George Miller's film Mad Max (1979) as a car mechanic. He also ran film and drama workshops for the Australian Film Commission.

Lathouris also had a guest role in The Flying Doctors as the father of Soula, DJ's love interest in seasons 2 and 3.

He is best known for his roles as George Polides in the 1993 romantic comedy film The Heartbreak Kid and as George Poulos in the 1994 television teen drama spin-off Heartbreak High. In both, he plays a Greek Australian patriarch, father of the protagonist, Nick (Alex Dimitriades). Lathouris was nominated for Best Supporting Actor for his role in the film at the 1993 Australian Film Institute Awards.

He is also credited by Dimitriades as his mentor on the film and credited the success of the TV series for Lathouris' role as dramaturge, coaching the younger cast members. He helped to develop realistic characters from a whole variety of ethnic backgrounds. The series marked a big shift in the way that life in Australia is represented in TV drama. In the past, many shows had not reflected all the different cultures which exist side-by-side in Australia's big cities, and Heartbreak High broke the mould by acknowledging and celebrating the country's cultural mix.

Lathouris is co-screenwriter (alongside George Miller and Brendan McCarthy) of Mad Max: Fury Road (2015) and Furiosa: A Mad Max Saga (2024). At the 42nd Saturn Awards he was nominated with Miller and McCarthy for the Saturn Award for Best Writing. The trio were also nominated by the Film Critics Circle of Australia for Best Script/Screenplay.

== Selected filmography ==
- Journey Among Women (1977) - Soldier
- Mad Max (1979) - Grease Rat
- Desolation Angels (1982) - Nightman
- Where the Green Ants Dream (1984) - Arnold
- The Young Wife (1984, TV Movie) - Yannis
- Wrong World (1985) - Rangott
- Rikky and Pete (1988) - Con Ionides
- Georgia (1988) - Bystander #2
- Belinda (1988) - Benny Rose
- Against the Innocent (1989) - Tim McKenzie
- Father (1990) - Amos
- Death in Brunswick (1990) - Mustafa
- Heaven Tonight (1990) - Hot dog man
- Jigsaw (1990) - Ed Minter
- The Heartbreak Kid (1993) - George Polides
- Only the Brave (1994) - Laslo
- Gino (1994) - Rocco Petri
- Heartbreak High (1994) - George Poulos
- What I Have Written (1996) - Claude Murnane
- Serenades (2001) - Mullah Jalal-Shah
- Mad Max: Fury Road (2015, Writer)
- Furiosa: A Mad Max Saga (2024, Writer)
