= Elly Varrenti =

- Born: May 5, 1960 (age 66); Melbourne, Australia
- Occupations: Actress; singer; writer; teacher; broadcaster
- Years active: 1989–present
- Children: 1
- Website: ellyvarrenti.website

Elly Varrenti (born May 5, 1960) is an Australian columnist, freelance writer, teacher, actress and broadcaster.

== Career ==
Varrenti was born on May 5, 1960, in Melbourne. An actress and singer, she has performed with the Melbourne Theatre Company, Playbox Theatre, La Mama, Theatreworks and ABC Radio National. Ms Varrenti has also appeared in several television serials.

As a radio broadcaster she has worked for community radio 3RRR, ABC Melbourne and ABC Radio National.

In 2008, Penguin Books published her memoir This Is Not My Beautiful Life and a short story in the anthology How We Met.

Affirm Press published Ms Varrenti's story, Seriously funny, in the anthology of women’s writing, She’s Having a Laugh in 2015.

As a freelance writer and columnist she has contributed to The Age, The Australian, The Australian Women’s Weekly, Mamamia, Hoopla, Daily Life, The Good Weekend, The Australian Education Union, The Big Issue and Daily Review.

She was a theatre critic for The Melbourne Times from 2007 to 2009, for The Age from 2011 to 2012, and a book critic for The Australian and The Age in 2016 and 2017.

She taught Creative Writing at Deakin University in 2014 and at the University of Melbourne in 2015, 2016, 2017 and 2018.
