= Ben Gannon (producer) =

Australian film producer (1952–2007)

Bernard Norman Gannon AO (23 September 1952 – 4 January 2007), known as Ben Gannon, was an Australian film, television and stage producer.

== Early life and education ==
Born Bernard Norman Gannon in Maffra in Victoria's Gippsland, his father was a land surveyor and farmer.

After schooling at Melbourne's Xavier College Lanbury House, Gannon graduated from the then production course of the National Institute of Dramatic Art in Sydney in 1970.

He was known as Ben.

== Career ==
After graduation, Gannon worked at the Queensland Theatre Company, before stage-managing the original Australian production of Jesus Christ Superstar for Harry M. Miller Attractions. This was followed by eight years in London, where Gannon was company manager of Hair in the West End, and worked as a theatrical agent at the American talent sgency, ICM, before forming his own talent agency, representing actors, writers, directors, and designers.

Gannon returned to Australia in 1980 and was appointed general manager of Associated R & R Films, the Robert Stigwood/Rupert Murdoch joint venture which produced the acclaimed film Gallipoli, of which he was associate producer. After forming his own production company, View Films, he produced two mini-series Shout! The Story of Johnny O'Keefe (starring Terry Serio) and Shadow of the Cobra (starring Rachel Ward and Art Malik).

He produced the award-winning films Travelling North (starring Leo McKern), Sweet Talker (starring Bryan Brown and Karen Allen), Daydream Believer – also known as The Girl Who Came Late (starring Miranda Otto and Martin Kemp), Hammers Over the Anvil (starring Charlotte Rampling and Russell Crowe), and The Man Who Sued God (starring Billy Connolly and Judy Davis).

His film The Heartbreak Kid, based on the play by Richard Barrett, was the catalyst for his award-winning television series Heartbreak High. This proved to be one of Australia's most successful television exports ever, being sold to 80 countries, and eventually running to 210 hours.

Believing that there was a stage musical in the life and compositions of the Australian songwriter/performer Peter Allen after being alerted to him by Stephen MacLean, he commissioned a book to be written by Nick Enright, based on MacLean's earlier biography. Enright's version was published as Peter Allen: The Boy From Oz. He first produced a documentary of the same name for ABC Television, which aired in 1995.

In 1998 Gannon co-produced with London producer Robert Fox, Australia's highest-grossing theatre production The Boy from Oz, based on Enright's book and directed by Gale Edwards – which was successfully presented on Broadway, receiving a 2004 Tony Award nomination for Best Musical, and winning the Tony for Best Male Performer in a Musical for its star, Hugh Jackman.

== Honours ==
Gannon was appointed an Officer of the Order of Australia (AO) in 2006 "For service to the performing arts as a producer contributing to the development of film, television, and theatre in Australia, and in promoting Australian productions and talented actors overseas, and to the community".

== Death ==
He died of cancer, at home in Sydney on 4 January 2007, aged 54. He had been treated for cancer in 2003.

== Filmography ==
=== Film ===
| Year | Title | Credit | Type |
|---|---|---|---|
| 1981 | Gallipoli | Associate producer | Feature film |
| 1987 | Travelling North | Producer | Feature film |
| 1991 | Sweet Talker | Producer | Feature film |
| 1992 | Daydream Believer (aka The Girl Who Came Late) | Producer | Feature film |
| 1993 | Hammers over the Anvil | Producer | Feature film |
| 1993 | The Heartbreak Kid | Producer | Feature film |
| 2001 | The Man Who Sued God | Co-producer | Feature film |

=== Television ===
| Year | Title | Credit | Type |
|---|---|---|---|
| 1989 | Shadow of the Cobra | Producer | TV miniseries, 2 episodes |
| 1986 | Shout! The Story of Johnny O'Keefe | Producer | TV miniseries, 2 episodes |
| 1994–96 | Heartbreak High | Creator / Executive producer / producer | TV series, 178 episodes |
| 1994–96 | Heartbreak High | Writer | TV series, 15 episodes |
| 1995 | Peter Allen: The Boy from Oz | Co-producer | TV documentary film |
| 1996 | The South Bank Show | Producer | TV series, 1 episode |
| 1997–99 | Wildside | Creator / Executive producer | TV series, 40 episodes |
| 2001 | Head Start | Executive producer / producer | TV miniseries |

== Theatre ==
| Year | Title | Role | Venue / Co. |
|---|---|---|---|
| | Jesus Christ Superstar | Stage manager | Harry M. Miller Attractions |
| | Hair | Company manager | West End, London |
| 1998 | The Boy from Oz | Co-producer | Australian tour & Broadway |
