= Zbych Trofimiuk =

Australian language teacher, academic, and actor

- Born: 7 April 1979 (age 47); Prague, Czechoslovakia

Zbych Trofimiuk (born 7 April 1979) is a Czech-Australian language teacher, academic, and actor. He is known for his award-winning performance as Mike Masters in the children's television adventure series Sky Trackers, and as the lead character Paul Reynolds in the children's science fiction series Spellbinder.

== Personal life ==
Born in Warsaw in Poland in 1979, to Prague-born sculptor Zoja Trofimiuk and Jurek Trofimiuk, the languages of his early years were Czech, Polish, and German. At four years old, he emigrated with his parents to Melbourne, Australia, where he began to learn English.

In 2004, he graduated from Melbourne's Victoria University with a B.A. in Performance Studies.

== Career ==
=== Television ===
Trofimiuk is known for his work as a child actor in Australian television productions.

In 1990, he appeared in ABC's Choices, a short series of mini-dramas about peer pressure and the choices individual children have to make.

In 1994, he appeared in an episode of Network 10's short-lived continuation of the popular Australian soap opera, A Country Practice.

In 1995, Trofimiuk starred in leading roles in two drama series for children: first in the educational adventure series Sky Trackers, playing Mike Masters, for which he won the Australian Film Institute's Young Actor Award; and second as the protagonist, Paul Reynolds, in the science fiction series Spellbinder. Both Sky Trackers and Spellbinder won the Australian Film Institute's Award for Best Children's Television Drama (in 1994 and 1996 respectively). Also in 1995, Trofimiuk guested in an episode of the second series of Snowy River - The McGregor Saga.

=== Theatre ===
In 2005, Trofimiuk performed in the play "Bunny", written and directed by Benjamin Cittadini, at the La Mama Theatre in Melbourne, Australia.

In 2007, he co-directed La Mama's production "Elmo" with its playwright Cittadini. The play was a follow-up to "Bunny," and the second play in the author's "Trilogy of Love Stories."

=== Film ===
Trofimiuk played the role of Kane in the 2006 independent film Clean.

=== Teaching and research ===
Since 2006, Trofimiuk has taught English as a foreign language, as a teacher in Australia's English Language Intensive Courses for Overseas Students (ELICOS) scheme; and he is an educational researcher at Melbourne's Monash University, in the Digital Education Research Group.

== Awards ==
- Australian Film Institute's Young Actor Award, for Sky Trackers, 1994
- Premier's VCE Award, 1996

== Filmography ==
=== Television ===
Year	Film	Role	Notes
1990	Choices		TV series
1994	A Country Practice		TV series, episode 14.14: "Tuesday's Child"
1994	Sky Trackers	Mike Masters	TV series
1995	Snowy River: The McGregor Saga		TV series, episode 2.4: "Fathers and Sons"
1995	Spellbinder	Paul Reynolds	TV series

=== Film ===
Year	Film	Role	Notes
2006	Clean	Kane	Independent feature film

== Theatre ==
Year	Film	Role	Notes
2005	Bunny		La Mama Theatre
2007	Elmo	Co-director	Follow-up to Bunny and second play in the "Trilogy of Love Stories"
