= Zoja Trofimiuk =

Australian sculptor and printmaker (born 1952)

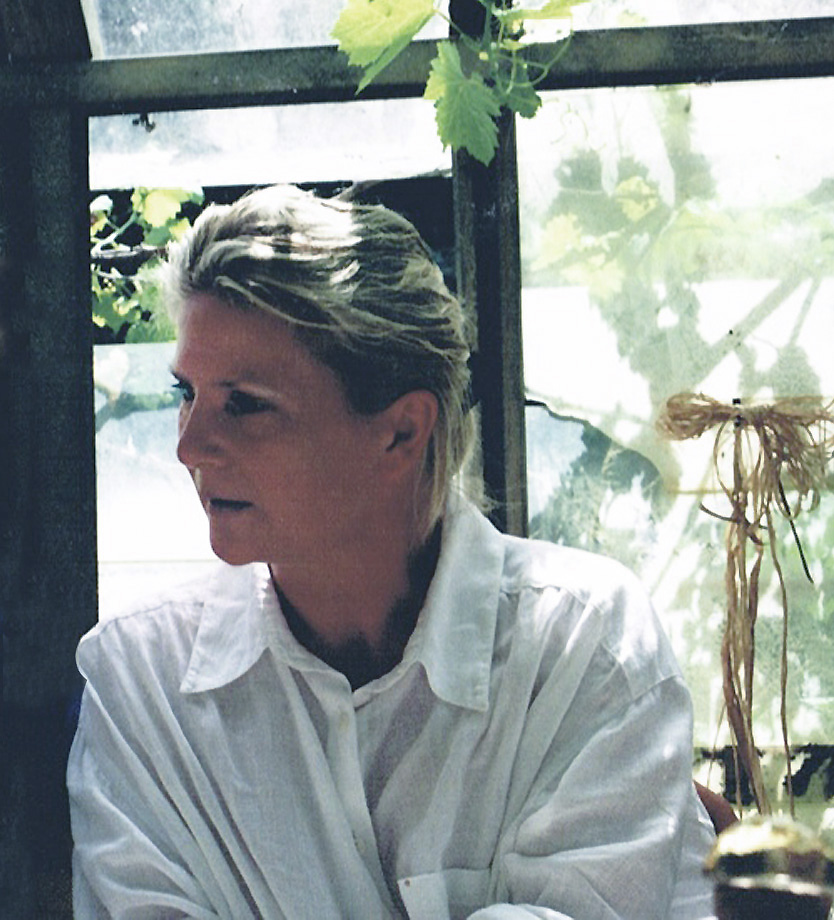
- Zoja Trofimiuk in her studio in Melbourne in June 1998
- Born: 1952 (age 73–74); Prague, Czechoslovakia
- Education: Václav Hollar Art School, Jan Matejko Academy of Fine Arts, RMIT University
- Style: cast glass
- Relatives: Zbych Trofimiuk (son)

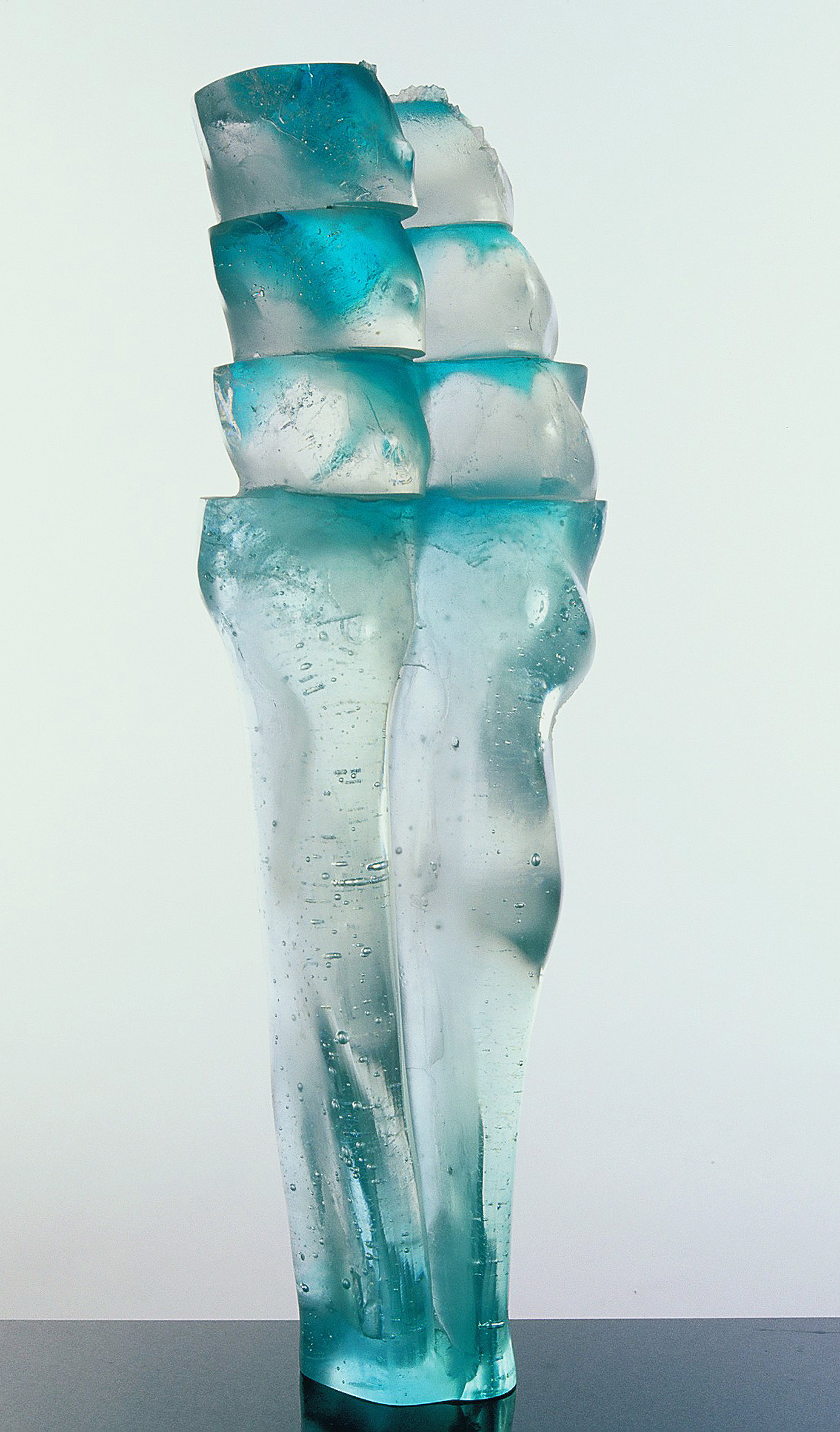
GOOGLE GIRL, cast glass, lead crystal, sandblasted, polished, diamond cut, 60x23cm, 2005

Zoja Trofimiuk (born 1952) is an Australian sculptor and printmaker, born in Prague, Czechoslovakia. She specializes in cast glass; her studio is in Melbourne.

== Education ==
Trofimiuk studied at the Václav Hollar Art School in Prague, Czech Republic, from 1969 until 1972. In 1972, she enrolled at the Academy of Fine Arts in Kraków, Poland. She graduated in 1977 and was awarded a diploma in Fine Art. Trofimiuk went on to earn a Master of Fine Arts degree at RMIT University in Melbourne, Australia in 1991.

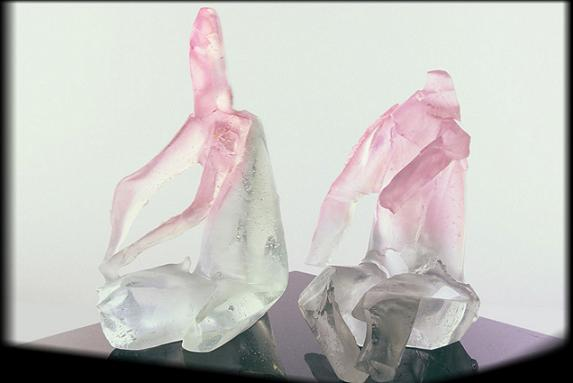
Spring Lovers

== Exhibitions ==
- 1991 - TORSO, Hugo Gallery, Canberra
- 1996 - WORKS on PAPER, George Gallery, Melbourne
- 1999 - MILLENNIUM COLLECTION, Adam Galleries, Melbourne
- 2001 - OCEAN GALLERY inaugurated from Australian Shores
- 2005 - SCULPTURE and GRAVERRE, Adam galleries, Melbourne
- 2006 - IX International Glass Symposium,
  - Curator: Prof. Sylva Petrova, PhD., MA, BA, Novy Bor, Czech Republic
- 2006 - Ranamok Glass Award, touring exhibition, Australia
  - Works on Paper 2, NS, Nova sin gallery, Prague, Czech Republic
- 2007 - Czech and Slovak Glass in Exile, Regional Moravian Gallery, Brno, Czech Republic

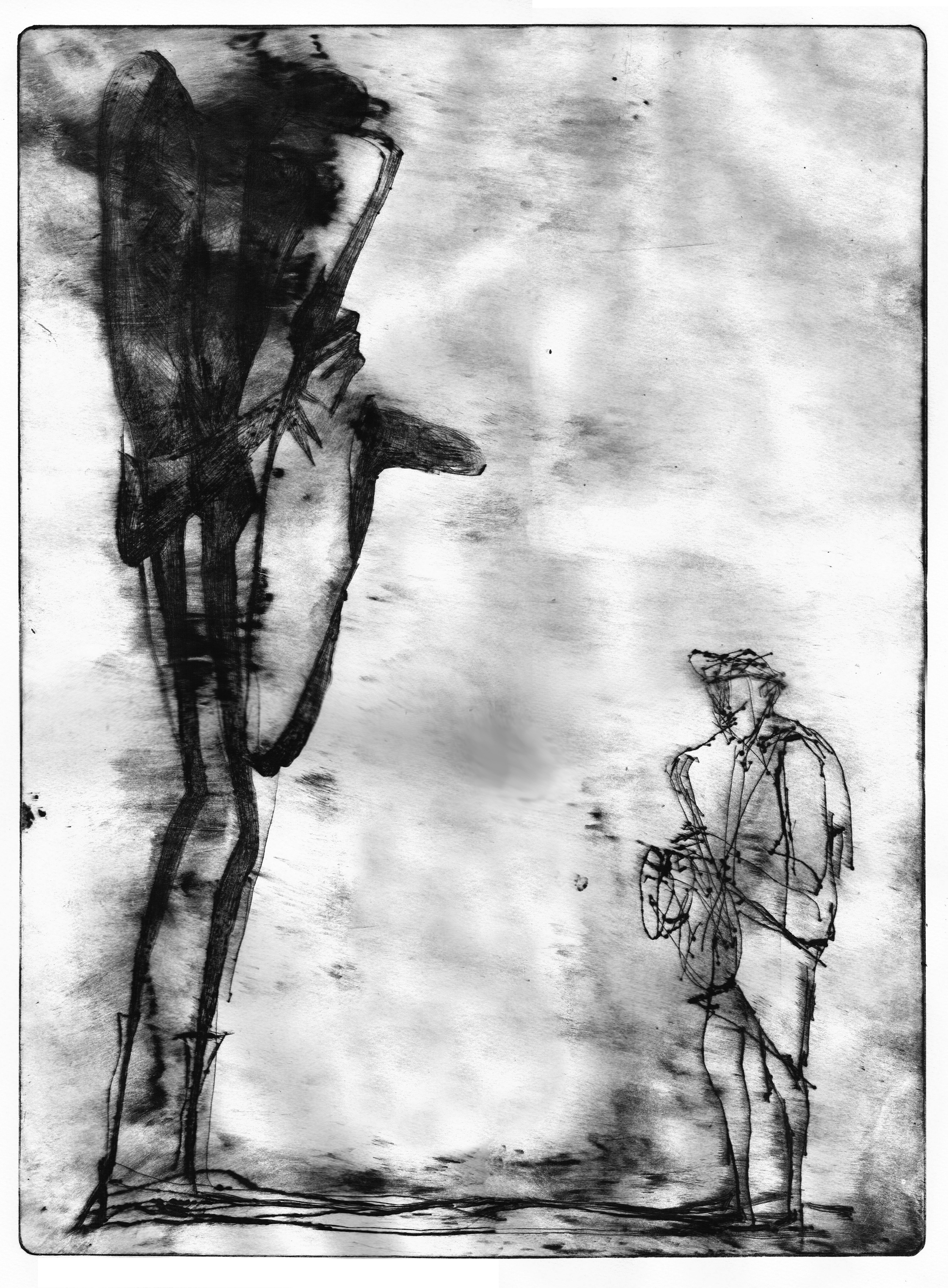
Duet, dry point

== Awards ==
- 1981, 1990 - Honorary Award, Dante's Biennale, Ravenna, Italy
- 1999 - One of six artists selected for the annual Print Commission, Print Council of Australia
- 2006 - Ranamok Glass Prize, finalist
- 2018 - Mildura Print Triennial finalist
- 2020 - VAS SCULPTURE AWARD CONTEMPORARY EXHIBITION winner
- 2021 - Australian Monoprint Biennial Prize, finalist
- 2022 - VAS SCULPTURE AWARD, SUMMER EXHIBITION, second prize
- 2023 - VAS SCULPTURE AWARD, AUTUMN EXHIBITION, winner
- 2024 - VAS SCULPTURE AWARD, AUTUMN EXHIBITION, third prize

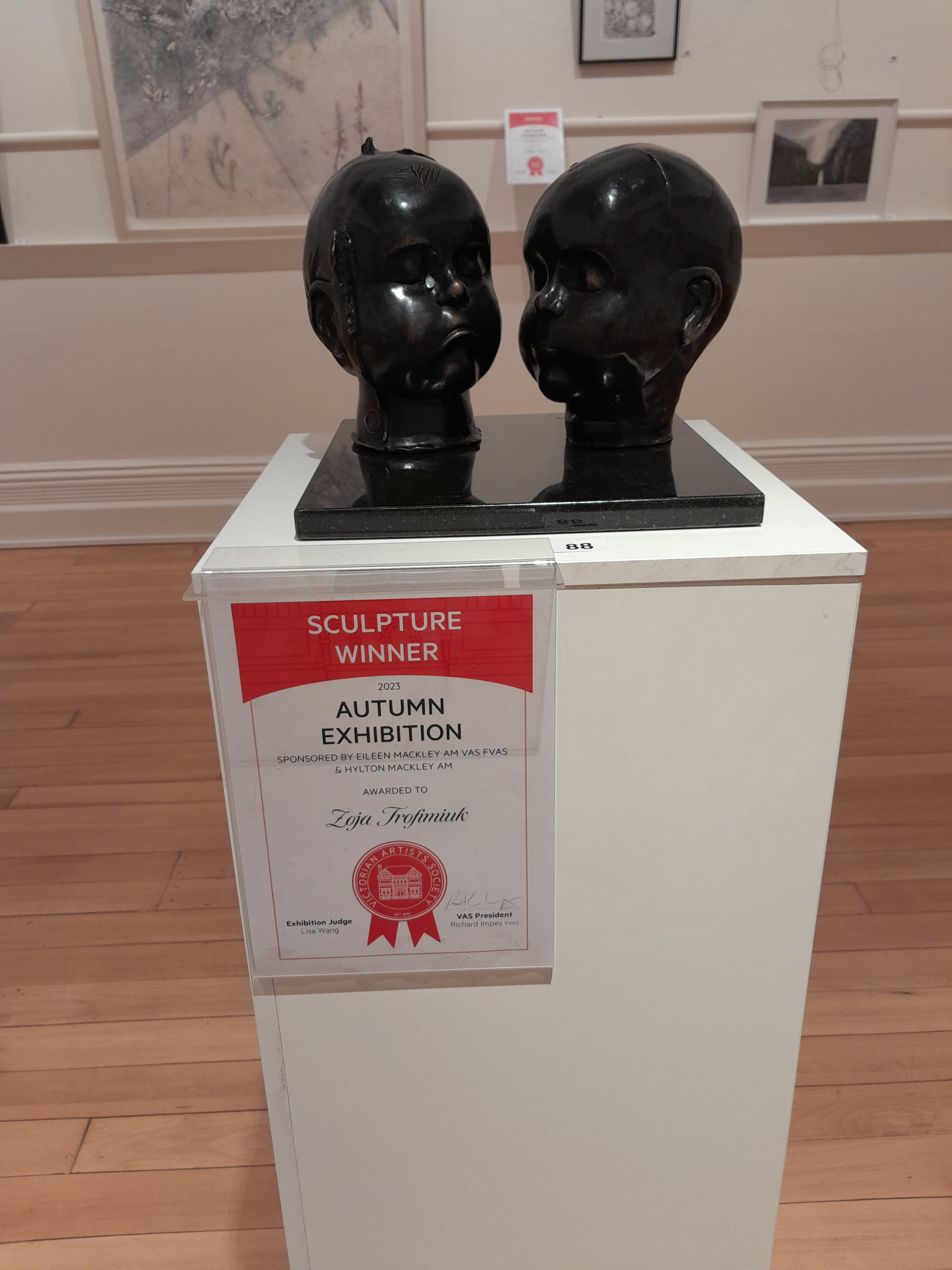

2024 - VAS Sculpture Award, Winner/Visible Absence/ VAS Sculpture Award, Highly Commented /Muse/

== Personal life ==
Zbych Trofimiuk, an Australian actor, is her son.
