= Sky Trackers =

Television series

- Sky Trackers (VHS cover)
- Created by: Jeff Peck; Tony Morphett
- Directed by: Mario Andreacchio; Julian McSwiney; Steve Jodrell
- Starring: Petra Yared; Zbych Trofimiuk; Emily-Jane Romig; Steve Jacobs; Anna-Maria Monticelli
- Composer: Cezary Skubiszewski
- Country of origin: Australia
- No. of episodes: 26

Production
- Executive producer: Patricia Edgar
- Producers: Margot McDonald; Patricia Edgar
- Cinematography: David Foreman; Nino Martinetti
- Running time: 25 minutes
- Production company: ACTF Productions

Original release
- Network: Seven Network
- Release: 19 March – 10 September 1995

Sky Trackers is a 26-part science-based Australian children's television adventure series, and a stand-alone children's television movie of the same name, which feature the adventures of children who live at space-tracking stations in Australia. Both series and telemovie were created by Jeff Peck and Tony Morphett, and executive-produced by Patricia Edgar on behalf of the Australian Children's Television Foundation (ACTF).

The 1990 telemovie was shot at the Canberra Deep Space Communication Complex, at Tidbinbilla in the Australian Capital Territory. The subsequent TV series, which had an entirely new cast fronted by Petra Yared and Zbych Trofimiuk, was shot at the Australia Telescope Compact Array in the New South Wales outback near Narrabri. The series aired in Australia in 1995, on the Seven Network. Although the series and movie have characters in common, they do not share continuity.

Sky Trackers the series grew from a request by Australia's federal science agency (the CSIRO) to Patricia Edgar, the then director of the ACTF, to create a program that would help attract girls towards careers in science. The resultant series aimed to popularise science for children through drama, and to excite them about its opportunities and its potential for future career choices, and at the same time demystify the work and working conditions of scientists.

Sky Trackers the series won the Australia Film Institute's Award for Best Children's Drama Series (1994), and Zbych Trofimiuk picked up its award for Young Actor. Sky Trackers also won at the Cairo International Film Festival for Children (1994) and the Australian Teachers of Media (ATOM) Awards (1995).

== Series synopsis ==
Combining adventure, teenage romance, and scientific endeavour, Sky Trackers the series centres around three kids who live beneath the gleaming white dishes of a space tracking station in the Australian outback – where their scientist parents work.

Nikki is 13 and loves science. Her dream is to be an astronaut and the first person on Mars. She is an avid fan of Mike's famous astrophysicist father.

Mike is 14 and loves playing electric guitar, horse-riding, and rollerblading; but he has a poor relationship with his workaholic father. Jimi Hendrix is his hero. And although Mike thinks "science sucks" when he arrives at the station with his father, he quickly becomes friends with Nikki, and her younger sister Maggie.

Together, the kids share adventures where they use the station's high-tech facilities to solve scientific problems and save lives.

== Series cast ==
=== Main ===
- Petra Yared as Nikki Colbert (credited as Petra Jared)
- Zbych Trofimiuk as Mike Masters
- Emily-Jane Romig as Maggie Colbert
- Steve Jacobs as Tony Masters
- Anna-Maria Monticelli as Marie Colbert

=== Recurring ===
- Gareth Yuen as Joe
- Paul Sonkkila as Frank Giles
- Marco Chiappi as Christian
- Rosalind Hammond as Elfie
- Max Phipps

=== Guests ===
- Damian Walshe-Howling as Hoon (1 episode)
- Luke Carroll as Simon Tjapiljari (1 episode)
- Nicholas Bell as Dan (1 episode)
- Shane Connor as Sergeant Blake (2 episodes)

== History ==
=== TV movie ===
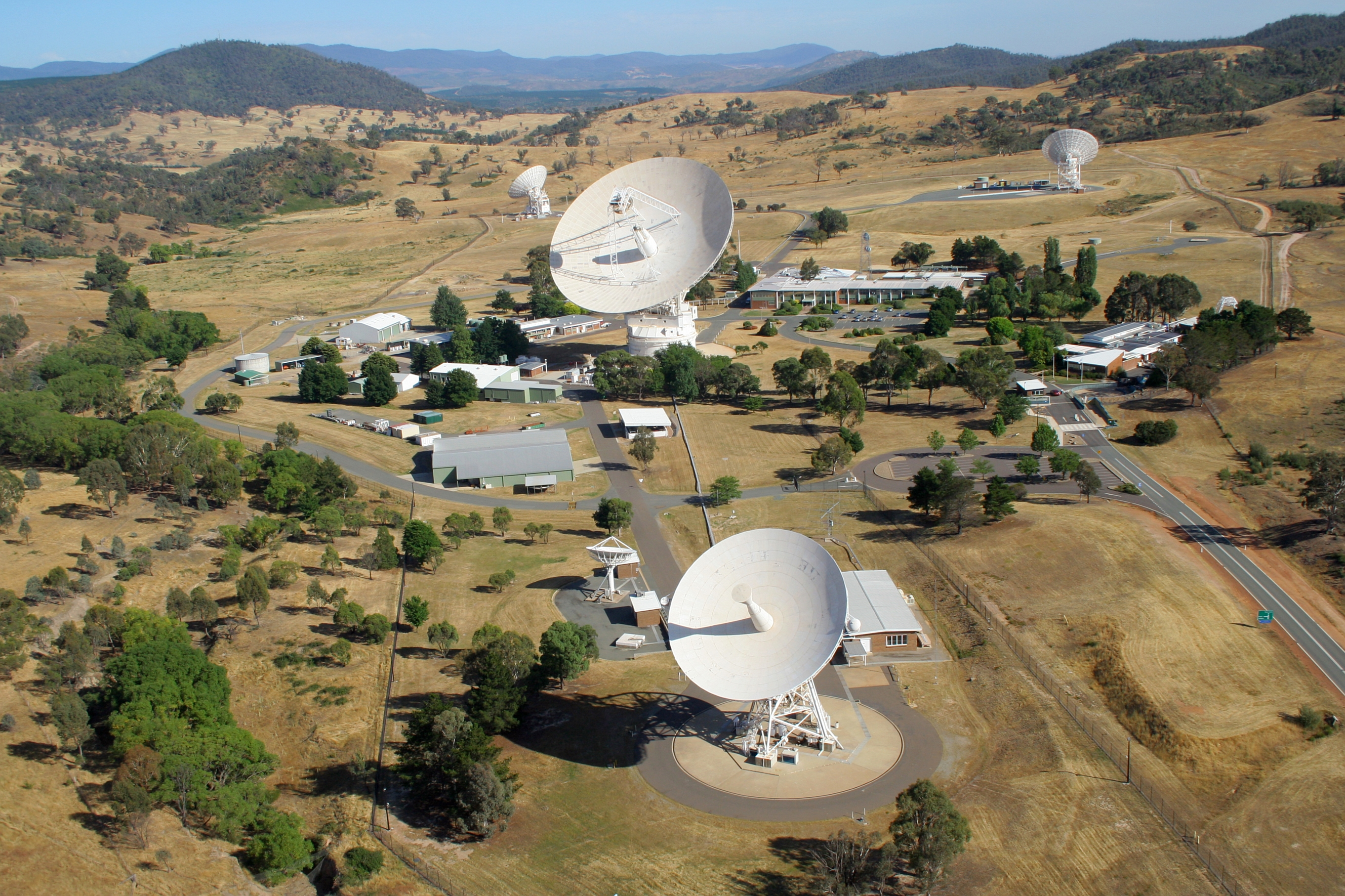
Tidbinbilla Tracking Station - now called Canberra Deep Space Communication Complex - the setting for Sky Trackers movie

The Sky Trackers telemovie was produced by the Australian Children's Television Foundation (ACTF) in association with The Disney Channel, and was written by Tony Morphett from a concept by Jeff Peck. Executive-produced by Patricia Edgar, it was directed by John Power, and produced by Anthony Buckley. The story was located and shot at NASA's Tidbinbilla Tracking Station, (now called the Canberra Deep Space Communication Complex). It starred American actress and Dynasty star Pamela Sue Martin (as Dr Spencer Jenkins), with Maia Brewton and Courtney Kieler (as her daughters Ali and Fiona); and Australian actor Paul Williams (as Dr Tony Masters) with Justin Rosniak (as his son, Mike). In the story, the scientists' kids uncover that a satellite will be crashing to earth nearby, and the children race to be the first ones to find it.

Filming was done April–May 1990, with post-production completed in September. The movie was first telecast in the USA on the Disney Channel on 27 May 1991. In Australia, the movie screened at the Melbourne International Film Festival, in June 1991. ACTF went ahead in producing a Sky Trackers series, without Disney's involvement, before the movie was broadcast in Australia.

On 11 March 1995, the weekend before Sky Trackers the series premiered, the movie was telecast in Australia on The Seven Network.

=== TV series ===
Sky Trackers the series grew from a request by the Commonwealth Scientific and Industrial Research Organisation (the CSIRO, Australia's federal science agency) to the director of the Australian Children's Television Foundation, Patricia Edgar, to create a children's television series that would help attract girls to seek a career in science. Created for the series was the character of Nikki Colbert, a 13-year old science fan who wants to be the first woman on Mars. Great care was taken with the scripts to have the science as accurate as possible. CSIRO staff had "a constant and vital role in the creation of Sky Trackers", making themselves "available as consultants throughout the development of the scripts, as did NASA"; and Dr Karl Kruszelnicki was also employed as a science advisor for the series.

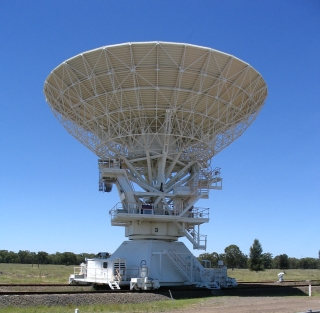
One of the telescope dishes of the Australia Telescope Compact Array, seen in orientation used for Sky Trackers episode "Skating the Dish"

Funding from the Australian Film Finance Corporation was secured on 29 July 1992, and pre-production began on 15 February 1993. Filming was set to take place at NASA's Tidbinbilla Tracking Station again, however Tidbinbilla station baulked at the episode 1 scene of roller-blading on a tracking dish, and so the entire shoot was relocated to the Australia Telescope Compact Array at the CSIRO's Australia Telescope National Facility outside Narrabri, in New South Wales, where the rollerblading scene was felt to be OK.

The series was shot over 28 weeks, initially on location at the Australia Telescope Compact Array, Narrabri – in the drama portrayed as the "Kaputar Tracking Station" – and then in studio in Melbourne, Australia, with further exterior shoots all around the state of Victoria. CSIRO reported filming commencing in June 1993, and Petra Yared recalls the whole shoot taking "9 months". Production was completed in 1994. ACTF entered the first episode "Skating the Dish" into the 1994 Australian Film Institute Awards (winners announced 4 November), and Sky Trackers won Best Children's Television Drama, and Zbych Trofimiuk received the Young Actor award.

The program was launched in Australia by The Hon Michael Lee, MP, Minister for Communications and the Arts, at the Planetarium, Museum of Victoria, on 20 February 1995. Also in attendance were Bob Campbell, Chief Executive of The Seven Network, representatives of NASA and CSIRO, Sky Trackers cast and crew members, Staff and Board Members of The Seven Network and the ACTF, and representatives of the media. The series began screening nationally on The Seven Network and its affiliate, Prime Television, each week across Australia from 19 March 1995.

Dr Tamara Jernigan, a NASA astronaut who has spent more than 800 hours in space and orbited the Earth more than 400 times, visited Australia at the invitation of the ACTF in June 1995 and made a four day tour of schools in Melbourne, Sydney, Adelaide and Brisbane. Travelling with her was Petra Yared, the 15-year-old star of Sky Trackers.

The series was digitally re-mastered on the 25th anniversary of its initial release.

== Reception ==
Australia's TV Week listings magazine welcomed the series with enthusiasm: "A massive satellite dish on which to go in-line skating, right there in the backyard? What more could a teenager want? A space tracking station where teens and even pre-teens have free rein to log in to the computer systems and such? Even better … just about approaching perfection, in fact. Welcome to the world of Sky Trackers, the latest effort from the trail-blazing Australian Children’s Television Foundation [...] The cast is excellent particularly the teenagers Petra Jared as science-crazy Nikki Colbert and Zbych Trofimiuk as Mike Masters, whose scientific interests range about as far as a Jimi Hendrix lick."

== Other media ==
=== Educational resources ===
The Australian Children's Television Foundation produced three Sky Trackers the series teaching packages for use in schools in the form of three Curriculum Packs:

- Sky Trackers: The Environment by Annemaree O'Brien and Noel Gough
  - covers environmental activists, waterways, human intervention and protecting your planet
- Sky Trackers: Space by Annemaree O'Brien and Noel Gough
  - covers rockets, space phenomena, radio telescopes and microwaves, SETI, science and culture, ethics and values.
- Sky Trackers: Family and Self by Don Edgar and Annemaree O'Brien
  - covers family relationships, grief, domestic violence, family breakups and adoption.

Each pack contained three Sky Trackers episodes on videotape, introduced by the young actors, with teacher's background notes on the topic and suggested questions and student activities aimed at upper primary and junior secondary school (years 5-8) classrooms. The featured episodes are a dramatic blend of stories about science, deep space, the environment and family life, which provide launch points to explore a range of issues, encouraging kids to ponder, debate, discuss, question and investigate further.

Today, the educational resources for the series are provided in a downloadable pdf from ACTF's website.

Sky Trackers episode-clips also feature in ACTF's publication What's Fair, by Val Catchpoole – an educational multi-media resource for teaching ethical inquiry in schools.

=== Novel ===
Penguin Books Australia published a tie-in novel based on the series, also titled Sky Trackers, written by Amanda Midlam.

=== Videotape ===
Sky Trackers the movie was released on video by Village Roadshow.

Sky Trackers the series was released on video by Reel Entertainment in nine volumes, with the first collection of episodes available to the public in June 1995.

=== Digital release ===
The series was released on DVD in 2007; and the series is available for download from the ACTF in 720p (4:3) upconverted HD.

== International broadcast ==
Sky Trackers the movie was sold to Showcase Television in Canada and EuroArts International Gmbh in Germany in 1996.

Sky Trackers the series has been sold to 105 countries. It performed particularly well in Europe where it was sold to ARD Germany, Danmarks Radio, NRK Norway, the Finnish Broadcasting Company, Slovak TV, RTSR Switzerland, AVRO in the Netherlands, and RTE Ireland who aired it from 28 August 1995. A contract with France 2 was also negotiated in 1995. In 1996, Telepiu, a pay television channel in Italy, acquired a one year window of the series, and Canal Plus Poland acquired a two year window.

The series has also been sold to the Philippines, Nigeria, Brazil, Turkey, Slovak Republic, Israel, Iceland, Cyprus, Arabic-speaking territories, Hong Kong, Mexico, Indonesia, Brunei, Malaysia, Taiwan and Sri Lanka; and to the Encore Media Corporation, for its WAM! teenage channel in the United States.

== Awards and nominations ==
| Year | Nominated work | Award Event | Category | Result | Reference |
|---|---|---|---|---|---|
| 1994 | 'Skating the dish' episode of Sky Trackers | Australian Film Institute (AFI) Awards, Melbourne, Australia | Best Children's Television Drama | Won | |
| 1994 | Zbych Trofimiuk for the role of Mike Masters | Australian Film Institute (AFI) Awards, Melbourne, Australia | Young Actor Award | Won | |
| 1994 | 'Skating the dish' episode of Sky Trackers | Banff Television Festival, Canada | Banff Rockie Award for Best Children's Program | Nominated | |
| 1994 | Sky Trackers series | Cairo International Film Festival for Children in Egypt | Golden Cairo for TV Programmes | Won | |
| 1995 | Sky Trackers series | Australian Teachers of Media (ATOM) Awards, Melbourne, Australia | Best Children's Television Series | Won | |
| 1995 | Sky Trackers series | Bavarian State Ministry for Education, Culture, Science and Art in Munich | International Competition of the MediaNet Awards | Selected | |
| 1996 | Sky Trackers series | Prix Jeunesse, Munich | Children's program, Age 7-12 | Finalist | |
