= AACTA Award for Best Young Actor =

Former Australian film award

Best Young Actor AACTA Award
- Country: Australia
- Presented by: Australian Academy of Cinema and Television Arts (AACTA)
- Formerly called: AFI Young Actors Award
- First award: 1991
- Currently held by: Lara Robinson, Cloudstreet (2011)
- Website: http://www.aacta.org

The AACTA Award for Best Young Actor is an award presented by the Australian Academy of Cinema and Television Arts (AACTA), a non-profit organisation whose aim is to "identify, award, promote and celebrate Australia's greatest achievements in film and television." The award is presented at the annual AACTA Awards, which hand out accolades for achievements in feature film, television, documentaries and short films. From 1991 to 2010, the category was presented by the Australian Film Institute (AFI), the Academy's parent organisation, at the annual Australian Film Institute Awards (known as the AFI Awards). When the AFI launched the Academy in 2011, it changed the annual ceremony to the AACTA Awards, with the current award being a continuum of the AFI Young Actors Award.

The award was first presented in 1991 as "Best Juvenile Performance". It was handed out as a special award from 1991 to 2001, before it became a competitive award from 2002, onwards. Additionally, a cash prize of A$20,000 was given to the winner from 2006 to 2008.

The award is presented at the discretion of the Academy, and is eligible to an actor or actress who is under the age of eighteen. It is given to an individual who has performed in a lead, supporting or guest role of television, feature film and short film categories.

== Winners and nominees ==
In the following table, the years listed correspond to the year of film release; the ceremonies are usually held the same year.^{[A]} The performer in bold and in dark blue background have received a special award; those in bold and in yellow background have won a regular competitive award. Those that are neither highlighted nor in bold are the nominees. When sorted chronologically, the table always lists the winning performer first and then the other nominees.

Winner of competitive award
Winner of special award

Year	Nominee	Program	Character(s)	Notes
**AFI Awards**
**1990s**
**1991** (33rd)	**Lauren Hewett**	**Act of Necessity**	**Samantha**	Television film
**1992** (34th)	**Alexander Outhred**	**Hammers Over the Anvil**	**Alan Marshall**	Feature film
**1993** (35th)	**Lauren Hewett**	**Halfway Across the Galaxy and Turn Left**	**X**	Television series
**1993** (35th)	**Robert Joamie**	**Map of the Human Heart**	**Young Avik**	Feature film
**1994** (36th)	**Zbych Trofimiuk**	**Sky Trackers**	**Mike Masters**	Television series
**1995** (37th)	**Jamie Croft**	**That Eye, the Sky**	**Morton 'Ort' Flack**	Feature film
**1996** (38th)	**Petra Yared**	**Mirror, Mirror**	**Jo Tiegan**	Television series
**1997** (39th)	**Jeffrey Walker**	**The Wayne Manifesto**	**Wayne Wilson**	Television series
**1998** (40th)	**Paul Pantano**	**Water Rats**	**Max Ryde**	Television series
**1999** (41st)	**Abbie Cornish**	**Wildside**	**Simone Summers**	Television series
**2000s**
**2000** (42nd)	**Kane McNay**	**Mallboy**	**Shaun**	Feature film
2000 (42nd)	Xaris Miller	Eugénie Sandler P.I.	Eugénie Sandler	Television series
**2001** (43rd)	**John Sebastian Pilakui**	**Yolngu Boy**	**Lorrpu**	Feature film
2001 (43rd)	Joshua Jay	All Saints	Zac Stockwell	Television series
**2002** (44th)	**Emily Browning**	**Halifax f.p.**	**Kristy O'Connor**	Television film
2002 (44th)	Luke O'Loughlin	Escape of the Artful Dodger	Dodger	Television series
2002 (44th)	Everlyn Sampi	Rabbit-Proof Fence	Molly Craig	Feature film
**2003** (45th)	**Liam Hess**	**Don't Blame the Koalas**	**Greg King**	Television series
2003 (45th)	Emily Browning	After the Deluge	Maddy	Television film
2003 (45th)	Mason Richardson	Teesh and Trude	Kenny	Feature film
**2004** (46th)	**Natasha Wanganeen**	**Jessica**	**Mary Simpson**	Television miniseries
2004 (46th)	Richard Wilson	Out There	Miller McKee	Television series
2004 (46th)	Sarah Vongmany	Comedy Inc: The Late Shift	Sophie	Docudrama
2004 (46th)	Jarryd Jinks	Tom White	Jet	Feature film
**2005** (47th)	**Sophie Luck**	**Blue Water High**	**Fiona "Fly" Watson**	Television series
2005 (47th)	Maddi Newling	Danya	Danya	Short film
2005 (47th)	Brittany Byrnes	Little Oberon	Natasha Green	Television film
2005 (47th)	Joanna Hunt-Prokhovnik	Three Dollars	Various	Abby Harnovey
**2006** (48th)	**Marny Kennedy**	**Mortified**	**Taylor Fry**	Television series
2006 (48th)	Frank Sweet	2:37	Marcus	Feature film
2006 (48th)	Christian Byers	Opal Dream	Ashmol Williamson	Feature film
2006 (48th)	Mia Wasikowska	Suburban Mayhem	Lilya	Feature film
**2007** (49th)	**Kodi Smit-McPhee**	**Romulus, My Father**	**Raimond**	Feature film
2007 (49th)	Sean Keenan	Lockie Leonard	Phillip	Television series
2007 (49th)	Irene Chen	The Home Song Stories	May	Feature film
2007 (49th)	Joel Lok	The Home Song Stories	Tom	Feature film
**2008** (50th)	**Danielle Catanzariti**	**Hey Hey It's Esther Blueburger**	**Esther Blueburger**	Feature film
2008 (50th)	Saoirse Ronan	Death Defying Acts	Benji McGarvie	Feature film
2008 (50th)	Clarence John Ryan	Sep	Paddy Parker	Feature film
2008 (50th)	Tom Green	The Ground Beneath	Kaden	Short film
**2009** (51st)	**Marissa Gibson**	**Samson and Delilah**	**Delilah**	Feature film
**2009** (51st)	**Rowan McNamara**	**Samson and Delilah**	**Samson**	Feature film
2009 (51st)	Brandon Walters	Australia	Nullah	Feature film
2009 (51st)	Sebastian Gregory	Beautiful	Danny	Feature film
2009 (51st)	Tom Russell	Last Ride	Chook	Feature film
2009 (51st)	Toby Wallace	Lucky Country	Tom	Feature film
**2010s**
**2010** (52nd)	**Harrison Gilbertson**	**Beneath Hill 60**	**Frank Tiffin**	Feature film
2010 (52nd)	Ashleigh Cummings	Tomorrow, When the War Began	Robyn Mathers	Feature film
2010 (52nd)	Morgana Davies	The Tree	Simone	Feature film
2010 (52nd)	James Frecheville	Animal Kingdom	Joshua "J" Cody	Feature film
**AACTA Awards**
**2011** (1st)	**Lara Robinson**	**Cloudstreet**	**Young Rose Pickles**	Television miniseries
2011 (1st)	Olivia DeJonge	Good Pretender	Ally	Short film
2011 (1st)	Emma Jefferson	My Place	Johanna	Television series
2011 (1st)	Lucas Yeeda	Mad Bastards	Bullet	Feature film

== Notes ==
A: From 1958 to 2010, the awards were held during the year of the films release. However, the 1974–75 awards were held in 1975 for films released in 1974 and 1975, and the first AACTA Awards were held in 2012 for films released in 2011.

== See also ==
- AACTA Awards
- Australian Film Institute
