= Czocha Castle =

Castle in southwest Poland

- Zamek Czocha
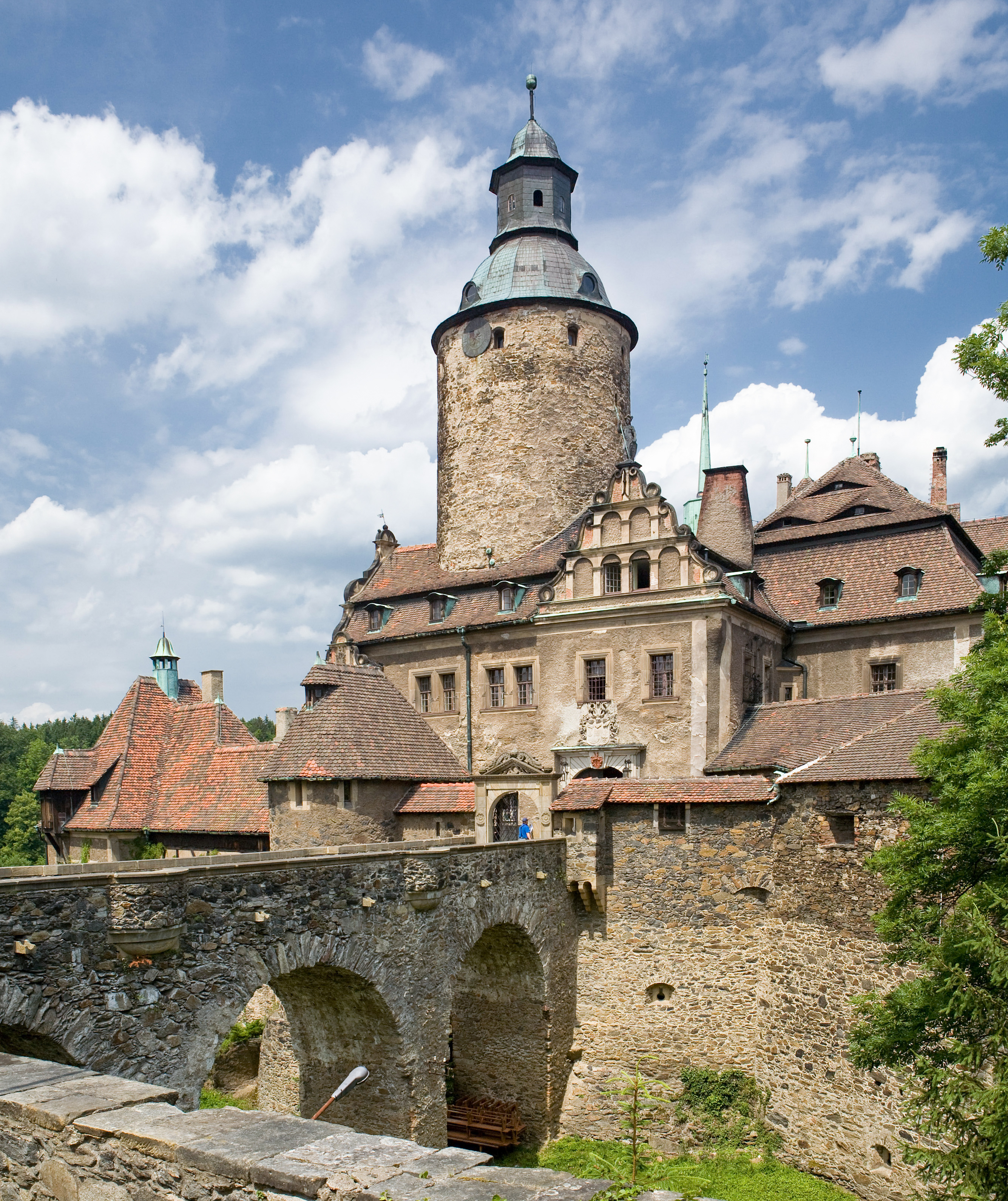
- The main part of the Castle

- Location within Poland Location within Lower Silesian Voivodeship

General information
- Location: Sucha, Poland, Poland
- Coordinates: 51°1′50″N 15°18′13″E
- Construction started: 13th century
- Completed: 14th century
- Owner: Ernst Freiherr von Gütschow; Polish Army; Hotel Group WAM (last owner)

Website
- Official Website

Czocha Castle (Polish pronunciation: [ˈt͡ʂɔxa], German: Tzschocha, Czech: Čocha, Latin: Caychow) is a defensive castle in the village of Sucha (Gmina Lesna), Lubań County, Lower Silesian Voivodeship, in southwestern Poland. The castle is located on Lake Leśnia, near the Kwisa river, in what is now the Polish part of Upper Lusatia. Czocha castle was built on gneiss rock, and its oldest part is the keep, to which housing structures were later added.

== History ==
Map of Czocha Castle (1714)

Czocha Castle began as a stronghold, on the Bohemian-Lusatian border. Its construction was ordered by Wenceslaus I of Bohemia, in the middle of the 13th century (1241–1247). In 1253 castle was handed over to Konrad von Wallhausen, Bishop of Meissen. In 1319 the complex became part of the dukedom of Henry I of Jawor. After his death, it was taken over by another Silesian prince, Bolko II the Small, and his wife Agnes (see Duchy of Silesia). The origin of the stone castle dates back to 1329.

In the mid-14th century, Czocha Castle was annexed by Charles IV, Holy Roman Emperor and King of Bohemia. Then, between 1389 and 1453, it belonged to the noble families of von Dohna and von Kluks. Reinforced, the complex was besieged by the Hussites in the early 15th century, who captured it in 1427, and remained in the castle for unknown time (see Hussite Wars). In 1453, the castle was purchased by the Nostitz family, who owned it for 250 years, making several changes through remodelling projects in 1525 and 1611. Czocha's walls were strengthened and reinforced, which thwarted a Swedish siege of the complex during the Thirty Years War. In 1703, the castle was purchased by Jan Hartwig von Uechtritz, influential courtier of Augustus II the Strong. On August 17, 1793, the whole complex burned in a fire.

In 1909, Czocha was bought by a cigar manufacturer from Dresden, Ernst Gutschow, who ordered major remodelling, carried out by Berlin architect Bodo Ebhardt, based on a 1703 painting of the castle. Gutschow, who was close to the Russian Imperial Court and hosted several White emigres in Czocha, lived in the castle until March 1945. Upon leaving, he packed up the most valuable possessions and moved them out.

After World War II, the castle was ransacked several times, both by soldiers of the Red Army, and Polish thieves, who came to the so-called Recovered Territories from central and eastern part of the country. Pieces of furniture and other goods were stolen, and in the late 1940s and early 1950s, the castle was home to refugees from Greece (see Greek Civil War). In 1952, Czocha was taken over by the Polish Army. Used as a military vacation resort, it was erased from official maps. The castle has been open to the public since September 1996 as a hotel and conference centre.

The complex was featured in several movies and television series, including a popular 1963 comedy, Gdzie jest generał? (Where is the General?), Legenda, The Hexer (film), The Hexer (TV series), Beyond Sherwood Forest, Spellbinder, The Secret of the Cipher Fortress and First Love.

In 2012, the castle was voted as one of the "New Seven Wonders of Poland" in an annual National Geographic Poland plebiscite.

Since 2014 the castle has also been used as a setting for College of Wizardry, a live action role-playing game (LARP) that takes place in their own universe and can be compared to Harry Potter. There was a hiatus in 2019 after ongoing issues within its founding organization threatened to end the series. However, a crowdfunding action saved the LARP and a new organizing team has continued organizing events at the castle. It has also been used as the site for the EU4 Grandest Lan 2023 event, officially hosted by Paradox Interactive.

== In the media ==
Czocha Castle was featured on the Discovery Channel's TV series Expedition Unknown in the season 15 episode, "Hitler's Amerikabomber".

== Gallery ==
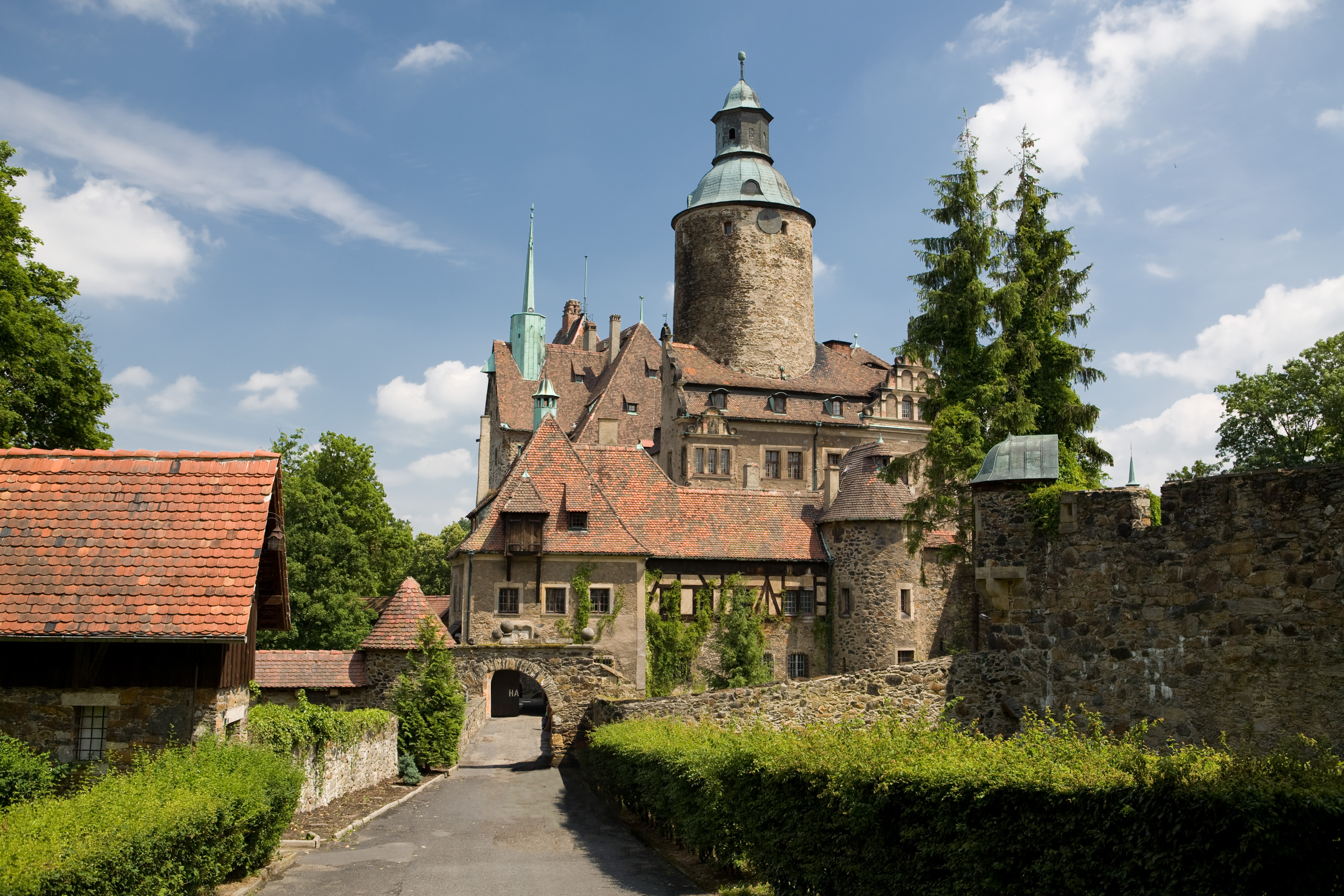
Overview of the castle

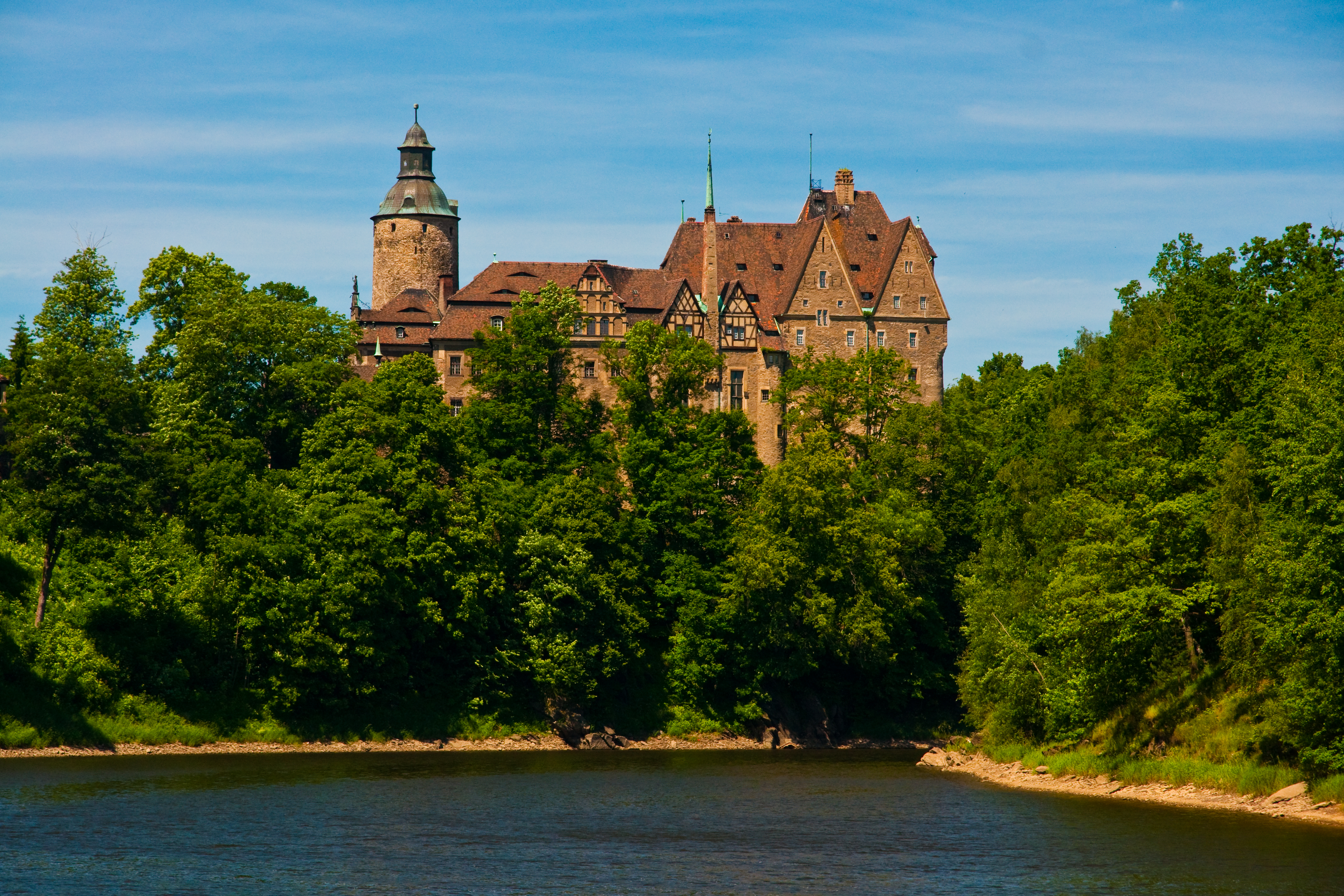
Czocha Castle, view from the Kwisa river

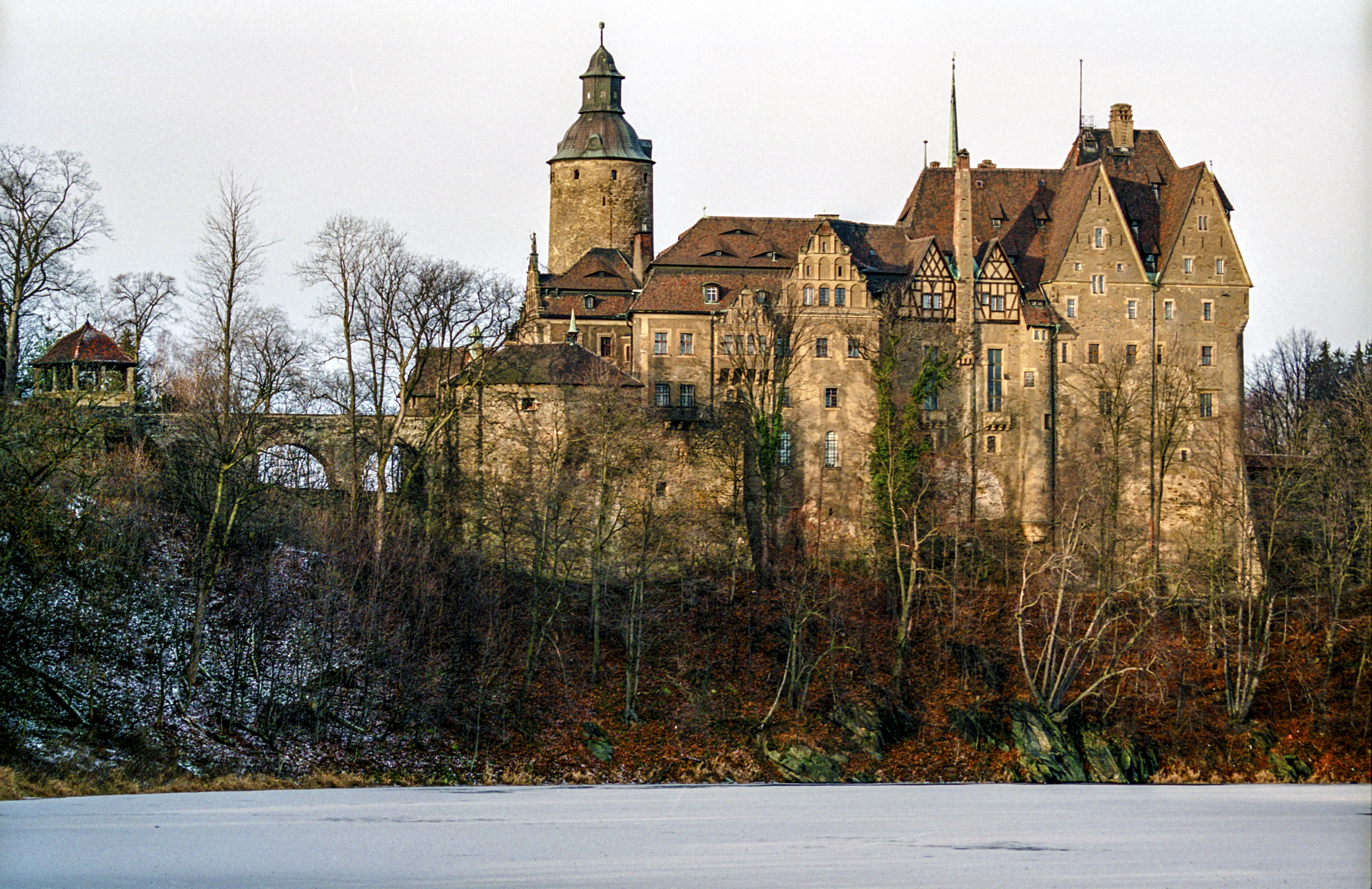
The castle in winter

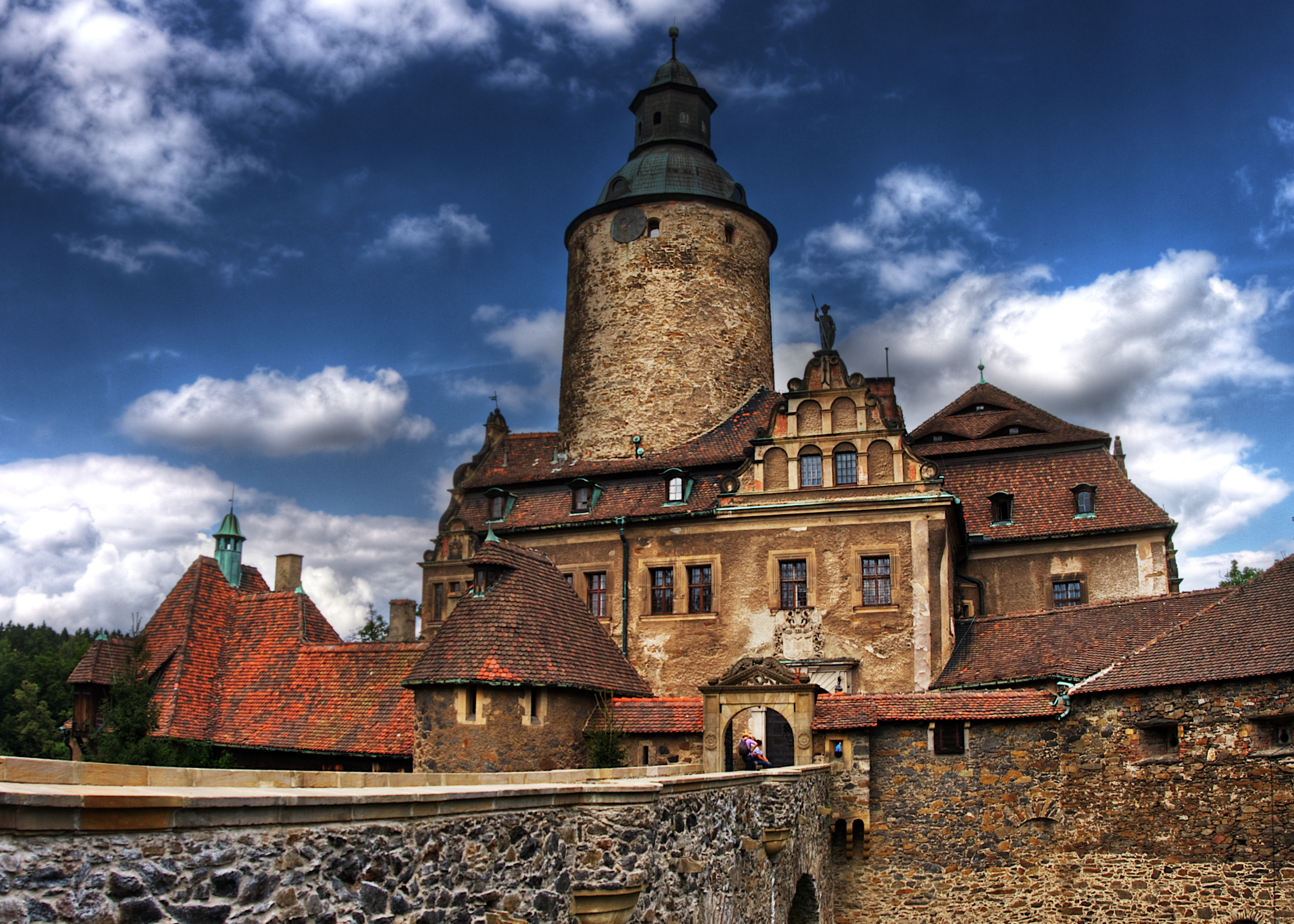
Front view

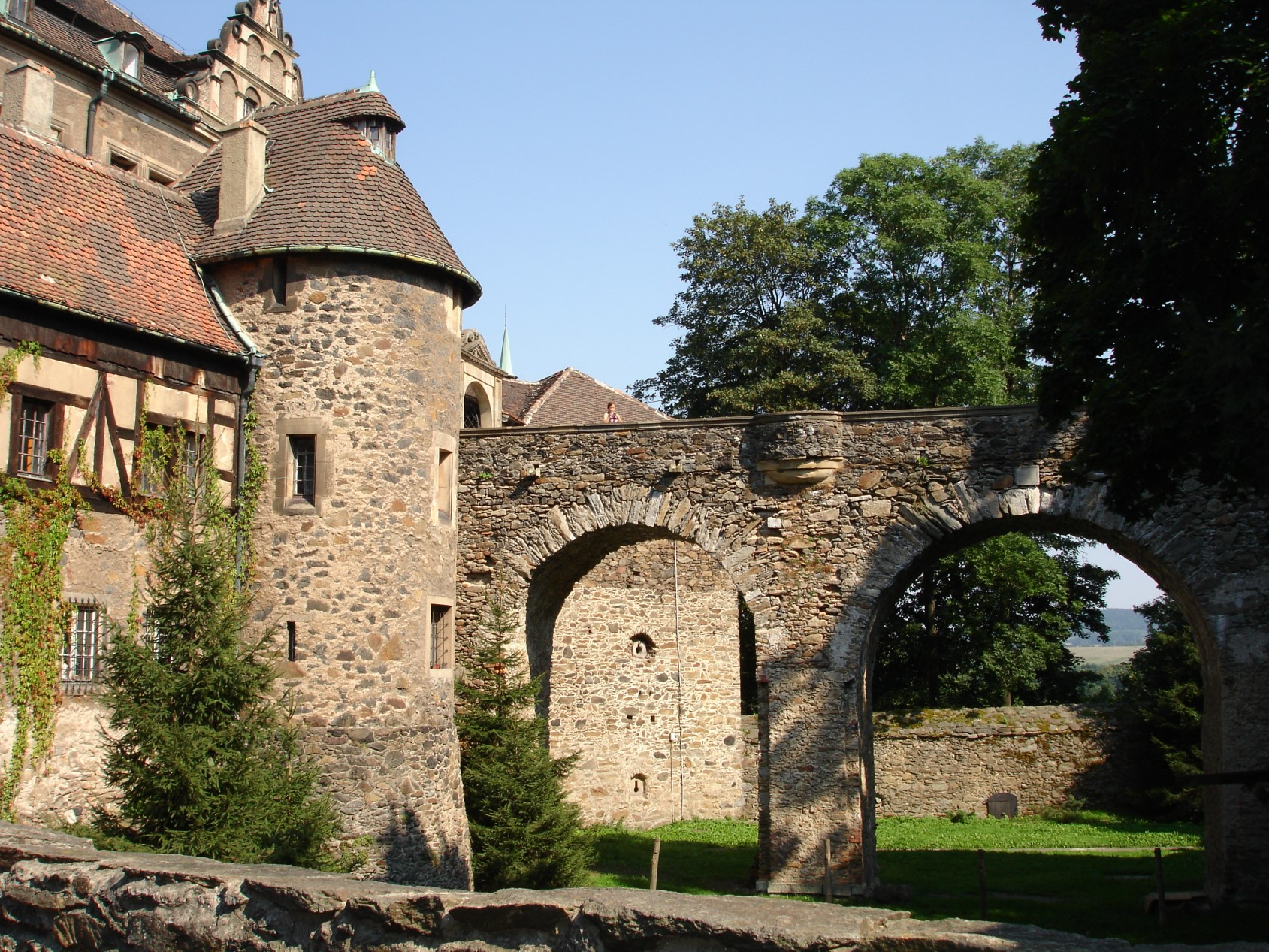
The bridge

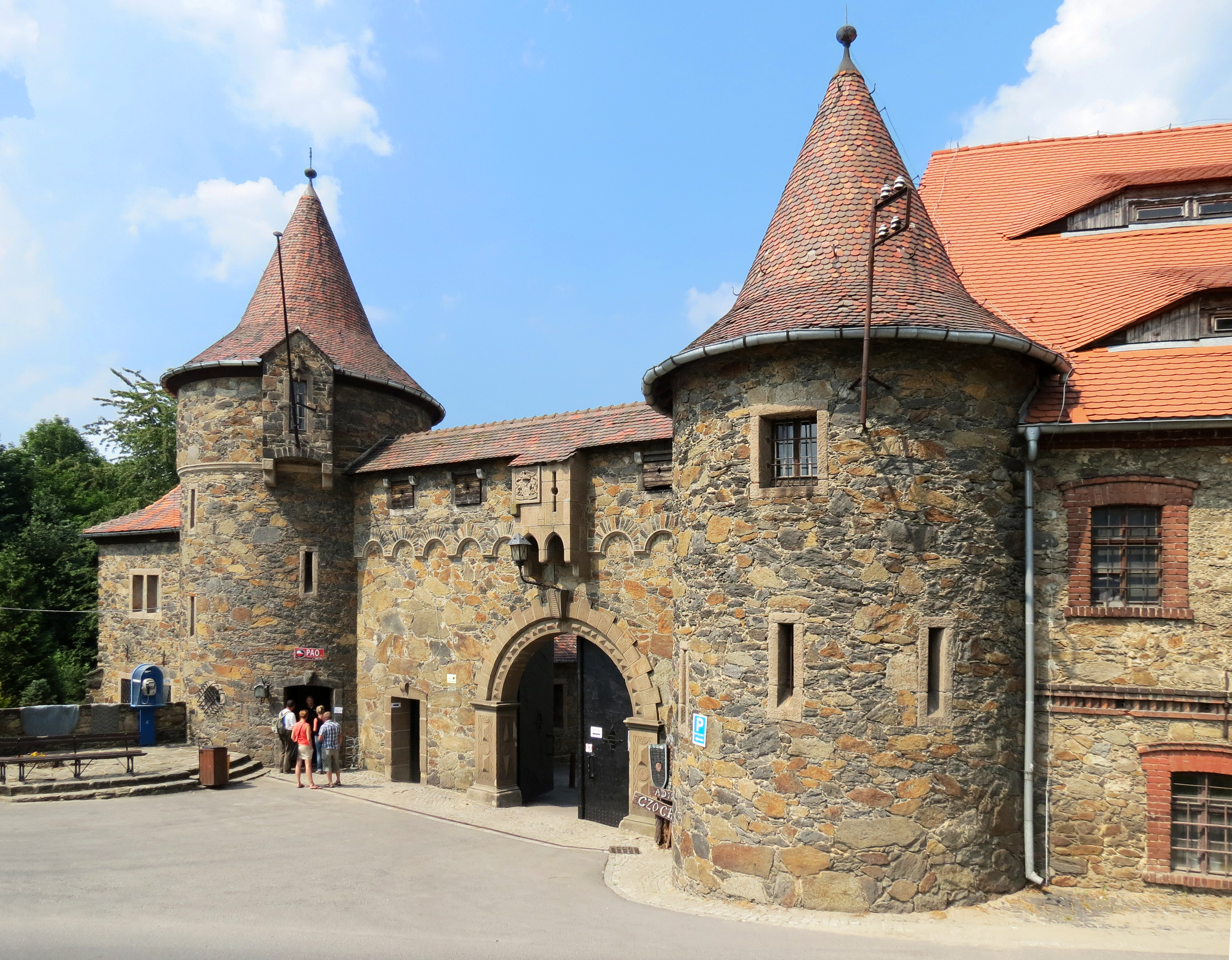
The gate to the castle

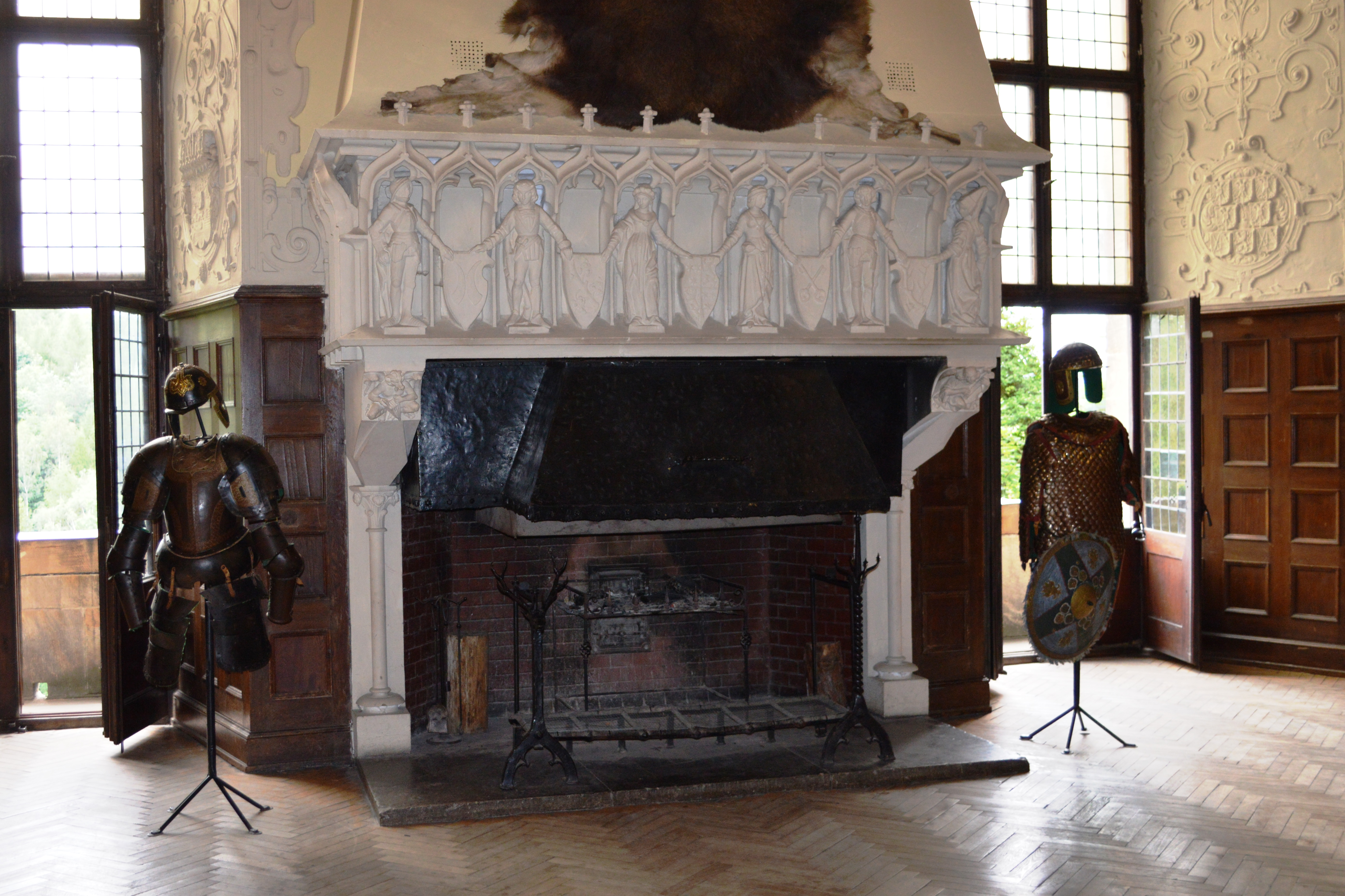
Interior

== See also ==
- List of castles in Poland
