= Spellbinder (TV series) =

1995 fantasy adventure television series

- Spellbinder intertitle
- Genre: Adventure, Fantasy, Science fiction
- Created by: Mark Shirrefs; John Thomson
- Written by: Mark Shirrefs; John Thomson
- Directed by: Noel Price
- Starring: Zbych Trofimiuk; Gosia Piotrowska; Brian Rooney; Michela Noonan; Heather Mitchell; Andrew McFarlane; Krzysztof Kumor; Rafał Zwierz
- Composer: Ian Davidson
- Countries of origin: Australia; Poland
- Original languages: English; Polish
- No. of series: 1
- No. of episodes: 26

Production
- Executive producers: Ron Saunders; Kris Noble; Andrzej Stempowski
- Producer: Noel Price
- Cinematography: Danny Batterham; Martin McGrath; Geoff Burton
- Editor: Pippa Anderson
- Running time: 24–25 minutes
- Production companies: Telewizja Polska; Film Australia

Original release
- Network: Nine Network (Australia); TVP2 (Poland)
- Release: 9 January – 4 July 1995

Related
- Spellbinder: Land of the Dragon Lord (1997)

Spellbinder (Polish: Dwa światy, lit. 'Two worlds') is a 1995 English-language fantasy adventure science fiction children's television series, co-produced between Australia and Poland, and filmed in both countries. The series follows the adventures of Sydney high-schooler Paul Reynolds (Zbych Trofimiuk) as he is accidentally stranded in a parallel world where the industrial revolution never happened. Only a small number of people there have technology – the "Spellbinders" – and they pretend it is magic and use it to rule over everyone else, manipulating people's fear and ignorance. Paul, with the help of a local girl called Riana (Gosia Piotrowska), uses his wits and his own knowledge of science to survive, whilst his high-school friends try to rescue him.

The series has 26 episodes of 30 minutes each, and was produced by Film Australia and Telewizja Polska, in association with the Australian Children's Television Foundation (ACTF), who provide accompanying educational material for the series.

Spellbinder was shot on location in Australia (Sydney, and the Blue Mountains), and in Poland where most scenes of the parallel world were filmed in Kraków-Częstochowa Upland, Ogrodzieniec, Zawiercie, Czocha Castle, and Książ. Czocha Castle was used as the Spellbinder's castle with Książ Castle serving for certain interior shots. The ruins of Ogrodzieniec Castle were used as the ruins of the Old Spellbinder's castle.

Spellbinder won the Australian Film Institute's Award for Best Children's Television Drama in 1996. The series was also novelised by the creators, Mark Shirrefs and John Thomson, as Spellbinder Book 1: Riana's World and Spellbinder Book 2: Paul's World.

Spellbinder was followed by a second series, called Spellbinder: Land of the Dragon Lord, in which Heather Mitchell and Rafał Zwierz reprised their roles as the Spellbinder Ashka and her apprentice Gryvon respectively.

== Synopsis ==
A group of teenagers go on a school camp in the Blue Mountains in Australia. While at the camp, Paul Reynolds accidentally goes into a parallel universe. This other world is inhabited by a more hierarchical and technologically different society, ruled by a group of people known as Spellbinders. Paul meets a girl there named Riana, and they become friends.

The Spellbinders have discovered the power to create and manipulate static electricity. They fly in gigantic copper-coloured machines that utilise large rotating orange crystals, presumably creating some form of magnetic levitation. The Spellbinders often use their power for good, but some abuse this power and use their discoveries for malevolence. One such malevolent Spellbinder is Ashka, who often manages to hide her true nature. Common people are often "banished" for their misdeeds, and sometimes Spellbinders are banished, also, if they are proven to have done wrong.

There is tension from Paul's forays into the land of the Spellbinders and his attempts to return to his own universe, and also from conversations Paul has with his friends across the barrier between the two universes. Paul and Riana's escapes also add tension, as do the interactions between Spellbinders.

Paul is eventually able to travel back home, but he is forced to take Riana with him in order to save her. Later, when Paul is able to take Riana back home, the Spellbinder Ashka follows Paul as he later returns home. Ashka seeks the unwitting help of Paul's father in making her a new high-tech 'flying suit' to replace her power suit in order to make her more powerful than the other Spellbinders.

However, Paul manages to expose her scheme and defeat Ashka, who is returned as an outcast to the Spellbinder world, while Riana becomes the new apprentice to Correon. In order to keep the Spellbinder world safe from the more advanced people from "modern" world, the gateway between the two universes is closed permanently.

== Cast and characters ==
=== Main ===
- Zbych Trofimiuk as Paul Reynolds – a teenage boy from Sydney, New South Wales, Australia. His life was normal until a prank at a camp went wrong and he ended up in the land of the Spellbinders. At first, Paul was unsure of how to react to the new world, but he settled in quite quickly and was able to discover Ashka's plot to rule the Spellbinders. Paul has some rough military skills, which, combined with the scientific knowledge from his father, makes him able to defeat Ashka.
- Gosia Piotrowska as Riana – she lives in the Spellbinder world. Her life was normal until the arrival of Paul. Despite getting off to a somewhat rocky start (Paul being mistaken for a Marauder), Riana realises that Paul is not a Marauder after he rescues her from drowning in a river and returns her belongings. Riana quickly becomes Paul's friend. She has very good survival skills and can use bolas and a spear. Riana cares very much for her family and is upset when she realises that they may be in danger. In Paul's world, Riana is able to use some of her survival skills to help a newfound friend, and is known as "Paul's cousin from Iceland". Due to her role in Ashka's defeat, Correon rewards Riana by making her his apprentice.
- Brian Rooney as Alex Katsonis – Paul's best friend who knows the truth about what happened to Paul and tries his best to bring him back. In the course of the series, he also develops a relationship with his classmate Katrina, even though they are basically as opposite as they can be. Alex has an older brother, who is a mechanic but gets fired for unspecified reasons.
- Michela Noonan as Katrina Muggleton – brought up by strict parents, Katrina is academically smart at school but has tendencies of naivete. Believing that the Mount Lara lights do exist, she travels up to the cave and is the only other person to both see and believe Paul's disappearance. She realises that the radios can be used to communicate and is able to succeed in helping to bring Paul home. In the second half of the season, Katrina becomes a friend to Riana, taking her shopping and introducing her to the trends of fashion. However, Katrina is easily tricked by Ashka into helping her.
- Heather Mitchell as Ashka – a Spellbinder. She mistakes Paul for a Marauder at first, throwing a power bolt at him, then, she realises, much to her surprise, that he is unaffected (the rubber soles of his sneakers insulated him) and chases after him. When she meets Paul at the castle and learns about fireworks, she blackmails Paul into giving her the secret of gunpowder, by holding the life of Riana and her family over his head. Paul tricks her twice and Ashka winds up in Paul's world. In Paul's world, Ashka is unfamiliar with all the new sights and sounds and this proves to be a slight disadvantage; however, she winds up working with Paul's father and creating a new power suit to take over the Spellbinder world. Ashka is ruthless and intimidating, and has the ability to create lies on the spot. Ashka misuses her power and authority for her own gain, and this leads to her downfall.
- Andrew McFarlane as Brian Reynolds – Paul's spunk father. A scientist, Brian is usually more wrapped up in his work than his family, but eventually settles down. He refuses to believe that Paul is in another world. Even after Paul returns home, Brian instead believes his son is suffering a trauma. A single father, he shows a romantic interest in Ashka, not realising she is a Spellbinder or that she plans to overthrow the Regents. He helps her create a new power suit. He realises Paul has been telling the truth when he meets Riana and opens his eyes to Ashka's true nature after she threatens Paul. When he realises his mistake, however, his knowledge helps bring Ashka down.
- Krzysztof Kumor as Correon – a Spellbinder and senior Regent. His studies are on how to repair flying ships and power suits. At first, he does not believe Paul and his claims about where he comes from. When he meets Riana, however, and she shows him the technology from Paul's world via his camcorder, Correon realises that Paul is telling the truth and teams up with Paul and Riana to get Paul home. He calls Ashka a liar and is challenged by her, but he loses (because Ashka, desperate to get rid of Correon, cheated by having Gryvon sabotage his power suit.) and is stripped of his position and sent to the Wastelands where he is rescued by Zander (a supposed Marauder). Correon also reveals Ashka's true nature to the Regents, by showing them Paul's camera, which shows them Ashka's actual motives. Correon is then reinstated as Spellbinder and senior Regent. He also is the one who introduces the Regents to a "Marauder" and plays a part in Ashka's downfall in the Spellbinder world.
- Rafał Zwierz as Gryvon – Ashka's apprentice. The son of the Clayhill Summoner and Ashka's co-conspirator, Gryvon is selfish and sycophantic, and follows Ashka's orders to the full. He is stripped of his apprenticeship after Ashka escapes and is punished by having to help repair Riana's family cottage, which was burnt by Ashka. Despite the fact he is no longer an apprentice, he still assists Ashka in her plans, but in the end he is exiled just like her.

=== Recurring ===
- Joachim Lamża as Lukan, Spellbinder Regent
- Hanna Dunowska as Marna, Spellbinder Regent
- Piotr Adamczyk as Zander, a native boy of the Spellbinder world who is banished for making a flying toy (with Paul's help), he later becomes a Marauder. He is the first of the Marauders to discover that the old Spellbinders were responsible for the Darkness and not the Marauders. Correon introduces him to the Regents as a real Marauder. He is impressed by Paul's scientific knowledge on flight.
- Julia Biczysko as Arla, Riana's younger sister
- Stanislaw Brejdygant as the Clayhill Summoner. He is Gryvon's father and is in charge of keeping things order in Clayhill (the village where Riana and her family live). When Paul arrives in the Land of the Spellbinders, he is the first person Paul meets. The Summoner mistakes Paul for a Marauder, and Paul accidentally steals his eyestone. He is unaware of Gryvon helping Ashka in her plan to rule the Spellbinders, and is shocked when she threatens to burn his village.
- Erland Buchan as Jal, Riana's younger brother
- Georgina Fisher as Christine Reynolds, Paul's younger sister, who helps keep Riana secret. Christine often expresses the wish for a mother and tries to match-make with her father and her baby-sitter, Gina.
- Andrzej Grabarczyk as Bron, Riana's father. He lies to the Summoner that Paul is his nephew.
- Sława Michalewska as Maran, Riana's mother. She does not trust Paul at first (having him sleep in the barn), but she eventually trusts him after he saves Jal from drowning via CPR. After Paul steals a power suit from the castle, Maran allows the Summoner to detain him. However, after hearing of Ashka's plans for her family, Maran has a change of heart and helps Paul escape by drugging the Summoner and his men with a sleeping drug she slipped into their tea.
- Judy Morris as Mrs. Muggleton, Katrina's mother, she is strict and overprotective of her daughter. In the series finale, she realises that Katrina and Alex have been telling the truth, and apologises to the both of them for not believing them.
- Christian Mcveigh as Mac, Spellbinder Regent
- Piotr Makowski as Kurn, leader of the Marauders
- Lenka Kripac as Josie
- Nina Liu as Lisa
- Laurence Breuls as Smithy
- Peter Sumner as Mr Kennett

== The Spellbinder's world ==
=== Conceptualization ===
The Spellbinder World was conceptualized as a speculative exercise of what might occur if a teenager was transported to a world in which the Industrial Revolution did not happen. To create a sense of mystery, series creators Mark Shirrefs and John Thomson, "came up with the idea of the Spellbinders who kept control of their world by controlling knowledge". They decided that the Spellbinder world was undergoing a partially self-inflicted dark age following a civilizational collapse triggered by a manmade ecological disaster. Series creators specify that the

Spellbinders decision to control knowledge was because this world had almost been destroyed hundreds of years earlier by massive experiments with electromagnetism - like the dangers we face with nuclear power, and they feared that if knowledge got out of control, it would happen again. Of course, this also meant that they led privileged lives and privilege is hard to give up.

The people Paul encounters in this world belong to a medieval-like society ruled by a group of magician-knights known as Spellbinders, who use ancient high-technology to rule over an ignorant serf population on the remaining inhabitable territory.

=== History ===
Very little is revealed about the history of the Spellbinder's world. At some point in the distant past, a disaster befell the planet, leaving their land surrounded by a wasteland where nothing can survive. They refer to this disaster as "the Darkness," and the ancestors of a group called the Marauders (raiders who live on the outskirts of their society, bordering on the wastelands) are blamed for the past catastrophe. Ancient Spellbinders were the ones actually responsible for the disaster, brought about by their own intellectual arrogance and desire for increasingly powerful weapons. Paul, the visitor from our world, speculates that "the Darkness" may have been the result of a nuclear winter, although this is not further elaborated upon. Regent Correon, with Paul's help, discovers an ancient book that describes an experiment of the ancient Spellbinders that went horribly wrong, but this book is destroyed by Ashka before more can be learned.

The Spellbinder world appears to have entered technological stagnation following the disaster. The spellbinders rely and appear to understand some of their ancient technology; however, their everyday lives were relatively simple by the standards of Paul's world.

Paul's visit may have changed the balance of power in the Spellbinder world. Regent Correon invites Riana to be his new apprentice, and Ashka and Gryvon are punished by being sent to a labour camp (as seen in Spellbinder: Land of the Dragon Lord) for their abuse of power. Although Correon was previously only interested in rediscovering the secrets of the Ancient Spellbinders, he now seems sympathetic to the problems of the people outside his castle, even deciding to share the Spellbinder's knowledge with everyone outside the castle. The rigid hierarchy that defines the Spellbinder society may therefore be weakening, as Correon believes that 'things must change around here'. However, Paul decides that future contact between the two worlds should be avoided in order to prevent Riana's world from being exploited by his own. The Spellbinder's control least 10 settlements like Clayhill. They have two castles, one ruined in "the Darkness."

=== Geography ===
There is limited information about the geography of the broader Spellbinder World. The country overseen by the Spellbinders is relatively small, comprising an approximate area of 20,000 kilometres bordered by a vast, desert called the wasteland. The territory seems to have a largely continental climate, mostly forested with some mountains with some land dedicated to agriculture.

=== Government and politics ===
The Spellbinder World is a feudalistic, authoritarian oligarchic technocracy, in which an elite group of technical experts, known as spellbinders rule over a technologically illiterate peasant population. The Spellbinders are, in turn, overseen by a committee of three Regents who reside in the Spellbinder castle. The regents appear to have absolute power, though they are subject to a Spellbinder Code and some rule of law.

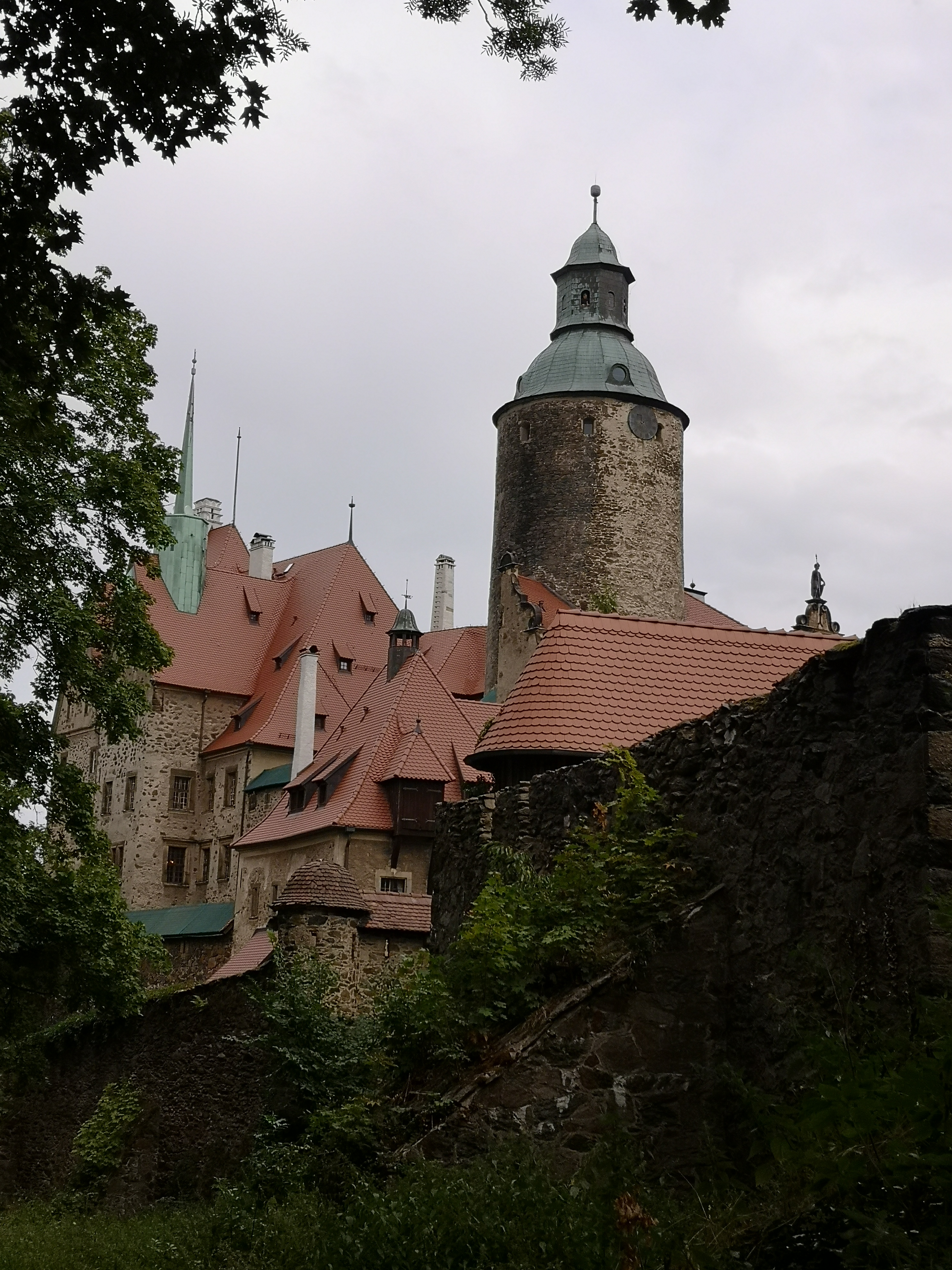
The Spellbinders Rule from a Castle. The Czocha Castle in Poland was used for exterior shots.

The Regents are indifferent to the plight of the people outside their castle, enforce a rigid code of laws designed to protect their hegemony. They banish anyone who discovers or applies the principles of science. The basis of their power over the people is their technology, and they are ruthless in their desire to prevent anyone else from understanding it.

The Spellbinders are beset with internal conflict due to the deterioration of their technology. Because there are only a limited number of power suits and flying ships still in operation, only a select few can be Spellbinders at any given time. At one point, a major dispute is legally settled by a ritualised duel in which Spellbinders fire power bolts at each other; such duels were noted to be somewhat archaic, however. The loser of such a match is stripped of their Spellbinder status and exiled to the wastelands to die. The same punishment is also given to anyone who violates the law against engineering.

The period following "the Darkness" appears to have been a period of extended peace. There do not seem to be any other political entities in competition with the Spellbinders for authority. In fact, conflict was so uncommon that people in the spellbinder world considered the concept of war completely alien, with one person asking Paul "what is a war?"

There are two known factions in the Spellbinder world. In addition to the Spellbinders and their subjects, there is a group of raiders known as the Marauders. People who are banished to the wastelands are sometimes saved by, and then join the Marauders. It is unclear what the Spellbinders knew about the Marauders, prior to the events of Spellbinder. It seems that the Spellbinders considered the Marauders a powerful faction, with unknown technology, operating out of the wasteland. The Spellbinders also believed the Marauders were responsible for the events that lead to the "Darkness." In reality, the Marauders were a collection of banished subjects who settled in a complex rock formation known as the Labyrinth.

=== Society ===
The Spellbinder World has a different class system than medieval societies in Paul's Dimension. The Spellbinder world appears to operate according to a largely manorialistic system of land ownership. Pesants work the land and pay tribute to the Spellbinders.

The Spellbinders play an analogous roles to knights. Spellbinders take on squires, known as apprentices, who are given more privilege and respect than non-spellbinders. Apprentices learn all the secrets of the Spellbinder world and have to swear an oath to secrecy. If they break the oath, they are banished. However, they appear not to be given the hidden knowledge or access to a power suit until they are elevated to the rank of spellbinder, or if a spellbinder dies. Spellbinders and Apprentices are differentiated from the rest of society by their red and white tunics.

Villages appear to be administered by a local bailiff known as a Summoner. Summoners were permitted to use some spellbinder technology apparently to communicate with the Spellbinders. They were the only people, aside from Spellbinders, permitted to use eyestones or to approach summoning towers. This seemed to be a highly esteemed role, with Summoners taking on a somewhat higher social status than other non-spellbinders. Summoners are also responsible for recommending candidates for apprenticing. While exceptionally bright non-spellbinders are taken on as apprentices there is some degree of nepotism involved in the process though, as Gryvon is clearly only chosen to be an apprentice because his father is the Summoner of Clayhill.

Non-spellbinders who work in the castle as servants and guards are also distinguished by their uniforms. While it is said that working in the castle is a high honour, it is unclear whether servants get any additional privileges and based on Ashka's behaviour with them, it is acceptable for Spellbinders to abuse them.

=== Economy ===
The economy of the spellbinder world appears to be largely agrarian. The Spellbinders actively discourage innovation of any kind, forbidding even rudimentary engineering. Consequently, there is no industry to speak of. They do not seem to have any monetary system and operate a barter economy, called “swapping”. Members of the different villages meet regularly at a market in Rivertown.

=== Science and culture ===
The Spellbinder society appears to have diverged from Paul's world, for two reasons. Firstly, the Spellbinders strictly control any knowledge they consider dangerous and forbid engineering and technology use by non-spellbinders. Second, the Spellbinder world has a unique resource known as power stones. Power stones are a kind of naturally occurring capacitor that are able of holding a large electrical charge. Experimentation with these stones seems to have allowed Spellbinders to develop sophisticated knowledge of electromagnetism, without the energy generating infrastructure necessary in Paul's world. Consequently, they do not seem to have undergone the same trajectory of technological development that occurred in Paul's world. They do not seem to have any knowledge of steam power or combustion, though the existence of flying ships and summoning towers would suggest they have some facility with industrial metallurgy.

As a result, the Spellbinder world seems to have developed high technology without undergoing the same Industrial Revolution that occurred in Paul's world. These had widespread effects on the Spellbinder World. Without combustion and with the aid of early flight, the Spellbinder world did not develop roads or other travel infrastructure. There do not seem to be any roads in the Spellbinder world and Riana considers roads a completely foreign concept. The Spellbinders also appear to have no knowledge of indoor plumbing, with their baths being filled manually, and Ashka asking Paul's father "where's the outhouse." The Spellbinders also have no knowledge of gunpowder.

By contrast, the Spellbinders have sophisticated knowledge of electrical engineering and electromagnetism. Spellbinders developed electromagnetic power suits, long-distance radio communication, and metallic ships that used powerful magnetic fields in order to fly. The Spellbinders also have an advanced understanding of astronomy; Regent Coreon both knew about and had a Heliocentric model of the Solar System in his rooms. It is unclear, however, what knowledge contemporary Spellbinders have about their own technology, with Regent Coreon noting that much of his activities are dedicated to re-learning lost Spellbinder knowledge. He notes most of their knowledge, particularly of power suits and flying machines was lost after a civilizational collapse. Their flying ships and power suits are falling into disarray as they frantically search to rediscover the knowledge lost to them.

The people of the Spellbinder world are ignorant of the true nature of the Spellbinders' technology. To them, their power suits and flying ships are magic. The Spellbinders exploit this belief in order to maintain control over the people and use them for labour.

== Spellbinder technology ==
=== Power suits ===
The power suit is the central piece of Spellbinder technology. It is powered by a set of power stones, which can be recharged in the castle complex. By rubbing the cuffs of the suit together, a Spellbinder can generate and discharge a power bolt. In combat, the power suit can be worn with a small shield capable of deflecting power bolts. Although the technology is never fully explained, it is implied that the power suit increases the voltage of energy stored within the power stones and releases it in the form of static electricity. Curiously, while usually capable of immobilising or causing injury to anyone on the receiving end of a bolt, Paul survived a bolt impact unscathed at one point; a feat he put down to the rubber soles of his footwear insulating him and preventing the bolt from grounding through him.

Because the suit's copper circuitry is mounted outside the suit, it is easily disabled by splashing it with water, causing a short circuit. The new power suit (named 'Prototype KX4') created by Brian in Paul's world is able to repel the Earth's magnetic field, allowing it to fly. Its circuitry has also been sealed against being shorted out by exposure to water and power bolts are generated and discharged with the press of a button on the suit's gauntlet, rather than striking wrist plates together to generate the static electricity. The keypad on the suit's gauntlet can also control machines, such as a television and even an elevator. The new power suit, however, has a weakness of strong magnetic fields, just like the power suits in the Land of the Spellbinders.

=== Power stones ===
Power stones are the primary power source for Spellbinder technology. Spellbinders mine power stones. They are used to generate the power bolts released by power suits, and they are also used to create the magnetic fields that power flying ships. They are generally small, rectangular stones with an amber-hue, although the power stones found in flying ships are much larger. Power stones can be recharged by infusing them with electricity, which is done in the lower levels of the Spellbinders' castle. There is no analogous substance in Paul's world.

=== Summoning towers ===
Summoning towers are large metal towers that resemble electrical transformers and radio towers. The primary purpose of the summoning tower is to contact the Spellbinders when they are needed. An eyestone is placed into a cradle at the base of the tower, which presumably amplifies the signal it generates. The summoning towers also produce a magnetic field used to give flying ships their 'lift' (as evidenced when Paul shorts the main power stone in the castle, causing all flying ships to crash) and can be used as a landing pad for the flying ships.

=== Eyestones ===
Spellbinders communicate with each other with a handheld device called an eyestone. The device has an outer lattice bearing the Spellbinder insignia, and opens to reveal a small circuit board. An eyestone creates a weak radio signal, similar to a walkie-talkie. For communicating over great distances, an eyestone must be connected to a summoning tower. Village summoners are the only people besides the Spellbinders who are permitted to use eyestones.

=== Flying ships ===
The Spellbinders travel large distances in their metal flying ships. Unlike aeroplanes, which operate on aerodynamic principles, flying ships generate lift through powerful magnetic fields. Each flying ship is equipped with a pair of large power stones on either side, which rotate slowly as the ship moves. This motion creates a magnetic field powerful enough to repel against another magnetic field created by the summoning towers. Flying ships can be used for transportation and also to dust crops with pesticide. Although the technology that powers them is impressive, flying ships generally move somewhat slowly. By the time of Paul's visit to the Spellbinder's world, only six remain in operation.

=== Compass ===
Spellbinders use a small magnetic compass to navigate when travelling on foot or horseback. The compass contains a gyro device that is pulled into motion with a piece of string. The arrow of the compass then moves to detect north.

== Episodes ==
No.	Title	Directed by	Written by	Original release date
1	"The Big Bang"	Noel Price	Mark Shirrefs and John Thomson	9 January 1995
In the school science laboratory, Paul Reynolds and his best friend Alex Katsonis make gunpowder, but they end up damaging the laboratory. Later on, Paul and his classmates go on a field trip to a campsite so they can witness a solar eclipse. Alex and Paul decided to play a prank on their classmate Katrina and her friend Lisa, but it goes wrong when Paul disappears from the camp, and finds himself alone at a strange tower. There, Paul encounters a strange old man, and Paul accidentally steals an Eyestone, a strange device belonging to the man. The strange man chases Paul, who runs into the surrounding forest. Paul also loses his backpack, which is taken by the old man. The next day, while investigating his new surroundings, Paul is caught in a trap and is captured by someone.
2	"Where Am I?"	Noel Price	Mark Shirrefs and John Thomson	16 January 1995
After being caught in a trap, Paul realises that his captor is a strange girl, who mistakes Paul for a Marauder. The girl still thinks Paul is a Marauder even after he rescues her from drowning in a river and returns her belongings. She is confused by Paul's speech and thinks he is mad. Paul saves two villagers from being ambushed by two real Marauders. Upon arriving at a village, Paul thinks that, judging by his new surroundings, he has gone back in time. Only after witnessing the power of a Spellbinder named Ashka does Paul realise he is wrong. When Ashka mistakes Paul for a Marauder, she throws a powerbolt at him. The powerbolt does not affect Paul, surprising everyone present (Paul is protected by his rubber-soled sneakers). Paul runs off and is chased, and retrieves his backpack from the Spellbinder's tent. The girl Paul met earlier helps him, when she realises Paul is not a Marauder and she introduces herself as Riana. The two become friends. After seeing a flying ship destroy the Summoner's eyestone, Paul realises he is actually in a parallel world. Back at the campsite, Paul's classmates, the police and Paul's father are searching for Paul, who they believe is missing in the bush. No one believes Katrina's story, even though she watched Paul disappear.
3	"Finding the Way Home"	Noel Price	Mark Shirrefs and John Thomson	23 January 1995
Back at the campsite, the police and Paul's father are looking for Paul, believing he is lost in the bush. Only Katrina knows where Paul really is. Meanwhile, back in the Spellbinder's world, Riana takes Paul to her village, Clayhill. There, she hides Paul in the barn, but she does not tell her parents about him. Paul shows Riana his world via his camera, but Riana's mother and father come in (Riana's younger brother Jal, had spied on Riana and Paul, and informed her parents). When Riana's parents question Paul, they are confused by his speech. Riana's mother is reluctant to allow Paul to stay, and insists on reporting him to the Summoner. Things go wrong when the Summoner (the same man whose Eyestone had been stolen by Paul) himself comes in and demands to know who Paul is.
4	"It Isn't Magic, It's Science"	Noel Price	Mark Shirrefs and John Thomson	30 January 1995
When the Summoner demands to know who Paul is, Bron, Riana's father lies that Paul is his nephew. Maran, Riana's mother reluctantly allows Paul to stay, but forces him to sleep in the barn. The next day, Paul does work in the field with Riana and Jal. Paul attracts attention from Gryvon, an apprentice (who is also the Summoner's son) after he creates some labour-saving devices and saves Jal from drowning via CPR. Paul picks up a Spellbinder broadcast on his radio, and realises that the Spellbinders are scientists and not magicians. Believing the Spellbinders can help him get home, Paul tells Gryvon that he is from another world. Unfortunately, Gryvon does not believe him. Determined to prove that he is telling the truth, Paul makes gunpowder, which he uses to create makeshift fireworks. That night the village is attacked by a group of Marauders. Paul uses the gunpowder to scare the Marauders, saving the village. As the villagers praise Paul, Gryvon points out that Paul has used "magic" (which is forbidden by the Spellbinder law). To make matters worse, Gryvon finds Paul's backpack and the Summoner recognises Paul as the boy who stole his eyestone. Paul then tries to use his camera to prove he is telling the truth of where he comes from. This fails, because the camera's tape was removed by Riana's younger siblings. Paul is then detained, but Riana promises Paul that she will find the tape. Moments later Gryvon, the Summoner and his men take Paul to the Clayhill summoning tower, where a flying ship arrives to take Paul to the Spellbinder's castle, where he will face trial for his crimes. Paul still believes that the Spellbinders can help him return home, but Gryvon tells Paul that if he is banished to the Wastelands, he will never return. Meanwhile, the search for Paul continues. Katrina does some research in the school library and concludes that Paul is in another dimension. Unfortunately, she is unable to convince anyone, not even Alex, to believe her theory.
5	"Secrets"	Noel Price	Mark Shirrefs and John Thomson	6 February 1995
After he breaks the Spellbinder's laws, Paul is taken in a flying ship to the castle, where he encounters Ashka. Back in Clayhill, Gryvon takes two of Paul's fireworks while Riana is ordered by her mother to forget Paul. Riana defends Paul, by pointing out that he saved the village. When Maran reminds her daughter that Paul had broken the law, Riana voices her opinion that "the laws is unfair". At her cottage Riana discovers Paul's tape, and goes to the Summoner's house, only to be greeted by Gryvon. Gryvon orders Riana to forget Paul, for the sake of her family. Using Paul's radio, Riana proves to her parents the Paul is from another world. Bron secretly allows Riana to go the castle to help Paul, under the guise of a hunting trip. Along the way, Riana almost runs into Gryvon, who is also on his way to the castle. At the castle, Paul proves to Ashka that he is from another world. Ashka promises to save Paul from being banished, and takes him to be judged by the Regents. During the trial, Ashka tries to convince the Regents of Paul's innocence, though she does not try to save him, as she promised. The Regents also do not believe Paul's claims that he is from another world. Paul then sticks up for himself, by showing his belongings to the Regents, who sentence Paul to banishment. Paul is then detained in the castle dungeons, when he is reunited with Zander, a boy who he helped build a flying toy earlier on. Zander is also sentenced to be banished. Ashka goes to Correon, the Senior Regent, who is examining Paul's belongings, and attempts to persuade Correon to release Paul. Correon refuses, surprised at Ashka believing the villager's stories and Paul's claims. Back in Paul's world, Katrina convinces Alex to believe her theory of Paul being trapped in another world, and Katrina tells Alex that if they do not act fast, Paul will be trapped forever.
6	"Show Me Your World"	Noel Price	Mark Shirrefs and John Thomson	13 February 1995
The next day at the Spellbinder's castle, Gryvon arrives and shows Paul's fireworks to Ashka. They formulate a plan to have Paul give them the secret of gunpowder. Paul is released from his cell in the dungeons, and Ashka befriends him, hoping to learn more about his world. Ashka also promises to help Paul return home. Riana also arrives at the castle with Paul's tape, and sneaks past the guards at the gatehouse. She then encounters Correon in his study, where he is examining Paul's belongings. Riana places the tape in the camera, and proves to Correon that Paul is indeed from another world. Paul is taken to Correon's study, where he is reunited with Riana. Paul then uses the camera to show Correon and the Regents his world. The Regents, intrigued with Paul's knowledge, agree to question Paul further instead of banishing him. Unfortunately, Riana is forced to become a castle servant as she has seen too much of the Spellbinder's secrets, and Paul is taken back to the dungeons. Back in Paul's world, Katrina and Alex take their theory of Paul's disappearance to Paul's scientist father, Dr. Brian Reynolds. Unfortunately, Brian does not believe their story, as he sees no scientific basis in their theory. Brian instead believes that Paul is lost in the bush around the campsite. Determined to prove their theory is the truth, Alex and Katrina leave to find more proof. Back at the Spellbinder's castle, Ashka lies to Paul that the Regents want to banish him. On Ashka's orders, Gryvon takes Paul to a basement, which doubles as a makeshift laboratory, where Paul will make them gunpowder. In Correon's study, Ashka confronts Riana, falsely promising to help her. Ashka then takes Riana to Paul's cell in the dungeons, and has the guards detain Riana, lying that she helped Paul escape.
7	"The Gunpowder Plot"	Noel Price	Mark Shirrefs and John Thomson	20 February 1995
Ashka orders the guards to detain Riana, after framing her for helping Paul escape the castle. However, Riana runs through the castle complex, forcing Ashka and the guards to chase after her. Riana disguises herself as a castle servant to avoid Ashka and the guards. Meanwhile, in the basement laboratory, Paul makes a batch of gunpowder for Ashka, but Gryvon asks Paul to make him gunpowder. As Paul does not trust Gryvon for the earlier disagreements, he gives Gryvon a false recipe. Riana spies on Paul making gunpowder for Ashka and Gryvon, but she is caught by Ashka, who has Riana bound and gagged. Ashka and Gryvon then lock Riana in a castle bathroom. Back in Paul's world, Katrina and Alex attend a literature camp, which will take them back to the campsite where Paul disappeared. Alex and Katrina take the identity of two other students. Back at the Spellbinder's castle, Ashka and Gryvon decide to test the gunpowder the following day, albeit outside the castle. They disguise Paul as a servant, so they can sneak him out. Riana escapes the bathroom, and informs Correon of Ashka's plot. Riana takes Correon to the basement where Paul made the gunpowder. Correon decides to stop Ashka, but he reluctantly takes Riana with him. Ashka & Gryvon take Paul to the ruined castle of the Old Spellbinders, so they can test the gunpowder, while Riana and Correon spy on them. After the test, Ashka refuses to release Paul, wishing to learn more about his world. Gryvon discovers that Paul had tricked him with a false gunpowder recipe. Seeing this, Correon realises that Paul's knowledge is too dangerous and that he must return to his own world. Via the eyestone network, Correon tricks Ashka into returning to the castle, while Gryvon ties up Paul. Correon and Riana appears, demanding that Gryvon release Paul. Gryvon runs off, and is chased by Paul and Riana. But Paul falls into a vault of the ruined castle, and is trapped.
8	"Secrets of the Spellbinders"	Noel Price	Mark Shirrefs and John Thomson	27 February 1995
Correon and Paul explore a vault in the ruins of the old Spellbinders' castle. After Correon finds a book, they make a surprising discovery: the Darkness was caused not by the Marauders, but by the old Spellbinders, who attempted to increase their power. Correon realises that like Ashka, the old Spellbinders were arrogant fools, who wanted more power. Paul realises the Darkness was like the nuclear winters of his world. They escape the vault, and Riana captures Gryvon, when he tries to escape. Correon speaks to the Regents via his eyestone, and tells them that he will return Paul to his world, because his knowledge is too dangerous. Ashka arrives at the castle, but discovers at Correon is not there. After hearing that Correon is helping Paul return home, she persuades the Regents to let her stop Correon. Ashka charters a flying ship to track Correon, but she loses him, after Riana destroys Correon's eyestone. After Correon falls ill, Paul and Riana take him to Clayhill to see the Healer. At Clayhill, Correon also meets Riana's family. Back in Paul's world, Alex and Katrina return to the campsite where Paul disappeared, by going on the literature camp. Katrina discovers that radios can be used to communicate with the Spellbinder's world, after Alex's radio picks up a Spellbinder broadcast. At night, Alex and Katrina experiment on several walkie-talkies, but are sent to bed after the teacher finds them. The next day, Alex and Katrina use a walkie-talkie to contact the Spellbinder's world. They contact Ashka, but the teacher arrives, having learnt of their ruse. Back in the Spellbinder's world, Correon, Paul and Riana leave the village the next day for the summoning tower. Maran discovers Gryvon tied up in the barn. At the summoning tower, Correon collapses, after he fails to use his powersuit to open the portal. Gryvon arrives at the tower along with the Summoner and his men. They seize Paul, but Correon orders them to release Paul, and forbids Gryvon to follow them. Correon, Paul and Riana go to another summoning tower, but they are attacked by a group of Marauders.
9	"The Labyrinth"	Noel Price	Mark Shirrefs and John Thomson	6 March 1995
Paul, Riana and Correon are captured by Marauders. Paul recognises one of his captors as Zander, who he met in the castle dungeons earlier. Zander explains that he joined the Marauders, after they saved him in the wastelands. After seeing Ashka approach in her flying ship, Paul sabotages the summoning tower, which causes Ashka's flying ship to crash. Correon, Paul and Riana then leave with the Marauders. Ashka and Gryvon approach the tower, where they find the Marauders' and Paul's footprints. They follow them into the forest, after Ashka believes that Paul would teach the Marauders to make gunpowder. Meanwhile, the Marauders take Paul, Riana and Correon to their hidden campsite, deep in the forest. At the Marauder's campsite, Paul, Riana and Correon discover that the Marauders are mostly villagers banished for breaking the law and that they pose no threat to the Spellbinders. The Marauders vote to punish Correon by sending him to the wastelands, despite Paul's protests. That night, Paul and Correon try to escape the Marauder's base but they get lost in a maze of rock formations which surround the camp. Back in Paul's world, Alex is forbidden to see Katrina, by her parents. Alex and Katrina are unable to convince anyone that their theory of Paul's disappearance is true. Alex goes to his classmate Nathan, who works with electronic devices, believing he can help. Alex tells Nathan a sob-story about a forbidden romance between himself and Katrina. Nathan gives Alex a radio and recording device, which he and Katrina use to find proof for Paul's father.
10	"Desperate Measures"	Noel Price	Mark Shirrefs and John Thomson	13 March 1995
Paul and Correon try to escape the Marauder's camp, but they are caught by Riana and Zander. Zander, who now believes that Paul is from another world, agrees to help him- even if he also has to help Correon. They are caught by the other Marauders, who learn of gunpowder and want it for themselves. Meanwhile, Ashka and Gryvon are in the rock formations. The Marauders then take Paul, Riana and Correon to a hill overlooking the wastelands. The Marauders blackmail Paul into giving them the secret of gunpowder, by threatening to send Correon to the wastelands. Paul refuses, so Correon shows the book he retrieved from the old Spellbinder's castle to the Marauders. Correon explains how the old Spellbinders caused the darkness, but the Marauders remain unconvinced and decide to banish Correon. Gryvon manages to steal Correon's powersuit, as he and Ashka plan to attack the campsite. Meanwhile, back in Paul's world, Alex and Katrina convince Nick, Alex's older brother to drive them to the campsite. Upon reaching the campsite, Alex and Katrina set up their equipment, and eavesdrop on Ashka and Gryvon's eyestone conversation. Using the radio to broadcast on the eyestones, Katrina warns Paul that Ashka and Gryvon are after him. Back in the Spellbinder's world, Paul, Riana, Correon and the other Marauders hear this warning. Ashka and Gryvon appear and attack the Marauder's campsite, causing a huge panic. During the chaos, Paul and Zander are captured by Ashka and Gryvon, while Correon is recaptured by Marauders. Paul shows Ashka the book from the ruins and explains why Correon is helping him return home. Refusing to believe the old Spellbinders caused the Darkness, Ashka burns the book, and forces Zander to guide them out of the rock formations. Ashka and Gryvon take Paul back to the castle. Back at the Marauder's campsite, Zander persuades the Marauders to release Correon, believing he can bring peace. At the castle, Ashka lies to the Regents that the Marauders killed Correon. They believe Ashka, giving her full authority to conspire against the Marauders. Ashka and Gryvon take Paul back to the basement, where Ashka orders Paul to make more gunpowder. Correon arrives at the castle, but the guards, unable to recognise Correon in his dishevelled state, refuse to let him in. Paul creates a diversion to distract Ashka and Gryvon, and runs off to the Regent's quarters. Due to this distraction, Correon is able to get past the guards. In the Regent's quarters, Paul tries to warn them of Ashka's villainy, but Ashka and Gryvon arrive, trying to stop Paul. Moments later, Correon enters the room, surprising everyone present.
11	"The Centre of Power"	Noel Price	Mark Shirrefs and John Thomson	20 March 1995
Correon tries to expose Ashka's villainy to the Regents, and calls her a liar. Angered, Ashka challenges Correon to a duel, which he accepts. Gryvon is forced to return Correon's power-suit and Paul radio to their rightful owners. While Paul helps Correon prepare for the challenge, Gryvon sabotages Correon's power-suit on Ashka's orders. At the Marauder's campsite, Riana discovers that Paul's friends are trying to contact him, and persuades Zander to release her. Zander guides Riana out of the rock formations, and she departs for the castle. Just as the duel begins, Paul discovers that Gryvon has sabotaged Correon's powersuit but is too late to warn Correon. The Regents remove Correon of his title as Spellbinder and Regent and he is banished. Before Correon leaves the castle, Paul gives Correon his radio, so he can hear what the Spellbinders say, while Correon voices his hopes that Paul returns home. Meanwhile, Riana arrives at the castle, and climbs over the castle walls. Back in Paul's world, Alex uses the walkie-talkie to contact Paul, but to no avail. Riana follows Gryvon as he takes Paul to see Ashka, who has moved into Correon's study. There, Paul secretly uses his camera to record Ashka who reveals her plan to overthrow the Regents. Gryvon discovers what Paul has done, and Paul escapes the room with the camera. Riana arrives and helps Paul escape Ashka and Gryvon, telling Paul that his friends are trying to contact him. Being chased through the castle, they arrive at the Spellbinder's centre of power. Ashka arrives and confronts Paul, but he traps her in the frame around the power centre. Gryvon arrives and removes his powersuit, and he tries to help Ashka. Paul steals Gryvon's powersuit, and he and Riana enter a flying ship. Paul has difficulty using the controls, as Ashka approaches.
12	"Spellbinder Jack"	Noel Price	Mark Shirrefs and John Thomson	27 March 1995
Paul and Riana escape the castle in a flying ship. While flying the ship towards Clayhill, Paul manages to use the eyestone in the flying ship to contact Alex and Katrina. He arranges them to recreate the conditions which opened the portal. Knowing that the Regents are listening, Paul plays Ahska's confession on his camera. At the castle, Ashka hears this and shuts down the centre of power to stop the transmission. This causes the flying ship, with Paul and Riana inside to crash. Paul is trapped under the wreckage and Riana tries to help him. A farmer encounters them and mistakes Paul for a Spellbinder. The farmer takes Paul and Riana to his village. At the village, Paul and Riana impersonate a Spellbinder and Apprentice, but they flee after the villagers learn of their deception. Meanwhile Correon winds up in the Wastelands. Using Paul's radio, he hears of Paul's escape. Correon then collapses out of exhaustion, and is found by Zander and Kurn, another Marauder. Back in Paul's world, Alex and Katrina are caught by their principal Mr. Kennett, who confiscates the walkie-talkie. They convince Paul's father to help them but Brian still does not believe them, still under the assumption that his son is lost in the bush. To return to the campsite, Alex and Katrina decide to take the train. Back in the Spellbinder's world, Paul and Riana run into Paul, Gryvon and several guards searching for them. Paul and Riana jump into a river and successfully evade their pursuers. Downstream, Paul and Riana arrive in Clayhill, by nightfall. To open the doorway to his world, Paul and Riana search for a chain to harness to the Summoning Tower, but, they are found by Riana's father. Bron considers turning Paul to the Summoner, for endangering his daughter, but Riana persuades her father to help Paul, unaware that the Clayhill Summoner is spying on them.
13	"The Final Challenge"	Noel Price	Mark Shirrefs and John Thomson	4 April 1995
In Clayhill, Bron demands an explanation from Paul, wanting to know why the Spellbinders are after him and Riana. In response, Paul, shows Bron the video of Ashka's confession on his camera. While Paul wants Riana to show the camera to the Regents, Bron is reluctant, due to the trouble Paul caused for their family. At the castle, Ashka and Gryvon inform the Regents that Paul drowned in a river, ending the threat of an invasion from his world. Via the eyestone network, the Summoner informs them that Paul is in his village. Gryvon and Ashka depart for Clayhill, intending to recover Paul's camera. In Clayhill, Paul tries to help Bron evacuate his family, but the Summoner arrives. Maran turns Paul over to the Summoner, who also detains Riana and Bron. Maran learns that her family will face banishment, and she has a change of heart and decides to help Paul escape. She tricks the Summoner and his men by giving them tea, spiked with a sleeping draught. While Riana helps her family, Paul takes the chain and goes for the Summoning tower alone. Back in Paul's world, Alex helps Katrina sneak out of her house. The two persuade a nun at the train station to give them a ride to the campsite. After arriving at the campsite, Alex and Katrina hang a wire, to open the doorway to the Spellbinder's world. Ashka and Gryvon arrive in Clayhill but find that Paul, his camera, Riana and her family are nowhere to be seen. Riana and her family hide in the barn, but it does not take long before Ashka and Gryvon figure out where Paul is heading. Despite her father's objections, Riana leaves the village to help Paul. At the summoning tower, Paul connects the chain to the tower, just as Ashka and Gryvon arrive. Paul runs off and Gryvon chases after him. On her eyestone, Ashka is contacted by Katrina. Pretending to be Riana, Ashka lies that it is safe to open the doorway. With Riana's help, Paul knocks out Gryvon and steals his powersuit. They return to the summoning tower, where the doorway is open, but Ashka arrives and damages the summoning tower with a powerbolt to stop Paul going home. Riana distracts Ashka, and Paul runs through the doorway, and back to his world. Paul sees Ashka about to attack Riana back on the other side of the doorway, so he pulls Riana through the doorway, to save her. Due to Ashka's damage, the damaged Summoning Tower fails, and the doorway closes, leaving Riana stranded in Paul's world.
14	"Lost and Found"	Noel Price	Mark Shirrefs and John Thomson	11 April 1995
With the Summoning tower damaged, Riana is stranded in Paul's world and unable to help her family, much to her concern. Paul promises to find a way to send Riana home, while Alex and Katrina reluctantly agree not to tell anyone about the Spellbinder's world. After a train ride to the city, Riana becomes separated from Paul and his friends and finds herself lost in the city. Ashka & Gryvon return to Clayhill and order the Summoner to find Riana's family and bring her the camera. To protect his family, Bron flees the village with the camera but is sighted. Ashka orders Gryvon and the Summoner's men to catch him and orders Bron's capture via the eyestone. At the Marauder's camp, Correon hears this and leaves with Zander to find Bron, hoping to know what happened to Paul. Paul asks the police to help him find Riana but he is instead taken to a station, where he is identified and reunited with his family. Paul's father Brian dismisses his son's story about the Spellbinders as a fantasy and takes Paul home.
15	"Hospitality"	Noel Price	Mark Shirrefs and John Thomson	18 April 1995
Lost in the city, Riana makes friends with a girl named Josie and her brother Ben. After injuring her ankle, Riana is taken to a hospital, which proves to be a stranger place for Riana. Paul convinces his father to let him return to school, and he and Alex skip school to find Riana but are unsuccessful. After learning that Riana is at the hospital, Paul and Alex go to visit her but Riana can't leave without an adult. Back in the Spellbinder's world, Ashka interrogates Maran for Bron's whereabouts, burning her cottage when she refuses. After Paul is unsuccessful in convincing Brian to get Riana out of the hospital, he and Alex decide to recharge the powersuit's powerstones at the shipping yard where Alex's father works. Riana attempts to escape the hospital, but is unsuccessful. Paul and Alex manage to get the powersuit operational, but cause an electrical disturbance with the yard's lights.
16	"Breakout"	Noel Price	Mark Shirrefs and John Thomson	25 April 1995
After fixing the powersuit, Paul, Alex and Katrina return to the hospital and learn Riana is transferred to a high-security ward, after her escape attempt. After they are unsuccessful in telling the truth about Riana, Paul and his friends plan to break Riana out of the hospital but using the powersuit. In the Spellbinder's world, Ashka and Gryvon take Maran and her youngest children to the castle, but Maran's youngest daughter Arla escapes. Arla reunites with her father, who is heading to the castle with Correon and Zander to show the camera to the Regents. Alex and Paul successfully break Riana out of hospital, but hiding Riana at his home proves difficult for Paul. Katrina reveals that their breakout make news headlines, but Paul is confident that all is well, until Paul's sister Christine meets Riana.
17	"The Trojan Toffee Trolley"	Noel Price	Mark Shirrefs and John Thomson	2 May 1995
18	"Run!"	Noel Price	Mark Shirrefs and John Thomson	9 May 1995
19	"Reunions"	Noel Price	Mark Shirrefs and John Thomson	16 May 1995
20	"Alien Invasion"	Noel Price	Mark Shirrefs and John Thomson	23 May 1995
21	"Hunt for Ashka"	Noel Price	Mark Shirrefs and John Thomson	30 May 1995
22	"Clowning Around"	Noel Price	Mark Shirrefs and John Thomson	6 June 1995
23	"High Tech Power Suit"	Noel Price	Mark Shirrefs and John Thomson	13 June 1995
24	"A Spellbinder in the House"	Noel Price	Mark Shirrefs and John Thomson	20 June 1995
25	"Breakfast of Champions"	Noel Price	Mark Shirrefs and John Thomson	27 June 1995
26	"Flight"	Noel Price	Mark Shirrefs and John Thomson	4 July 1995

== Awards and nominations ==
=== Australian Film Institute Awards ===
Year	Nominee	Award	Result	Ref
1996	Noel Price (for "The Centre of Power")	Best Children's Television Drama	Won	

=== Australian Writers' Guild ===
Year	Nominee	Award	Result	Ref
1996	Spellbinder	Children's Original	Won	

=== Logie Awards ===
Year	Nominee	Award	Result	Ref
1996	Spellbinder	Most Popular Children's Program	Nominated	

== Telecast and home media ==
The original Spellbinder series ran on the Australian Nine Network between January and July 1995. Internationally, the series was shown in the U.S. on The Disney Channel beginning on 5 February 1996, and the sequel appeared on Fox Family Channel beginning in 1998. Due to a license dispute, The Disney Channel airing used a different opening and closing sequence.

As of 2023, the show is now airing on Retro TV.

The series was screened in the United Kingdom and Ireland on ITV and Network 2's The Den respectively in 1996 (only episodes 1–13 aired on ITV). The series was aired in Sri Lanka by Sri Lanka Rupavahini Corporation as "Maya Bandana" "මායාා බන්ධන" (Series 1) and "Makara Rajadahana" "මකර රජදහන" (Series 2). Owing to its utmost popularity it was telecasted more than five times in Sri Lanka over the years. The series was aired in Pakistan by Pakistan Television. In Bangladesh, Spellbinder was broadcast in Bangladesh Television (BTV). The series received immense popularity from viewers. The second sequel Spellbinder, the Land of the Dragon Lord was also telecast on BTV.

The series is now available to stream on Netflix in Australia and Amazon Prime Video in the U.S. and Germany.

It was broadcast in France and Mauritius in the late 1990s and early 2000s under the title "Les Maîtres des Sortilèges" (The Masters of Spells)

Title	Set details	DVD release dates	
Title	Set details	Region 4	Region 2
Spellbinder – Series One Part One	Discs: 2; Episodes: 13	19 September 2005	—N/a
Spellbinder – Complete Series 1	Discs: 4; Episodes: 26	10 July 2006; 10 March 2010	—N/a
Spellbinder: Gefangen in der Vergangenheit – Volume 1	Discs: 2; Episodes: 13	—N/a	10 March 2017
Spellbinder: Gefangen in der Vergangenheit – Volume 2	Discs: 2; Episodes: 13	—N/a	26 May 2017
