= Lara Robinson =

Australian actress (born 1998)

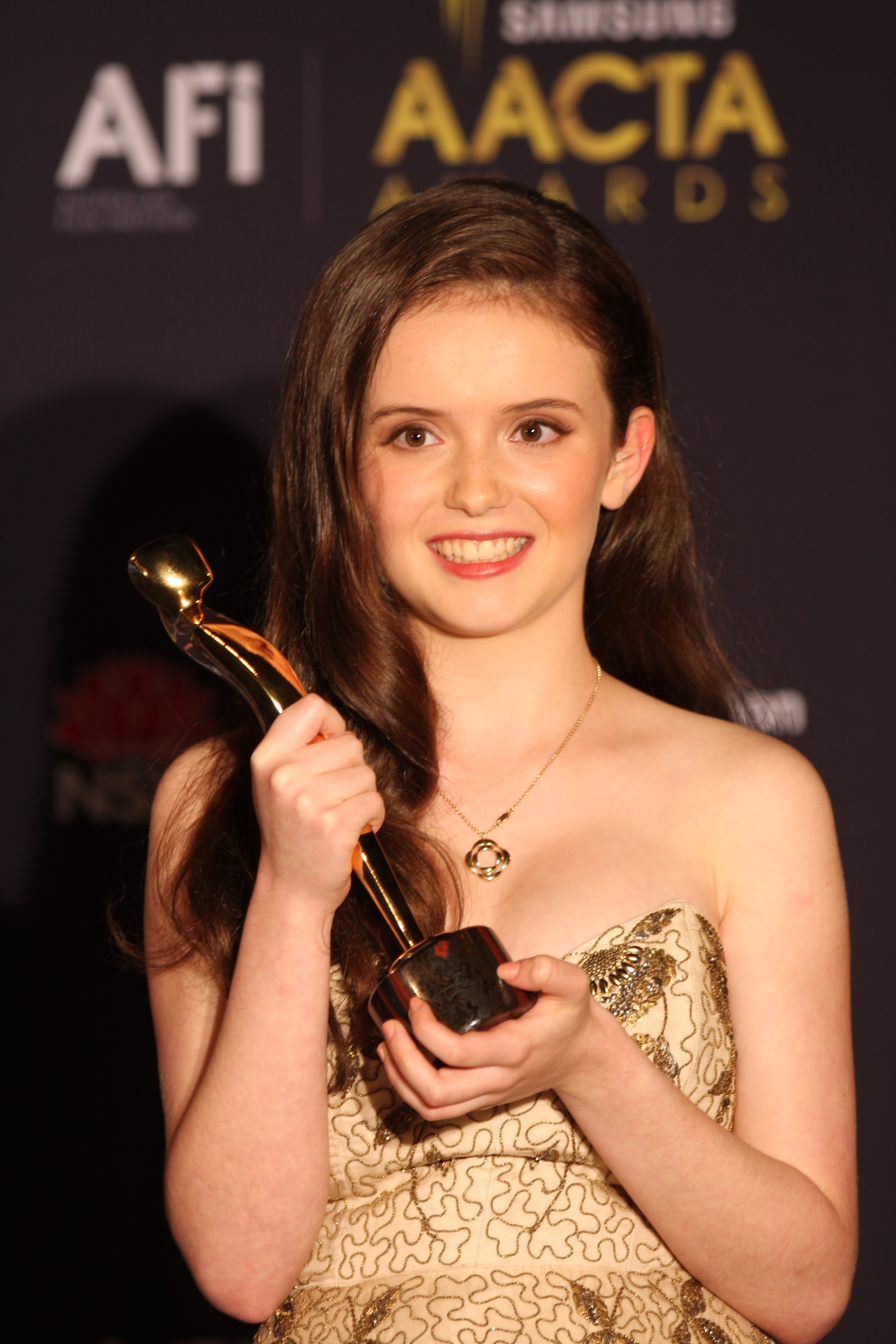
- Robinson in 2012
- Born: 1 January 1998 (age 28); Melbourne, Victoria, Australia
- Occupations: Actress, Singer, Theatre director
- Years active: 2006–present

Lara Robinson (born 1 January 1998) is an Australian actress who has appeared in films, television series, and theatre productions.

== Career ==
Robinson has appeared in a remake of a 1978 Australian thriller Long Weekend starring Claudia Karvan as well as an American science fiction drama, Knowing, starring Nicolas Cage and Rose Byrne. She has also made guest television appearances on television series such as City Homicide and Elephant Princess. Robinson joined the cast of Winners & Losers in 2012 as student Tilly Young. Apart from acting, she is also a musician and dancer.

In 2024, she produced and directed a play titled Yaya As... The Wise Men of Chelm. It played at the King's Head Theatre and Camden People's Theatre.

== Filmography ==
=== Films ===
Year	Film	Role	Notes
2007	Work in Progress	Girl	Short film
2007	Long Weekend	Girl in Car	
2009	Knowing	Abby Wayland / Young Lucinda	
2009	Saved	Grace Weston	TV movie
2012	Catch Perfect	Lucy	Short film
2014	Can You See Them?	Katie	Short film
2018	The BBQ	Montana	
2018	St Bernie	Bernie	Short film
2020	Land	Lillianna	Short film
TBA	Enter Sanctum	Jane	

=== Television ===
Year	Title	Role	Notes
2007	City Homicide	Louise Patterson	2 episodes: "In the Hands of Giants: Part 1" and "In the Hands of Giants: Part 2"
2008	The Elephant Princess	Gretel	1 episode: "Welcome to the Fairy Tale"
2011	Cloudstreet	Young Rose Pickles	1 episode: "Part 1" – AACTA Award for Best Young Actor winner
2012	Miss Fisher's Murder Mysteries	Ruth	1 episode: "Murder on the Ballarat Train"
2012	Winners & Losers	Tilly Young	5 episodes: "A Problem Shared", "The Right Time", "Footprints", "Eyes Wide Open", "To Have and to Hold"
2013–16	Upper Middle Bogan	Edwina Bright	Main role
2014	The Doctor Blake Mysteries	Peggy Bowen	Season 2, Episode 2
2015	Childhood's End (miniseries)	Young Peretta	1 episode: "The Deceivers"
2017	Fancy Boy	Becky	Season 1, Episode 5
2021	Why Are You Like This	Maddie	Season 1, Episode 4
