= Bunny (play) =

Play by Norman Krasna

Bunny is a play by Norman Krasna.

In April 1970 Krasna announced it would go to Broadway and would be produced by Leland Hayward. "We're hoping for a big name" said Krasna who said the play was about a 35-year-old woman "who gets around." The play did not go to Broadway. There was a London production in 1972 starring Eartha Kitt. The Guardian called it "about amusing as an eyewitness account of the Black Death".

It was sent to Ellen Burstyn to appear in or direct. She decided to direct a production put on at the Actors Studio in 1979.
