= AACTA Award for Best Short Animation =

Short Film Award

Best Short Animation AACTA Award
- Country: Australia
- Presented by: Australian Academy of Cinema and Television Arts (AACTA)
- First award: 1979
- Currently held by: Nullarbor (2011)
- Website: http://www.aacta.org

The AACTA Award for Best Short Animation, is a short film award presented by the Australian Academy of Cinema and Television Arts (AACTA) to the producer and director of an Australian short animated film that is "a self-contained and continuous animated film of short fiction or documentary of less than 40 minutes in duration." Prior to the establishment of the academy in 2011, the award was presented by the Australian Film Institute (AFI) at the annual Australian Film Institute Awards (more commonly known as the AFI Awards) from 1979 to 2010. The award is presented at the AACTA Awards Luncheon, a black tie event which celebrates achievements in film production, television, documentaries and short films.

== Winners and nominees ==
In the following table, winners are listed first, in boldface and highlighted in gold; those listed below the winner that are not in boldface or highlighted are the nominees.

Winner

=== AFI Awards (1979–2010) ===
Year	Film	Producer(s)	Director(s)
**1979** (21st)	**Letter to a Friend**	**Sonia Hofmann**	**Sonia Hofmann**
**1980** (22nd)	**Pussy Pumps Up**	**Antoinette Starkiewicz**	**Antoinette Starkiewicz**
**1981** (23rd)	**The Animation Game**	**Eric Halliday**	**David Johnston**
1981 (23rd)	Bushed		Stephen French
1981 (23rd)	Foxbat and the Mimi		John Skibinski
**1982** (24th)	**Flank Breeder**	**Bruce Currie**	**Bruce Currie**
1982 (24th)	Dudu and the Line	Steve French	Steve French
1982 (24th)	The Great Wave	Tony Gooley	Tony Gooley
**1983** (25th)	**Dance of Death**	**Dennis Tupicoff**	**Dennis Tupicoff**
1983 (25th)	Foxbat and the Demon	John Skibinski	John Skibinski
**1984** (26th)	**Ned Wethered**	**Lee Whitmore**	**Lee Whitmore**
1984 (26th)	Anatomy of a Businessman	Bruce Currie	Bruce Currie
1984 (26th)	The Thief of Sydney	Toby Zoates	Toby Zoates
1984 (26th)	Waltz Mambo	Andrew Quinn	Andrew Quinn
**1985** (27th)	**Waltzing Matilda**	**John Morris**	**Michael Cusack and Richard Chataway**
1985 (27th)	Cut Out Animation	David Johnson	David Johnson
1985 (27th)	Kitchen Sync	Maree Woolley	Maree Woolley
1985 (27th)	Pianoforte	Julia Overton	Antoinette Starkiewicz
**1986** (28th)	**The Huge Adventures of Trevor, A Cat**	**John C. J. Taylor**	**John C. J. Taylor**
1986 (28th)	Change of Place	Kathy Smith	Kathy Smith
1986 (28th)	Elephant Theatre	Sabrina Schmid	Sabrina Schmid
1986 (28th)	Joshua Cooks	Penny Robenstone	Penny Robenstone
**1987** (29th)	**Crust**	**John E. Hughes**	**John E. Hughes**
1987 (29th)	224	Dirk de Bruyn	Dirk de Bruyn
1987 (29th)	In Love Cancer	David Atkinson	Jenni Robertson
1987 (29th)	Worry	Charles Amsden	Charles Amsden
**1988** (30th)	**Where the Forest Meets the Sea**	**Jeannie Baker**	**Jeannie Baker**
1988 (30th)	A Craven	Anne Algar	Anne Algar
1988 (30th)	Feathers and Fools	Penny Robenstone	Penny Robenstone
1988 (30th)	Home Sweet Home	Simone Lindhout	Simone Lindhout
**1989** (31st)	**Still Flying**	**Robert Stephenson**	**Robert Stephenson**
1989 (31st)	Lucky Girl	Jeffrey Noonan	Jeffrey Noonan
1989 (31st)	Ratropolis	Jenni B-Zipporah and Bix Nussey	Jenni B-Zipporah and Bix Nussey
1989 (31st)	The Shadowlands	Anthony Lucas	Anthony Lucas
**1990** (32nd)	**Picture Start**	**David Atkinson and John Bird**	**Jeremy Parker**
1990 (32nd)	Once As If A Balloon	Sabrina Schmid	Jeremy Parker and Sabrina Schmid
1990 (32nd)	The Emu and the Sun	John Skibinski	John Skibinski
1990 (32nd)	Tiga	Lucinda Clutterbuck	Lucinda Clutterbuck
**1991** (33rd)	**Union Street**	**Anne Grieve**	**Wendy Chandler**
1991 (33rd)	Feral Television		David Ledwich
1991 (33rd)	Reaper Madness		Nick Donkin
1991 (33rd)	Two Fish	Unjoo Moon	Rohan Smith
**1992** (34th)	**Shelf Life**		**Andrew Horne**
1992 (34th)	Secrets of the City	Cathy Linsley	Cathy Linsley
1992 (34th)	The Amphibian		Sina Azad and Anthony Lucas
1992 (34th)	The Descent		Andrew Schult
**1993** (35th)	**The Darra Dogs**	**Dennis Tupicoff**	**Dennis Tupicoff**
1993 (35th)	A Saucer of Water for the Birds	Ann Shenfield	Ann Shenfield
1993 (35th)	Arnold Has A Thought	Peter McDonald	Peter McDonald
1993 (35th)	The Web - 'Bandicoot'		Lucinda Clutterbuck and Sarah Watt
**1994** (36th)	**Gorgeous**	**Rob Wellington**	**Kaz Cooke**
1994 (36th)	Muttaburrasaurus	David Roberts	Grahame Binding and Norman Yeend
1994 (36th)	The Junky's Christmas	Francis Ford Coppola	Nick Donkin and Melodie McDaniel
1994 (36th)	Total Recession	Hugh Freitag and Durand Greig	Durand Greig
**1995** (37th)	**Small Treasures**	**Fiona Eagger and Sarah Watt**	**Sarah Watt**
1995 (37th)	Great Moments In Science: Falling Cats		Andrew Horne
1995 (37th)	The Story of Rosie Dock	Screen Australia	Jeannie Baker
1995 (37th)	Writer's Block	Michael Lawrence	Leon Cmielewski
**1996** (38th)	**Blood on the Chandelier**		**Jeffrey Norris**
1996 (38th)	Lovely Day		Chris Backhouse
1996 (38th)	The Journey		Robert Gudan
1996 (38th)	The Web 2 - 'Wolf'		Lucinda Clutterbuck
**1997** (39th)	**Uncle**	**Ann Shenfield, Robert Stephenson and Sarah Watt**	**Adam Elliot**
1997 (39th)	Heartbreak Motel		Greg Holfeld
1997 (39th)	His Mother's Voice		Dennis Tupicoff
1997 (39th)	On a Full Moon		Lee Whitmore
**1998** (40th)	**Vengeance**		**Wendy Chandler**
1998 (40th)	Harry The Human Fly		Darryl Aylward
1998 (40th)	Has Beans	Miriam Stein	Andrew Tamandl
1998 (40th)	Seabound	Ann Shenfield, Robert Stephenson and Sarah Watt	Donna Kendrigan
**1999** (41st)	**Cousin**	**Adam Elliot**	**Adam Elliot**
1999 (41st)	HeadSpace		Chris Backhouse
1999 (41st)	Project Vlad		Aaron Rogers
1999 (41st)	Slim Pickings		Anthony Lucas
**2000** (42nd)	**Brother**	**Adam Elliot**	**Adam Elliot**
2000 (42nd)	Full Circle		Adam Head
2000 (42nd)	Leunig: Tricks		Andrew Horne
2000 (42nd)	The Way of the Birds		Sarah Watt
**2001** (43rd)	**Living With Happiness**	**Sarah Watt**	**Sarah Watt**
2001 (43rd)	Bad Baby Amy	Anthony Lucas and Edwina von Stiegler	Anthony Lucas
2001 (43rd)	The Collective	Daniella Ortega	Norah Mulroney
2001 (43rd)	The Exploding Woman	Melissa Johnston	Nancy Allen
**2002** (44th)	**Shh.**	**Andi Spark and Paul Fletcher**	**Adam Robb**
2002 (44th)	Into the Dark	Fiona Cochrane and Dennis Tupicoff	Dennis Tupicoff
2002 (44th)	Pa	Andrew McVitty	Neil Goodridge
2002 (44th)	Show and Tell		Mark Gravas
**2003** (45th)	**Harvie Krumpet**	**Melanie Coombs**	**Adam Elliot**
2003 (45th)	Cane Toad: What Happened To Baz?	David Clayton and Andrew Silke	David Clayton and Andrew Silke
2003 (45th)	Hello	David Atkinson and Jonathan Nix	Jonathan Nix
2003 (45th)	Mother Tongue	Lea Croyden and Susan Kim	Susan Kim
**2004** (46th)	**Birthday Boy**	**Andrew Gregory**	**Sejong Park**
2004 (46th)	Footnote		Pia Borg
2004 (46th)	It's Like That	Susan Earl, Nicole McKinnon, Sharon Parker and Sophie Raymond	Southern Ladies Animation Group (SLAG)
2004 (46th)	Lucky For Some		Robert Stephenson
**2005** (47th)	**The Mysterious Geographic Explorations of Jasper Morello**	**Anthony Lucas and Julia Lucas**	**Anthony Lucas**
2005 (47th)	2:41 Upfield		Callum Cooper
2005 (47th)	Fritz Gets Rich	Sam White	Eddie White and James Calvert
2005 (47th)	Piñata	Thomas Schober	Mike Hollands
**2006** (48th)	**Gargoyle**		**Michael Cusack**
2006 (48th)	Carnivore Reflux	Huy Nguyen and Sam White	Eddie White and James Calvert
2006 (48th)	The Astronomer	Kate McCartney	Kate McCartney
2006 (48th)	The Safe House	Denise Haslem	Lee Whitmore
**2007** (49th)	**The Girl Who Swallowed Bees**	**Justine Kerrigan**	**Paul McDermott**
2007 (49th)	An Imaginary Life	Steve Baker	Steve Baker
2007 (49th)	Dust Echoes 2 - 'The Bat And The Butterfly'	Michael Wagner, Dave Jones	
2007 (49th)	The Goat That Ate Time	Lucinda Schreiber	Lucinda Schreiber
**2008** (50th)	**Dog With Electric Collar**	**Damon Escott**	**Steve Baker**
2008 (50th)	Chainsaw	Fiona Cochrane and Dennis Tupicoff	Dennis Tupicoff
2008 (50th)	Mutt	Beth Frey	Glen Hunwick
2008 (50th)	Paper City	Daniel Agdag	
**2009** (51st)	**The Cat Piano**	**Jessica Brentnall**	**Eddie White and Ari Gibson**
2009 (51st)	Chicken of God	Jodi Satya, Frank Woodley	Frank Woodley
2009 (51st)	The Not-So-Great Eugene Green	Melanie Brunt	Michael Hill
2009 (51st)	Reach		Luke Randall
**2010** (52nd)	**The Lost Thing**	**Sophie Byrne**	**Andrew Ruhemann** and **Shaun Tan**
2010 (52nd)	Zero	Christine Kezelos	Christopher Kezelos

=== AACTA Awards (2012–present) ===
Year	Film	Producer(s)	Director(s)
**2011** **(1st)**	**Nullarbor**	**Alister Lockhart**, **Patrick Sarell**, **Katrina Mathers**, **Merrin Jensen** and **Daryl Munton**	
2011 (1st)	Forget Me Not	Emily Dean	
2011 (1st)	The Missing Key	Garth Nix, Anna McFarlane and Jonathan Nix	
2011 (1st)	The Moment	Justin Wight, Kristian Moliere, Troy Bellchambers and Shane McNeil	

== See also ==
- List of animation awards
- AACTA Awards
