= 1995 Australian Film Institute Awards =

Australian film and TV awards ceremony

37th Australian Film Institute Awards
- Date: 10 November 1995
- Site: Melbourne, Australia
- Hosted by: Magda Szubanski

Highlights
- Best Film: Angel Baby
- Most awards: Film: Angel Baby (7); TV: Halifax f.p. (4)
- Most nominations: Film: Hotel Sorrento (10); TV: Halifax f.p. (15)

Television coverage
- Network: ABC

The 37th Australian Film Institute Awards (generally known as the AFI Awards) were held on 10 November 1995 in Melbourne. Presented by the Australian Film Institute (AFI), the awards celebrated the best in Australian feature film, documentary, short film and television productions of 1995. The ceremony was broadcast live on ABC and hosted by comedian Magda Szubanski. The nominations were announced on 9 August 1995. Hotel Sorrento received the most nominations in the feature film category with ten, while Halifax f.p. received fifteen nominations in the television category.

== Winners and nominees ==
Winners are listed first and highlighted in boldface.

=== Feature film ===
Best Film	Best Achievement in Direction
**Angel Baby – Timothy White, Jonathon Shteinman**; All Men Are Liars – John Maynard; Hotel Sorrento – Richard Franklin; That Eye, the Sky – Peter Beilby, Grainne Marmion	**Michael Rymer – Angel Baby**; Richard Franklin – Hotel Sorrento; Margot Nash – Vacant Possession; John Ruane – That Eye, the Sky
Best Performance by an Actor in a Leading Role	Best Performance by an Actress in a Leading Role
**John Lynch – Angel Baby**; John Jarratt – All Men Are Liars; Aden Young – Metal Skin; John Moore – The Life of Harry Dare	**Jacqueline McKenzie – Angel Baby**; Caroline Gillmer – Hotel Sorrento; Caroline Goodall – Hotel Sorrento; Lisa Harrow – That Eye, the Sky
Best Performance by an Actor in a Supporting Role	Best Performance by an Actress in a Supporting Role
**Ray Barrett – Hotel Sorrento**; Noah Taylor – Dad and Dave: On Our Selection; Ben Thomas – Hotel Sorrento; Ben Mendelsohn – Metal Skin	**Amanda Douge – That Eye, the Sky**; Essie Davis – Dad and Dave: On Our Selection; Rebecca Gibney – Lucky Break; Nadine Garner – Metal Skin
Best Original Screenplay	Best Adapted Screenplay
**Michael Rymer – Angel Baby**; Gerard Lee – All Men Are Liars; Alan Madden – Mushrooms; Margot Nash – Vacant Possession	**Richard Franklin, Peter Fitzpatrick – Hotel Sorrento**; George Whaley – Dad and Dave: On Our Selection; David Williamson – Sanctuary; John Ruane, Jim Barton – That Eye, the Sky
Best Achievement in Cinematography	Best Achievement in Editing
**Ellery Ryan – Angel Baby**; Tony Clarke – Epsilon; Louis Irving – Mushrooms; Ellery Ryan – That Eye, the Sky	**Dany Cooper – Angel Baby**; David Pulbrook – Hotel Sorrento; Henry Dangar – Mushrooms; Veronika Jenet – Vacant Possession
Best Achievement in Sound	Best Original Music Score
**Frank Lipson, David Lee, Steve Burgess, Peter Burgess, Glenn Newnham – Metal Skin**; Roger Savage, Gareth Van Der Hope, Glenn Newnham, James Harvey, Lloyd Carrick – Hotel Sorrento; John Dennison, Tony Vaccher, John Patterson, David Lee – Mushrooms; Tony Vaccher, John Dennison, Bronwyn Murphy, John Patterson – Vacant Possession	**Peter Best – Dad and Dave: On Our Selection**; Nerida Tyson-Chew – Hotel Sorrento; Paul Grabowsky – Mushrooms; Christopher Gordon – Sanctuary
Best Music Score Featuring Adapted Music	Best Achievement in Production Design
**Peter Cobbin, Larry Muhoberac – Billy's Holiday**	**Steven Jones-Evans – Metal Skin**; Murray Pope – All Men Are Liars; George Liddle – Mushrooms; Chris Kennedy – That Eye, the Sky
Best Achievement in Costume Design
**Terry Ryan – Billy's Holiday**; Anna Borghesi – Metal Skin; George Liddle – Mushrooms; Vicki Friedman – That Eye, the Sky

=== Non-feature film ===
Best Documentary	Best Short Fiction Film
**The Good Looker – Claire Jager**; Pat & Eddy's Greyhound Racing Family – Brian McKenzie; Raskols – Sally Browning, Anou Borrey; Witness – Michael Buckley	**The Beat Manifesto – Daniel Nettheim**; A Dancing Foot and A Praying Knee – Andrew Sully; Hell, Texas and Home – Deborah Niski; Out – Samantha Lang
Best Short Animation	Best Screenplay in a Non-Feature Film
**Small Treasures – Sarah Watt**; Great Moments In Science: Falling Cats – Andrew Horne; The Story of Rosie Dock – Jeannie Baker; Writer's Block – Leon Cmielewski	**Tony MacNamara, Daniel Nettheim, Matthew Schulz – The Beat Manifesto**; Andrew Sully – A Dancing Foot and A Praying Knee; Steve Vidler – Hell, Texas and Home; Alexandra Long – Out
Best Achievement in Cinematography in a Non-Feature Film	Best Achievement in Editing in a Non-Feature Film
**Jun Li – Twelve Moons**; Roman Baska – Raskols; Mark Pugh – Speak Softly Please To Mrs Babajaga; Jaems Grant – The Needy and The Greedy	**Belinda Hall – Code Blue**; Nick Meyers – Lucinda, 31; Ray Argall – Pat and Eddy's Greyhound Racing Family
Best Achievement in Sound in a Non-Feature Film
**John Willsteed – The Beat Manifesto**; Liam Egan, Robert Sullivan, Alicia Slusarski – La Cloche (The Bell); Mark Ward, Mark Worth, Gethin Creagh, David Bridie, John Phillips – Raskols; Gretchen Thornburn, Livia Ruzic, Craig Carter – The Needy and The Greedy

=== Television ===
Best Television Mini-Series or Telefeature	Best Episode in a Television Drama Series
**Halifax f.p. – Series 1, "The Feeding" (Nine Network) – Roger Le Mesurier, Roger Simpson**; Cody – "A Family Affair" (Seven Network) – Sandra Levy, John Edwards; Halifax f.p. – Series 1, "Hard Corps" (Nine Network) – Roger Le Mesurier, Roger Simpson; Halifax f.p. – Series 1, "Lies of the Mind" (Nine Network) – Roger Le Mesurier, Roger Simpson	**Frontline – Season 1, Episode 5, "The Siege" (ABC) – Rob Sitch, Santo Cilauro, Jane Kennedy, Tom Gleisner**; Frontline – Season 1, Episode 8, "The Art of Gentle Persuasion" (ABC) – Rob Sitch, Santo Cilauro, Jane Kennedy, Tom Gleisner; Janus – Series 1, Episode 3, "Not on the Merits" (ABC) – Bill Hughes; Janus – Series 1, Episode 7, "Without Consent" (ABC) – Bill Hughes
Best Episode in a Television Drama Serial	Best Children's Television Drama
**Home and Away – Episode 1705 (Seven Network) – John Holmes, Russell Webb**; Echo Point – Episode 29 (Network Ten) – Sandra Levy, John Edwards; Home and Away – Episode 1683 (Seven Network) – John Holmes, Russell Webb	**The Ferals – Series 2, Episode 11, "Ratty Ratty Bang Bang!" (ABC) – Wendy Gray**; Lift Off 2 – Episodes 77/78, "From Where I Stand" (ABC) – Patricia Edgar, Susie Campbell, Sandra Alexander; Lift Off 2 – Episodes 67/68, "Out of This World" (ABC) – Patricia Edgar, Susie Campbell, Sandra Alexander; Ocean Girl 2 – Episode 13, "The Return" (Network Ten) – Jonathan M. Shiff
Best Performance by an Actor in a Leading Role in a Television Drama	Best Performance by an Actress in a Leading Role in a Television Drama
**Colin Friels – Halifax f.p. – Series 1, "Hard Corps" (Nine Network)**; **Steve Vidler – Halifax f.p. – Series 1, "Hard Corps" (Nine Network)**; Richard Roxburgh – Halifax f.p. – Series 1, "Lies of the Mind" (Nine Network); Steve Bisley – Halifax f.p. – Series 1, "The Feeding" (Nine Network); Grant Piro – Janus – Series 1, Episode 4, "A Rare Crushing Reversal" (ABC)	**Jacqueline McKenzie – Halifax f.p. – Series 1, "Lies of the Mind" (Nine Network)**; Rebecca Gibney – Halifax f.p. – Series 1, "Lies of the Mind" (Nine Network); Frances O'Connor – 'Halifax f.p. – Series 1, "The Feeding" (Nine Network); Belinda McClory – Janus – Series 1, Episode 3, "Not On The Merits" (ABC)
Best Achievement in Direction in a Television Drama	Best Screenplay in a Television Drama
**Rob Sitch, Santo Cilauro, Jane Kennedy, Tom Gleisner – Frontline – Season 1, Episode 5, "The Siege" (ABC)**; Michael Carson – Halifax f.p. – Series 1, "Hard Corps" (Nine Network); Michael Offer – Halifax f.p. – Series 1, "Lies of the Mind" (Nine Network); Steve Jodrell – Halifax f.p. – Series 1, "The Feeding" (Nine Network)	**Rob Sitch, Santo Cilauro, Jane Kennedy, Tom Gleisner – Frontline – Season 1, Episode 5, "The Siege" (ABC)**; Jan Sardi – Halifax f.p. – Series 1, "Lies of the Mind" (Nine Network); Mac Gudgeon – Halifax f.p. – Series 1, "The Feeding" (Nine Network); Cliff Green – Janus – Series 1, Episode 3, "Not on the Merits" (ABC)
Best Television Documentary
**Untold Desires – Eva Orner, Sarah Stevens (SBS)**; Harold – John Moore, Marion Crooke (ABC); Ladies Please – Rebel Penfold-Russell, Vicki Watson, Phaedon Vass; Scars – Franziska Wagenfeld

=== Additional awards ===
Raymond Longford Award	Byron Kennedy Award
**George Miller**	**Jill Bilcock**
Young Actors' Award	Best Foreign Film
**Jamie Croft – That Eye, the Sky**	**Once Were Warriors – Lee Tamahori**; Heavenly Creatures – Peter Jackson; Priest – Antonia Bird; Pulp Fiction – Quentin Tarantino
Open Craft Award
**Paul Grabowsky (for music score) – The Good Looker**; Josko Petkovic (for innovation in form) – Letter To Eros; Luigi Pittorino (for visual design) – Square One; Joel McIlroy (for lead actor) – The Beat Manifesto
