= Sergey Bermeniev =

Russian photographer

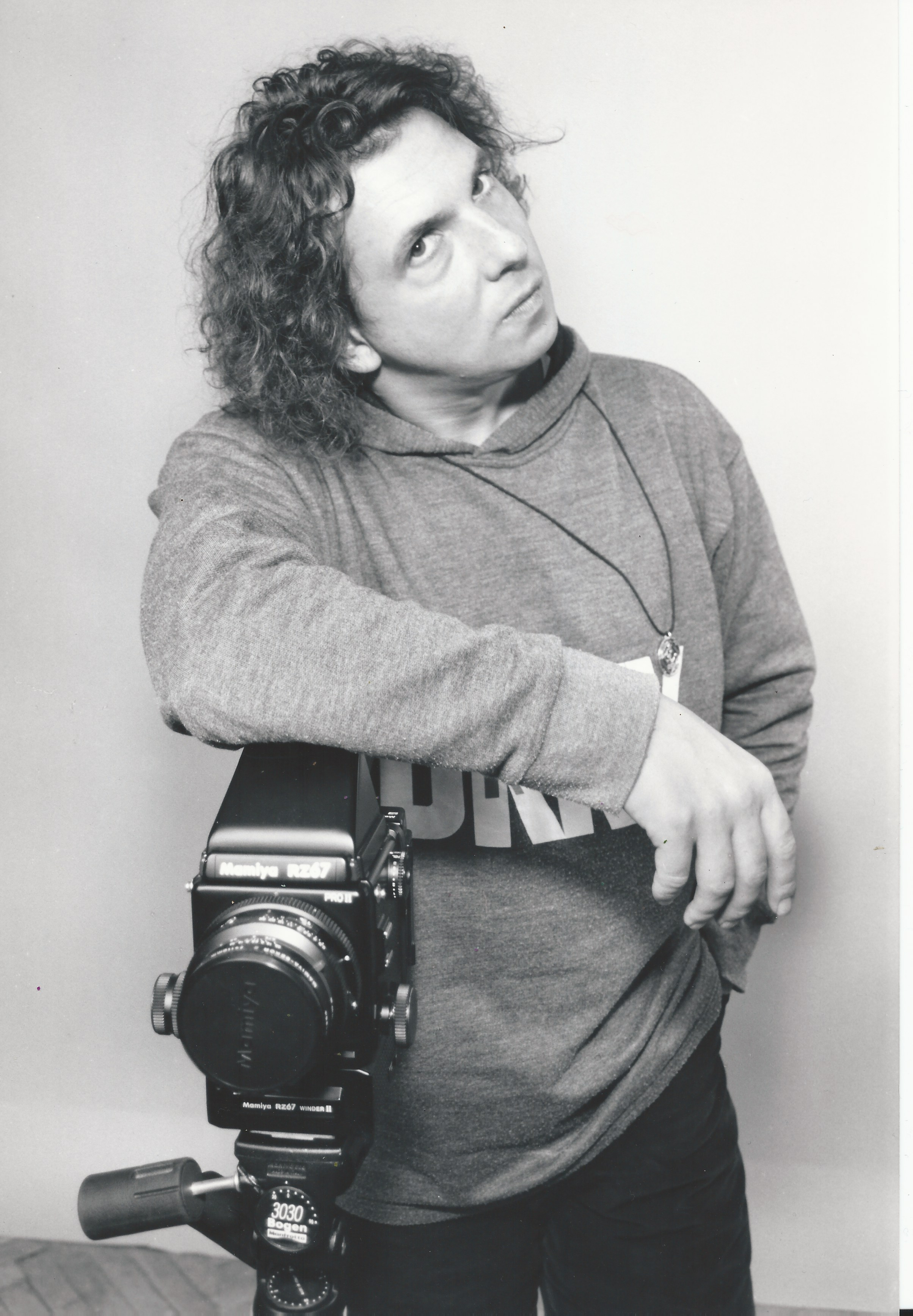
- 1996
- Born: Sergey Sergeevich Bermeniev; 8 January 1964; Moscow, USSR
- Known for: Portrait photography
- Awards: Meritial Artist of Russia, Silver Camera, Golden Eye of Russian
- Website: www.bermeniev.com

Sergey Sergeevich Bermeniev (Russian: Сергей Сергеевич Берменьев, born 8 January 1964, Moscow, USSR) — Soviet and Russian photographer, portraitist.

Meritial Artist of Russia. The author of 11 books, several solo exhibitions in Russia and abroad.

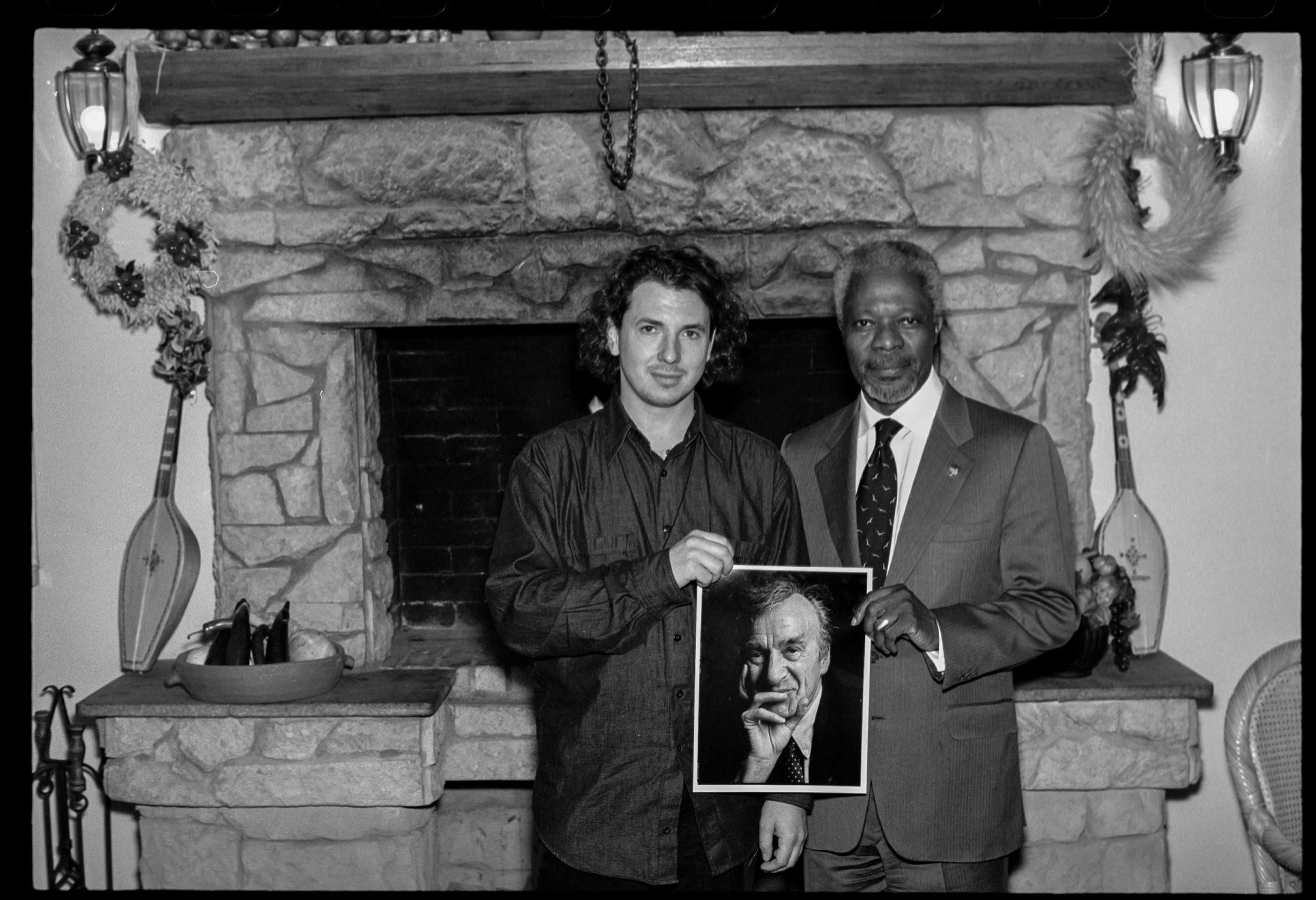
Kofi Annan & Sergey Bermeniev with a portrait of Elie Wiesel

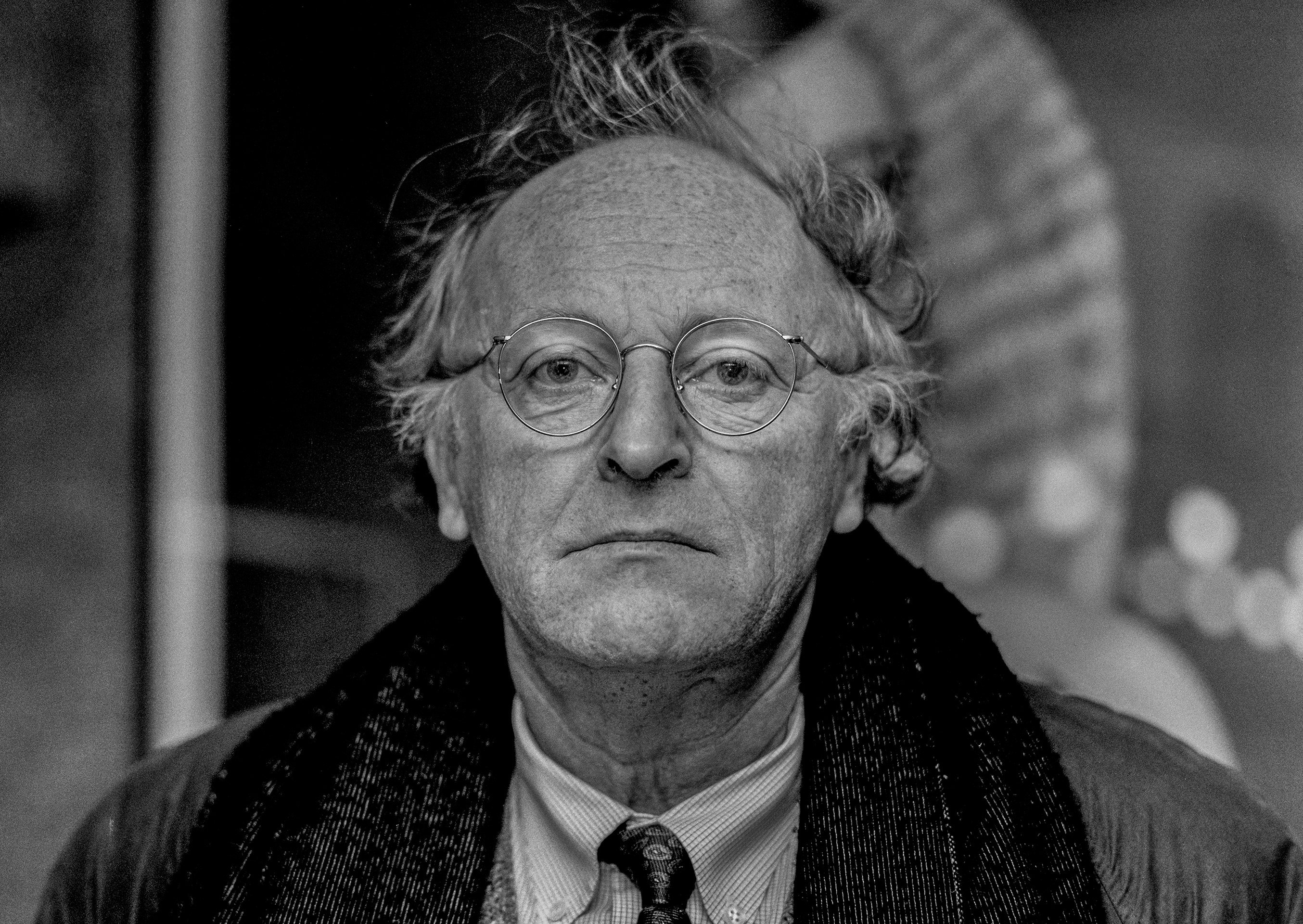
Joseph Brodsky, December 1995

== Early life and career ==
Sergey Bermeniev born in 1964 in Moscow, (USSR). After military service in the Soviet army, he graduated from the Faculty of Law of Moscow State University. Since the end of the 1970s, portrait photos of characters of spiritual culture – not only Russian, but also world ones – have appeared in his archive. In 1987, while being a student, he performed a portrait of Federico Fellini, and he presented it to Giulietta Masina, Vanessa Redgrave, Gabriel Garcia Marquez and other visiting guests of the Moscow Film Festival. Lucianno Pavarotti invited him to take pictures during his tour in Russia and chose Sergey's photo for the cover of his biography book "Life with Luciano" Sergei Bermenev repeatedly accompanied as a photographer Mstislav Rostropovich during his tours around Russia. In the 1990s, exhibitions of Sergey Bermeniev were held in foreign embassies. Sergey Bermenev – the owner of the award "Golden Eye of Russia", which was awarded to him in 2001 for a series of photographs "The General Persons of the World." Since 2002, Sergey Bermeniev was the official photographer of the UN Secretary-General Kofi Annan. In 2004 he received one of the main awards of the Silver Camera contest at the Moscow House of Photography.

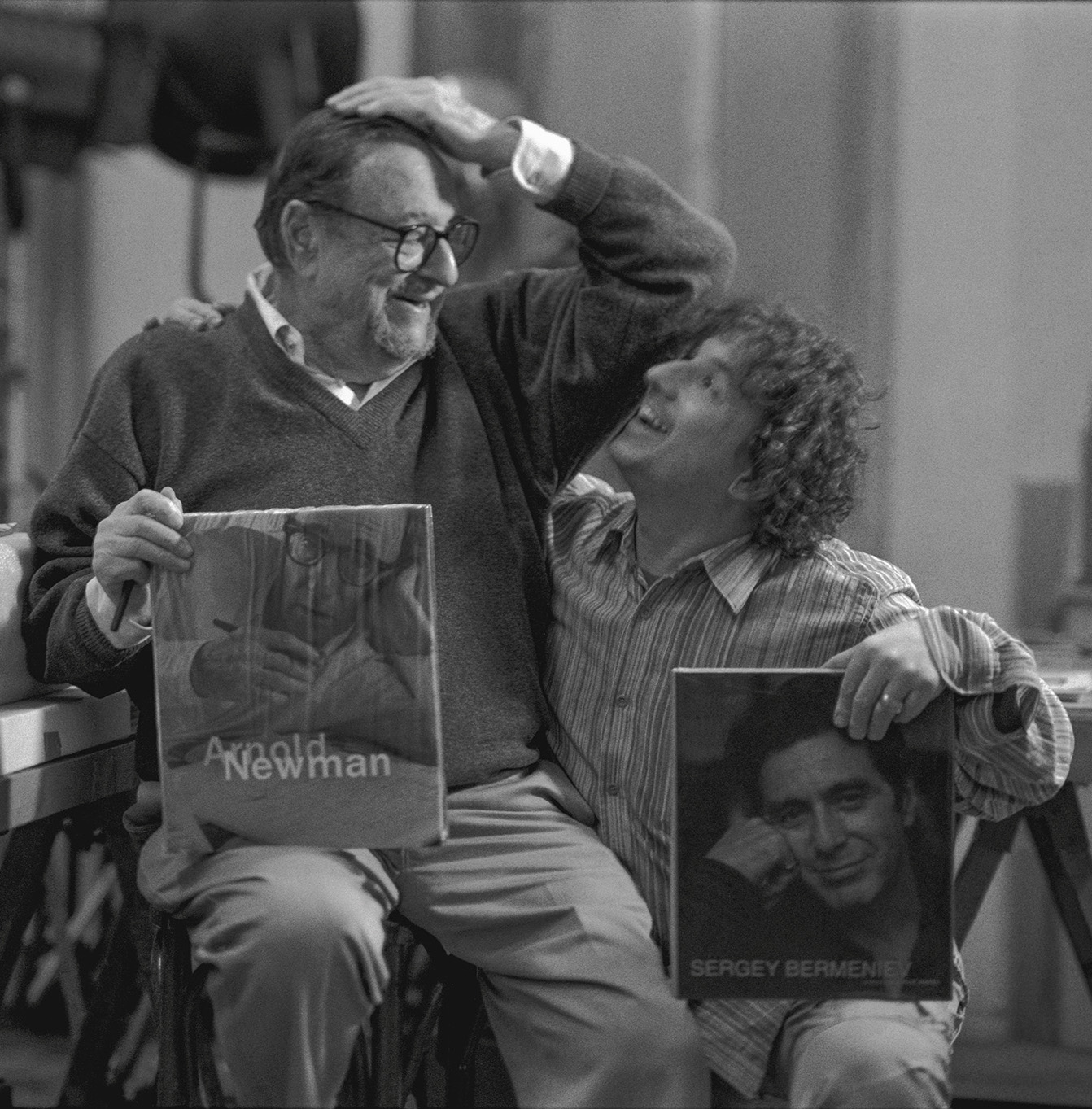
Arnold Newman with Sergey Bermeniev. March 2006

Sergey Bermeniev has taken photos of the first persons of state and Nobel Prize winners, actors and directors, writers, musicians, painters and sculptors: Meryl Streep and Quentin Tarantino, Francis Ford Coppola and Jack Nicholson, Richard Gere and Laura Bush, Liza Minnelli and Tina Turner, Al Pacino and Robert De Niro, Julio Iglesias and Mireille Mathieu, David Bowie and Luciano Pavarotti, Isaac Stern and Joseph Brodsky, Elie Wiesel and Edvard Radzinsky, Dizzy Gillespie and Evgeny Kissin, Maya Plisetskaya and Vladimir Voinovich, Gabriel Garcia Marquez and Oliver Stone – the total list includes more than 250 names of the top stars.

== Work ==
The first portrait work in 1984 was a photo session with Elena Gogoleva. Then followed the work on a series of photographs of the actors of the Russian theaters.

1986 – His photographs of Italian and French movie stars appears in Russian, French, Italian magazines.

Photos of Kathy Smith and actor/singer Kris Kristofferson.

1987 At the exhibition "Man, Humanity and Mankind" photos of Susan Eisenhower, William Roberts and Carlos Santana are presented. Same year, on the 15th annual Moscow Film Festival

Sergey works as an independent photographer.

1988 – Sergey Bermeniev accompanies Dizzy Gillespie during his tour in Russia. A series of Dizzy Gillespie pictures has been published in various magazines.

1989 – During the tour of Luciano Pavarotti, Sergey creates a series of pictures of the great tenor, which entered the autobiographical book of the singer "Pavarotti:Life with Luciano".

1991 Invited by Isaac Stern and Sony Music as an official photographer to the concert tour of Isaac Stern, which took place in the winter of 1991 in Moscow and St. Petersburg

This tour was recorded. and after released a compact disc – "Brahms Sonatas For piano and violin." Efim Bronfman & Isaak Stern "with illustrations on the cover, made by Sergey Bermeniev.

1992 Invited to the United States by Isaac Stern for the celebration of the jubilee of the French flutist Jean Pierre Rampal, at the gala concert in Ivery Fisher Hall, organized by Mstislav Rostropovich, Jacqueline Kennedy, and Isaac Stern as an official photographer. Photos were also used in the albums of Jean Pierre Rampal.

1995 – Sergey makes a famous photo of Joseph Brodsky, which was later used in many editions of Brodsky's poems.

1996–Presented by Isaac Stern, Theodore Mann, director and co-director of the New York City theater Circle in the Square .

In September, Sergey Bermenev took a series of portraits of the Hollywood star Al Pacino.

1998 – BMG Entertainment releases a CD of Evgeniy Kissin with photos made by Sergey Bermeniev – (Evgeniy Kissin – Beethoven. Moonlight sonata.Franack. Prelude Choral Et Fugue. Brahms. Paganini Variations.)

1999 – Sergey Bermeniev was invited by Mstislav Rostropovich as an official photographer for the music festival in Evian (France)

2000 – Photo exhibition and a photographic studio opened in Moscow.

2001 – Sergey Bermeniev is an official honorary photographer at the 56th General Assembly of the United Nations in New York City at the request of UN Secretary-General Kofi Annan.

2002 – In Nicaragua, a postal stamp with a portrait of the UN Secretary-General Kofi Annan was made, which was taken from the photograph of Sergey Bermeniev.

The Government of Ghana produces three post stamps with a portrait of the Nobel Peace Prize laureate, Kofi Annan from photographs of the work of Sergey Bermeniev.

2006 г Made unique photographs of one of the greatest photographer of the XX century – Arnold Newman.

2008 г.- After the portrait of the Soviet propaganda artist Boris Efimov, a new project "8Stars" (8 stars) was born. In November 2008, in the Central Exhibition Hall "Manege" in conjunction with the Moscow House of Photography, the exhibition "Tsoi and Others .." was held with great success.

2009 – In Venice and Milan, under the patronage of the First Lady of the Russian Federation Svetlana Medvedeva, the Foundation for Social and Cultural Initiatives and the Directorate of International Programs and the "National Portrait Gallery" Cultural Foundation, an exhibition "The Russian Soul of Joseph Brodsky in Photographs of Sergey Bermeniev" is dedicated to the memory of the great poet. The exposition included portraits of the last photo session of the poet. The Public Archive of photographs of the city of Milan received as a gift one of the exhibited works, which is kept in the Sforzesco Museum.

2014 – Making portrait of Armen Dzhigarkhanyan

2015 – Portrait of the Soviet cinema actor Alexey Batalov and Hollywood actor Kirk Douglas has been made.

2018 – New photo project dedicated to celebrities and people who left a mark in history of modern Russia. The first to participate in the project were popular Russian rap artists, among them Eljey, Smoky Mo, ST, Slovetsky, 104, Truwer, and also the Russian cosmonauts Yury Baturin and Oleg Skripochka, as well as famous actor and director Oleg Menshikov, star Russian cinema Danila Kozlovsky, actors of theater and cinema Kirill Zaitsev and Ivan Kolesnikov ("Move Up", 2017) Work on the photo project continues and is gaining popularity.

In 2020, in Pyatigorsk was an exhibition of new works by Sergey Bermeniev.

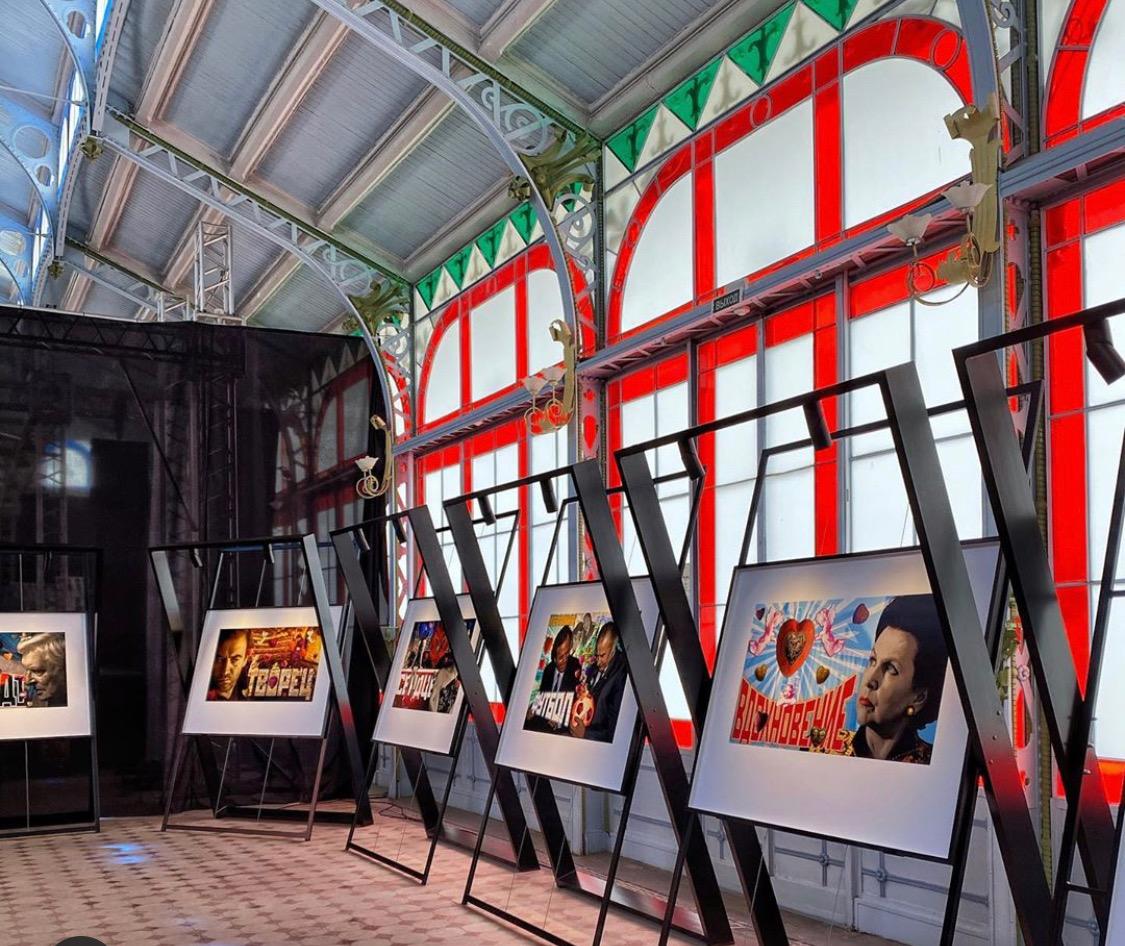
Exhibition in Pyatigorsk 2020

== Exhibitions ==
1. Exhibition "Tsoi and Others ..." in the Central Exhibition Hall Manezh (Moscow) 2008 November
2. Exhibition "The Russian soul of the poet Joseph Brodsky in the photographs of Sergey Bermeniev" (Venice) 2009 May
3. Street exhibition "Star named Tsoi" in memory of Victor Tsoi on Malaya Sadovaya street in St. Petersburg, 2012
4. Street exhibition "Country of Victory: Victory of the Country" on Pokolonnaya Hill (Moscow) 2015
5. Exhibition "Dreams Of Our Love" in The Russian Museum, (St. Peresburg) Russia, 2019
6. Exhibition in Pyatigorsk was an exhibition of new works by Sergey Bermeniev, 2020

== Books ==
1. Numero One. (2005, ISBN 88-901849-0-6)
2. 8х8. 8 stars (2010, ISBN 978-5-88149-393-6)
3. Russian soul of the poet . Brodsky. (2009, ISBN 889018492-2)
4. Tsoi & others (2011)
5. Star named Tsoi (2012)
6. Country of Victory (2014, ISBN 978-5-9906009-1-1)
7. Three days in July. Putin. G8 (2006)
8. St. Petersburg Forum, photoalbum
9. Immersion (2017, ISBN 978-88-940274-9-5)
10. Dreams of Our Love (2019)

== Book illustrations ==
1. So forth... Poems – Joseph Brodsky
2. Soros - Michael T Kaufman
3. Night - Elie Wiesel
4. Blues All Around me - B.B King
5. And the Sea Is Never Full- Elie Wiesel
6. A mad desire to dance – Elie Wiesel
7. Conversations with Elie Wiesel - Elie Wiesel & Richard D. Hefner
8. The Rasputin File - Edvard Radzinsky
9. The Sonderberg Case - Elie Wiesel
