= 1984 Australian Film Institute Awards =

1984 Australian film production awards

26th Australian Film Institute Awards
- Site: State Theatre, Victorian Arts Centre

Highlights
- Best Film: '

The 26th Australian Film Institute Awards (generally known as the AFI Awards) were held at the Victorian Arts Centre on 5 October 1984. Presented by the Australian Film Institute (AFI), the awards celebrated the best in Australian feature film, documentary and short film productions of 1984.

== Winners and nominees ==
Winners are listed first and highlighted in boldface.

=== Feature film ===
Best Film	Best Achievement in Direction
**Annie's Coming Out – Don Murray**; My First Wife – Jane Ballantyne, Paul Cox; Silver City – Joan Long; Strikebound – Miranda Bain, Timothy White	**Paul Cox – My First Wife**; Gil Brealey – Annie's Coming Out; Ken Cameron – Fast Talking; Sophia Turkiewicz – Silver City
Best Performance by an Actor in a Leading Role	Best Performance by an Actress in a Leading Role
**John Hargreaves – My First Wife**; Drew Forsythe – Annie's Coming Out; Ivar Kants – Silver City; Chris Haywood – Strikebound	**Angela Punch-McGregor – Annie's Coming Out**; Wendy Hughes – My First Wife; Gosia Dobrowolska – Silver City; Carol Burns – Strikebound
Best Performance by an Actor in a Supporting Role	Best Performance by an Actress in a Supporting Role
**Steve Bisley – Silver City**; David Argue – BMX Bandits; Steve Bisley – Fast Talking; Peter Hehir – Fast Talking	**Anna Jemison-Monticelli – Silver City**; Monica Maughan – Annie's Coming Out; Sandy Gore – Street Hero; Peta Toppano – Street Hero
Best Original Screenplay	Best Screenplay Adapted from Another Source
**Paul Cox, Bob Ellis – My First Wife**; Ken Cameron – Fast Talking; Sophia Turkiewicz, Thomas Keneally – Silver City; Jan Sardi – Street Hero	**John Patterson, Chris Borthwick – Annie's Coming Out**; Patrick Edgeworth – BMX Bandits; Everett De Roche – Razorback; Richard Lowenstein – Strikebound
Best Achievement in Cinematography	Best Achievement in Editing
**Dean Semler – Razorback**; Yuri Sokol – My First Wife; John Seale – Silver City; Andrew de Groot – Strikebound	**William Anderson – Razorback**; Alan Lake – BMX Bandits; Tim Lewis – My First Wife; Jill Bilcock – Strikebound
Best Achievement in Sound	Best Original Music Score
**Gary Wilkins, Mark Wasiutak, Roger Savage, Bruce Lamshed, Terry Rodman, David Harrison – Street Hero**; Andrew Steuart, John Patterson, Robyn Judge, Phil Judd, Gethin Creagh – BMX Bandits; Tim Lloyd, Ron Purvis, Peter Fenton, Phil Heywood, Greg Bell, Helen Brown, Ashley Grenville – Razorback; Dean Gawen, Gethin Creagh, Frank Lipson, Martin Oswin, Rex Watts – Strikebound	**Garth Porter, Bruce Smeaton – Street Hero**; Simon Walker – Annie's Coming Out; Iva Davies – Razorback; William Motzing – Silver City
Best Achievement in Production Design	Best Achievement in Costume Design
**Tracy Watt, Harry Zettel, McGregor Knox, Neil Angwin – Strikebound**; Bryce Walmsley – Razorback; Igor Nay – Silver City; Brian Thomson – Street Hero	**Jan Hurley – Silver City**; Ross Major – One Night Stand; Norma Moriceau – Street Hero; Jennie Tate – Strikebound

=== Non-feature film ===
Best Documentary Film	Best Sponsored Documentary
**Kemira: Diary of a Strike – Tom Zubrycki (producer / director)**; Antarctic Man: 'This Is Not A Place For Humans' – ABC Natural History Unit (production company), David Parer (producer / director); Celso and Cora – Gary Kildea (producer / director); For Love or Money – Margot Oliver, Megan McMurchy, Jeni Thornley (producer), Megan McMurchy, Jeni Thornley (director), Margot Nash (editor)	
Best Short Fiction Film	Best Animated Film
**Getting Wet – Australian Film & Television School (production company), P. J. Hogan (director)**; A Girl's Own Story – Australian Film & Television School (production Company), Jane Campion (director); Every Day, Every Night – Swinburne Film & Television School (production company), Kathy Mueller (director); Skipping Class – Chris Warner (producer / director)	
Best Experimental Film	Best Achievement in Direction
**Passionless Moments – Jane Campion, Gerard Lee, AFTS**; Brick and Tile – Paul Winkler; Holzwege: Wood Roads/Wrong Ways – Georgia Wallace-Crabbe, Swinburne Film and Television School; Fear of Life – Sally Bongers, AFTS	
Best Screenplay	Best Achievement in Cinematography
Best Achievement in Editing	Best Achievement in Sound

=== Additional awards ===
Bryon Kennedy Award
- Roger Savage
Raymond Longford Award
- David Willams (Exhibitor / Distributor)
