= Mushrooms (1995 film) =

- Directed by: Alan Madden
- Written by: Alan Madden
- Produced by: Brian Rosen
- Starring: Julia Blake; Simon Chilvers; Lynette Curran
- Cinematography: Louis Irving
- Edited by: Henry Dangar
- Music by: Paul Grabowsky
- Distributed by: United International Pictures
- Release date: 20 July 1995
- Running time: 99 minutes
- Country: Australia
- Language: English

Mushrooms is a 1995 Australian comedy film written and directed by Alan Madden.

== Cast ==
- Julia Blake as Flo
- Simon Chilvers as Instep
- Lynette Curran as Minnie
- Brandon Burke as Lynch
- George Shevtsov as Corris
- Boris Brkic as Grubb
- John Gaden as Reverend Branigan
- Natalie McCurry as Maureen
- Berynn Schwerdt as Flynn
- Clarrie Thane as Constable Barnes
- Christina Andersson as Mrs. Barnes
- Kosta Trikaliotis as Constable Dimitrio
- Barbara Gouskos as Mrs. Dimitrio
- Tommy Dysart as Wilson
- Nick Salakis as Constable Andrews
- William Clark as Choir Master

== Reception ==
The Age's Tom Ryan gave it a 2/3 star (Good viewing) review writing "The direction is generally assured, the wit is disarming, and 'Mushrooms' (whose title will remain unexplained) is graced by winning performances from three of Australia's best "grey power" character actors. Only in the later stages, when Madden unnecessarily busies himself with some extraneous plot material, does the film seem to lose its way. And even if the punch-line is predictable, it's also delectable in its neat intertwining of plot denouement and character resolution." Also writing for the Age Barbara Creed said "Although Mushrooms is generally amusing, it fails to reach its full potential as a black comedy because the characters of Minnie and Flo (their names say it all) are, basically, too nice. After several scenes, they become thoroughly predictable consequently, the script has to rely, more and more, on repetition of the main gag for laughs."

John Hartl of The Seattle Times wrote "if you respond to the veteran performers, who have appeared in many Australian films, stage productions and television series, "Mushrooms" will go down easily enough." Jay Carr reviewed it for The Boston Globe concluding "At times, the comedy threatens to lose momentum, but it rallies nicely at the end. First-time director Alan Madden also makes the film's eccentricity-relishing tone part of what's fun about watching it."

== Awards ==
- 1995 AFI Awards
  - Best Original Screenplay - Alan Madden - nominated
  - Best Original Music Score - Paul Grabowsky - nominated
  - Best Cinematography - Louis Irving - nominated
  - Best Editing - Henry Dangar - nominated
  - Best Sound - John Dennison, Tony Vaccher, John Patterson, David Lee - nominated
  - Best Production Design - George Liddle - nominated
  - Best Costume Design - George Liddle - nominated
