= Shilo McClean =

Shilo McClean is an Australian writer, researcher, public speaker, consultant.

== Career ==
Shilo designs and conducts seminars, workshops, and lectures for industry and tertiary courses in filmmaking, digital visual effects, architecture and storycraft.

She has a PhD from the University of Technology, Sydney and is a graduate of the Australian Film Television and Radio School.

She is a consultant to the Screen NSW Digital Visual Effects Scheme, Chair of Sydney ACM SIGGRAPH (Professional Chapter) and was Digital Strand Curator for the 2006 & 2007 Sydney Film Festivals, producing and directing a series of podcasts for the Festival site in 2006. She continued her work with the Festival as a pre-selector for the Dendy Awards in 2009.

In April 2008, she was the keynote speaker for the Norwegian Film Institute’s Digital Storytelling Conference and jury member for the Norwegian Best Visual Effects awards. In June 2008, she was the keynote speaker for Framework: create – an event and forum for games and convergent industries. In November 2009, she spoke at the Creative Industries Innovation Centre’s Screen Business- Global Trends event. In March 2010, she was a speaker at Arts NSW’s Creative Industries Focus Group Workshop and a participant in the Digital Sydney Forum in May 2010.

Her consulting and editorial work ranges from digital image curation for games developers, strategic advice on educational/media ICT development and digital content, and the development of strategy documents and reporting in the areas of digital media/ICT. She is the editor for the Network Insight Institute and the author of various articles for industry publications including the chapter on digital visual effects for the Screen Australia's production management ‘Satchel’.

She worked with Ausfilm in the development of its international Factsheet series for filmmakers and with NICTA on its 2020 Vision and Annual Reports 2009.

From July 2016 Shilo took on the role of Head of UTS Animal Logic Academy, a joint industry/education setup as a professionally equipped studio space engineered to the highest industry standards. Starting in 2017, the UTS ALA will deliver the first industry-led post graduate degree of its kind in Australia, a Masters of Animation and Visualisation (MAV).

== Books ==
- The Digital Playing Fields: New Rulz for Film, Art and Performance Currency House (2010) ISBN 978-0-9805632-8-3
- Digital Storytelling: The Narrative Power of Visual Effects in Film. MIT Press (2008) ISBN 0-262-63369-8
- So What's This All About Then: a Non-user's Guide for Digital Effects in Film. Australian Film, Television & Radio School (1998) ISBN 1-876351-05-5

== Articles ==
- Building Bridges, Not Falling Through Cracks: what we’ve learned from ten years of Australian DVFx Traineeships. SIGGRAPH 2009.
- Children of the e•volution: the curator’s role in the user-led content revolution. Communications Policy & Research Forum 2006.
- Mapping the ‘Verse: three case studies identifying emerging models of user-generated content. Communications Policy & Research Forum 2007.
- Resourcing School: re- thinking education in a connected world. Communications Policy & Research Forum 2008.
- FutureYou: documentary in a YouTube world. Film Australia/Screen West, 2008.

== Filmography ==
- 2002, Adding Strings To Your Bow. 60 minute documentary, Producer/Director
- 2001, How Long Is A Piece Of String. 50 minute documentary, Producer/Director.
- 1999, The Zipper, Digital short, Post-production Producer, selected Cannes Film Festival 1999
- 1998, The Tichborne Claimant. UK feature film, 2nd Unit production
- Dreaming of Freedom. Independent short film, Writer/Director/Producer
- 1994, The Beat Manifesto. Short film - Winner 3 AFI Awards, screened Cannes, Venice, Cork, Aspen, Singapore, Montreal, Toronto, Dakino, Goteborg, St. Kilda and Henri Langlois International Film Festivals, Producer
- Out. Short film, nominated Dendy and AFI awards, Line Producer.
- Desire Lines. Short film, NSWFTO Young filmmakers fund, Producer.
- Smoked Oysters. Music Video, Producer.
