= The Beat Manifesto =

- Directed by: Daniel Nettheim
- Written by: Tony McNamara; Daniel Nettheim; Mat Schulz
- Produced by: Shilo T. McClean
- Starring: Joel McIlroy; Ralph Cotterill
- Cinematography: Moira Moss
- Edited by: Roland Gallois
- Music by: Lloyd Swanton
- Release date: 1995
- Running time: 18 minutes
- Country: Australia
- Language: English

The Beat Manifesto is a 1995 Australian short film written by Tony McNamara, Daniel Nettheim and Mat Schulz and directed by Nettheim. It was an Australian Film, Television and Radio School graduation production.

== Plot ==
A young farmer leaves his farm to become a real poet.

== Cast ==
- Joel McIlroy as Hamish
- Ralph Cotterill as Darcy
- Melanie de Ferranti as Francoise
- Alex Morcos as Terry
- Steven Vidler as cop
- Peter Carmody as cop

== Reception ==
Writing in the senses of cinema, Jonathan Dawson gave it a positive review noting its "genuine wit, style and a solid narrative." When broadcast by the ABC as part of The Australian Collection 1996 the Age's Fiona Scott-Norman called it "a deliciously shot and measured parody". Also in the Age Jim Schembri states "its takes on artistic pretention and the nature of art are so sharp you could cut yourself on them." Marg O'Shea of Filmnews said it was "an affectionite overblown tale of poetic larceny".

== Awards ==
- 1995 AFI Awards
  - Best Short Fiction Film - Daniel Nettheim - won
  - Best Screenplay in a Non-Feature Film - Tony MacNamara, Daniel Nettheim, Matthew Schulz - won
  - Best Achievement in Sound in a Non-Feature Film - John Willsteed - won
