= The Rage in Placid Lake =

- DVD cover
- Directed by: Tony McNamara
- Written by: Tony McNamara
- Produced by: Marian McGowan
- Starring: Ben Lee; Rose Byrne; Miranda Richardson; Garry McDonald; Nicholas Hammond
- Cinematography: Ellery Ryan
- Edited by: Lee Smith
- Music by: Cezary Skubiszewski
- Release date: 2003
- Running time: 89 minutes
- Country: Australia
- Language: English
- Box office: $482,798

The Rage in Placid Lake is a 2003 Australian comedy film written and directed by Tony McNamara and starring Ben Lee and Rose Byrne. It features Placid Lake (Lee), a seventeen-year-old boy who has led a suburban hippie life with his neurotic, free loving parents. The film documents his journey of self-discovery as he rejects his hippie roots and embraces the mundane by working for an insurance agency, much to his parents' horror.

== Synopsis ==
Precocious bohemian teenager Placid Lake finishes high school, but after having an existential crisis devises a plan to totally reinvent himself as a functioning member of society. With a few weeks spent reading a library of self-help manuals, Lake gets a haircut, buys a bespoke suit, and finds a white collar job at an insurance agency. Lake has a smart friend Gemma (Rose Byrne) who tries to talk him out of his newly found economic rationalism.

Lake is adamant about becoming an acceptable member of society and ignores the signs of disapproval from his parents and best friend. Yet, by continuing his venture to normality, Lake struggles with what to say, think, and wear due to his insecurity and neurosis. Lake realizes that living to society's standards does not satisfy him as much as he had hoped. Eventually, this causes him to revert to his original personality and become content with who he is.

== Cast ==
- Ben Lee as Placid Lake
- Rose Byrne as Gemma Taylor
- Miranda Richardson as Sylvia Lake
- Garry McDonald as Doug Lake
- Nicholas Hammond as Bill Taylor
- Toby Schmitz as Bull
- Felix Williamson
- Johnny Lockwood as Barber
- Helen Thomson as Teacher 1

== Box office ==
The Rage in Placid Lake grossed $482,798 at the box office in Australia.

== Reception ==
Based on 15 reviews collected by the film review aggregator Rotten Tomatoes, 53% of critics gave The Rage in Placid Lake a positive review, with an average rating of 6.1/10.

== Awards ==
Award	Category	Subject	Result
AACTA Award	Best Film	Marian McGowan	Nominated
AACTA Award	Best Adapted Screenplay	Tony McNamara	Won
AACTA Award	Best Actress	Rose Byrne	Nominated
AACTA Award	Best Supporting Actress	Miranda Richardson	Nominated

== See also ==
- Cinema of Australia
