= Act3animation =

Australian animation studio

- Type: Private company
- Industry: CGI animation, Visual effects
- Founded: 1992; 34 years ago
- Founder: Mike Hollands
- Headquarters: Melbourne, Australia
- Key people: Mike Hollands
- Website: www.act3animation.com

Act3animation, or Act3 for short, is an Australian CGI company, specialising in character animation, based in Melbourne, Victoria. Founded in 1992 by current creative director, Mike Hollands, Act3 has produced various TVCs, FMVs and short films.

== History ==
After being founded in 1992, Act3 produced TVCs and promotional shorts up until 1999 when they broke into the video game industry with an E3 promotional cinematic for Blue Tongue Entertainment's Starship Troopers (2000), which won the AEAF Award for Best Game Animation that year. Subsequent notable game cinematics include: Jurassic Park: Operation Genesis (2003), RoadKill (2003), N.A.R.C., Gauntlet: Seven Sorrows (2005), Neverwinter Nights 2 (2006) and Fury (2007).

In 2005, Act3 made its short film debut with two films: Anaka, a short film made to promote the game franchise of the same name made by fellow Melburnians Tantalus Media, and the award-winning tragicomedy Piñata, which has been screened at various international animation festivals, most notably the Annecy International Animated Film Festival.

In December 2006 Deakin University launched Motion.Lab – an $800,000 24-camera Motion Analysis brand motion capture studio at its campus in Burwood, Victoria, with which Act3 is partnered: managing and executing its commercial captures.

In 2014, Act3 produced the web series Bup & Endo. Created, written and directed by Mike Hollands, episodes were released weekly on the YouTube channel of the same name.
