= Shh. (2001 film) =

AFI Award-winning short film

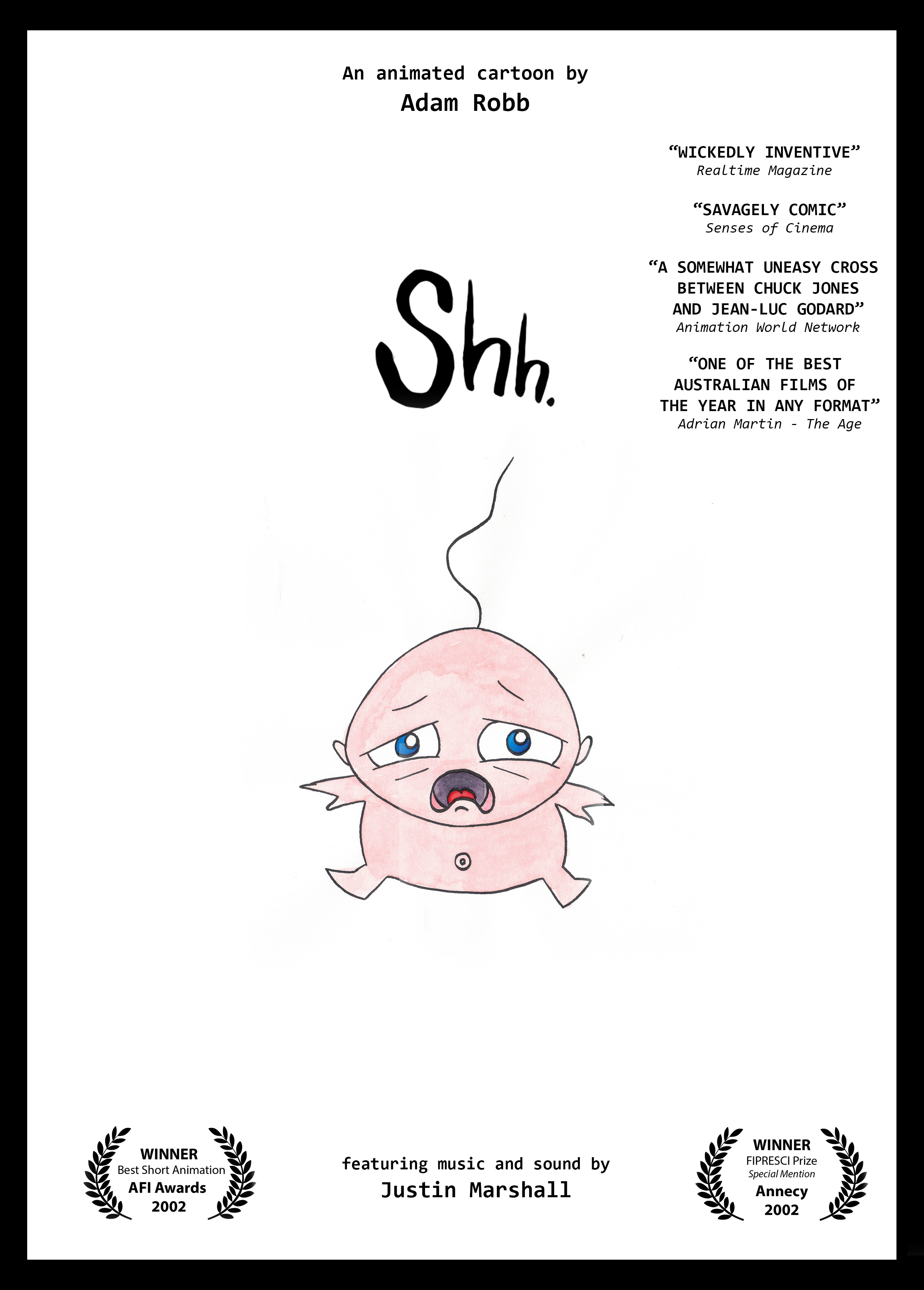
- Shh. Promo Poster
- Directed by: Adam Robb
- Written by: Adam Robb
- Produced by: Andi Spark; Paul Fletcher
- Music by: Justin Marshall
- Animation by: Adam Robb
- Production companies: VCA School of Film and Television
- Release date: 12 December 2001 (Australia)
- Running time: 5 mins
- Country: Australia
- Language: English
- Budget: A$1268

Shh. is a 2001 Australian animated short film written and directed by Adam Robb, and featuring original music by Justin Marshall. Robb made the 2D hand-drawn animation as his major production while studying animation under Andi Spark and Paul Fletcher at the Victorian College of the Arts School of Film and Television.

Shh. premiered at the VCA School of Film and Television Graduate Screenings on December 12, 2001, where it won the Village Roadshow Pictures award for Best Production. In 2002 and 2003 the film was screened internationally at over a dozen film festivals. It won several major awards, including the 2002 AFI Award for Best Short Animation, the 2002 St. Kilda Film Festival Audience Choice Award, and the FIPRESCI Prize (Special Mention) at the 2002 Annecy International Animated Film Festival, "for the clarity and subtlety with which it...used animation to express its message."

Robb said he aimed to combine "the political, the personal and the bizarre" in order "to make audiences think."

== Plot ==
A cartoonist attempts to soothe a crying baby by painting various distractions. When this fails, the cartoonist travels inside the child's head to discover a range of intractable social issues swirling around, and responds by painting humorous, but increasingly unsatisfactory, solutions to each.

== Reception ==
The Age film critic Adrian Martin, who attended the VCA Graduate Films screening, described the film as a "fond homage to Chuck Jones" and concluded "Shh. is one of the best Australian films of the year in any format."

After seeing Shh. at the 2002 Melbourne International Film Festival, Jim Knox from Senses of Cinema wrote that he was pleasantly surprised at the "savagely comic" animation, describing it as "among the most intelligent and artfully composed works which will screen in this Festival."

Reviewing the finalists for the 2002 AFI Awards, Keith Gallasch at Realtime Arts Magazine named Shh. as his pick to win, writing "it was a pleasure to see an animation with political drive, focussed inventiveness, satirical wit and a vigorous playfulness with its own conventions"

Jon Hoffernan at Animation World Magazine lauded Robb's skills at hand-drawn animation but was less impressed with the attempt at social critique inside the baby's mind, describing the film as an "uneasy cross between Chuck Jones and Jean-Luc Godard" and writing that "while suggestive and admirably ambitious" the film was "more confusing than illuminating".
