= Dirk de Bruyn =

Australian experimental filmmaker and academic

- Born: 14 October 1950 (age 75); Dordrecht, Netherlands
- Occupations: Filmmaker, academic
- Known for: Experimental animation, expanded cinema, trauma in film

Academic background
- Education: Deakin University, RMIT University, Philip Institute

Dirk de Bruyn (born 14 October 1950) is a Dutch-born Australian experimental filmmaker, animator, curator, and academic. He is recognized for his contributions to avant-garde moving-image art, expanded cinema, and independent animation. Over a career spanning more than four decades, his work has heavily focused on the physical materiality of film, structural editing techniques, and the cinematic exploration of personal trauma, migration, and cultural memory. Born in Dordrecht, Netherlands, de Bruyn immigrated to Australia with his family in 1958, an experience of displacement that deeply informed the thematic foundation of his later films. He became a foundational figure in the Australian underground film movement during the 1970s and 1980s, advocating for low-budget, self-funded, and "no-budget" artistic independence. De Bruyn was a founding member and past president of Modern Image Makers Association (MIMA), which later evolved into Experimenta, and was actively involved with alternative screening networks like the Melbourne Super 8 Film Group and the Fringe Network. In addition to his creative practice, de Bruyn has maintained a prominent career in arts education and film theory. He taught animation at the Emily Carr College of Art and Design in Vancouver, Canada, during the early 1990s before returning to Australia. He later served as an Associate Professor and the Head of Screen and Design at Deakin University in Melbourne, where he lectured on animation and digital culture until his retirement. He was ranked third in the Melbourne Independent Filmmakers' Top 50 Australian Independent Film Heroes (2007).

In January 1986, a program of de Bruyn's short films was presented at the Museum of Modern Art in New York as part of its Cineprobe series.

In 2013, the Film-Philosophy Conference in Amsterdam hosted a panel titled Trauma/Memory/Expanded Cinema: The Films of Dirk de Bruyn.

Full retrospective programs of his films have been screened at:

- Lux Salon London (2004)
- Liaison of Independent Filmmakers Toronto (2014)
- Melbourne International Animation Festival (2016)
- Punto y Raya Festival at ZKM Karlsruhe (2016)
- Cineinfinito (Spain, 2019–2020)
- The Melbourne Cinémathèque (2025)

== Academic work ==
De Bruyn served as Head of Screen and Design at Deakin University (2017–2019). His research interests include:

- Experimental animation
- Trauma and memory in film
- Surveillance and pattern recognition

=== Selected publications ===
==== Books ====
- The Performance of Trauma in Moving Image Art (2014)

==== Journal articles ====
- "Re-animating the Lost Objects d'Childhood and the Everyday: Jan Švankmajer", Senses of Cinema Issue 14 (2001)
- "Old Tom New Tom", Vital Signs: Creative Practice & New Media Now (2005)
- "Performing the 1950s New Australian", Scan | Journal of Media Arts Culture V.10 No.1 (2013)
- "Re-processing The Mystical Rose", Animation Studies (2016)
- "Chasing Rabbits out of the Hat and into the SHEDding of Childhood: Alice", Senses of Cinema Issue 86 (2018)
- "Paul Winkler: Migrating from Analogue to Digital Practice", Animation Practice, Process & Production (2021)
- "Fear of the Dark", Senses of Cinema (2021)
- "The Beauty of the Fragment Reconstituted in the Great Wall", International Journal of Film and Media Arts Vol. 6 No. 2 (2021)
- "Repetition, Flicker, and Sound in the Films of Paul Sharits", Animation Studies (2020)
- "Bedding Down Precarity: John Smith's Hotel Diaries", New Review of Film and Television Studies (2025)

== Selected filmography ==
=== Feature films ===
- Looking for Birrarung (extended) (2020)
- Telescope (2016)
- A X Canada (1995) – An 80-minute avant-garde Super 8 film tracking a journey across Canada and North America.
- Conversations with my Mother (1990)

=== Short films ===
- Sketches (2026)
- Thought/Action (2026)
- Traceless Traces (2025)
- Flinders (2025)
- Father of Waters (2022)
- White Bat (2021)
- Living in the Past (2018)
- Death of Place (annotated) (2018)
- Recover (2018)
- Dissociation (2017)
- Re-vue (2017–18)
- New Australian (2016)
- Found Found Found (2014)
- Empire (2014)
- WAP (2012)
- Traum A Dream (2002)
- Doubt (1995)
- Rote Movie (1994)
- Vision (1985)
- 224 (1985)
- 223 (1985)
- Feyers (1979)

=== Expanded cinema performances ===
Dirk de Bruyn's expanded cinema performances engage the aesthetics of process through multi-screen abstract films and live manipulations. They include:

- Experiments (1982) - 2 projector Performance Melbourne Film Festival
- LanterNfanten (2009) - 3-projector at Impakt Festival, Utrecht, Netherlands
- Analog Stress (2009) – Tokyo Metropolitan Museum of Photography (Yebisu Festival)
- Hillegonda (2011) – 2-projector performance, Elisabeth de Brabant Gallery, Shanghai, China
- i1234m (2013) – 3-screen performance, Gertrude Street Galleries
- Multitudes (2014) – Immersive light/music performance, Melbourne
- Material Damage (2016) – 4-projector performance, Punto y Raya Festival
- i1234m (2025) – 2 projector and 1 slide performance, Drill Hall Gallery, Canberra ANU

== Awards and recognition ==
- 2019–20 – Retrospective at Cineinfinito, Spain
- 2018 – Night Award, Signes de Nuit Festival (Recover)
- 2016 – Retrospective at Punto y Raya Festival
- 2010 – Research Fellowship, National Film and Sound Archive
- 2009 – Vice-Chancellor’s Award for Research, Deakin University
- 1994 - Rote Movie awarded best experimental film at Ann Arbor
