= Vacant Possession (film) =

- Directed by: Margot Nash
- Written by: Margot Nash
- Produced by: John Winter
- Starring: Pamela Rabe; John Stanton; Toni Scanlan; Tommy Lewis; Tony Barry
- Cinematography: Dion Beebe
- Edited by: Veronika Jenet
- Music by: Alistair Jones
- Distributed by: Wintertime Films
- Release date: 23 May 1995 (Australia)
- Running time: 95 minutes
- Country: Australia
- Language: English

Vacant Possession is a 1995 Australian drama film directed and written by Margot Nash and starring Pamela Rabe and John Stanton. The film was nominated for 5 awards at the 1995 Australian Film Institute Awards.

== Plot ==
Following the death of her mother Tessa (Pamela Rabe), a young woman, returns after many years to the weather-beaten family home on the shores of Sydney's Botany Bay. But the old family home begins to bring old wounds more and more to life. The story unfolds through flashbacks yet as it progresses the flashbacks merge into the present as it becomes apparent that the situation Tessa has returned to is very much the result of that which passed before.

== Cast ==
- Pamela Rabe...Tessa
- John Stanton...Frank
- Toni Scanlan...Joyce
- Linden Wilkinson...Kate
- Rita Bruce...Aunty Beryl
- Olivia Patten...Millie
- Simonne Pengelly...Teenage Tessa
- Melissa Ippolito...Young Tessa
- Fiona Gabb...Teenage Kate
- Shelly McShane...Young Kate
- Tommy Lewis...Billy
- Bill Young...Estate Agent
- Barbra Wyndon...Thea
- Tony Barry...Salvation Army Man
- Ian Spence...Volunteer
- Graeme Moore...Mitch

== Awards ==
Nominations

- Australian Film Institute 1995:
  - AFI Award - Best Editing: Veronika Jenet
  - AFI Award - Best Director: Margot Nash
  - AFI Award - Best Screenplay: Margot Nash
  - AFI Award - Best Achievement in Sound: Tony Vaccher, John Dennison, Bronwyn Murphy & John Patterson
