= Tony McNamara (writer) =

Australian playwright, screenwriter, and producer

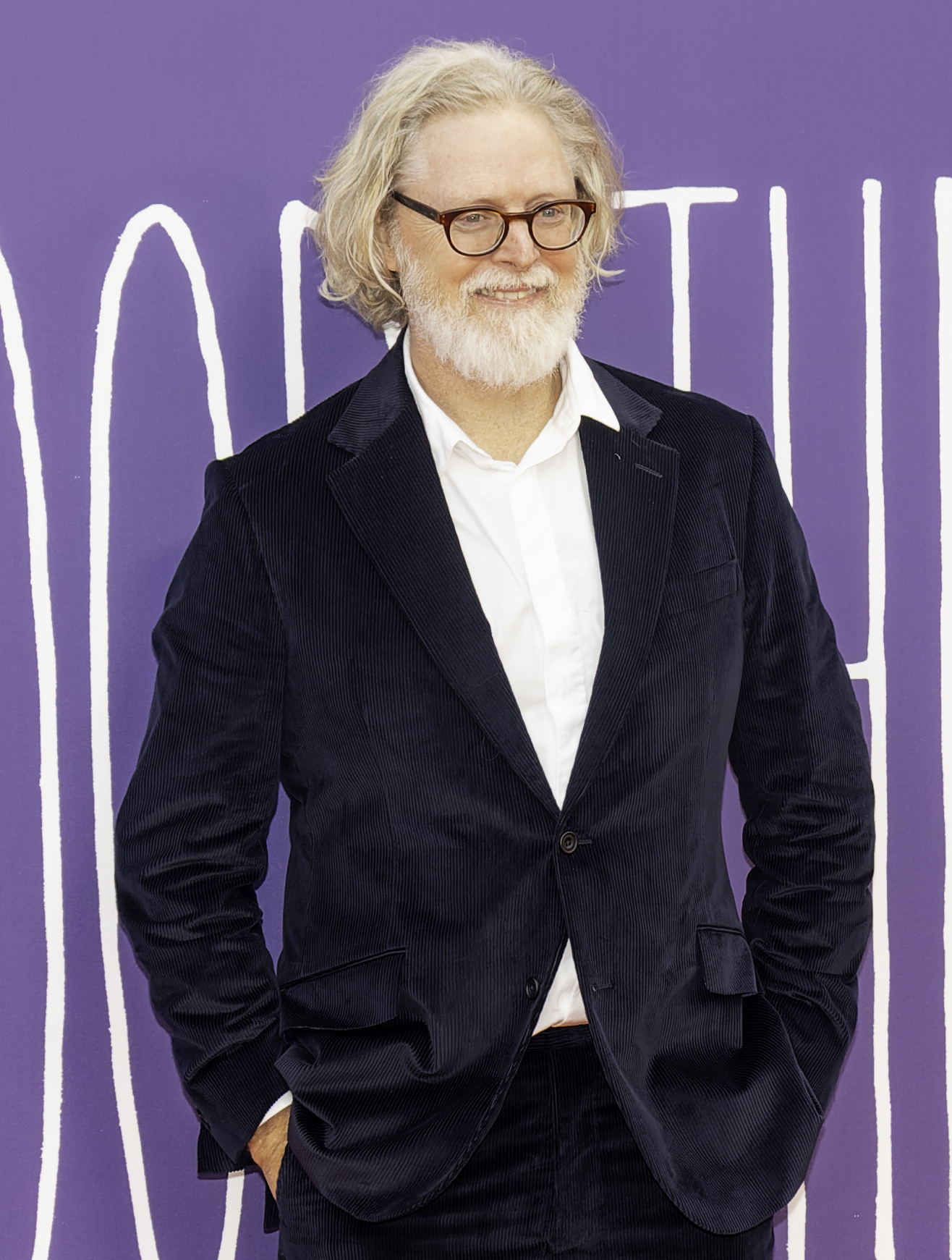
- McNamara at the 2023 BFI London Film Festival
- Born: 1967 (age 58–59); Kilmore, Victoria, Australia
- Occupations: Playwright, screenwriter, television producer, film director, film producer
- Years active: 1993–present
- Known for: The Favourite; The Great; Cruella; Poor Things
- Spouse: Unknown (divorced) Belinda Bromilow (m. 2009)
- Children: 3

Tony McNamara (born 1967) is an Australian playwright, screenwriter, and television producer. He is also an occasional film director and producer. He is known for his work on the scripts for The Favourite (2018) and Poor Things (2023), two films directed by Yorgos Lanthimos, being nominated for the Academy Award for Best Original Screenplay with Deborah Davis for the former and the Academy Award for Best Adapted Screenplay for the latter. On television, he created the comedy-drama series The Great (2020–2023).

== Life and career ==
=== Early years and education ===
Tony McNamara was born in 1967 in Kilmore, in the state of Victoria, Australia, and was educated at Assumption College, Kilmore. Following careers in catering and finance, McNamara settled on a career as a writer following a visit to Rome. He studied writing at the Royal Melbourne Institute of Technology and screenwriting at the Australian Film, Television and Radio School.

=== Career ===
After writing various television episodes and stage plays, McNamara made his film debut in 2003 directing The Rage in Placid Lake, adapted from his stage play The Café Latte Kid. Following this, he wrote for various television programmes in Australia, most notably The Secret Life of Us, Love My Way, Tangle and Puberty Blues.

In 2015, McNamara directed his second feature film, comedy-drama Ashby, starring Mickey Rourke, Sarah Silverman and Emma Roberts. A year later, he returned to television as creator of medical drama Doctor Doctor.

In 2018, he received critical acclaim for his work in co-writing the historical comedy-drama film The Favourite with Yorgos Lanthimos, starring Emma Stone. Originally a screenplay by Deborah Davis written 20 years prior to the film's release, Lanthimos and McNamara worked together to complete the final script.

McNamara created The Great, a series revolving around the life of Catherine the Great, starring Elle Fanning and Nicholas Hoult, which premiered on Hulu on 15 May 2020. It is based on his play about Catherine the Great, which premiered at the Sydney Theatre Company in 2008. McNamara also wrote a film adaptation of the play.

McNamara returned to work with Lanthimos as the writer for the 2023 film Poor Things, with Stone as the lead actress once again.

In April 2024, it was reported that he would script the upcoming film adaptation of the comic book Avengelyne, with Olivia Wilde directing, and Margot Robbie and Tom Ackerley producing through their LuckyChap Entertainment banner. By April 2025, he was co-writing an upcoming Star Wars film, with Taika Waititi.

McNamara at the 2026 AACTA Festival

== Personal life ==
McNamara has a child by a first marriage, and married Australian actress Belinda Bromilow in 2009. They have two children.

== Filmography ==
Film

Year	Title	Director	Writer	Notes
1995	The Beat Manifesto	No	Yes	Short film
2003	The Rage in Placid Lake	Yes	Yes	
2015	Ashby	Yes	Yes	
2018	The Favourite	No	Yes	Also executive producer
2021	Cruella	No	Yes	
2023	Poor Things	No	Yes	
2025	The Roses	No	Yes	

Television

Year	Title	Notes
1993	All Together Now	1 episode; 'Your Cheatin' Heart'
1997	Big Sky	3 episodes
2001–2005	The Secret Life of Us	12 episodes
2004–2007	Love My Way	7 episodes
2008	Echo Beach	2 episodes
2008	Moving Wallpaper	1 episode
2008	Rush	1 episode
2009–2012	Tangle	7 episodes
2010–2011	Spirited	3 episodes
2011	Offspring	1 episode; 'Complications'
2012–2014	Puberty Blues	7 episodes
2016–2018	Doctor Doctor	Creator, 15 episodes
2020–2023	The Great	Creator, 30 episodes

== Awards and nominations ==
Year	Award	Category	Nominated work	Result
1995	Australian Film Institute	Best Screenplay in a Short Film	The Beat Manifesto	Won
2003	Australian Comedy Awards	Outstanding Comic Screenplay	The Rage in Placid Lake	Nominated
2003	Australian Film Institute	Best Adapted Screenplay	The Rage in Placid Lake	Won
2003	AWGIE Awards	Major AWGIE Award	The Rage in Placid Lake	Won
2003	AWGIE Awards	Best Screenplay Adaptation	The Rage in Placid Lake	Won
2003	Film Critics Circle of Australia Awards	Best Adapted Screenplay	The Rage in Placid Lake	Nominated
2003	Melbourne International Film Festival	Most Popular Feature Film	The Rage in Placid Lake	Won
2007	AWGIE Awards	Best Writing for a Television Series	Love My Way	Won
2007	Australian Film Institute	Best Screenplay in Television	Love My Way	Nominated
2013	AACTA Awards	Best Screenplay in Television	Puberty Blues	Nominated
2014	AWGIE Awards	Best Writing for a Television Series	Puberty Blues	Nominated
2015	AWGIE Awards	Best Screenplay Original	Ashby	Nominated
2018	Academy Award	Best Original Screenplay	The Favourite	Nominated
2018	Atlanta Film Critics Circle	Best Screenplay	The Favourite	Won
2018	BAFTA Award	Best Original Screenplay	The Favourite	Won
2018	British Independent Film Awards	Best Screenplay	The Favourite	Won
2018	Washington D.C. Area Film Critics Association Awards	Best Original Screenplay	The Favourite	Won
2018	Golden Globe Award	Best Screenplay	The Favourite	Nominated
2018	Indiana Film Journalists Association	Best Original Screenplay	The Favourite	Nominated
2018	Los Angeles Online Film Critics Society	Best Original Screenplay	The Favourite	Runner-Up
2018	Detroit Film Critics Society	Best Original Screenplay	The Favourite	Nominated
2018	Gotham Independent Film Awards	Best Screenplay	The Favourite	Nominated
2020	Primetime Emmy Award	Outstanding Writing for a Comedy Series	The Great	Nominated
2023	Florida Film Critics Circle	Best Adapted Screenplay	Poor Things	Won
2023	Capri Hollywood International Film Festival	Best Adapted Screenplay	Poor Things	Won
2023	National Board of Review	Best Adapted Screenplay	Poor Things	Won
2023	AACTA International Awards	Best International Screenplay	Poor Things	Won
2024	BAFTA Award	Best Adapted Screenplay	Poor Things	Nominated
2024	Academy Award	Best Adapted Screenplay	Poor Things	Nominated

== See also ==
- List of Australian Academy Award winners and nominees
