= Mike Hollands =

William Michael Hollands
- Born: 10 March 1946 (age 80); Parramatta, New South Wales, Australia
- Occupation: Film director

William Michael Hollands (born 10 March 1946) is the creative director and founder of Melbourne-based animation house Act3animation. His best known directorial work, the tragicomedy Piñata, was a nominee at the 2005 Annecy International Animated Film Festival in Annecy, France, the 2005 AFI Awards, for Best Short Animation, and won Vancouver's Vidfest 2005.

He was also connected to Deakin University through their motion capture studio, Motion.Lab, with which Act3animation was previously partnered, managing its commercial captures.

Hollands was also an exhibiting painter in his earlier years, and did cover illustrations for various books, including the 1980 Miles Franklin Award winner, The Impersonators, by Jessica Anderson, and 1981's Fly Away Peter, by David Malouf.

As of 2014, Hollands is currently producing a new Act3animation web series entitled Bup & Endo. Created, written and directed by Hollands, episodes are released weekly on the YouTube channel Bup & Endo. The series is described as "an animated series starring two whimsical cartoon characters, Bup and Endo and the other odd characters inhabiting their strange world".

== See also ==
- Act3animation
- Piñata
