= Jeannie Baker =

English-born Australian children's picture book author and artist

- Born: Jeannie Baker; 1950 (age 75–76); Croydon, London, England
- Occupations: Artist, author, film maker
- Writing career
- Period: 1975–present
- Genres: Collage constructions and children's picture books
- Website: www.jeanniebaker.com

Jeannie Baker is an English-born Australian children's picture book author and artist, known for her collage illustrations and her concern for the natural environment. Her books have won many awards.

== Biography ==
Baker was born in London, England on 2 November 1950. She studied graphic design at Croydon School of Art and Brighton Polytechnic, earning honours in art and design, before making her home in Australia in 1975. In the early 1980s, she lived in New York on an Australia Council Visual Arts Board residency. Her book, Home in the Sky (1984), was developed there.

Baker developed the illustrations for her first book, Grandfather, during her final year at Brighton College of Art.

Baker uses a variety of textures in her works. "When I can, I like to use textures from the actual materials portrayed, such as bark, feathers, cracked paint, earth, knitted wool and rusty tin… so that their natural textures become an integral part of the work". Baker's collages illustrate her picture books, but also stand individually as works of art. They are part of many public art collections and have been exhibited in galleries in London, New York and throughout Australia.

Baker is the author-artist of a number of award-winning picture books. Among them is Where The Forest Meets the Sea (about the Daintree Rainforest), a Boston Globe-Horn Honour Book, and the recipient of an International Board of Books for Young People (IBBY) Honour Award and a Friends of the Earth Award in Great Britain. Window was shortlisted for the Kate Greenaway Medal in Great Britain and both Window and Mirror won the Children's Book Council of Australia Picture Book of the Year Award. Baker was the IBBY Australian nominee for the prestigious 2018 Hans Christian Andersen Award for Illustration.

Her work focuses on a diverse range of issues including: family, society, sustainability, the environment, car-free urban spaces, urban sprawl, land degradation, a sense of wonder, nature deficit disorder, introduced pests, Australian outback and wildlife.

Baker was nominated for the Astrid Lindgren Memorial Award in 2021 and again in 2022.

== Works ==
- Polar (1975)
- Grandfather (1977)
- Grandmother (1978)
- Millicent (1980)
- One Hungry Spider (1982)
- Home in the Sky (1984)
- Where the Forest Meets the Sea (1988) (also released in big book format)
- Window (1991) (also released in big book format)
- The Story of Rosy Dock (1995)
- The Hidden Forest (2000) (also released in big book format)
- Belonging (renamed Home in the United States) (2004) (also released in big book format)
- Mirror (2010)
- Circle (2016) (also released in big book format)
- Playing with Collage (2019)
- Desert Jungle (2023)

== Exhibitions ==
- Works are held in permanent collections of The Powerhouse Museum (Sydney), National Library of Australia (Canberra), Queensland Art Gallery (Brisbane), State Library of New South Wales, State Library of Victoria and Art Gallery Western Australia (Perth)
- Circle - A travelling exhibition has been organised by Newcastle Museum in collaboration with Baker, which will follow the migratory path of the Godwits, visiting museums and galleries across Australia and the world

Australian National Maritime Museum (Sydney) - 19 May – 31 July 2016
Newcastle Museum - 6 August – 30 October 2016
Canberra Museum & Gallery - 26 November – 19 February 2016/17
Royal Botanic Gardens of Victoria (Melbourne) - 15 March – 14 May 2017
Botanic Gardens of South Australia (Adelaide) - 5 June – 25 August 2017
Tasmanian Museum and Art Gallery (Hobart) - 7 September – 26 November 2017
Mt Coot-tha Botanic Gardens (Brisbane) - 11 December – 25 February 2017/18
Bundaberg Art Gallery - 7 March – 6 May 2018

- Desert Jungle - Another travelling exhibition organised by the Penrith Regional Gallery.

Penrith Performing and Visual Arts Gallery - 6 May – 9 July 2023
State Library of South Australia (Adelaide) - 15 December 2023 – 18 February 2024
Shoalhaven Regional Art Gallery (Nowra) - 9 March – 4 May 2024
Royal Botanic Gardens (Sydney) - 18 May – 29 June 2024

== Film ==
- Where the Forest Meets the Sea (10-minute, 35mm animated film, produced by Screen Australia, directed by Baker)
- The Story of Rosy Dock (10-minute, 35mm animated film, produced by Screen Australia, directed by Baker)

== Awards and nominations ==
- Circle

Indie Award Best Children's Book 2017
Riverby Award Natural History Writing for Children 2017
Young Australians Best Book Award for Picture Books Shortlisted 2017
Kids Own Australian Literature Award for Picture Books Shortlisted 2017
Wilderness Society Award for Children's Picture Books Shortlisted 2017
Australian Book Industry Book of the Year for Younger Children Shortlisted 2017

- Mirror

Children’s Book Council of Australia Picture Book of the Year Award Joint Winner 2011
Children’s Book Council of Australia Junior Judges Award - Picture Book of the Year Award Honour Book 2011
Indies (Independent Booksellers Association Awards) Children’s Book of the Year Winner 2011
NSW Premier’s Literary Awards, Patricia Wrightson Prize for Children’s Literature Shortlisted 2011
International Youth Library White Ravens Award 2011
Western Australian Premier’s Book Awards Children’s Book Category Shortlist 2011
British Book Design and Production Awards, Primary, Secondary and Tertiary Education Category Winner 2011
CJ Picture Book Awards, CJ Culture Foundation, Korea New Publications Category Finalist 2011
International School Libraries Network Singapore Red Dot Book Awards Shortlisted 2010-11

- Belonging

The Wilderness Society Fiction Award for Children’s Books 2005
ALA Notable Book USA 2005
Children’s Book Council of Australia Picture book of the Year Honour Book 2005

- The Hidden Forest

Australian Wilderness Society Fiction Award for Children’s Books 2001
Govern Award for Children’s Science Picture Books, USA Winner 2003

- The story of Rosy Dock

Children’s Book Council of Australia Picture book of the Year Honour Book Award 1990
The Australian Wilderness Society Fiction Award for Children’s books 1996
The American Library Association Notable Book 1996
Australian Film Industry Award for Best Australian animated Film Finalist 1995
Gold medal for animation Palma international Film Festival 1995

- Window

Children’s Book Council of Australia Picture Book of the Year Award 1992
Young Australian’s Best Book Award Picture Books 1992
Kate Greenaway medal UK Shortlisted 1992
Notable Book in the Field of Social Science USA 1992

- Where the Forest Meets the Sea

Australian Children’s Book Council Picture Book of the Year Honour Book 1988
Young Australian’s Best Book Award Picture Books 1988
Earthworm Book Award Friends of the Earth UK 1988
Boston Globe Horn Book Magazine Honour Book Award 1990
International Board of Books for Young people Honour Book Award 1990
Austrian Children’s Book Council Honour Book award 1996
Australian Film Institute award for Best Australian Animated Film 1988
Greater Union Yoram Gross Award for Best Australian Animated Film 1988

- Home in the Sky

The American Library Association Notable Book 1984
Kate Greenaway Medal UK shortlisted 1985
Children’s book Council of Australia Picture Book of the Year Award Commended 1985
Young Australian’s Best Book Award Shortlisted 1986.
