= Margot Nash =

Documentary filmmaker

- Born: New Zealand
- Citizenship: Australian
- Education: University of New South Wales
- Occupations: Documentarian; Writer; Director; Editor
- Years active: 1970s - present
- Known for: Vacant Possession
- Website: Margot Nash Website

Margot Nash is a New Zealand-born Australian documentary and experimental filmmaker. Her early experimental work focused on feminist film theory and surrealism. Her most famous film is Vacant Possession about family history and strife that reflected her actual childhood. Her films have been nominated for and won multiple Australian Film Institute AACTA awards along with awards from film festivals around the world.

She is also an academic and senior lecturer at the University of Technology Sydney with a focus in filmmaking and feminism. As a part of her academic filmmaking focus she has led a series of workshops with Australian Indigenous filmmakers and Pacific Island women.

== Education ==
Nash attended the University of New South Wales and holds an MFA from the College of Fine Arts.

== Career ==
In the 1970s, Nash began her filmmaker career. She was inspired by filmmakers like Maya Deren, Jean-Luc Godard and the American feminist group W.I.T.C.H.E.S. (Women’s International Terrorist Conspiracy from Hell). Together, with performance partner Robin Laurie, she created the art group AS IF, which stood for Anarcho-Surrealist Insurrectionary Feminists, and wrote a feminist manifesto.

In 1976, with $1300 from the Australian Experimental Film Fund, Nash produced her first film with Laurie the 13 min, 16mm film titled We Aim To Please, as an AS IF production. We Aim To Please was a feminist short film that dissected female sexuality and its representation under the male gaze in the media. It was part of a movement in feminist film at the time and in specific was connected to the Melbourne and Sydney Filmmakers Co-op of the 1970s. We Aim To Please won a Jury Prize at the L’Homme Regarde Homme Film Festival in 1978, the festival was later renamed the Cinéma du Réel. In 2017, We Aim To Please was re-screened at the 2017 Sydney Film Festival, after being digitally restored by the National Film and Sound Archive (NFSA)

In 1982, Nash was the editor of feature length documentary For Love or Money about the history of women's working lives in Australia. The film utilizes a collection of clips including footage from home movies and newsreels to create a cohesive picture of working life. The film was included in the 1986 Sundance Film Festival and the 1991 Cinéma Du Reel festival.

In 1989, she directed an experimental short film Shadow Panic (1989), which was nominated for an Australian Film Institute Award for Best Experimental Film and was shown at the Melbourne International Film Festival.

In 1994, Nash wrote and directed Vacant Possession, which premiered at the Sydney Film Festival in 1995. Nash has said Vacant Possession "re-created some images from [her] childhood" and that she based the father in the film on her own dad. For the film she was nominated for Best Director and Best Original Screenplay at the 1995 Australian Film Institute awards. Additionally, the film received a Special Jury Mention at the Films De Femmes Festival in Créteil in 1996. Vacant Possession was restored and re-screened at the Melbourne International Film Festival in 2023.

From 1996 to 2001 Nash led a series of documentary workshops in the Pacific for Indigenous filmmakers and Pacific island women. She also began lecturing at the University of Technology Sydney in 2000 where she continues to do research as of 2021. In 2005, Nash directed the feature film Call Me Mum, which premiered at the Sydney Film Festival. Call Me Mum won two Australian Film Institute awards, one for Outstanding Television Screen Craft and the other for Best Supporting Television Actress.

In 2012, she began a 14 week program as Filmmaker in Residence at Zürich University of the Arts and began working on a personal documentary which would go on to become The Silences. In 2015, after three years of work, The Silences was released. The film is an autobiographic look into her family's history and her parents' mental illness as it affected her childhood. The film features family photographs, letters, documentary footage and clips from her other films threaded together to create a narrative about her life. The film won an Australian Writers' Guild AWGIE Award for best documentary.

In 2016, the Melbourne Cinémathèque hosted a retrospective of Nash's work, highlighting her feminist work and connection to the 1970s Melbourne theatre scene.

In 2023, her short film Undercurrents: Meditations on Power (2023) had its World Premiere at the Melbourne International Film Festival (MIFF) and its international premiere at the Warsaw Film Festival.

== Filmography ==
=== As Director ===
- We Aim to Please (1976), Short
- Bread and Dripping (1982), Short
- Shadow Panic (1989), Short
- Vacant Possession (1995)
- New Horizons (1996)
- Call Me Mum (2006)
- The Silences (2015)
- Undercurrents: Meditations on Power (2023), Short
