= Kathy Smith (filmmaker) =

- Born: Taree, New South Wales, Australia
- Occupations: New media artist, professor
- Notable work: Slippages Grace (2018); Indefinable Moods (2002); Living on the COMET (1993)
- Website: www.kathymoods.org

Kathy Smith is an Australian independent animator, painter, new media artist and professor with the USC School of Cinematic Arts. Smith chaired the John C. Hench Division of Animation & Digital Arts from 2004 to 2009 and 2010 to 2014. She was part of the founding faculty for the Expanded Animation Research + Practice Program (XA Program) and Directed the inaugural year in 2022 - 2023. XA Program was also part of School of Cinematic Arts USC.

Smith was born in Taree, New South Wales. She graduated from the Sydney College of the Arts in 1985. Shortly after graduation, she was awarded the Sydney Morning Herald Traveling Arts Scholarship for Painting, the Dyason Bequest Study Grant from Art Gallery of NSW, the Dr Denise Hickey Studio Residency at Cite Interantionale des Arts, Paris and the Desiderius Orban Youth Art Award from the Australia Council. This allowed her to work and study in Europe from 1987 - 1988. Her experimental animations have screened "internationally, including SIGGRAPH N-Space Art Gallery, Sundance Film Festival, New York Digital Salon, Hiroshima, Anima Mundi, Ottawa and GLAS International Animation Festivals. She has exhibited internationally at group and solo exhibitions such as Institute of Contemporary Art, London, Conservatorio di Santa Maria degli Angeli, Florence, Italy, and the Australian National Gallery, Canberra." Her body of work includes the award-winning animated film, Indefinable Moods (2001).

== Selected works ==
- 2023: Dimensions- 2D/3D VR Immersive
- 2018: Slippages|Grace - 2D/3D Animation
- 2011: Slippages - Holographic Animation & Painting Installation
- 2009: Grace Hologrpahic Animated Portrait Installation
- 2004-09: 'Hanging Rock' 'Corset' & 'Bushland' 6 mins Panorama Animation loops for above installation
- 2001: Indefinable Moods
- 1993: Living on the Comet
- 1987: Delirium (installation)
- 1985: Change of Place
- 1985: Ayers Rock Animation
- 1984: A Figure in Front of A Painting
- 1983: Designed Nightmare
- 1983: Power & Passion

== Selected film screenings ==
=== Indefinable Moods ===
- Sundance Film Festival Official Selection 2002
- SIGGRAPH 2001
- Computer Graphics International 2001, Hong Kong
- Rhode Island International Film Festival
- Prix Leonardo, Italy
- New York Expo of Short Film & Video, New York
- Anima Mundi International Animation Festival Rio de Janeiro Brazil
- Edinburgh International Film Festival, Scotland
- Micromuseum of Mediaterra Festival, Greece
- 14th Foyle Film Festival, Northern Ireland
- Mediarama 2001 Electronic Art & New Technologies Festival, Spain
- Canberra International Short Film Festival, Australia
- Ajjijic International Film Festival, Mexico
- Ankara International Film Festival, Turkey
- Banff Mountain Film Festival, Canada

=== Living on the Comet ===
- California Institute of the Arts Los Angeles, USA
- Anima Mundi International Animation Festival, Brazil
- 'Animania' International Retrospective of Animation, Italy
- 5th International Animation Festival, Japan
- Cardiff International Film Festival, UK
- New York International Expo of Short Film & Video
- Animated Moments AFI Cinema Sydney, Australia

== Selected awards ==
- 2020 Winner Best Animation Dreamers of Dreams Film Festival London UK Slippages|Grace
- 2019 Winner Best Animation 28th Independent Filmmakers Showcase Los Angeles, CA Slippages|Grace
- 2018 Winner Near Nazareth Festival Israel Slippages|Grace Best Experimental
- 2018 Bronze Remi Award Winner WorldFest Houston Slippages|Grace Best Experimental
- 2017 SCA Mentoring Award Graduate Student Council
- 2013 Mellon Award for Mentoring Graduate Students University of Southern California
- 2011 Impact Award for Education from Adobe Systems Inc.
- 2005 Phi Kappa Phi Faculty Recognition Award in the Creative Arts, USC, for 'Indefinable Moods'
- 2002 Best Animated Short, USA Film Festival, 'Indefinable Moods'
- 2002 Best Animated Film Convergence Art Festival
- 2001 First Place, Computer Graphics International
- 2001 Silver Award, Prix Leonardo Parma Italy, 'Indefinable Moods'
- 2001 Rhode Island International Film Festival, 'Indefinable Moods'
- 2001 Jury Award, New York Expo of Short Film & Video, 'Indefinable Moods'
- 1994 Bronze Award, 'Living on the Comet' at the Expo of Short Film & Video New York
- 1994 Certificate of Merit 'Living on the Comet' Cork International Film Festival
- 1985 Sydney Morning Herald Traveling Arts Scholarship for painting.

== Sources ==
- Wiedemann, Julius (ed.) "Kathy Smith." Animation Now! Los Angeles: Taschen, 2004: 262-9.
