= All Saints season 4 =

All Saints
- Season 4
- Season 4 Cast
- No. of episodes: 43

Release
- Original network: Seven Network
- Original release: 13 February – 27 November 2001

Season chronology
- ← Previous; Season 3 Next → Season 5

The fourth season of the long-running Australian medical drama All Saints began airing on 13 February 2001 and concluded on 27 November 2001 with a total of 43 episodes.

== Plot ==
The year begins with a heatwave tearing through Sydney during bushfire season throwing everything into jeopardy. Ben and his new partner Scott have time to bond when they are trapped in the truck, while Terri decides to take some well deserved leave when Rose warns her to stay away from Mitch. The new NUM, Kate Larsen causes problems as her alcoholism spins out of control. Upon her return, Terri realises things have changed. Former ward clerk Tony is admitted to hospital, suspected of being on drugs. Connor and Jodi's relationship continues to develop until a positive pregnancy test throws a spanner - and people's opinions - into the works. After a ghostly visit from his late wife Stephanie, Ben finally realises it's time to move on with former ambo partner, Bron. Terri developed and unlikely romance with medical registrar, Dr. Malcolm Pussle Von encounters a young leukaemia patient and builds and unlikely friendship. Jared's professional life and his relationship with Kylie becomes rocky when he begins taking speed to help him during exams. Luke's liaison with Claudia, the hospital's CEO comes to a climatic end but all hope for his lovelife is not lost when nurse Paula Morgan is hired as a permanent member of staff on Ward 17. As the year draws to a close, the All Saints staff must say goodbye to one of their beloved nurses. Lives are left hanging in the balance in the explosive season finale that will send shockwaves through the Ward, the hospital and ultimately, their lives.

== Cast ==
=== Main ===
- Georgie Parker as Terri Sullivan (33 episodes)
- Conrad Coleby as Scott Zinenko (42 episodes)
- Jeremy Cumpston as Connor Costello (episodes 1–33)
- Martin Lynes as Luke Forlano (42 episodes)
- Judith McGrath as Von Ryan
- Libby Tanner as Bronwyn Craig
- Ben Tari as Jared Levine
- Erik Thomson as Mitch Stevens
- Brian Vriends as Ben Markham

=== Recurring ===
- Ling-Hsueh Tang as Kylie Preece (26 episodes)
- Joy Smithers as Rose Stevens (21 episodes)
- Belinda Emmett as Jodi Horner (15 episodes)
- Brett Climo as Malcolm Pussle (14 episodes)
- Sonia Todd as Kate Larsen (10 episodes)
- Jane Hampson as Glenys Fell (10 episodes)
- Josh Quong Tart as Matt Horner (8 episodes)
- Alex Jones as Lyle Slater (8 episodes)
- Natasha Beaumont as Rebecca Green (6 episodes)
- Jenni Baird as Paula Morgan (3 episodes)

=== Guest ===
- Rachel Gordon as Claudia MacKenzie (8 episodes)
- Christopher Pitman as Rick Forlano (6 episodes)
- Ivar Kants as Dr. Richard Bird (5 episodes)
- Luciano Martucci as Dominic Turner (4 episodes)
- Valerie Bader as Julie Costello (3 episodes)
- Jake Blundell as Tony Hurst (1 episode)
- Robert Coleby as Prof. Richard Craig (1 episode)
- Kirrily White as Stephanie Markham (1 episode)
- Paul Tassone as Nelson Curtis (1 episode)
- Dawn Fraser as herself (1 episode)
- Simon Pryce as Ambo Brad (1 episode)

== Episodes ==
No. overall	No. in season	Title	Directed by	Written by	Original release date
126	1	"The Heat is On"	Kevin Carlin	Andy Ryan	13 February 2001
A heat wave tears through Sydney and the staff and patients of All Saints are feeling it. Jodi continually bugs maintenance to have their air conditioner fixed. Terri nurses a burns victim who has chosen to not have treatment. Ben and his new ambulance partner Scott Zinenko are stuck in their ambulance after being surrounded by fire. Mitch is forced to take Lucy to work with him when Rose falls asleep. Connor nurses a health fanatic who is dehydrated due to the bushfires. Rose tells Terri to stay away from her and Mitch. A cool change begins to pass through as Terri leaves for a three-month holiday.
127	2	"What Katie Did Next"	Peter Fisk	David Phillips	20 February 2001
The new NUM, Kate Larsen arrives with her no-nonsense persona and has to try and talk a patient out of committing suicide. Bron nurses a bipolar patient who fakes taking his medication and has explosive outbursts. Luke attends a lunch with a group of former prisoners and is forced to perform surgery on a gunshot victim. Connor comforts a soon-to-be groom who comes in drag and is offended when he believes Connor is cracking onto him. Jodi remains the peacekeeper of the ward.
128	3	"Happy Birthday"	Catherine Roden	Charlie Strachan	27 February 2001
Connor nurses two brothers who are arguing over an incident that has put them both in hospital. Sarah Adams is readmitted to the ward, but on her way home, Ben and Scott are forced to deliver her baby in the back of the ambulance. Jared deals with a difficult group of patients and when a patient takes pills that weren't meant for them, Jared resigns but it talked out of it by Kate. Mitch tell Sarah's husband that she's got a few weeks left to live. Bron and Connor throw a surprise party for Jared's birthday.
129	4	"Bend Till You Break"	Scott Hartford Davis	Michaeley O'Brien	6 March 2001
Mitch and Connor are forced to deliver the news of scoliosis to a fourteen-year-old ballerina and her controlling mother. A patient's decision to not have a simple procedure to fix his back aggravates Luke. Connor gives Jodi some flowers which causes a drift between the two of them. Jared becomes the agency nurse for Sarah for her daughter's party. Ben and Scott are required to try to resuscitate a patient with a broken neck when his friends won't leave. Kate delivers Jared an ultimatum.
130	5	"A Matter of Choice"	Rob Stewart	Louise Crane	13 March 2001
Bron's bookie gives her an ultimatum - $13,000 or 5 vials of pethidine. Mitch and Kate allow the court case, in which Sarah sues her old boss and company for compensation, to take place in the ward and she's awarded $1.6m. Kylie and Luke doctor a patient who Bron accuses of being a drug addict. Scott forgets to eat breakfast and has a day of back-to-back call outs. Kate resorts to alcohol. Bron gets helps from Ben. After saying her final goodbyes, Sarah dies. Jodi learns that she is pregnant.
131	6	"Mixed Messages"	Peter Fisk	Anthony Ellis	20 March 2001
Kylie admits a homeless drunk who has a knack for singing. Mitch and Connor try to comfort a suspected rape victim who refuses to let them contact the police, but after she kisses Connor, Von is forced to take over care. After trying terribly hard to organise lunch together, Jodi tells Connor that she's pregnant and that she's having an abortion. Luke is forced to defend a foreign doctor when a mistake leads to Claudia almost firing him. Kate's alcohol addiction continues to worsen.
132	7	"Defiance & Denial"	David Caesar	Bill Garner	27 March 2001
Mitch is rushed off his feet and is forced to miss Lucy's three-month check-up when Jonathan Healey is admitted to the ward. Connor clashes with Dr Sam Mukherjee over his treatment of a patient and then learns Jodi had the abortion and is leaving. Ben and Scott are called out to a man who got hypnotised and won't snap out of it. Kate begins to resort to drinking on the job. Ben gives Bron the $13,000 that she owes Kevin and threatens to kill him if he ever contracts Bron again.
133	8	"Secrets and Lies"	Scott Hartford Davis	David Hannam	3 April 2001
Scott and Ben are called out to a suicide to discover the victim has been dead for weeks. Bron nurses a patient who has bladder issues, but Luke learns that she has ambiguous genitalia. Jared begins to annoy the rest of the Ward staff as he rambles on about nursing legalities. Von and Mitch work on a patient who has a mystery illness and Von soon connects the dots and tells him he has mercury poisoning. Scott reveals he found his father after he committed suicide. Kate's alcoholism worsens.
134	9	"Changing Places"	Rob Stewart	Sally Webb	3 April 2001
Kate's alcoholism begins to affect her work and the influence she has on her staff. Bron deals with a difficult patient who refuses to leave the Ward. Jared worries when his patient returns to Ward 17 paralysed - causing Mitch to play the blame game. Kylie feels terrible about the paralysed patient so much so that when asked to help by Luke, she refuses. Connor warms to a woman and her father, who needs permanent care. Von confronts Kate about her drinking problems and causes a further drift.
135	10	"Too Little Too Late"	Peter Fisk	Margaret Wilson	10 April 2001
The prospect of a nude calendar sends the Ward into overdrive. Ben and Scott are called out to a domestic incident which involved a slit throat. Claudia MacKenzie introduces a new 'no lift, this shift' rule which forces all Ward 17 staff to call an orderly when lifting someone. A fault in an oxygen line causes a simple procedure to end in a patient catching on fire. Mitch and Kate go head-to-head over a patient who needs an expensive operation. Von tries to reach out to Kate with no luck.
136	11	"Night Terrors"	Catherine Roden	Christina Milligan	17 April 2001
Bron, Connor and Jared work a night shift and they encounter some odd events. Bron is asked to participate in a bet about when a patient will die. Von tries to understand why Kate has been drinking and is further shocked when she tries to commit suicide. Connor nurses a patient with a mystery flu-like symptoms that are the mask of something more sinister. Scott and Ben are sent out to a call that involves an old lady who needs sex. Jared's fatigue ends with a saucy romp in the NUM's office with Kylie.
137	12	"Lest We Forget"	Scott Hartford Davis	Charlie Strachan	24 April 2001
Terri returns to the Ward. Tony is brought into the hospital after having an overdose and despite Connor and Kylie's best efforts, he dies. Bron nurses a war veteran who makes her realise just how bad the war was. Mitch and Terri welcome their old colleague who has been employed as the new head of medicine, Dr Malcolm Pussle. Von and Mitch work on a patient with an infected love bite who believes he's a vampire. Connor, Bron and Jared grow closer as they deal with Tony's sudden death.
138	13	"Lost Boys"	Peter Sharp	David Phillips	1 May 2001
Rose returns to the Ward and invites Terri to dinner after a great day. Ben and Scott are called out to a school where a bomb has exploded in a student's locker, injuring three pupils. Bron nurses a special needs patient who will only listen to Mitch. Luke and Connor work on a burns patient, while Von have to get defensive when a patient harasses Rose. Jared nurses a patient who has to help find his patient's lost mouse. Connor and Jared try to convince Bron into letting them get a pet.
139	14	"You Do Me Wrong"	Peter Fisk	Fiona Kelly	8 May 2001
Kylie's fatigue hits a new level when she causes a car crash. Bron's father makes a return to the Ward to work with Mitch on a case of pericarditis. Terri nurses a patient who cannot stop singing Greensleeves. Bron nurses a young woman who admits she was raped by her uncle. Mitch questions why Luke is making Kylie work after her car crash. Bron tells Ben that she was molested by one of her father's friends when she was seven and when she told him, he didn't believe her.
140	15	"All the Sons & Daughters"	Scott Hartford Davis	Anthony Ellis	15 May 2001
Connor's mother, Julie is admitted to the Ward and Mitch is forced to tell her that she has contracted HIV. Bron nurses a young deaf patient Lyle, who is difficult to take care of. Ben and Scott are called out to a strip club, where Scott has organised a stripper to give Ben a lapdance. Bron decides that she is going to talk about her sexual abuse with a professional to get the help she needs. Connor throws blame around for his mother's infection. Von threatens to have Connor kicked off the Ward.
141	16	"To Be or Not to Be"	Catherine Roden	Denise Morgan & Rick Held	22 May 2001
Claudia makes the call to lockdown Ward 17 when Mitch has to help an asylum seeker on a hunger strike. Bron nurses an arrogant patient who had an unfortunate accident whilst walking over hot coals. Ben bonds with a man and helps him seek help after his wife died. Rose sets up Terri on a blind date with Stan Ridgeway in a bid to tear her away from Mitch. Bron and Ben confirm the love for each other and kiss. Connor learns he won't be in the nude calendar. Terri is disappointed to learn Stan has a partner.
142	17	"Growing Pains"	Geoff Cawthorn	Louise Crane	29 May 2001
Stephanie returns as a figment of Ben's imagination after he sleeps with Bron. Malcolm and Mitch got head-to-head over their opinions on a patient's medical treatment. Ben and Scott are called out to a car accident where the deceased victim is a child and the driver is in a catatonic state. Jared and Kylie deal with a patient who is undergoing an elective circumcision. Malcolm asks Terri to have dinner with him and they agree to go on a date at a later time. Bron feels Ben has somehow betrayed her.
143	18	"Bed of Roses"	Catherine Roden	Rick Held	5 June 2001
Ben and Scott bring a homeless patient named Dawn and when her brother arrives on the Ward, the fighting begins. Luke and Claudia reignite their affair and he asks her out on a date. The nude calendar is released and Scott and Jared both get some unexpected and potentially unwanted attention. Terri nurses a patient with MS who has low self-esteem. Luke operates on a patient who ends up dying due to a complication. Ben and Bron make up after he admits that he is finally over Steph.
144	19	"Can You Hear Me?"	Karl Zwicky	Michaeley O'Brien	12 June 2001
Terri and Malcolm go on their date together and it doesn't go exactly to plan. Jared nurses a Catholic man who is forced to undergo a testectomy and refuses to freeze spem specimens despite his wife's burning desire to have a child. Bron and Von nurse a diabetic with angina and are in trouble when he collapses against his ensuite door and he accuses them of negligence. Ben and Scott bring a patient to All Saints who is suffering from a rare illness and believes she has motor neurone disease.
145	20	"Close to Home"	Peter Fisk	Margaret Wilson	17 June 2001
Scott and Ben are stripped and used as pawns in a bid to get better conditions in the prison. Bron nurses a patient who was born with short bowel syndrome and has a huge hatred for her mother. Von bonds with a young child suffering leukaemia. Mitch and Malcolm bond over a game of squash which ends with Malcolm suffering from a hit to the head. A confrontation between Luke and Connor result in the former putting in a complaint to the senior nursing unit manager. Connor admits he wanted to be a doctor.
146	21	"Skeletons in the Closet"	Scott Hartford Davis	John Concannon	26 June 2001
Bron thinks she may be pregnant and after seeking help for Dr. Robert Bird, she decides to go on the pill to prevent any more scares. The parking lot of All Saints gains a carnival ambiance when the staff of the Children's Oncology Ward deck it out to give the children a fun time. Terri and Mitch take care of an old priest whose housekeeper is harbouring a dark secret. Terri discovers a baby in the toilets and learns that it is the son of the housekeeper. Kylie's day in court arrives for her car accident.
147	22	"The Sign"	Peter Fisk	Sarah Walker	3 July 2001
The charity ball for the Children's Oncology Ward is in full swing. Kylie drinks too much and grows jealous of the attention that Jared is getting for his appearance in the nude calendar. Malcolm learns that Rose suffers from bipolar and tells Terri. Scott tries to flirt with Andrea and they then discover a drugged and unconscious Naomi outside the venue. Bron and Connor work the night shift and the staff are all horrified to discover that Naomi was raped. Von spends the night with Zac and comforts him as he passes away.
148	23	"Maiden's Revenge"	David Caesar	Fiona Kelly	10 July 2001
Kylie saves a man from dying on her Meals on Wheels rounds. Rose grows increasingly jealous of Mitch and Terri's relationship after she is forced to bring Lucy into the ED. Bron and Rick get wind of a fixed race and can't help but place a bet. When Bill slips into a coma and it becomes evident that the end is nigh, Kylie and Terri break protocol and sneak his dog onto the Ward to say goodbye for the last time. Bron wins enough money back to pay Ben, but he refuses to accept it.
149	24	"Chains of Love"	Karl Zwicky	David Phillips	10 July 2001
Rose tells Mitch that she is pregnant. Von nurses a patient who is on her period and is suffering from a mysterious illness, but when she is diagnosed with Toxic Shock Syndrome, she tells Von a detail that explains her ailment. Bron tries to save her collapsing relationship after her relapse into gambling. Connor receives a cheque for $10,000 from a former patient. Ben and Scott bring in a patient who seems to have been abused by his wife. Mitch is asked to testify for a patient he gave a joint to. Bron pays Luke his money.
150	25	"Reality Bites"	Grant Brown	Louise Crane	17 July 2001
Mitch feels terrible when he delivers the news of a patient's death to his supposed wife, only to discover he told the wrong person. When the Minister of Health comes to visit the staff at All Saints, Luke is fortunate enough to be doing a kidney transplant, but the procedure is compromised when the journalist accompanying the Minister informs Luke of the donor's true reasoning. Ben and Scott have a rock thrown in them in the ambulance, which leaves Ben in a critical condition.
151	26	"Law of the Jungle"	Scott Hartford Davis	Christina Milligan	24 July 2001
Ben and Scott are forced to transport a hypothermic woman and her deceased child to hospital when she refuses to let go of her. Rick's job at the hospital is put in jeopardy when an ex-con turns up at the hospital having committed a felony. Connor runs into trouble when he nurses a patient who believes he is a wizard. The staff in Ward 17 are discombobulated when the child of the hypothermic woman returns to life. When Terri reveals she isn't ready to become more intimate, she agrees to split with Malcolm.
152	27	"Private Lives"	Peter Fisk	Edwina Searle	31 July 2001
Scott is put under an enormous amount of pressure when Ben falls unconscious at the wheel while transporting a patient. A patient's life is turned upside down when Mitch tells him that he's terminally ill. Von tries to avoid the new cleaner, Rada who happens to be her annoying neighbour, but Rada's dedication puts her life in danger. Bron undermines Luke's confidence, putting Ben's life at further risk and is then assaulted by a patient. Rose tells Mitch that she got her period and he has trouble believing her.
153	28	"Empty Nest"	Scott Feeney	Denise Morgan	7 August 2001
Terri is contacted by a hospital in London asking for a reference for Connor, who applied for a nursing practitioner job without informing anyone and he is forced to make a decision. Bron takes a leave of absence to take care of Ben and they learn a little more about each other. Scott has trouble bonding with his new ambulance partner, Rebecca when she threatens to have him charged with sexual harassment. A suspected case of tuberculosis arrives on the Ward. Mitch is horrified to discover Rose has taken Lucy and left.
154	29	"Poles Apart"	Grant Brown	Sarah Walker	14 August 2001
It's Connor's birthday and the boys decide to take him to a strip club, but his world is turned upside down when the stripper is Jodi. Terri discovers Linda, a former nurse on the Ward, unconscious having become a victim of the serial rapist. Von has an old battle axe on her hands who criticises her nursing. Luke shows off his surgical skills when he performs an operation of a patient who was badly injured in a car accident. Connor informs Jodi that he is leaving the Ward and she should return as the Ward clerk.
155	30	"Delicate Matters"	Scott Hartford Davis	Louise Crane	21 August 2001
Mitch grows frustrated when Rose returns to work but refuses to talk to him or let him see Lucy. Jodi arrives back on the Ward and wonders whether returning was the right decision. Luke is forced to operate on a priest who flatlines on the table and subsequently claims there is no God when he is revived. Kylie is furious with Jared when he falls asleep during sex and the situation becomes more complicated when they work on a man with a broken penis pump. Ben is told he can return to work.
156	31	"Look into My Eyes"	Scott Feeney	Sally Webb	28 August 2001
Jared's increasing exhaustion leads him to making mistakes on the job. Mitch's day starts on a bad note when he witnesses Rose and Lucy and is refused the right to see her, but becomes worse when he receives shocking news. Mitch and Kylie's patient insists on using hypnosis instead of a general anaesthetic for an operation. A patient with cancer looks to euthanasia for a way out. Jared is forced to defibrillate a patient but accidentally shocks Terri and stops her heart. Mitch realises his love for Terri when she is revived.
157	32	"Wild Justice"	Peter Fisk	Fiona Kelly	4 September 2001
Scott and Ben are called out to a violent rampage on a quiet suburban street and Scott puts his life on the line to attempt to save the lives of the gunman's massacre. A patient in Ward 17 has his vital kidney transplant cancelled due to the courier being involved in the massacre. Mitch prepares to appear in court to contest Rose's restraining order application, but when Rose doesn't turn up he begins to worry and it isn't until her mother, Victoria shows up and tells him Rose has disappeared with the baby, that he realises she's unstable.
158	33	"Life as We Know It"	Catherine Roden	David Hannam	11 September 2001
Connor's last day on Ward 17 arrives but it turns sour when he has a serious run-in with Jared over his drug addiction. Jodi reveals her true feelings to Connor. Ma O'Connell arrives on the Ward and after being told she has terminal cancer, Luke makes her an offer that's almost too good to refuse. Bron nurses a patient who is convinced he is part of an alien plan. Terri is upset over Connor's departure and as Mitch comforts her, their feelings for each other surface and they share an intimate kiss. Final appearance of Jeremy Cumpston as Connor Costello
159	34	"Simpatico"	Peter Fisk	David Phillips	18 September 2001
Kylie makes a rash decision about her relationship with Jared when she discovers he has a drug problem. Von begins to realise what is going on between Terri and Mitch. Scott puts his career on the line as a result of his behaviour and his reaction to a drunk patient could spell the end. Jared reaches crisis point when Terri discovers he has been selling confidential hospital data and is forced to decide whether to fire him. Mitch is occupied with a mysterious bond between two patients.
160	35	"Critical Pressure"	Scott Hartford Davis	Louise Crane	25 September 2001
Mitch's desperate search for his wife and daughter learns to a violent attack when he breaks the condition of the AVO rose has out against him. Terri's worry over Mitch and his situation leads her to making a serious mistake that endangers a patient's life and puts Von at the risk of contracing HIV. When he is put on radio duty with Ben are put on radio duty, Scott realises just how badly the events of the past weeks affected him. Jared is put to the test when he is assigned to a patient with OCD.
161	36	"Bitter Medicine"	Scott Feeney	Hamish Wright & Sarah Walker	2 October 2001
Jodi is on the verge of making a life-changing decision when Connor's mother, Julie returns to the Ward and informs her that Connor never stopped caring about her. Rose cheerily returns to Ward having reconciled with Mitch and Terri is happy to support the two of them. Jodi asks Bron to go to the casino with her as part of a potential girls night out and Bron makes the challenging decision to inform Jodi of her gambling addiction. Rose invites Dawn Fraser onto the Ward to help an amputee regain his determination to swim.
162	37	"Heartache"	Catherine Roden	John Concannon	9 October 2001
Mitch and Luke fight to save the life of a bride who was in a car accident and it's only by a sheer miracle does she survive. Terri's well-being is affected when she and Mitch realises how far apart they now are. Lyle Slater returns to the Ward and is caught between Bron and Rose's advocacy for physiotherapy and a surgeon's desire to operate. Jodi decides to follow her heart to London and brings her brother Matt is to assume her ward clerk position. Invitations go out for Mitch and Rose's anniversary party, but Terri doesn't receive one.
163	38	"Where There's Smoke"	Julian Pringle	Rick Held	16 October 2001
Von and Bron both have to deal with smokers when a young lady who started a fire with her cigarette, and an older lady with terminal emphysema are admitted. Barbara Woods, a young girl with Down Syndrome returns to the Ward for a hysterectomy, but Luke refuses to operate when he finds out the truth about why she's having one. Lyle begins work at the hospital and has trouble finding his feet. Terri is the common denominator in a love triangle between Mitch, Dom and Malcolm, but chooses to sleep with Malcolm.
164	39	"Child's Play"	Peter Fisk	Denise Morgan	23 October 2001
Rose leaves baby Lucy home alone on a stormy night and is later picked up by paramedics on a swing in a park. Mitch becomes extremely worried and soughts marriage counselling to fix the cracks. Bron is stalked by the serial rapist and is later trapped in the hospital boiler room, scared and having to fight for her life. Ben is shaken when he discovers the tragic results of what gambling can do to a mother and her child. Luke and Terri are forced to confront horrific topics after the admission of a patient who was raped anally.
165	40	"Behind Closed Doors"	Scott Patterson	Sarah Walker	30 October 2001
Von and Mitch are asked by a cross-dressing patient to help him die in his outfit but to make sure his wife does not discover his habit. Bron nurses a patient who has to have part of her thyroid gland removed and requested to have it given to her in a jar. Terri begins to wonder what Malcolm is up to when he leaves the room to answer phone calls. Ben and Scott argue over Bron's attack. Kylie confronts the oncology registrar about his misogynistic attitude towards her, leading to him having a heart attack.
166	41	"A Little Death"	Catherine Roden	Christina Milligan & David Boutland	6 November 2001
Bron is in danger when she visits Dr Bird for a prescription but learns that he is the serial rapist and is taken hostage. Joan allocates Ward 17 to be the designated ward to treat the outbreak of Golden Staph around the hospital. Luke visits nurse Paula to be tested for the infection and asks her out on a date, but cancels it when he learns she has a son. Lyle is the hero when he gets Ben and Scott to save Bron after she is kidnapped. Matt introduces a new system that causes chaos on the Ward.
167	42	"The Other Side of Perfection"	Julian Pringle	David Hannam	13 November 2001
Rebecca and Scott are called out to a bombing site where an accident leads to Rebecca being seriously injured and Scott realising he has feelings for her. Ben plans to propose to Bron on a picnic he organised, but things do not turn out as expected. Mitch informs a patient's husband that he must choose between his wife and his unborn child. Luke is moved by a new and innovative way to treat a Parkinson's patient. Terri learns the truth about Malcolm's secret, leading them to make a life-changing decision.
168	43	"Falling Down"	Rob Stewart	Christina Milligan	27 November 2001
Nelson Curtis, a nurse practitioner and Paula Morgan, a registered nurse are employed in two new permanent positions on the ward. Malcolm questions Von's competence as a nurse and whether or not she should be taking care of a patient with complications from a caesarean. On his way home, Mitch is witness to a terrible car crash. A delusional Rose contacts the Ward when Mitch fails to arrive home and alarms Terri, who must choose whether she wants to take the job at Stanford University. Terri finds Rose, unconscious with her life hanging in the balance.

== Weakest Link Special Episode ==
On 26 November 2001, a special episode of The Weakest Link featuring nine actors from the show went to air. The results were as follows:

	Main Rounds								Final Round
Round:	1	2	3	4	5	6	7	8	Final
Voted Out:	Conrad; 6/9 Votes	Josh^{1} 3/8 Votes	Georgie^{2} 4/7 Votes	Judith; 3/6 Votes	Joy; 3/5 Votes	Marty; 3/4 Votes	Ben^{3} 1/3 Votes	–	Erik (Winner); Ling (Runner-up)
Money Banked:	$3,000	$10,000	$1,200	$3,000	$7,200	$3,000	$200	$5,200 x 3	$43,200; TOTAL
Contestant	Votes								
Erik	Conrad	Josh	Georgie	Joy	Joy	Marty	Ben	Won	
Ling	Conrad	Ben	Ben	Judith	Ben	Marty	Erik	Lost	
Ben	Ling	Ling	Georgie	Joy	Joy	Marty	Ling		
Marty	Conrad	Ling	Judith	Judith	Joy	Erik			
Joy	Conrad	Josh	~~Judith~~; Georgie^{2}	Judith	Ling				
Judith	Conrad	Ling	Georgie	Marty					
Georgie	Conrad	Josh	Judith						
Josh	Georgie	Georgie							
Conrad	Georgie								

- Note that the following are regarding the contestant, not the contestant the contestant votes against:

Red indicates the contestant was the weakest link
Lime indicates the contestant was the strongest link

^{1} Josh and Ling tied with three votes each, but as Erik was the strongest link, he opted to vote Josh off.

^{2} Georgie and Judith tied with three votes each, but as Joy was the strongest link, she opted to vote Georgie off, though she originally voted for Judith.

^{3} Each player received one vote, but as Erik was the strongest link, he opted to vote Ben off.

Conrad was first eliminated for annoying everyone. Josh was next on a countback also for annoying everyone. Georgie followed for getting too many votes in previous rounds. Judith was voted out for not answering enough questions correctly. Joy was eliminated for not banking any money nor answering enough questions correctly. Marty was next also for not answering enough questions correctly. Ben was voted out on a countback for not banking anything nor answering enough questions correctly. In the end, Erik defeated Ling in the head-to-head round.

The final total won was $43,200, which Erik donated to Care Australia.

== DVD release ==
The Complete Fourth Season
Set Details	Special Features
42 Episodes (1921 Mins.); Episodes 127–168; 10-Disc Set; 16:9 Widescreen Aspect Ratio; English (Dolby Digital 2.0 Stereo); Distributed by EMI; Rated M; All Region Compatible	Slipcase Packaging
Release Dates	Slipcase Packaging
Australia	Slipcase Packaging
27 November 2006	Slipcase Packaging
