= All Saints season 3 =

All Saints
- Season 3
- No. of episodes: 41

Release
- Original network: Seven Network
- Original release: 8 February – 21 November 2000

Season chronology
- ← Previous; Season 2 Next → Season 4

The third season of the long-running Australian medical drama All Saints began airing on Seven Network on 8 February 2000 and concluded on 21 November 2000 with a total of 41 episodes.

== Plot ==
Continuing on from Season 2, we continue to follow the twists and turns in the lives of these hospital workers.

== Cast ==
=== Main ===
- Georgie Parker as Terri Sullivan (Note: Georgie Parker appeared in 37 of the 41 episodes in the season)
- Jeremy Cumpston as Connor Costello (40 episodes)
- Martin Lynes as Luke Forlano
- Judith McGrath as Von Ryan
- Libby Tanner as Bronwyn Craig
- Ben Tari as Jared Levine
- Erik Thomson as Mitch Stevens (40 episodes)
- Brian Vriends as Ben Markham (37 episodes)
- Kirrily White as Stephanie Markham (episodes 1–23)

=== Recurring ===
- Ling-Hsueh Tang as Kylie Preece (24 episodes)
- Joy Smithers as Rose Stevens (19 episodes)
- Celia Ireland as Regina Butcher (14 episodes)
- Jake Blundell as Tony Hurst (10 episodes)
- Belinda Emmett as Jodi Horner (8 episodes)
- Pia Miranda as Brittany Finlay (6 episodes)

=== Guest ===
- Rachel Gordon as Claudia MacKenzie (5 episodes)
- Marta Dusseldorp as Insp. Debbie Bloom (4 episodes)
- Melissa Jaffer as Eileen Sullivan (4 episodes)
- James Roden as Dr. Stan Ridgeway (4 episodes)
- Anthony Lawrence as Fergus Tiegan (3 episodes)
- Martin Vaughan as Ryan Sullivan (2 episodes)
- Eric Bana as Rob Biletsky (2 episodes)
- Caitlin McDougall as Jodie Reeves (2 episodes)
- Josephine Byrnes as Marion Lord (2 episodes)
- Bille Brown as Steve Coulter (2 episodes)
- Sarah Aubrey as Amanda Morton (2 episodes)
- Zoe Carides as Sarah Adams (2 episodes)
- Peter Lamb as Neil Phillips (1 episode)
- Christopher Pitman as Rick Forlano (1 episode)
- Julie Hamilton as Maureen Forlano (1 episode)
- Carmen Duncan as Elizabeth Wallace (1 episode)
- Alex Hamill as Christopher Wallace (1 episode)
- Julie Stevenson as Victoria Carlton (1 episode)
- Bob Brooks as Mark Carlton (1 episode)

== Episodes ==
No. overall	No. in season	Title	Directed by	Written by	Original release date
85	1	"Valley of the Shadow – Part 1"	Mark Piper	David Phillips	8 February 2000
Steph begins spotting and fears the worst. Rob Biletsky returns to the hospital with his heart set on revenge. The hospital goes into lockdown after there's an explosion in the medical centre with Rose, Von and Mitch inside. The ward is rushed off their feet by all the casualties. After everyone discovers the first explosion was due to bomb, Terri, Von, Ben, and Bron are trapped by another explosion. Terri frantically tries to save Alex who came into the ward the year previous for a bone marrow transplant. Connor attacks a man after he tells someone their wife survived. After Rob is saved by Ben, Von discovers he is behind the bomb explosion and he is admitted to Ward 17.
86	2	"Valley of the Shadow – Part 2"	Mark Piper	Margaret Wilson	8 February 2000
Rob Biletsky sets a bomb to go off at 5pm. Terri and Luke safely get Alex out of the elevator and into surgery in time to save her. Mitch tells Rose that he loves her and when he decides that life is short, he proposes. Von tries desperately to get out of the medical centre and after some screaming, she is saved by Ben and Bron. While performing surgery on Rob and learning he is the bomber, Luke seriously considers letting him die on the table. With two minutes left on the bomb, Terri discovers it and Mitch and herself get it out of the building just in time. Mitch and Rose announce to everyone on the ward that they are getting married.
87	3	"Bending and Breaking"	Kevin Carlin	Anthony Ellis	15 February 2000
Bron nurses Dr Madsen's wife and brother and discovers that they are having an affair. Connor nurses an Irish patient who has been living in Australia for six years on an expired visa and Regina gives him an offer too good to refuse. The annual hospital charity season has begun. Steph and Terri are determined to win the bed race, but when Terri gets caught up, Jared has to take her place and they win the race – with the help of some creativity. Regina announces to the ward that she and Fergus are getting married.
88	4	"Eye of the Beholder"	Peter Fisk	John Banas	22 February 2000
Terri and Jared nurse a former television star with severe burns to her face and agoraphobia. Bron and Luke work around each other as friends, while Luke gets asked out by a patient. Steph begins cramping and is devastated to discover she has lost her baby. Ben blames Terri and the powers that be at the hospital for Steph's miscarriage. Regina goes overboard in planning her wedding to Fergus. After meeting up with the patient, Luke discovers that she is one half of a lesbian couple, wanting his sperm to have a child.
89	5	"First, Do No Harm"	Nicky Marshall	Ro Hume	22 February 2000
Ben and Mick are called out to a teen bashing and after it is discovered the teen is a heroin addict, Mick is bashed by the dealers. Bron feels terrible when she discovers about the bashing because he took over her shift. Mitch is asked for the pill by a teen – who later discovers she may have ovarian cancer. Von and Luke are frazzled when the CEO's mother is readmitted and they don't know what is going on with her. Terri has trouble organising a dress for the ball but later receives one from a mystery person.
90	6	"After the Ball"	Mark Piper	Charlie Strachan	7 March 2000
The staff of Ward 17 get ready for the All Saints Medical Centre Ball. Connor is annoyed when his suit is covered in ruffles. Kylie is put under pressure by Mitch and she begins to get very stressed. Von and Kylie nurse a patient with an infected surgical wound. Bron becomes increasingly annoyed with Luke's schmoozing. Neil turns up at Terri's place, determined to take her to the ball and when he tries to rape her, she stabs him once. Neil turns up in Emergency with two stab wounds and after being rushed to surgery, he dies.
91	7	"Command and Control"	Geoff Cawthorn	Chris Hawkshaw	14 March 2000
Terri returns to work but is haunted by thoughts of Neil. Steph nurses Mick and must help him through his first hydrotherapy session with Rose. Jared becomes increasingly annoyed by his patient's tea addiction. Bron and Mitch work on a patient who believes there is something significantly wrong with him because of the internet. Mick worries his sex life will never be the same, but his worries are later quashed. Regina, Connor and Jared are on a mission to discover who was murdered – and learn Terri was behind the killing.
92	8	"A Fraction Too Much Friction"	Peter Fisk	Denise Morgan	21 March 2000
Luke's in for a rough time when his brother, Rick is admitted to Ward 17 after swallowing razor blades and he learns Rick was abused in jail. Connor cannot stop going on about his date with a cheerleader. Ben works with a distressed ambulance officer who gets very anxious. Bron and Luke's mother, Maureen bond over Rick and Luke. A case of food poisoning sweeps through the ward. Jared strings Connor along, making him believe he also has food poisoning. Terri learns that the trial is going ahead – she will be tried for Neil Phillips' murder.
93	9	"A Fine Balance"	Catherine Roden	Serge Lazareff	28 March 2000
Bron and Ben are called out to an accident that has resulted in a decapitation and Bron is forced to find the victim's head. Mitch is accused of molestation after he tries to get a teen gymnast to tell her coach she's in hospital. Von works on a past patient who is now blind, terminal and only has hours to live. Jared learns there's a thief on the ward after his wallet is stolen. Rose becomes increasingly jealous and begins to believe she will always be second best to Terri. Connor gets on Von's bad side.
94	10	"In the Blood"	Mark Piper	Peter Kinloch	4 April 2000
Jared nurses a patient who seems to have been attractive and clingy daughters. Steph nurses a children's nurse who, after her bowel is nicked during a colonoscopy, lodges a complaint against Luke, who is run off his feet. Ben and Bron are called out to a suspected OD, but they are in for trouble when a pursuit ensues and Ben is knocked unconscious and left for dead in a pool. Mitch and Connor nurse a difficult patient who is incredibly rude to Terri. Bron is up for a commendation from the superintendent due to her saving Ben.
95	11	"Hearts and Minds"	Chris Martin-Jones	Anthony Ellis	11 April 2000
Kylie works on a young man who believes he is possessed by the heart he got from a donor. Luke's meeting with the hospital board arrives and Steph is forced to testify against him. Von has trouble working with Connor and created a roster for them to work by. Terri wants a patient's husband to be admitted as she believes he is working too strenuously. Bron tries desperately to get Ben to help Luke. Kylie begins to believe that Mitch has a problem with her. Luke is cleared. Terri learns that a date has been set for the trial.
96	12	"Food for Thought"	Mark Piper	Margaret Wilson	18 April 2000
Mitch and Steph work on a lady with a supposed case of anorexia who is incredibly close with a television reporter. Ben and Bron are called out to find a young boy with his head caught. When a patient is admitted to Ward 17 with a suspected case of tuberculosis, Kylie and Von go head-to-head. Terri worries her parents will find out about her murder charge when a TV crew is brought into Ward 17. Luke and Steph work on a young patient who discovers he has melanoma – and is later offered a role in a documentary.
97	13	"Blessed Release"	Peter Fisk	David Phillips	25 April 2000
Terri's father, Ryan is admitted to Ward 17 and asks Terri to euthanise him. Jared is shocked to discover he went to school with the police officer, working as prosecution on Terri's case. Von tries to get Luke to work on a security guard on the cusp of redundancy. Ryan signs an NFR order, but when he goes into cardiac arrest, the staff break protocol on Terri's wishes and resuscitate him. Terri is appalled when her mother tells her she should have let Neil rape her. Rose is on a wild goose chase when she loses her engagement ring.
98	14	"Rush to Judgement"	Catherine Roden	Andy Ryan & Ro Hume	2 May 2000
Bron and Ben are called out to a woman who is scarily euphoric with a child. Mitch and Kylie are thrown when a patient with a persistent cough, dies. A former patient of Mitch's is convinced she is dying and he vows to find out what's wrong at the Rehabilitation Centre. Bron eats some brownies the patient gives her that gives her a high. Jared has trouble working on a patient who refuses to listen to him or Kylie until she threatens him with amputation. Terri learns that her murder trial starts sooner than she expected
99	15	Judge Not...	Chris Martin-Jones	Charlie Strachan	9 May 2000
The trial begins. The staff in Ward 17 are rushed off their feet and complain about their low supplies. Connor nurses an unsteady patient who accuses him of theft. Kylie, Mitch and Connor solve the medical mystery around the unsteady patient. Bron plots to steal equipment from Ward 12 and with the help of Connor, succeeds. Luke and Von are called to the witness stands at Terri's trial and both are tried to make Terri look bad by the prosecution. Jared breaks off his relationship with CI Debbie Bloom.
100	16	...Lest Ye Be Judged	Peter Fisk	Charlie Strachan	16 May 2000
Terri's court case continues as the defence try to save her from jail time. The staff in Ward 17 continue to fight over medical equipment and the feuding worsens after their defibrillator is taken to be mended. Kylie and Jared work on a young woman who has pain during sex – and they later have to figure out how to tell the patient that she is allergic to her husband's seminal fluid. Mitch admits that he's still in love with Terri. After much consideration, the jury delivers a verdict of not guilty.
101	17	"Duty of Care"	Catherine Roden	Louise Crane	23 May 2000
Von is surprised when Hilary Doyle is readmitted to the ward, knowing she will soon die. Jared nurses a mother whose cancer has returned. Steph organises for the Ward 17 staff to walk off the job and go on strike in retaliation to the news that the ward will be closed. Terri admits that she misses Mitch, but he tells her he loves Rose. Regina and Fergus learn that the immigration department are sending him back to Ireland, but despite this, they decide that they love each other and get married.
102	18	"Beyond All Praise"	Scott Feeney	Fiona Kelly	30 May 2000
Joan Marden announces that Terri has been nominated for Employee of the Year. Von has trouble nursing a patient who has cancer. Steph nurses an anaemic women who has been bleeding for four weeks since giving birth to her child. Jared, Connor and Bron begin house-hunting. Jared and Luke work on a patient who won't speak because he's lost his false teeth. Terri wins the Employee of the Year award and makes an inspiring speech, which in turn saves Ward 17 from closure.
103	19	"Out of Nowhere"	Di Drew	Serge Lazareff	6 June 2000
Ben and Bron are called out to a hotel where an escort has left her buyer, dead. Luke has trouble working with Tom Snowdon, believing he's still a user. Mitch, Terri and Kylie work on an illegal immigrant who keeps having seizures for unknown reasons. Steph works on a paraplegic who tells his pregnant girlfriend to have an abortion. Connor discovers Linda, the nurse he had a crush on, shooting up in the bathroom. After Linda admits Tom was behind her use, he kills himself. Luke refuses to let Tom's death affect him.
104	20	"Frozen in Time"	Peter Fisk	Denise Morgan	13 June 2000
Tony returns from New York and assumes Regina's position as ward clerk. Bron and Ben get called out to an older man who jumps out of trees for a living. Steph unknowingly nurses the woman that Ben has a one-night stand with. Terri swaps with Steph to do general nursing for the day. Kylie and Mitch work on a patient with multiple sclerosis. Kylie gets on Jared's bad side by being rude to Huntington's sufferers, but they end up going on a date. Terri announces that she is going on a retreat and Steph is the acting NUM.
105	21	"Girl of the Moment"	Catherine Roden	Chris Hawkshaw	20 June 2000
After an accident involving a car bonnet, Bron and Luke work on a patient with a physical disorder. Steph runs the ward efficiently in her eyes – but strictly in the eyes of others. Connor has trouble nursing a difficult patient who dislikes him. Mitch is the doctor for Jared's patient who seems to tell him how to plan his wedding. Rose begs Mitch to write his vows as their wedding approaches. Luke is fobbed off by Dr Madsen. Bron comforts a woman who discovers the sister she hates is her mother.
106	22	"Dead on Time"	Scott Feeney	Anthony Ellis	27 June 2000
Tony, Connor and Jared disagree over a blind patient's decision to have a circumcision. Mitch and Jared work on a patient who discovers that her blood type is different to her child's. Connor and Jared use a guide dog as a chick magnet. Jared finally cleans the equipment room. Connor is thrilled to be the 2IC for the day until shocking news rocks Ward 17. Ben and Bron are called out to a head-on collision which Steph was involved in. Luke is forced to operate and during surgery, she dies. Final appearance of Kirrily White as Stephanie Markham
107	23	"Blood, Sweat and Tears"	Di Drew	Margaret Wilson	4 July 2000
The staff of Ward 17 attend Steph's funeral. Steph's brother Chris turns up and a showdown between him and Ben ensues. Von grows frustrated whilst working on two women, reconnected by their high school reunion who are at each other's throats. Kylie and Mitch work on a teen with a rare disorder who broke his arm, skateboarding. Connor and Luke work on a young Down's woman who is petrified of hospitals. Steph's mother comes to the ward and the Ward 17 staff learn where Steph learnt her personality from.
108	24	"Twentieth Century Blues"	Scott Hartford Davis	David Phillips	11 July 2000
Connor is the nursing unit manager of Ward 17 and has trouble dealing with his staff's problems. Mitch works on a woman with agoraphobic who seems to be allergic to everything. Luke has concerns about Amanda, an agency nurse who disliked Steph. Bron and Ben are called out to a car accident which is very similar to Steph's. Rose tells Mitch that she doesn't think she can be with him if he continues with medicine, however they soon forgive each other. Terri bonds with another nun and begins to question her faith.
109	25	"Into the Unknown"	Catherine Roden	Charlie Strachan	25 July 2000
Connor, Luke and Jared attend Mitch's bucks night. Terri learns that her friend from the retreat has left the order. Bron, who's in charge of Ward 17 for the night, goes head-to-head with a young, arrogant doctor who treats nurses as they're below him. Amanda nurses Sister Frances who wants her to call a nun who has been dead for twenty years. A drunk Luke takes his anger over Steph's death out on Mitch and punches a wall. Terri makes a tough decision and informs Von – she's leaving the order.
110	26	"Promise of Things to Come"	Kevin Carlin	Louise Crane	25 July 2000
Rose and Mitch's wedding day arrives and the ward staff are worried when Mitch stays to work on a patient with a rare bone disorder. Von nurses a patient who has an obsession for plastic surgery. Mitch goes against Connor's wishes and gets marijuana for his patient's nausea. Jared nurses a psychiatrist at the hospital who is paralysed on one side of his body. Having left the order, Terri watches Mitch and Rose's wedding, but leaves just before they are pronounced husband and wife.
111	27	"What Becomes of the Broken Hearted?"	Di Drew	Annette Moore & Sarah Smith	1 August 2000
Jared offers to look after the new student nurse but becomes frustrated when he discovers she's obnoxious. Kylie is shocked to discover the Ward 17 staff have planned a celebration for her birthday. Von nurses two patients – Kath, who wants to be independent, and Leanne, who lost both of her children in the car accident the caused her admission. Jared has money issues when his credit card is declined. Having attended Leanne's car crash, Ben finally is able to release his anger over Steph's death.
112	28	"The Cost of Living"	Scott Hartford Davis	Andy Ryan	8 August 2000
Mitch returns from his honeymoon and is still oblivious to the fact that Terri has left the Order. The Ward 17 staff continue to have trouble with the new nursing computer program. Luke and Jared work on a patient who treats monetary investiture more importantly than his health. Mitch brings back a woman from the airport who is diagnosed with septicaemia. Connor and Tony learn that Jared's father committed corporate fraud. Terri tells Mitch – and he tells Rose – of her decision to leave the Order.
113	29	"One for the Road"	Mark Piper	Serge Lazareff & Margaret Wilson	15 August 2000
Brittany bonds romantically with a patient and gets caught kissing him by Jared. Terri and Von nurse a Greek woman with a young child and no ability to speak English who later goes AWOL, leaving the child to Von. Claudia threatens Terri with job cuts. Ben and Bron are called out by an elderly lady to help rescue her cat. Terri decides to give her new Nursecare program a thorough analysis. An illicit liaison with Claudia makes Luke arrive to a decision and ends his relationship with Bron.
114	30	"Another Place, Another Time"	Kevin Carlin	Louise Crane	22 August 2000
Will Harrington, a former patient of Von's returns to the ward and reveals all about her nursing days in London where all her patients loved her. Rose, Mitch and Terri work on a patient who they later discover has a large, almost inoperable brain tumour. Luke discovers Bron never stopped gambling and he demands that she pay him back the $10,000 he loaned her. Connor decides he does not want to be a nursing unit manager and returns to Ward 17. Terri becomes startled by Rose's weirdly fast change of attitude.
115	31	"Bosom of the Family"	Di Drew	Chris Hawkshaw	29 August 2000
Jared nurses a woman who the Ward 17 staff suspect as being a victim of domestic violence but after an altercation with Brittany, they realise the son of the woman is at fault. Ben and Bron are called out to a car accident where a woman is trapped and after getting her released, Ben is forced to perform as fasciotomy with the help of Luke. Terri, Mitch, Connor and Kylie are confused when a patient dies due to NurseCare. Von and Connor nurse an annoying patient with diabetes.
116	32	"Duty Bound"	Scott Hartford Davis	Denise Morgan	5 September 2000
Connor nurses a man with motor neurone disease. Bron and Ben are called to an industrial freezer where two women have fused together in the freezing temperatures. Kylie begins her surgical rotation and has plenty of questions for her first case. Mitch and Rose discover that she is pregnant and are both shocked to learn she is more than five months gone. Brittany – after earlier hesitation – takes a cardiac arrest into her stride and saves a man from death. Terri is jealous after discovering the pregnancy.
117	33	"Tender Loving Care"	Mark Piper	David Phillips	12 September 2000
Mitch learns that Rose has bipolar disorder and she has gone off the medication. Rose tries to convince Claudia that Terri is incompetent after learning she is nursing a patient on the run from the police. Bron nurses a disabled man who gives her tickets to the Olympics. Tony learns that his boyfriend in New York, Alistair has paid for him to come visit. The Ward staff learn about Luke and Claudia, before discovering they are all infected with scabies. Rose becomes jealous of how much time Terri and Mitch spend together.
118	34	"Ghosts"	Scott Feeney	Charlie Strachan	3 October 2000
Jodi Horner arrives as the new ward clerk. Jared's grandmother turns up and accuses one of Jared's patients of being a Nazi doctor. Mitch and Terri sneak a patient onto the ward and break protocol to find out what's wrong with him. Bron and Ben's feelings for each other begin to grow into something more than a friendship. Luke and Connor treat a man who wants to join a freakshow as a swallower. Rose grows agitated by the amount of time Terri and Mitch are together.
119	35	"More Than Life"	Geoffrey Nottage	Michaeley O'Brien	10 October 2000
Luke is worried when Madsen tells him that he is to perform risky brain surgery on a patient, Evan who believes in cryonics. Terri has to talk to Jodi about her attire causing Jodi to believe she's a lesbian. Bron has to pretend to be Ben's girlfriend when he is tricked into a date. Jared nurses a young man who is having trouble studying from the HSC and ends up getting help from Jodi. Terri and Claudia clash over Evan. Bron puts a $2000 bet on a horse, against Ben's better judgement, and lost.
120	36	"The Best Laid Plans"	Mark Piper	Christina Milligan	17 October 2000
Mitch is forced to tell Sarah Adams, his pregnant patient, that she has cancer and only has a maximum of twelve months. Eileen begs for Terri's help in caring for Ryan. Jared and Luke take care of a patient who has mysterious symptoms and uncontrollable bleeding. The sexual tension between Ben and Bron continues to grow. Rose's tries to offer the staff of ward 17 massages as part of a no-stress week. Terri takes some time off, effective immediately, offering Connor another stint at being a NUM.
121	37	"Lottery of Life"	Scott Feeney	Andy Ryan & Serge Lazareff	24 October 2000
Ben and his partner are called out to a lottery winner's house after he threatens to commit suicide. Jared nurses a patient who is suspected to be taking steroids and Jodi thinks is gay. Bron and Luke clash over a patient who Luke believes is an addict. Von believes she's been asked out on a date by a patient of hers who happens to be a lesbian. Bron is devastated when her credit card is declined and learns she could've won $20,000. Connor's crush on Bron continues to be evident.
122	38	"Fate Dances with Lady Luck"	Geoff Bennett	Chris Hawkshaw	31 October 2000
Von nurses a young boy who has a suspected case of leukaemia but must donate bone marrow for his cancer-ridden sister. Ewan, a jixing painter, arrives on the ward to paint the walls. Jared tries his hardest to get a urine sample from his elderly patient. When Bron and Ben call out the Medical Response Team, they get Luke and insults are thrown back and forward. Mitch treats a patient who cheated on her husband and contracted herpes. After learning Jared believes they're a couple, Connor admits his love for Bron and she turns him down.
123	39	"Me, Myself and I"	Kevin Carlin	Daniel Krige	7 November 2000
It's the Melbourne Cup Day and the staff rush to finish work before the race. Mitch and Jared work on a man who has multiple personality disorder. Ben and Bron are called out to an industrial site where a man has caught his hair in a piece of equipment. Connor takes tips from a patient on how to pick up girls. Ryan grows more sick and continues to argue with Terri about Mitch. Rose's jealousy continues to grow. Connor and Jodi share a moment of passion share a kiss and later make it to the bedroom.
124	40	"Heart and Soul"	Mark Piper	Denise Morgan	14 November 2000
Connor nurses a patient with a rather large piece of metal caught in his penis due to a piercing mishap. Bron is trapped in a hole, under a beam after an accident and when the hole begins to fill with water, Ben admits he lovers her. Luke blames Kylie for a patient neglecting the fact that he has hepatitis C. Connor tries to get Jodi to lay off the flirtation in the ward. Mitch is stuck between a rock and a hard place when Sarah Adams is readmitted to the ward and her husband and her have opposing views on pain medication.
125	41	"Stolen Moments"	Di Drew	Louise Crane	21 November 2000
After her father's death, Terri returns to work. Mitch and Jared work on a patient with a rare form of dementia. Rose goes into labour and delivers a baby girl, before being rushed to theatre with a haemorrhage. Kylie pays of Jared's credit card debt for Hanukkah. Jodi vows to win the best decorated Christmas ward. A patient's case opens Terri's eyes and she reveals that she broke up with Mitch because she thought he was violent. Bron decides to leave the ambulance service and start back in the Ward. Terri admits she's made a terrible mistake and breaks down, knowing she's missed her chance with Mitch.

== DVD release ==
The Complete Third Season
Set Details	Special Features
42 Episodes (1825 Mins.); Episodes 85–126; 10-Disc Set; 1:33:1 Fullscreen Aspect Ratio; English (Dolby Digital 2.0 Stereo); Distributed by EMI; Rated M; All Region Compatible	Slipcase Packaging
Release Dates	Slipcase Packaging
Australia	Slipcase Packaging
17 July 2006	Slipcase Packaging
