= All Saints season 11 =

All Saints
- Season 11
- 2008 Season DVD
- No. of episodes: 40

Release
- Original network: Seven Network
- Original release: 12 February – 25 November 2008

Season chronology
- ← Previous; Season 10 Next → Season 12

The eleventh season of the long-running Australian medical drama All Saints began airing on 12 February 2008 and concluded on 25 November 2008 with a total of 40 episodes.

== Plot ==
At the start of the 11th season, most of the team members find themselves held hostage at gunpoint in the hospital’s emergency department; simultaneously, an explosion occurs in the pathology lab, while a series of drug thefts unfolds. It is a moment of extreme trial for the ‘All Saints’ team—a situation where, despite their own safety being at risk, they must fulfill their duty to save the lives of their patients.This confined situation stirs up a memory in Von Ryan that he had kept buried for decades, forcing him to finally confront it. Amidst these trying circumstances, when Bart West falls in love with a woman—in whom he himself had diagnosed cancer, and who subsequently passes away—Von offers him his full support and comfort.Mike Vlasek donates a kidney to his son; he is forced to endure intense suffering as he is unable to take morphine to manage the severe post-operative pain. A complex and volatile love triangle develops between Steve Taylor, Gabrielle Yeager, and Jack Quade; as personal conflicts spill over into the professional sphere, Steve and Jack even end up in a physical altercation. Finally, the wedding of Dan Goldman and Erica Templeton marks the first marriage ceremony to take place at ‘All Saints’ since 2003.

By the end of Season 11, when the fights have been fought and won, when newlyweds are beginning their lives together, when the ED family is settled and closer than ever, Admin has been given money to launch a full trauma unit that will introduce new characters to the mix.

== Cast ==
=== Main cast ===
- John Howard as Frank Campion
- Tammy Macintosh as Charlotte Beaumont
- Judith McGrath as Von Ryan
- Mark Priestley as Dan Goldman (until episode 39)
- Wil Traval as Jack Quade (until episode 39)
- Jolene Anderson as Erica Templeton (until episode 32)
- Allison Cratchley as Zoe Gallagher (until episode 20)
- Andrew Supanz as Bartholomew West
- Virginia Gay as Gabrielle Jaeger
- Jack Campbell as Steve Taylor
- Kip Gamblin as Adam Rossi (from episode 36)
- Ella Scott Lynch as Claire Anderson (from episode 37)
- Alix Bidstrup as Amy Fielding (from episode 26)
- John Waters as Mike Vlasek

=== Recurring cast ===
- Celeste Barber as Bree Matthews (22 episodes)
- Mike Smith as Heath Velaga (13 episodes)
- Renee Lim as Suzi Lau (11 episodes)
- Petra Yared as Rhiannon Wilson (11 episodes)
- Nicholas Bell as Oliver Maroney (8 episodes)
- Yael Stone as Ann-Maree Preston (7 episodes)
- Robert Jago as Luke Goldman (7 episodes)
- Genevieve Hegney as Juliet Martin (7 episodes)
- Sonia Todd as Elizabeth Foy (5 episodes)
- Penny Cook as Rhonda Goldman (5 episodes)

=== Guest cast ===
- Tracy Mann as Laura McDermott (3 episodes)
- Alexandra Davies as Cate McMasters (2 episodes)
- Wendy Strehlow as Lorraine Tanner (2 episodes)
- Will Snow as Simon McDermott (2 episodes)
- Nathaniel Dean as James Byrne (2 episodes)
- Leslie Dayman as Kevin Goldman (1 episode)

== Death of Mark Priestley ==
Actor Mark Priestley, who played Dan Goldman on the show, took his own life on 27 August 2008. As a result, the show's final two episodes had to be re-filmed. The Seven Network paid tribute with a video clip in the following episode, along with actor John Howard in a plea to all those with depression to get help.

Mark's final episode was aired on 18 November.

== Controversy ==
The Seven Network faced potential legal action after the airing of episode 432, "Never Tell" on 27 May 2008. The episode suggested that children with Down syndrome are a result of incestuous relationships, provoking advocacy group Down Syndrome Australia to lodge a complaint with the Human Rights and Equal Opportunity Commission and the Australian Communications and Media Authority, insisting that major advertisers in the show's timeslot boycott it and asking for a public apology from Seven. In the episode, a brother and sister are told that their unborn child is at risk of developing Down Syndrome as a result of their sexual relationship – according to Down Syndrome Australia, there is no evidence to support such a claim:

All Saints has stigmatised every person with Down syndrome and their families. We already know of one instance where a child has been victimised because of this episode.

— Peter Sloan, Down Syndrome Australia

Seven responded with an apology through a newspaper on 2 June.

All Saints values its audience and has the greatest respect for their commitment to the program. Without reservation, to any members of the audience who have found an element of a recent story offensive, Channel Seven apologises.

Down Syndrome Australia rejected the apology on 3 June, saying that the Seven Network's response was insufficient.:

We're not going to accept a wishy-washy attempt at an apology that's come second-hand through a newspaper. They must say once and for all that there is categorically no link between Down syndrome and incest. We'll give them the opportunity to make a retraction during tonight's episode before we formally pursue legal advice and write official letters of complaint to the show's advertisers.

— Catherine McAlpine, Down Syndrome Victoria

Until there's a formal recognition of error, it's not enough. First they flat refused to apologise at all, and now they've apologised if they happened to offended anyone. The next step is to broadcast a message saying 'if we implied Down syndrome is a product of incestuous relationships, we were wrong. It's an easy thing to do and the only way to put this thing to bed.

— Peter Sloan, Down Syndrome Australia

== Episodes ==
No. overall	No. in season	Title	Directed by	Written by	Original release date	Australian viewers (millions)
417	1	"Against the Wall – Part 2"	Peter Fisk	Sean Nash	12 February 2008	1.155
Frank's leadership is put to the ultimate test when the ED team is held hostage and a deadly plan unfolds. In the bedlam that follows, threats are made, tempers are stretched and lives are lost. And at the end of it, Frank makes a decision that looks likely to cost him his job.
418	2	"The Simple Things"	Geoffrey Cawthorn	Louise Crane-Bowes	19 February 2008	1.152
In the aftermath of the siege, Frank finds himself under fire from Admin for his comments to the media. The ED team are confronted by the arrival of one of their captors after a police shooting. Charlotte and Dan are challenged by a woman with a chronic case of hiccups, and Jack and Erica deal with an uncommunicative beating victim.
419	3	"Comfort Zone"	Lynn Hegarty	Peter Dick & Lily Taylor	26 February 2008	1.152
Frank hatches a plan to win the hearts and minds of the other department heads. Meanwhile, Bart and Ann-Maree return from holidays so she can undergo another set of tests. A routine homecare visit turns into trauma for Von.
420	4	"Event Horizon"	Lynn-Maree Danzey	Jeff Truman & Linda Stainton	4 March 2008	1.021
Bart tries to find comfort and distraction in work only to come up against one of the most difficult challenges he's had to face. Mike donates a kidney to save his son's life, but will old memories change his life?
421	5	"Caught in a Trap"	Nicholas Bufalo	Sally Webb	11 March 2008	1.172
Another of Steve's secrets is revealed as he, Dan and Charlotte treat a young woman who has attempted suicide. Ann-Maree, suffering considerable pain, is still refusing to contemplate any further cancer treatment and Bart is torn between respecting her wishes and doing everything within his power to prolong her life.
422	6	"Careful What You Wish For"	Geoffrey Cawthorn	Trent Atkinson	18 March 2008	1.093
Kimberly Dyer is brought into the ED in the throes of a seizure. While Charlotte and Erica fight to stabilise the girl, they quickly realise there's more going on here than meets the eye. And all the while, a worried mother is being supported by Von, who is becoming increasingly suspicious of her motives.
423	7	"Little Decisions"	Peter Fisk	Martin McKenna	25 March 2008	1.297
A horrific car accident is not the only reason behind Frank and Charlotte having to fight for a patient's life. Ann-Maree's health is deteriorating rapidly. Bart finds it impossible to be by her side until he can find some kind of answer to the awful request she made of him.
424	8	"Beginnings"	Martin Sacks	Denise Morgan	1 April 2008	1.073
Frank is called to the dying Ann-Maree's bedside by Von who is very conscious of the fact that Bart is unable to say good-bye and give her permission to die. Frank tells Bart that he has to put his own needs out of the equation and that this is a battle that can't be won and is about being selfless.
425	9	"When Tomorrow Comes"	Nicholas Buffalo	Sam Meikle	8 April 2008	1.077
Dan, Erica and Jack are running late for work when they find a middle-aged woman on the bonnet of Dan's car. After she is taken via ambulance to All Saints, it is soon discovered that her incoherence and her physical frailty is the result of Huntington's disease. In treating her and in talking with her daughter, Dan comes to an important decision about his own health.
426	10	"Out of the Fire"	Jessica Hobbs	Charlie Strachan	15 April 2008	1.185
Zoe, Jack and Dan fight to save the life of a young burns victim, having no idea how complex the situation will get when his mother arrives in the ED and asks them not to take further action to actively resuscitate him. Charlotte and Gabrielle struggle to unravel the mystery of a young woman who presents with severe stomach pain.
427	11	"It Ain't Necessarily So"	Jean-Pierre Mignon	Sean Nash	22 April 2008	1.184
A high profile athlete is found badly injured from a vicious attack. When he later accuses his teammate of being the attacker, Jack and Steve take sides over what should be done. On Bart's first day back in the ED following the death of Ann-Maree, a deserted wife who can't stop talking about her failed relationship is probably the last thing Bart needs, or is it exactly what he needs?
428	12	"The Hand You're Dealt"	Ian Watson	Blake Ayshford	29 April 2008	1.251
Cody is delivered to the ED after being hit by a car, and what appears to be a fairly straight forward case becomes a medical mystery with the patient declaring his long list of bad luck is the result of a curse. Charlotte's day has started off badly, Zac's still unwell and she's had to call in Rhiannon for the first time to look after him for the day.
429	13	"Stepping Up"	Martin Sacks	Robert Haywood	6 May 2008	1.202
The unexpected awakening of a comatose patient brings new trauma to the man's wife while igniting old feelings between Gabrielle and Steve. Dan's paraplegic brother, Luke, is brought in following a wheelchair basketball accident, but the secrets the two brothers are keeping from each other threaten Luke's recovery and Dan and Erica's relationship.
430	14	"The Circle of Life"	Ian Gilmourn	Jeff Truman & Jo Watson	13 May 2008	1.219
Steve is confronted by an addict who challenges all his medical and personal convictions. Jack races against time with an acutely schizophrenic woman about to give birth. Charlotte and Bart are set up by Frank to have their medical abilities (and their diplomacy skills) tested during a hospital training day.
431	15	"That Window in Time"	Peter Fisk	Sally Webb	20 May 2008	1.268
Disagreement over the treatment of a husband and wife involved in a car accident brings Steve and Jack into conflict. Angus, just twenty years old and with a burning ambition to become an international soccer player, has his dreams shattered by a surprising diagnosis.
432	16	"Never Tell"	Jean-Pierre Mignon	Fiona Kelly	27 May 2008	1.330
When a young pregnant woman is admitted after collapsing, the team are faced with a moral and ethical dilemma when they discover who the father is. A man is brought in having been bashed, and what first appears to be a random act of violence turns out to be much worse.
433	17	"Risky Business"	Andrew 'Killer' Bowden	Chris McCourt	3 June 2008	1.339
Mike, Jack and Erica attempt to help a man whose foolish attempt to impress his much younger wife has left him at risk of becoming a paraplegic. Charlotte and Zoe work well together while treating a reluctant hero, causing problems for Frank, who has been handed an unpleasant ultimatum from Admin.
434	18	"Under My Skin"	Jessica Hobbs	Trent Atkinson	10 June 2008	1.296
Charlotte is forced to contemplate her future at All Saints when she learns that there's no room for her there as a fellow in the ED. Bart, Erica and Steve struggle to care for a man suffering from an apparent psychotic break down. Having bonded with Charlotte during a patient's care, Rhiannon misreads the situation and makes a move on Charlotte, which Charlotte politely pulls out of.
435	19	"Blind Faith"	Ian Gilmourn	Lily Taylor	17 June 2008	1.380
A woman on the brink of marriage is revealed to have a shocking legacy from the past when her x-rays reveal not one but a number of needles embedded into her bowels and other organs. Von helps an elderly man make a decision about his future after his wife is admitted to the ED suffering from Alzheimer's and advanced pneumonia.
436	20	"Torn Apart"	Martin Sacks	Charlie Strachan	24 June 2008	1.300
Von is approached for help in the Hospital car park but when she finds herself in an abandoned tram factory, she has reason to regret her decision. She finds a pregnant woman in labour, a husband who fears the repercussions of their discovery, and a Government worker willing to risk it all to do the right thing - and Von can't walk away.
437	21	"Justice For None"	Jean-Pierre Mignon	Sean Nash	1 July 2008	1.148
Rhiannon convinces Charlotte to meet her away from All Saints in the hope of finding a way to reconcile their differences. Their showdown is interrupted by a brutal hit and run accident that will ultimately bring tragedy to the ED. Von finds an unlikely ally in her quest to help a family of illegal immigrants.
438	22	"Fearless and Searching"	Daniel Nettheim	Blake Ayshford	8 July 2008	1.274
Charlotte's day in court arrives. Her plan rests squarely on the strength of her character, but while her reputation as a doctor is impeccable, it is her personal life that is called into question once she takes the stand. Will Charlotte's plan backfire? Or will Rhiannon finally gather the courage to tell the truth?
439	23	"Bloodlines"	Jet Wilkinson	Denise Morgan	15 July 2008	1.356
A traumatised Charlotte brings Rhiannon into the ED after Rhiannon has attempted to end her life. As Frank, Jack and Gabrielle battle to save Rhiannon's life, Charlotte confronts the one person she thinks caused it all - Rhiannon's father. Erica and Steve are kept in the dark when Von and Mike take over the illegal refugee, Nadir's case.
440	24	"Sons and Lovers"	Ian Gilmourn	Jeff Truman	22 July 2008	1.407
Erica's hens night takes a turn for the worse when a pole dancing class goes wrong and the instructor comes off the pole and injures her wrist. But with Charlotte struggling to find her balance between her new 2-IC duties and doctoring the woman, will she miss a far more sinister diagnosis?
441	25	"Horses for Courses"	Marcus Cole	Trent Atkinson	29 July 2008	1.313
When a homecare patient is brought in after taking a lethal drug combination, it's up to Von, Bart and Frank to work out whether or not it was an accident. Dan reassesses his impending buck's night after two very drunk mates come in after a shocking accident.
442	26	"Wish List"	Nicholas Buffalo	Chris McCourt	5 August 2008	1.290
Frank's niece Amy starts work in the ED and makes a mistake which has tragic consequences for a patient. While treating a farmer brought into the ED after a tractor accident, Steve and Mike both go down with a mystery illness forcing Frank to take over an emergency surgery.
443	27	"Best Laid Plans"	Jean-Pierre Mignon	Louise Crane-Bowes	26 August 2008	1.273
Tragedy puts Erica and Dan's wedding at risk, with multiple traumas hitting the ED and Dan feeling responsible for the accident that brought them in. Dan feels helpless when a pre-wedding gag organised by his brother goes wrong and Dan finds himself tied to a tree while a horrific accident occurs right in front of him.
444	28	"Echoes"	Kate Woods	Sally Webb	2 September 2008	1.319
When Laszlo, a middle-aged man and professional Skydiver, arrives at All Saints after a skydiving accident, the team are expecting the worst. Mike bonds with a patient whose life story echoes his own; Von acts as an intermediary for a young man whose only hope of life lies with the family he's never met; and Jack tries to get through to a woman who refuses to face reality.
445	29	"Solitary Confinement"	Ian Gilmourn	Fiona Kelly	9 September 2008	N/A
Frank and Mike come face to face with a cold-blooded killer in solitary confinement at a high-security prison who forces them both to reconsider where their lives are going. While watching Steve and Amy very closely as they deal with what looks like a desperate suicide attempt, Gabrielle begins to question where Steve's motives lie.
446	30	"Better Safe Than Sorry"	Marcus Cole	Jenny Lewis	16 September 2008	N/A
Charlotte and Mike clash over the best way to deal with a patient, who has sustained a head injury in a road accident. As the woman is a single mother Charlotte wants to take no chances and she pushes for early surgery. But Mike believes surgery is unwarranted and adopts a wait and see approach.
447	31	"Not What You'd Expect"	Jean-Pierre Mignon	Sean Nash	23 September 2008	N/A
When Amy puts her foot in it with a heavily-disfigured patient, she feels the entire department is against her. A charming eccentric who's gambled with his life by self-medicating forces Jack to make a decision that has dire consequences. A new computer system complicates operations in the ED. Mike has bitten the bullet and phoned Juliet - whom he barely knows - for a date.
448	32	"Training Wheels"	Jet Wilkinson	Trent Atkinson	30 September 2008	N/A
Jack finds himself caught up in an MVA where a young mother is trapped and the only possible way of saving her is to amputate her legs. Mike forms a bond with a young patient from an MVA whose medical situation turns out to be far more dire than initially expected, and hides a personal secret.
449	33	"When the Party's Over"	Kay Pavlou	Andrew Kelly	7 October 2008	N/A
Three young adults land in Emergency after a house party, all suffering from different symptoms. Can the All Saints team discover the cause before it's too late? Dan attempts to conceal his fears about Erica's disappearance by throwing himself into work helping Mike remove a nail from a man's hand, but that may prove harder than expected.
450	34	"Out on a Limb"	Cherie Nowlan	Charlie Strachan	14 October 2008	N/A
Steve and Gabrielle fight to save the life of a worker who has suffered long-term exposure to chemicals. Elsewhere, Von and Charlotte treat the worker's boss, who is suffering similar but lesser symptoms. Does he know more than he's telling?
451	35	"Running For Cover"	Lynn-Maree Danzey	Clare Atkinson	21 October 2008	N/A
When two victims of an armed robbery are brought in, the All Saints team are pushed to the limit. Already two nurses down, it's all hands on deck. Mike, Charlotte and Gabrielle deal with Rohan, a store owner who has been shot twice during the hold-up. When his condition spirals out of control, Charlotte and Mike debate how to best keep him alive.
452	36	"Reality Check"	Kate Woods	Chris McCourt	28 October 2008	N/A
Jack's ability to function as a doctor is called into question when Frank gives him an ultimatum. After going on a fruitless search for Erica with Bart, Dan is forced to face the possibility that something terrible has happened to his wife.
453	37	"Secrets and Lies"	Jet Wilkinson	Trent Atkinson	4 November 2008	N/A
Dan and Bart deal with a complicated pregnancy scenario that serves to heighten Dan's sense of loss about Erica. Claire, the new Agency Nurse, is unrelenting in her quest to find out what happened to a man who has been badly assaulted. Adam's first day at All Saints sees him dealing with a young man who appears to be suffering from alcohol poisoning after his best mate's 21st.
454	38	"A Safe Place"	Ian Watson	Sally Webb	11 November 2008	N/A
New nurse Claire is tested on her first day, full time, in the ED. Gabrielle puts Claire to work with a desperately ill, and very difficult patient. Dan prickles against Claire, seeing her as Erica's replacement. With grief from her patient, and from a colleague, it's a tough start.
455	39	"Spinning Out"	Kay Pavlou	Fiona Kelly	18 November 2008	N/A
A high-speed crash at a raceway leaves a young man struggling to cope with the consequences of his actions and Mike questioning the decision he makes to honour a dying patient's wish. Dan's life is gradually returning to a type of normal - until the police arrive wanting to talk to him about Erica.
456	40	"Time Bomb"	Lynn-Maree Danzey	Alexa Wyatt	25 November 2008	N/A
A worker from a car parts factory, brought into the ED after an explosion at her workplace, is discovered to have a bizarre but deadly injury that could spell disaster for her as well as the entire Emergency Department. The scenario takes all of Frank and Mike's ingenuity and courage to come up with a solution.
