= Fiona Kelly =

Fiona Kelly may refer to:

- Fiona Kelly (author)
- Fiona Kelly (writer) on All Saints (season 12)
- Fiona Kelly, character in Raw (TV series)
- Fiona Kelly, singer on The Voice UK (series 3)
