= Morley High School =

Morley High School may refer to:

- Morley Senior High School, Noranda, Western Australia. Formerly known as Morley High School.
- The Morley Academy, West Yorkshire, England. Formerly known as Morley High School.
