= Dead on Time =

Dead on Time could mean:

- "Dead on Time" (1978), single from the rock band Queen on their album Jazz
- Dead on Time (1983), British short film directed by Lyndall Hobbs and written by Richard Curtis and Rowan Atkinson
- Dead on Time (1988), novel in the Inspector Ghote series from English crime fiction writer H. R. F. Keating
- "Dead on Time" (1992), episode of the British television series Inspector Morse
- "Dead on Time" (1996), episode of the British television series Murder Most Horrid
- Dead on Time (1999), British short film directed by James Larkin and written by Larkin and Jon Sen
- "Dead on Time" (2000), episode of the Australian medical drama All Saints
- Dead on Time (2007), novel by South African writer Glyn Jones
- Dead on Time (2009), novel by Indian-British writer, economist, and Labour politician Meghnad Desai, Baron Desai
