= All Saints season 10 =

All Saints
- Season 10
- 2007 Season DVD
- No. of episodes: 41

Release
- Original network: Seven Network
- Original release: 13 February – 20 November 2007

Season chronology
- ← Previous; Season 9 Next → Season 11

The tenth season of the long-running Australian medical drama All Saints began airing on 13 February 2007 and concluded on 20 November 2007 with a total of 41 episodes.

== Plot ==
With the team still reeling from the shooting of Bart West it's all hands to the pump to save his life as well as keep the Emergency Department operating at full steam. The team show strengths they didn't know they had, forge new friendships and relationships that both tantalise and shock us, and re-establish themselves as the best ED staff in the country.

Season 10 also sees two of the team leave, one in tragic circumstances - Sean Everleigh - the other to the promise of love - Vincent Hughes. We celebrate the birth of Charlotte Beaumont's baby Zachary, see the return of Cate McMasters from a drug overdose and take the emotional journey with Jack Quade as he deals with a dark secret. There will be two romances to delight in - Dan Goldman and Erica Templeton - and new friendships to explore - Zoe Gallagher and nurse Gabrielle Jaeger. And all of this will continue to play out under the Captaincy of Frank Campion.

== Cast ==
=== Main cast ===
- John Howard as Frank Campion
- Alexandra Davies as Cate McMasters
- Tammy Macintosh as Charlotte Beaumont
- Christopher Gabardi as Vincent Hughes (until episode 21)
- Judith McGrath as Von Ryan
- Mark Priestley as Dan Goldman
- Wil Traval as Jack Quade
- Chris Vance as Sean Everleigh (until episode 18)
- Jolene Anderson as Erica Templeton
- Allison Cratchley as Zoe Gallagher
- Andrew Supanz as Bartholomew West
- Virginia Gay as Gabrielle Jaeger
- Jack Campbell as Steve Taylor (from episode 26)
- John Waters as Mike Vlasek (from episode 4)

=== Recurring cast ===
- Mike Smith as Heath Velaga (26 episodes)
- Celeste Barber as Bree Matthews (17 episodes)
- Alexandra Fowler as Eve Ballantyne (9 episodes)
- Wendy Strehlow as Lorraine Tanner (7 episodes)
- Yael Stone as Ann-Maree Preston (7 episodes)
- Rebecca Ritters as Rachel Simms (6 episodes)
- Pip Miller as Patrick Wesley (5 episodes)
- Anthony Gee as Travis Knight (5 episodes)
- Will Snow as Simon McDermott (5 episodes)

=== Guest cast ===
- Tracy Mann as Laura McDermott (3 episodes)
- Nathaniel Dean as James Byrne (3 episodes)
- Sonia Todd as Elizabeth Foy (2 episodes)
- Peter Phelps as Doug Spencer (1 episode)
- Peta Sergeant as Bianca Frost (1 episode)
- Jay Gallagher as AJ Templeton (1 episode)
- Frank Gallacher as Bruce Campion (1 episode)
- Karen Cobban as Therese McMasters (1 episode)

== Episodes ==
No. overall	No. in season	Title	Directed by	Written by	Original release date	Australian viewers (millions)
376	1	"Family Matters"	Kevin Carlin	Louise Crane-Bowes	13 February 2007	1.081
Vincent and Jack fight to save Bart's life in the Operating Theatre as Frank finds himself eaten up with worry and guilt over the shooting. Meanwhile, Dan is still stuck in his house with Erica's brother AJ who has a serious injury. Even with his best efforts it looks as if Dan could very well fail in his quest to save a life.
377	2	"The Hardest Word"	Lynn Hegarty	Sean Nash	20 February 2007	1.389
Everyone is on edge as Bart recovers from his gunshot wounds and they are all facing the death of Erica's brother. Cate, out jogging as part of a concerted plan to turn her life around, is the first person on the scene of a horrific MVA. She's forced into radically treating one of the victims, Brian MacPherson, much to the horror of his girlfriend Lisa.
378	3	"Thresholds"	Lynn-Maree Danzey	Kevin Roberts	27 February 2007	1.381
Erica has to do some detective work to find out why a teenage boy's health is deteriorating. Meanwhile, a car crash at a motel sees two patients admitted to the Emergency Department where the cause of the crash creates controversy. Elsewhere, Frank and Vincent clash over Bart's recovery.
379	4	"Smoke and Mirrors"	Martin Sacks	Andrew Kelly	6 March 2007	1.247
Mike Vlasek returns to the ED after a six-month detox for morphine addiction to discover Frank and Jack have problems just as serious as his own. Frank's obsession with Bart's recovery has consequences for Zoe and Gabrielle, who struggle to cover for Frank's absence with Zoe missing a diagnosis which sends her patient Sharon into renal failure.
380	5	"The Hearts of Men"	Peter Fisk	Peter Neale & Blake Ayshford	13 March 2007	1.357
Mike and Zoe clash over the treatment of Josh, a methamphetamine addict, who is unwilling to face the reality that he is an addict. With Bart due to be discharged from the hospital Frank decides the best way for Bart to stand on his own two feet is to take him home with him. A woman is brought in with a serious hand injury.
381	6	"A Fresh Start"	Bill Hughes	Fiona Kelly	20 March 2007	1.510
Cate's first day back sees her dealing with a heavily pregnant woman trapped in a car following an MVA. Cate and her partner Heath are forced to deliver the baby beside the wreck. Bart's first night out of hospital has been a long one and he is working hard to keep up appearances for Frank's sake.
382	7	"Back on Track"	Pino Amenta	Charlie Strachan	27 March 2007	1.576
Cate and Heath arrive at a park where a group of friends have set up a makeshift horizontal bungee catapult. One young man has died and the other is critically injured. Cate becomes obsessed with finding out the truth surrounding the accident. Bart forces himself to be overly optimistic about his first day at rehab.
383	8	"What Lies Beneath"	Lynn Hegarty	Jeff Truman	3 April 2007	1.533
Mike feels hamstrung by the protocols that he must observe if he is to continue as a doctor. A teenager with cystic fibrosis almost kills himself trying to live a normal life. Frank begs Eve not to have an Amniocentesis, but Eve needs to know that their baby is healthy. Charlotte goes into labour.
384	9	"The Blink of an Eye"	Daina Reid	Peter Gawler	10 April 2007	1.609
Teenage BMX rider Guy has a crush on teenage equestrian Tully. This particular morning he evidently got too close to her, spooking her horse and sending her flying - and getting a serious kick in the side for his trouble. Guy is in agony while Tully lays still, conscious but feeling nothing below her chest.
385	10	"Life's Little Miracles"	Nicholas Buffalo	John Banas	17 April 2007	1.603
As Eve and Frank reach a heartbreaking decision, Frank is able to pull the team together and bring about the miraculous saving of Levi Joseph when he is terribly injured in a traffic accident. Zoe is livid when Bart neglects his patients in favour of the extraordinary surgical case. Jack is surprised when he realises his dark past is still affecting his judgement.
386	11	"Life Interrupted"	Jean Pierre Mignon	Sam Meikle	24 April 2007	1.496
In his grief, Frank is determined to throw himself into his work and everyone else's. This brings him into conflict with everyone who comes in contact with him: Mike as they argue over the best course of treatment for a trauma patient; Sean as he struggles to diagnose a young mother's mystery illness; and Gabrielle as the battle lines are drawn over the ED's administration.
387	12	"Choices of the Heart"	Peter Fisk	Sean Nash	8 May 2007	1.236
Bart and Erica try to help a woman who presents with Delusional Parasitosis. A young athlete's future hangs in the balance when he is brought into the ED after having both feet nearly severed by a train. Bart and Erica make a surprising discovery about Von's personal life. An announcement catches the whole Emergency Department by surprise.
388	13	"Balancing Act"	Bill Hughes	Sally Webb	15 May 2007	1.367
Bart is starting to buckle under the pressure of catching up the weeks of his internship he missed after the shooting. Running on no sleep, he tries to work out what could be wrong with a young woman who has been admitted with abdominal pain. An excavator operator has rolled his machine on himself and has suffered severe abdominal crush injuries.
389	14	"Timing"	Peter Phelps	Trent Atkinson	22 May 2007	1.278
Dan and Erica rescue Benny, a terrified man with a mental age of 10, whom they witness being beaten by a gang on their way to work. In the ED, Benny confides that he's been on the streets for three days hiding from "Mr. Terry" who's trying to kill him. Von, with her gut instincts working overtime, thinks there may be more to the story.
390	15	"Some Kinds of Love"	Lynn-Maree Danzey	Andrew Kelly	29 May 2007	1.333
Kenya Hutton is brought to the Hospital with bruising and abrasions. It appears that she has been sexually assaulted, but she has no memory of it. Matters are further complicated when her husband accuses her of cheating on him. He works nights and has arrived home twice to find his wife showing all the signs of having been out for a night on the town.
391	16	"End Game"	Nicholas Bufalo	Chris McCourt	5 June 2007	1.430
An unidentified patient is brought in by ambulance, having been hit by a bus. Frank, Mike, Zoe and Dan fight to stabilise him, but the task is proving almost impossible. Mike is all for taking him up to surgery straight away, but Zoe has other ideas. Von visits a favourite homecare patient, a dying nun and ex matron at All Saints.
392	17	"The Trust Game"	Peter Fisk	Michael Miller	12 June 2007	1.447
Barry Mitchell is rushed into the ED having been involved in an MVA. He is suffering from shock, and is presenting with breathing difficulties and a possible ruptured spleen. Intriguing for the ED team, is that Barry is dressed only in jeans. The real story is revealed when Carl Woodman sneaks his way into the ED and attacks Barry.
393	18	"Precious Moments"	Tony Krawitz	Fiona Kelly	19 June 2007	1.503
Shock waves spread through the ED when Sean is wheeled in on a stretcher after being hit by a car. The team is put under extra pressure when Sean tells them he doesn't want Zoe to know the extent of his injuries, maintaining a brave front for her. Elsewhere, a young family is determined to spend every last minute together.
394	19	"The Pain Of It All"	Peter Phelps	Kevin Roberts	26 June 2007	1.435
Mia's a young woman at her wit's end as she suffers from an unknown condition that leaves her in constant pain during every waking moment. Her latest acute attack, lasting 20 hours, has driven her into the ED where she hopes Bart and Frank will finally be able to name her disease and offer the promise of an eventual cure.
395	20	"Crossroads"	Jean-Pierre Mignon	Charlie Strachan	3 July 2007	1.541
Jack is forced to confront his history of abuse when his abuser, Patrick Wesley, is brought into the ED with multiple stab wounds. Charlotte and Zoe clash when Megan Archer is brought into the ED after collapsing in the street. It is clear she has just given birth, but with an emotional age of seven she is unable to say where the baby was abandoned.
396	21	"Bodies in Motion"	Lynn-Maree Danzey	Sam Meikle	10 July 2007	1.464
When a father and son are brought in after a horror MVA, Frank and Von make a terrible discovery. Bart and Erica are challenged by a post-operative patient who refuses to comply with her recovery requirements. Having tested himself last week, Mike is ready to embrace the ups and downs of life which makes Jack nervous.
397	22	"One Moment in Time"	Peter Fisk	Sean Nash	17 July 2007	1.419
A Hep C patient, Adriana, walks into All Saints declaring herself to be at end-stage liver failure. As Dan listens to Adriana's heartbreaking story he accidentally gives himself a needle injury, contaminating himself with Adriana's blood. In that one second, his whole life changes. Bart wonders if his medical career is over when he performs a procedure above his level.
398	23	"Bad Blood"	Tony Krawitz	Sally Webb & Lily Taylor	24 July 2007	1.362
A man's relatively minor injuries, sustained when he and his camera got too close to the action at a game of Australian Rules, are seriously compounded by a rare blood disease. Bart deals with a patient admitted with what appears to be a textbook case of appendicitis, but she would rather risk death than allow Jack, or any surgeon, anywhere near her.
399	24	"Push Me, Pull You"	Peter Phelps	Sally Webb & Lily Taylor	31 July 2007	1.362
Zoe and Charlotte are at each other's throats as Zoe grieves the death of her boyfriend and Charlotte's partner is going back to Africa with or without her. Two middle aged brother's bickering brings one of them to the brink of death. Hormone therapy proves almost deadly to a man undergoing gender reassignment.
400	25	"Pressure Point"	Martin Sacks	Jeff Truman	24 July 2007	1.453
Mike arrives at the scene of a multiple-victim MVA at a drag race, where one car has flipped on its side. The other, after cutting a swathe of death and injury through a bunch of spectators, has trapped a brother and sister. Cate promises the dying sister, Claire, that she will ensure Claire's little brother makes it out of the accident alive.
401	26	"Under the Skin"	Daina Reid	Sarah Lambert	7 August 2007	1.426
The victim of a brutal beating hides a devastating secret that puts the ED team in danger. Gabrielle is forced to face her past when Frank conducts interviews for a new ED doctor. An OCD patient is so desperate to get his hands clean that he uses a toxin that may kill him.
402	27	"Mixed Blessings"	Peter Fisk	Julie Edwards	14 August 2007	1.370
After winning the lottery, a couple are victims in a brutal home invasion. It is Steve Taylor's first shift on the job as the new ED doctor and thoughts of an easy day soon disappear when he encounters his first patient. Dan gets his latest round of Hep C results. Meanwhile, Frank tells Bart that there's no room in the ED for him anymore.
403	28	"Nowhere to Hide"	Lynn Hegarty	Kevin Roberts	21 August 2007	1.341
Travis Knight fails to appear for a court appearance and Jack sets about finding out why. A Vietnam veteran presents with health problems that stem back to his war service, and a mechanic's effort to provide some financial security for his family backfires. Bart deals with Dan and Erica's blossoming relationship.
404	29	"Persona Non Grata"	Daniel Nettheim	Michael Miller	28 August 2007	1.364
Frank and Zoe take drastic measures to try and obtain funding to keep Bart at All Saints. Meanwhile, Mike makes an offer the Intern would be mad to refuse. Both Jack and Steve are forced to take responsibility for their actions. Charlotte appears to be having troubles in her home life as she tries to determine the cause of a woman's recurring headaches.
405	30	"Running on Impulse"	Jean-Pierre Mignon	Sam Meikle	4 September 2007	1.388
When a battered bodybuilder refuses treatment, Mike enlists Cate's help resulting in both painful and romantic consequences. A recalcitrant diabetic prompts a hungover Steve to dish out some tough love; Gabrielle wonders if Steve will practice what he preaches. Jack's private life comes spilling out when a young woman is brought in, the victim of domestic violence.
406	31	"Reality Check"	Nicholas Bufalo	Charlie Strachan & Sacha Hamilton	11 September 2007	1.390
Cate and Heath have their drug bag stolen at an accident site. Zoe and Charlotte are forced to work as a team together to save a young patient's life. Gabrielle is forced to make the most painful decision of her life and tell Frank that Steve is drinking on the job. When Von discovers a patient is violently abusing his wife, she and Frank must work together to help his wife.
407	32	"If Only"	Lynn-Maree Danzey	Sean Nash	18 September 2007	1.412
A bystander traumatized by assisting at the site of a horrific car crash develops an obsession with the victim he saved. When Jack's ex-landlady is brought into the Emergency Department; she helps Jack make some decisions about his future. Gabrielle blames herself for the pressure the ED is under.
408	33	"Lost and Found"	Pino Amenta	Peter Dick & Megan Herbert	25 September 2007	0.962
Bart is helpless in the face of a difficult patient who refuses treatment for a life threatening infection and comes to a crossroads in his career. Dan refuses to accept the onset of flu-like symptoms may be the onset of full blown Hep C, despite Erica being concerned. Jack is on his first day back in E.D. and he deals with a woman who has a heart complaint.
409	34	"No Stranger"	Jean-Pierre Mignon	Sally Webb	2 October 2007	1.253
Mike takes over the case of Simon McDermott, a young officer in the Australian Army, who is admitted to Resus having suffered a couple of seizures. When a CT scan reveals he has a large, inoperable aneurysm in his brain, Jack makes the decision to attempt a controversial and risky intervention to save the man's life.
410	35	"Throw Your Arms Around Me"	Peter Fisk	Jeff Truman	9 October 2007	1.306
Frank welcomes Bart back to the ED. His first case is Ann-Maree, a former patient with suspected chickenpox but whose symptoms point to a far more serious diagnosis. As the two put the issues of their last meeting behind them and begin to grow closer, Bart struggles to tell Ann-Maree that she has cancer, which is noted by Frank and quite a few others.
411	36	"Open Hearts"	Lynn Hegarty	Chris McCourt	16 October 2007	1.374
Charlotte and Jack take different sides on a patient who's brought into the emergency department after a failed abortion. Dan cannot seem to tell Erica that he is not going to Hep C counseling, and Steve moves out of Gabrielle's apartment. Meanwhile, Mike tries to save a patient who's throat was cut by his friend who was trying to save him.
412	37	"True Confessions"	Aarne Neeme	Trent Atkinson	23 October 2007	1.354
Tegan Willis is traumatised and looking for her boyfriend who fell off their balcony last night. Bart finds her wandering the streets and leads her into the ED where Charlotte and Frank take over. Colin Corrigan seems to be suffering from an almost perfect, textbook case of appendicitis.
413	38	"Precious Time"	Jean-Pierre Mignon	Shelley Birse	30 October 2007	1.483
Frank's frustration with hospital bureaucracy reaches boiling point. Mike is plagued by guilt after Simon falls down the hospital stairs in the middle of their argument. Dan locks horns with new Psychiatric Consultant, Elizabeth Foy, and Von confronts Bart about his involvement with Ann-Maree. Steve causes a stir when he returns to the ED and asks for his job back.
414	39	"Cutting Free"	Nicholas Bufalo	Michael Miller	6 November 2007	1.316
Dan starts his Hep C treatment and the side effects start to cause problems. He ends up being sent home by Gabrielle after reacting badly to comments made by amputee Ben Quilty. Director of Medicine Oliver Maroney tries to find out who leaked details of the hospital bed malfunction to a dead patient's widow.
415	40	"Thin Ice"	Marcus Cole	Sam Meikle & Louise Crane-Bowes	13 November 2007	1.311
Gabrielle, Jack, Erica, and Heath attend an ice-hockey game where a fight ensues between a fan and one of the players, resulting in another team player's throat being cut by an ice skate blade. Charlotte and Dan are confronted with a medical mystery as a woman is brought in suffering from a bout of uncontrollable coughing of blood.
416	41	"Against the Wall - Part 1"	Tony Krawitz	Charlie Strachan	20 November 2007	1.326
Frank and Dan treat a 13-year-old girl, Georgina, suffering end stage heart failure. When a donor heart suddenly becomes available the ED team has two hours to check for a match and prepare her for transfer to the hospital where her new heart is waiting. When they begin the rush transfer, they find that the Ambo Bay door won't open. What's going on?
