= All Saints season 12 =

All Saints
- Season 12
- 2009 Season DVD
- No. of episodes: 37

Release
- Original network: Seven Network
- Original release: 3 February – 27 October 2009

Season chronology
- ← Previous; Season 11

The twelfth and final season of the long-running Australian medical drama All Saints: Medical Response Unit began airing on 3 February 2009 with the final episode airing 27 October 2009. The season concluded after 37 episodes.

== Plot ==
In its 12th and final year, the newly formed Medical Response Unit (MRU) takes centre stage treating patients at the site of accidents and then bringing them to the Emergency Department for continued medical care. The MRU, led by Mike Vlasek, is on the front line of a vast range of medical disasters, including an explosion at a winery and a devastating bus crash. The year starts with the ED team dealing with the shocking aftermath of the news of Erica's death. Bart and Amy continue to be at logger-heads until Bart's wise counsel to a troubled patient results in them starting a secret love affair. Steve joins the MRU and is confronted with demons from his past. Gabrielle must deal with her father's heart attack and new paramedic Jo learns whether she has Huntington's disease. Frank continues to fiercely protect his team, and starts the new intern program. The series ends with the ED and MRU teams sharing an emotional farewell dinner in honour of long time All Saints nurse, Von Ryan.

== Cast ==
=== Main ===
- John Howard as Frank Campion
- Tammy Macintosh as Charlotte Beaumont
- Judith McGrath as Von Ryan
- Andrew Supanz as Bartholomew West
- Virginia Gay as Gabrielle Jaegar
- Jack Campbell as Steve Taylor
- Kip Gamblin as Adam Rossi
- Ella Scott Lynch as Claire Anderson
- Alix Bidstrup as Amy Fielding
- Mirrah Foulkes as Jo Mathieson
- John Waters as Miklos Vlasek

=== Recurring ===
- Celeste Barber as Bree Matthews (31 episodes)
- Anna Volska as Katerina Ajanovic (9 episodes)
- Jonathan Wood as Elliott Parker (9 episodes)
- Tom Oakley as Ian Kingsley (8 episodes)
- Sarah Woods as Debra Rossi (7 episodes)

=== Guest ===
- Curtis Oakes as Ben Jaeger (3 episodes)
- Genevieve Hegney as Juliet Martin (2 episodes)
- John Sheerin as Russell Jaeger (2 episodes)
- Mike Smith as Heath Velaga (1 episode)
- Renee Lim as Suzi Lau (1 episode)

== Revamp ==
In 2009, another attempt to stem the softening ratings and add a bit of excitement to the series, Seven Network executives decided to rejuvenate again, introducing a medical response unit to deal with tricky rescues which involved a helicopter going to remote locations to rescue patients who needed assistance. They would then bring those patients back to the ED and the staff there would assist in their treatment. Along with the addition of the new "department" the show was also renamed to All Saints: Medical Response Unit, the introduction of Mirrah Foulkes and the new MRU proved to lift the ratings substantially, but then levelled out at where they were prior to the revamp.

== Cancellation ==
In June 2009, after months of rumours that the cancellation of All Saints was imminent, a spokeswoman from the Seven Network informed The Daily Telegraph that the episode order had been trimmed. Season twelve of All Saints would screen 24 episodes instead of the usual 40 episodes and that production would cease in August instead of November.

In July 2009, exactly one month later after the first announcement, Tim Worner, Seven's Director of Programming at the time announced that All Saints had been cancelled. He told Michael Idato of the Sydney Morning Herald, "All Saints is a show which Seven and viewers have loved. However, an audience shift and increased production costs are behind this tough decision." He also informed Idato that the episode order trim had been reverted and the season would complete a 37 episode order, finishing on episode 493. It was reported after the announcement that since the introduction of the MRU in 2009 it inflated the cost of each episode to $500,000. Many people still argue as to why the MRU was introduced in the first place or should have been removed instead of axing the show if the network was wanting to cut costs.

In the Feb/Mar 2010 GQ magazine in 2010, Tim Worner said his one regret was "Axing All Saints. But it was the right call at the time and we have two new drama projects in development."

== Episodes ==
No. overall	No. in season	Title	Directed by	Written by	Original release date
457	1	"Out of the Ashes"	Ian Gilmour	Louise Crane-Bowes	3 February 2009
A boating accident in a remote river location has left four people injured and stranded without medical help.
458	2	"Dreams and Nightmares"	Jet Wilkinson	Sean Nash	10 February 2009
A brutally bashed cabbie and his assailant come face to face in the ED creating a medical mystery for Steve; a Bride arriving in the ED instead of her church inadvertently gets Bart and Amy working together, and Mike has difficulty juggling new directions in both his personal and professional lives.
459	3	"Day One"	Samantha Lang	Trent Atkinson	17 February 2009
It's the first day of official operation for Mike's MRU team, and the adrenaline is pumping as they are called out to a precarious rescue in the National Park. Two paragliders have come to grief on a remote cliff-face, and a daring vertical rescue is soon in operation.
460	4	"Sins of the Past"	Marcus Cole	Jenny and Lesley Lewis	24 February 2009
Steve is confronted with demons from his past when he attends a car accident involving Gabrielle's father and brother. Meanwhile, all is not what it seems with a patient and her husband, and Bart finds himself in an impossible situation.
461	5	"Evil Is As Evil Does"	Jean-Pierre Mignon	Denise Morgan	3 March 2009
Time runs out for the Medical Response Unit when a simple rescue escalates into a horrific tale of despair involving children. Meanwhile, Bart and Amy once again come to loggerheads when they try to deal with a manic patient who refuses treatment. Then, Frank turns to hands-on care with a patient whose life force is being sucked out of her by the pressures of 21st-century living.
462	6	"Facing the Music"	Nicholas Buffalo	Michael Miller	10 March 2009
The solidarity of the Medical Response Unit is put to the test when Mike makes a controversial call at a rescue.
463	7	"Awake in Fright"	Daniel Nettheim	Lily Taylor	17 March 2009
Claire is terrified when her past finally catches up with her, while Adam helps a seriously ill woman confront her feelings of guilt - and learns some home truths about himself in the process.
464	8	"Behind Closed Doors"	Jet Wilkinson	Sally Webb	24 March 2009
Steve puts himself in grave peril at the scene of a domestic siege when he ignores MRU protocol and enters the house where a young man has taken his parents hostage. Claire's past continues to menace her when Ian returns to confront Claire.
465	9	"Danger Zone"	Ian Gilmourn	Fiona Kelly	31 March 2009
A psychotic patient on an Ice rage turns the ED into a danger zone. Frank goes to extreme lengths to uncover the deadly secret he's hiding. But will it be in time?
466	10	"Pushed Too Far"	Marcus Cole	Chris McCourt & Linda Stainton	21 April 2009
Violence has resulted in Mike, Steve and Jo fighting desperately for the life of a man crushed in a car compactor. Claire's fear of Ian, her old boyfriend, turns into her worst nightmare. A casual affair turns a man's life upside down when the woman takes drastic action to keep him.
467	11	"Handle With Care"	Jean-Pierre Mignon	Andrew Kelly	28 April 2009
When Steve calls in sick, Mike and Jo have to crew the MRU Unit alone, finding themselves in a situation that tests them to the limits. Steve and Gabrielle care for Claire after she has been sexually assaulted.
468	12	"The Devil Within"	Cherie Nowlan	Sean Nash	5 May 2009
Steve's anger at being unable to help Claire in the aftermath of her rape creates tension with his workmates and patients. A female prisoner who deliberately swallowed a toothbrush for a day out of jail opens up the past for Claire and Adam in a surprisingly similar way.
469	13	"Give and Take"	Ian Watson	Trent Atkinson	12 May 2009
Bart has to think outside the square to help a well-travelled patient who is suffering from a mysterious infection. Tragedy strikes a young girl who comes in with breathing difficulties. Steve makes a connection with a woman trapped in a motor vehicle, while Claire develops a similar rapport with the victim's best friend.
470	14	"When the Bough Breaks"	Lynn-Maree Danzey	Jeff Truman	19 May 2009
A devastating bus crash impacts heavily on the MRU team. Adam's past affects his treatment of a mentally ill patient. Von becomes the meat in the sandwich between Adam and his mother.
471	15	"Seeing The Light"	Ian Gilmourn	Alexa Wyatt	26 May 2009
A life-threatening rescue in a grain silo appears to be the straw that finally breaks invincible Jo. Meanwhile, an elderly man presents with serious symptoms which turn out to be connected in the most unexpected way.
472	16	"We All Fall Down"	Geoff Bennett	Clare Atkinson	2 June 2009
The MRU find their lives in danger, when Ian returns on a mission to win Claire back and get Steve out of the picture once and for all. Amy is far from thrilled when someone from Bart's past turns up as a patient. Frank's fear that he is losing his passion for the ED has him thinking about a possible career change.
473	17	"Bodies in Motion"	Jet Wilkinson	Lily Taylor	9 June 2009
Frank is forced to make a decision about his future. Amy gets some home truths from a patient with a rare infection and a broken heart. Charlotte and Von treat a woman who's allergic to the world around her.
474	18	"On Second Thoughts..."	Ian Watson	Sally Webb	16 June 2009
Frank is looking for a new direction and starts the day in a disturbingly good mood. Meanwhile, Bart is stumped by a home renovator's mysterious deterioration. Plus, Amy and Charlotte treat a woman who risked her life for a tree and the MRU team is called out to treat a man whose sexual fantasy has got him into a tight spot.
475	19	"Starting Over"	Marcus Cole	Fiona Kelly	23 June 2009
Frank's intern program gets off to a shaky start with the ED's newest recruit giving Frank more than he bargained for. Meanwhile, Adam's sent into a spin when his mother turns up wanting to start over and a father and daughter's lives hang in the balance when a weekend away turns to tragedy.
476	20	"Curve Balls"	Lynn-Maree Danzey	Chris McCourt	30 June 2009
When a patient's life is destroyed by alcohol, Gabrielle pushes Steve to a decision that will have a devastating result. Meanwhile, a new intern reveals her hidden skills to Frank when she intervenes to save a surfer from paralysis, and a young patient's well-laid plans are threatened by a devastating illness, causing Bart to reassess his life.
477	21	"Test of Faith"	Ian Gilmourn	Blake Ayshford	7 July 2009
A pregnant cult member's rare allergic reaction puts her life, and that of her baby, in grave peril. Steve and Claire come to the end of their road, via very different paths. Frank finds doing an easy favour for a colleague much harder than he imagined.
478	22	"Blood is Thicker"	Jean-Pierre Mignon	Martin McKenna	14 July 2009
Adam faces death when mindless violence spills into the All Saints ED. Meanwhile, Frank accidentally discovers the appalling secret Katerina is carrying and Von is presented with the opportunity of re-evaluating her relationship with Adam when she deals with a grief-stricken mother.
479	23	"Out of Control"	Jet Wilkinson	Lesley and Jenny Lewis	21 July 2009
Jo is pulled out of her comfort zone when she falls for Declan, a stuntman at the centre of an accident involving multiple injuries. Steve comes under fire when he fails to notice a patient under his care has critical injuries.
480	24	"In Trust"	Di Drew	Trent Atkinson	28 July 2009
The MRU is called out to the same location twice after a local butcher abuses his position of power. Meanwhile, Adam and Von help a pregnant schoolgirl whose situation is more complex than first thought, and a journalist proves a handful for the staff.
481	25	"In Duty Bound"	Marcus Cole	Denise Morgan	4 August 2009
Frank is in danger of losing his perspective on Katerina as she deals with a punch-drunk patient. Meanwhile, Jo's boyfriend's rejection of having a medical before his next stunt leads her to confront her own fears, and sisters fighting over their mother's life have a profound effect on Von.
482	26	"The Waiting Game"	Lynn-Maree Danzey	Lily Taylor	11 August 2009
Jo learns whether or not she has Huntington's disease. Meanwhile, Von realises that she must tell Adam the truth about his mother's sudden reappearance and after a night out with Frank, Katerina starts making her presence felt in the ED.
483	27	"A Precious Waste"	Ian Gilmourn	Clare Atkinson	18 August 2009
Katerina goes to drastic lengths to win back Frank's approval. A tragic accident makes Jo reassess her priorities.
484	28	"Tell-Tale Hearts"	Jean-Pierre Mignon	Trent Atkinson	25 August 2009
Gabrielle is forced to confront her worst fears when her father suffers another heart attack. Bart is mortified when Amy comes up with a controversial solution for a patient who looks likely to die a virgin.
485	29	"Moving On"	Jet Wilkinson	Fiona and Andrew Kelly	1 September 2009
Adam joins the Medical Rescue Unit for a dangerous mine rescue with a deadly twist.
486	30	"Safe Haven"	Scott Hartford Davis	Chris McCourt	8 September 2009
When Jo is affected by the abusive horror of an illegal brothel, she ends up putting her own life in danger.
487	31	"Win Some, Lose Some"	Marcus Cole	Andrew Kelly	15 September 2009
The MRU is called to a horse training facility where three people are injured, and Mike must choose which patient to save.
488	32	"What it Takes"	Lynn-Maree Danzey	Trent Atkinson	22 September 2009
Mike finds himself going out on a limb when the unit is called out to rescue a girl who has been kidnapped by her father.
489	33	"Too Close For Comfort"	Jean-Pierre Mignon	Jenny Lewis & Hamish Cameron	29 September 2009
A multi-casualty disaster at a plastics factory tests the MRU's mettle. Mike's attempt to save a life threatens his own.
490	34	"Damned If You Do"	Pino Amenta	Martin McKenna	6 October 2009
The Medical Response Unit is called to a serious accident at a remote farm where Mike braves his own injuries to help a patient.
491	35	"The Two of Us"	Jet Wilkinson	Kim Wilson & Luke Devenish	13 October 2009
Steve's leadership abilities are put to the test and a father's decision forces Gabrielle to examine her own hypocrisy.
492	36	"Reality Check"	Di Drew	Blake Ayshford	20 October 2009
A dying father's desire to make amends with his son deeply affects both Elliott and Steve.
493	37	"Yesterday, Today and Tomorrow"	Marcus Cole	Louise Crane-Bowes	27 October 2009
In the final episode of All Saints, it's Von's last day and despite the unavoidable struggles to get through the day's patients, she is determined to leave with a win.
