= All Saints (TV series) =

Australian television medical drama

- Seasons 4–6 title card
- Genre: Medical drama
- Created by: Bevan Lee
- Developed by: Jo Porter
- Starring: (see detailed cast list in article)
- Composer: Matteo Zingales
- Country of origin: Australia
- Original language: English
- No. of seasons: 12
- No. of episodes: 493 (list of episodes)

Production
- Executive producer: John Holmes
- Producers: Jo Porter (seasons 1–4); Di Drew (seasons 5–7); Jo Porter (seasons 7–8); MaryAnne Carroll (seasons 8–10); Bill Hughes (seasons 11–12)
- Running time: 45 minutes
- Production companies: Seven Network Operations Limited; Red Heart Entertainment

Original release
- Network: Seven Network
- Release: 24 February 1998 – 27 October 2009

All Saints is an Australian medical drama television series that first screened on the Seven Network on 24 February 1998. Set in the fictional All Saints Western General Hospital, it focused on the staff of Ward 17 until the ward's closure in 2004, which is when the focus changed and began following the staff of the emergency department. The show was produced by John Holmes, alongside Jo Porter, MaryAnne Carroll, and Di Drew. The final episode aired on 27 October 2009, completing its record-breaking 12-year run.

== Plot ==
All Saints follows the lives of the staff at All Saints Western General Hospital. Until the ward's closure in 2004 (season seven), the show primarily focused on the staff in Ward 17. Known as the "garbage ward", as it took all the overflow from the other wards, Ward 17 was run by compassionate nun, Sister Terri Sullivan (Georgie Parker). Her staff included her nurses Connor Costello (Jeremy Cumpston), Von Ryan (Judith McGrath), Bronwyn Craig (Libby Tanner), Jared Levine (Ben Tari), and Stephanie Markham (Kirrily White) and her ward clerk Jaz Hillerman (Sam Healy). Luke Forlano (Martin Lynes) and Peter Morrison (Andrew McKaige) were doctors who frequently worked with Terri and her staff. Ben Markham (Brian Vriends) was an ambulance officer who worked closely with Luke, despite their rivalry. Bronwyn left Ward 17 and became an ambulance officer at the end of 1998, but returned to the ward full-time at the end of season three.

Peter and Jaz were written out early on in the second season, which introduced Doctor Mitch Stevens (Erik Thomson, an old boyfriend of Terri's with whom she had unfinished business. More of the original cast left: Stephanie was killed in a car accident in season three and Connor left in season four. The beginning of the fourth season gave Ben a new ambulance partner, Scott Zinenko (Conrad Coleby), and the concluding episodes introduced two new nurses, Paula Morgan (Jenni Baird) and Nelson Curtis (Paul Tassone). Long-serving doctor Charlotte Beaumont (Tammy Macintosh) made her debut in the fifth season.

== Cast ==
=== Main cast ===
Actor	Character	Season											
Actor	Character	1	2	3	4	5	6	7	8	9	10	11	12
Georgie Parker	Terri Sullivan	Main	Main	Main	Main	Main	Main	Main	Main				
Jeremy Cumpston	Connor Costello	Main	Main	Main	Main								
Sam Healy	Jaz Hillerman	Main	Main										
Martin Lynes	Luke Forlano	Main	Main	Main	Main	Main	Main	Main					
Judith McGrath	Von Ryan	Main	Main	Main	Main	Main	Main	Main	Main	Main	Main	Main	Main
Andrew McKaige	Peter Morrison	Main	Main										
Libby Tanner	Bronwyn Craig	Main	Main	Main	Main	Main	Main						
Ben Tari	Jared Levine	Main	Main	Main	Main	Main	Main		Guest				
Kirrily White	Stephanie Markham	Main	Main	Main	Guest								
Brian Vriends	Ben Markham	Recurring	Recurring	Main	Main	Main	Main						
Erik Thomson	Mitch Stevens		Main	Main	Main	Main	Main						
Conrad Coleby	Scott Zinenko				Main	Main	Main	Main					
Jenni Baird	Paula Morgan				Guest	Recurring	Main	Main					
Paul Tassone	Nelson Curtis				Guest	Recurring	Main	Main	Main	Main			
Tammy Macintosh	Charlotte Beaumont					Recurring	Main	Main	Main	Main	Main	Main	Main
Christopher Gabardi	Vincent Hughes						Main	Main	Main	Main	Main		
John Howard	Frank Campion							Main	Main	Main	Main	Main	Main
Wil Traval	Jack Quade							Main	Main	Main	Main	Main	
Natalie Saleeba	Jessica Singelton							Main	Main	Main			
Alexandra Davies	Cate McMasters							Main	Main	Main	Main	Guest	
Mark Priestley	Dan Goldman							Main	Main	Main	Main	Main	
Chris Vance	Sean Everleigh								Guest	Main	Main		
Andrew Supanz	Bartholomew West									Main	Main	Main	Main
Jolene Anderson	Erica Templeton									Main	Main	Main	
John Waters	Mike Vlasek									Guest	Main	Main	Main
Virginia Gay	Gabrielle Jaegar									Recurring	Main	Main	Main
Allison Cratchley	Zoe Gallagher									Main	Main	Main	
Jack Campbell	Steve Taylor										Main	Main	Main
Kip Gamblin	Adam Rossi											Main	Main
Ella Scott Lynch	Claire Anderson											Main	Main
Alix Bidstrup	Amy Fielding											Main	Main
Mirrah Foulkes	Jo Robson												Main

=== Recurring cast ===
Actor	Character	Season											
Actor	Character	1	2	3	4	5	6	7	8	9	10	11	12
Elizabeth Maywald	Sophie Williams	Recurring	Guest										
Kim Hillas	Joan Marden	Recurring	Recurring	Guest	Guest	Recurring	Recurring	Guest					Guest
Michael Angus	John Ahearn	Recurring	Recurring	Guest									
John Noble	John Madsen	Recurring	Recurring	Recurring	Guest	Guest	Recurring	Guest					
Justine Clarke	Samantha O'Hara	Recurring	Recurring										
Damon Herriman	Danny Bucknell	Recurring	Guest										
Rod Mullinar	Prof. Richard Craig	Recurring											
Robert Coleby	Prof. Richard Craig				Guest	Guest	Guest	Guest					
Jake Blundell	Tony Hurst		Recurring	Recurring	Guest								
Celia Ireland	Regina Butcher		Recurring	Recurring		Guest	Recurring	Recurring	Recurring				
Joy Smithers	Rose Carlton Stevens		Recurring	Recurring	Recurring	Recurring	Guest						
Ling-Hsueh Tang	Kylie Preece		Recurring	Recurring	Recurring	Recurring							
Kim De Lury	Mick Todd		Recurring	Recurring	Guest								
Sarah Vassallo	A&E Nurse Stella		Guest	Recurring	Recurring								
Pia Miranda	Brittany Finlay			Recurring									
Belinda Emmett	Jodi Horner			Recurring	Recurring								
Emma Jane Fowler	Vicky Dernakov				Recurring	Recurring							
Natasha Beaumont	Rebecca Green				Recurring	Recurring	Recurring						
Josh Quong Tart	Matt Horner				Recurring	Recurring	Recurring	Guest					
Rochelle Whyte	Cara Windom				Recurring	Recurring	Recurring						
Chris Haywood	Peter Buchanan					Recurring							
Rebecca Massey	Various					Guest			Guest	Guest			
Troy Planet	Dennis Poole						Guest	Recurring	Guest	Recurring			
Alan Flower	Morris the Florist						Recurring						
Rachel McNamara	Frances Regan						Recurring						
Fletcher Humphrys	Alex Kearns						Recurring	Recurring					
Henry Nixon	Sterling McCormack						Recurring	Recurring					
Liz Alexander	Alison Newell						Recurring	Recurring	Recurring	Recurring			
Anne Looby	Julia Archer						Recurring	Recurring					
Grant Bowler	Nigel "Mac" MacPherson							Recurring	Recurring				
Jaime Mears	Kerry Lytton							Recurring	Recurring	Guest			
Peter Phelps	Doug Spencer								Recurring	Recurring	Guest		
Sibylla Budd	Deanna Richardson								Recurring	Recurring			
Nicole da Silva	Sasha Fernandez								Recurring				
Panda Likoudis	Bryce the Ambo								Recurring	Guest			
Guy Edmonds	Stuart Mapleston								Recurring				
Wendy Strehlow	Lorraine Tanner								Recurring	Recurring	Recurring	Recurring	
Douglas Hansell	Aaron Roth								Recurring				
Celeste Barber	Bree Matthews								Recurring	Recurring	Recurring	Recurring	Recurring
Alexandra Fowler	Eve Ballantyne								Guest	Recurring	Recurring		
Jacinta Stapleton	Jo Henderson									Recurring			
Yael Stone	Ann-Maree Preston										Recurring	Recurring	
Mike Smith	Heath Velaga										Recurring	Recurring	Guest
Renee Lim	Suzi Lau											Recurring	Guest
Petra Yared	Rhiannon Wilson											Recurring	
Donald Sword	Crewman Paul												Recurring
Ben Wood	Troy Sanders												Recurring
Jonathan Wood	Elliott Parker												Recurring

== Production ==
After the death of Dr. Mitch Stevens (Erik Thomson) and the departure of Bron Craig (Libby Tanner) in 2003, the producers decided to do something in response to considerable drop in ratings and to prolong the life of the series.

In February 2004, John Holmes told The Age journalist Debi Enker that All Saints would be undergoing "major surgery" when the focus shifted from Ward 17 to the emergency department. He also stated that while four familiar faces will be leaving, new characters would be introduced to fill the void. Holmes recalled a statement that he made in May 2003 in which he said, "we [myself and Seven script executive Bevan Lee] were seeing the scripts and watching episodes and we were feeling that there was a little bit of a sameness in it. We started to think, 'Don't know about this. Sixth year. Maybe we've had a few too many people through the door of Ward 17 on a trolley and had the 'Hi, I'm Von, I'm your nurse. Room Three, thanks Sterlo.'" After tossing up between cancelling the show and using it as the foundation of a spin-off series, Holmes and Lee decided to rejuvenate the show by changing the setting. Ward 17 would then close and the show would be relocated to the Emergency Department.

As a result of the shift, several cast members decided to leave the show. Paula Morgan (Jenni Baird), Luke Forlano (Martin Lynes), Alex Kearns (Fletcher Humphrys), and Sterling McCormack (Henry Nixon) were all written out of the show. Former Always Greener star John Howard signed a three-year deal and was added to the cast as the cranky head of emergency, Dr. Frank Campion. Other new faces included Wil Traval as Dr. Jack Quade, Mark Priestley and Natalie Saleeba as nurses Dan Goldman and Jessica Singleton, respectively, and Alexandra Davies as ambulance officer Cate McMasters.

Season eight had one of the biggest changes yet, as Terri Sullivan (Georgie Parker), who until then had been the main character, was written out halfway through the year, leaving Von Ryan (Judith McGrath) as the last remaining original character, and resulting in John Howard being moved into top billing. The last two episodes of the season introduced Chris Vance as Doctor Sean Everleigh.

The ninth season had another large cast turnover. Nelson and Jessica both left, while arriving were Allison Cratchley as Doctor Zoe Gallagher, Andrew Supanz as intern Bartholomew West, Virginia Gay as new nurse unit manager Gabrielle Jaeger, and Jolene Anderson as nurse Erica Templeton. John Waters appeared for a run of episodes as surgeon Mike Vlasek before returning full-time the following season. Season 10 had Vincent and Cate written out, while Sean was killed off. His replacement was Steve Taylor (Jack Campbell), an old boyfriend of Gabrielle's.

The 11th season had more comings and goings as Zoe departed midseason. The latter part of the year saw Erica murdered off-screen, while the death of actor Mark Priestley resulted in Dan Goldman making his last appearance in the season's penultimate episode, in which Jack Quade also departed. As a result, the final run of episodes introduced Kip Gamblin as Doctor Adam Rossi and Ella Scott Lynch as nurse Claire Anderson. Alix Bidstrup, who had appeared for a run of episodes earlier in the year as Amy Fielding, Frank's niece and a newly qualified nurse, returned as a regular.

In 2009, in another attempt to stem the softening ratings and add a bit of excitement to the series, Seven Network executives decided to rejuvenate again, introducing a medical response unit to deal with tricky rescues, which involved a helicopter going to remote locations to rescue patients who needed assistance. They would then bring those patients back to the department and the staff there would assist in their treatments. Along with the addition of the new "department", the show was also renamed to All Saints: Medical Response Unit (MRU); the introduction of Mirrah Foulkes and the new MRU proved to lift the ratings substantially, but then levelled out at where they were prior to the revamp.

In June 2009, after months of rumours that the cancellation of All Saints was imminent, a spokeswoman from the Seven Network informed The Daily Telegraph that the episode order had been trimmed. Season 12 of All Saints would screen 24 episodes instead of the usual 40 episodes, then production would cease in August instead of November.

In July 2009, a month later after the first announcement, Tim Worner, Seven's director of programming at the time, announced that All Saints had been cancelled. He told Michael Idato of the Sydney Morning Herald, "All Saints is a show which Seven and viewers have loved. However, an audience shift and increased production costs are behind this tough decision." He also informed Idato that the episode order trim had been reverted and the season would complete a 37-episode order, finishing on episode 493. After the announcement, the introduction of the MRU in 2009 was reported to have inflated the cost of each episode to $500,000. Many people still argue as to why the MRU was introduced in the first place or should have been removed instead of axing the show if the network were wanting to cut costs.

In the Feb/Mar 2010 GQ magazine, Tim Worner said his one regret was "Axing All Saints, but it was the right call at the time, and we have two new drama projects in development."

=== Controversy ===
==== Episode 265 ====
On 20 April 2004, episode 265, "Brave New World" aired, which saw the introduction of John Howard's character, Frank Campion. It was also the first episode to be set in the emergency department. This episode attracted significant controversy.

One patient came into the triage and tried to get help, but he was told to wait. Later on, Nelson heard a phone ring coming from the patient and asked him to turn off the phone. It was later hinted that he had been using the phone to masturbate and it had gotten stuck in his rectum.

The end of the episode had Frank go introduce himself to Terri (Georgie Parker), who was recovering from heart surgery. During a heated argument about staff members, Frank blatantly said to Terri, "If you ever use your influence with your previous employees to white-ant me again, you will never work in Emergency." Before Terri could get a word in, Frank added, "Can I make it any fucking clearer?"

The next day, Channel Seven announced that they had received more than 100 phone calls in Melbourne alone. Parker told the media, "It's a good response because it's not about the shock words—we've sworn on the show before—but because people clearly feel really protective about Terri. It's like they really feel for her as a character and don't like her being under attack by a very confronting man. It's great to know they care for her so much."

On 22 April, the network issued a statement that read, "within an M classification code, coarse language is permitted provided it is appropriate to the storyline or program context." An apology was not made.

==== Episode 432 ====
On 27 May 2008, episode 432, "Never Tell" aired. This episode had a woman pregnant from an incestuous relationship with her brother, who was told her child may have Down syndrome as a result. Leading geneticist Dr. David Amor of Murdoch Children's Research Institute stated, "There is absolutely no increase in the risk of Down syndrome for the offspring of incestuous relationships."

Down Syndrome Australia considered legal action, complained to the media regulator, the Australian Communications and Media Authority, and called for a boycott by the show's advertisers if an apology and correction were not aired on All Saints the following week. Seven responded with, "All Saints values its audience and has the greatest respect for their commitment to the program. Without reservation, to any members of the audience who have found an element of a recent story offensive, Channel Seven apologises."

=== The final episode ===
The longer-than-usual 49-minute episode aired at 9:30 pm on Tuesday, 27 October 2009. The episode, unlike those in the rest of the season, went back to basics and focused more on the lives of the nurses and doctors as they tended to patients.

The episode had Judith McGrath's character, Von Ryan, tending to a teenaged girl who comes into the department and gives birth without knowing she was pregnant. Tammy Macintosh and John Howard finished their seven- and five-year reigns as Dr. Charlotte Beaumont and Dr. Frank Campion, respectively, caring for a woman played by Heather Mitchell, who had cystic fibrosis. Ella Scott Lynch and Jonathan Wood left the show on a high with their characters, Claire Anderson and Elliott Parker treating a man (Luke Pegler) with a disease consistent with diabetes and promiscuity.

Secretly, Von decides to resign from All Saints, telling only Frank that she would not be returning. He offers to take her out for dinner, but instead plans a surprise farewell dinner for her. Throughout the dinner, Gabrielle (Virginia Gay) and Steve (Jack Campbell) decide to raise their child together and get back together, Bart (Andrew Supanz) proposes to his girlfriend Amy (Alix Bidstrup), and Charlotte and Adam (Kip Gamblin) share an intense moment.

At the table, Von is pressured to make a speech by her colleagues and friends, and reluctantly she does, uttering her famous line: "I spent a lot of time at All Saints and I'd just like to thank you all for your loyalty, your support, and love. Oh, bugger this, here's to us." She raises her glass and toasts.

The finale is capped off by a montage of scenes from over the show's 12-year run, including Mitch's final scene, the closure of Ward 17 and Bron and Ben's wedding, all to The Beatles song, "In My Life". The final scene has Frank raise his glass at Von, who raises hers and smiles.

=== Opening credits ===
The first opening theme song for All Saints began with several deep breaths and then went into a tune played by a saxophone. The melody bears a striking similarity to "Fly by Night", the first track on Jethro Tull frontman Ian Anderson's 1983 debut album Walk into Light. This played over the top of several shots of the cast members. Actors' names were in the font Zurich Extra Condensed and underlined. Intercut were shots of hands, various medical equipment, and medicine.

The second opening theme song was first used when the opening was upgraded in the middle of season two. The same song was used, but drums were added to give it more of an authentic sound. The shots of cast changed, and names of actors and their characters were now present. The font remained the same. Shots of hands, medical vehicles, and equipment were also present.

The first major overhaul of the opening happened in season four, when the titles were completely changed. They now began with several deep breaths over a blue screen with a vision of hands in the background. The screen was set up with a slide of the actor in the centre, with deep blue all around, and medical notation. The theme was more stringy and only involved a small saxophone part. Medical crosses, bottles, and syringes were present in the opening. This coincided with the change from the standard TV 4:3 aspect ratio to widescreen 16:9.

The second major overhaul of the opening happened in season seven, when the whole layout and font used were completely changed to mark the revamp of the show and its change of focus to the emergency department. The basic undertone of the theme was still there, but another saxophone overtone was added to give the theme more authenticity. The images were also upgraded to include ambulances, surgical equipment, and people rushing around in the background. The font changed and actors and characters were now in the font Imprint MT Shadow. This set of opening titles continued until the end of season eight.

At the beginning of season nine, the opening titles credits were ditched, and the main cast were listed at the last of every episode with the names returning to their original format and font. This continued until the final episode. In seasons 10 and 11, the actor's names and their corresponding character names flew in from either side; this idea was dumped, though, when the show returned for its final season. An intertitle card appeared before every ad break in season 9, but the show returned to fading out in the 10th and 11th seasons. At the beginning of the 11th season, a new title card premiered, and then appeared at the start of every episode. This title card was refurbished for the 12th and final season to coincide with the change of name. This title card saw the show out.

== Reception ==
=== Awards and nominations ===
The show has been nominated for 56 Logie awards and won 9.

Year	Nominee	Award	Result
1999	Georgie Parker	Most Popular Personality on Australian Television	Nominated
1999	Georgie Parker	Most Popular Actress	Nominated
1999	All Saints	Most Popular Program	Nominated
1999	Libby Tanner	Most Popular New Female Talent	Nominated
2000	Georgie Parker	Most Popular Personality on Australian Television	Nominated
2000	Georgie Parker	Most Popular Actress	Nominated
2000	All Saints	Most Popular Program	Nominated
2000	All Saints	Most Outstanding Program	Nominated
2001	Georgie Parker	Most Popular Personality on Australian Television	Won
2001	Georgie Parker	Most Popular Actress	Won
2001	All Saints	Most Popular Program	Won
2001	Georgie Parker	Most Outstanding Actress	Nominated
2001	Libby Tanner	Most Outstanding Actress	Nominated
2001	All Saints	Most Outstanding Program	Nominated
2002	Georgie Parker	Most Popular Personality on Australian Television	Won
2002	Libby Tanner	Most Popular Personality on Australian Television	Nominated
2002	Georgie Parker	Most Popular Actress	Nominated
2002	Libby Tanner	Most Popular Actress	Won
2002	Erik Thomson	Most Popular Actor	Nominated
2002	Georgie Parker	Most Outstanding Actress	Nominated
2002	Libby Tanner	Most Outstanding Actress	Nominated
2002	Conrad Coleby	Most Popular New Male Talent	Nominated
2002	All Saints	Most Popular Program	Won
2002	All Saints	Most Outstanding Drama Series	Nominated
2003	Georgie Parker	Most Popular Personality on Australian Television	Nominated
2003	Libby Tanner	Most Popular Personality on Australian Television	Nominated
2003	Georgie Parker	Most Popular Actress	Nominated
2003	Libby Tanner	Most Popular Actress	Won
2003	Erik Thomson	Most Popular Actor	Won
2003	All Saints	Most Popular Australian Program	Won
2003	All Saints	Most Outstanding Drama Series	Nominated
2004	Georgie Parker	Most Popular Personality on Australian Television	Nominated
2004	Erik Thomson	Most Popular Actor	Nominated
2004	All Saints	Most Popular Australian Program	Nominated
2004	All Saints	Most Popular Australian Drama Series	Nominated
2004	All Saints	Most Outstanding Drama Series	Nominated
2005	Georgie Parker	Most Popular Personality on Australian Television	Nominated
2005	Wil Traval	Most Popular New Male Talent	Nominated
2005	Natalie Saleeba	Most Popular New Female Talent	Nominated
2005	All Saints	Most Popular Australian Drama Series	Nominated
2006	John Howard	Most Outstanding Actor	Nominated
2006	All Saints	Most Popular Australian Drama Series	Nominated
2006	All Saints	Most Outstanding Drama Series	Nominated
2007	John Howard	Most Popular Personality on Australian Television	Nominated
2007	John Howard	Most Popular Actor	Nominated
2007	Judith McGrath	Most Outstanding Actress in a Series	Nominated
2007	Andrew Supanz	Most Popular New Male Talent	Nominated
2007	Jolene Anderson	Most Popular New Female Talent	Nominated
2007	All Saints	Most Popular Australian Drama Series	Nominated
2008	John Howard	Most Popular Personality on Australian Television	Nominated
2008	John Howard	Most Popular Actor	Nominated
2008	Jack Campbell	Most Popular New Male Talent	Nominated
2008	All Saints	Most Popular Australian Drama Series	Nominated
2009	Mark Priestley	Most Popular Actor	Nominated
2010	Mirrah Foulkes	Most Popular New Female Talent	Nominated
2010	All Saints: Medical Response Unit	Most Popular Australian Drama Series	Nominated

=== Australian Film Institute (AFI) Awards ===
All Saints has won two AFI Awards from the Australian Film Institute and has been nominated for various others.

Year	Nominee	Award	Result
1998	Ep. 6: Give and Take	Best Episode in a Television Drama Series	Nominated
1998	Ep. 20: Revelations	Best Episode in a Television Drama Series	Nominated
1999	Ep. 58: Head to Head	Best Episode in a Television Drama Series	Won
2000	Valley of the Shadow	Best Episode in a Television Drama Series	Won
2000	Dead on Time	Best Episode in a Television Drama Series	Nominated
2002	All Saints	Best Television Drama Series	Nominated
2002	Peter Fisk (ep. 169: Opening Night)	Best Direction in a Television Drama	Nominated
2002	Belinda McClory (ep. 169: Opening Night)	Best Guest or Supporting Actress in Television Drama	Nominated
2005	All Saints	Best Television Drama Series	Nominated
2006	All Saints	Best Television Drama Series	Nominated
2006	John Waters	Best Guest or Supporting Actor in Television Drama	Nominated
2007	All Saints	Best Television Drama Series	Nominated
2007	Mark Priestley	Best Guest or Supporting Actor in Television Drama	Nominated

=== Ratings ===
Season	# of Episodes	Timeslot	Season Premiere	Season Final	Peak Audience	Average Audience	Rank (Australian series)
1	41	Tuesday 8:30 pm	24 February 1998	17 November 1998	—N/a	1,381,000	5th
2	43	Tuesday 8:30 pm	8 February 1999	23 November 1999	—N/a	1,435,000	5th
3	41	Tuesday 8:30 pm	8 February 2000	21 November 2000	—N/a	1,488,000	3rd
4	43	Tuesday 8:30 pm	13 February 2001	27 November 2001	2,023,000	1,595,000	3rd
5	43	Tuesday 8:30 pm	5 February 2002	26 November 2002	1,687,000	1,507,000	3rd
6	43	Tuesday 8:30 pm	11 February 2003	25 November 2003	1,544,000	1,363,000	4th
7	40	Tuesday 8:30 pm	27 February 2004	16 November 2004	1,424,000	1,235,000	4th
8	41	Tuesday 8:30 pm	8 February 2005	22 November 2005	1,559,000	1,282,000	3rd
9	40	Tuesday 8:30 pm	28 February 2006	21 November 2006	1,660,000	1,419,000	2nd
10	41	Tuesday 8:30 pm	13 February 2007	20 November 2007	1,603,000	1,380,000	2nd
11	40	Tuesday 9:30 pm	12 February 2008	25 November 2008	1,603,000	1,245,000	2nd
12	37	Tuesday 9:30 pm	3 February 2009	27 October 2009	1,505,000	1,175,000	3rd

== Home media ==
Seasons 1 to 5 were released by EMI Australia in 2005 through 2007. EMI lost the DVD rights in 2007, therefore seasons 1 to 5 were discontinued.

Universal Sony Pictures Home Entertainment Australia were later awarded DVD rights to the show, releasing seasons 8 to 12 in 2009 and 2010. The two "missing seasons" - seasons 6 and 7 - were released on 2 March 2011. All 12 seasons are being re-released on DVD in Australia in 2018/2019 by Via Vision Entertainment and Madman Entertainment with the first 3 seasons being released as "All Saints Collection One" and available from September 2018. With "All Saints Collection Two" to follow in November 2018.

== DVD Releases ==
DVD Season	Format	# Episodes	# Disc(s)	Region 4	DVD Distributors
The Complete First Season	DVD	41	10	28 November 2005	EMI
The Complete Second Season	DVD	43	11	20 June 2006	EMI
The Complete Third Season	DVD	41	10	17 November 2006	EMI
The Complete Fourth Season	DVD	43	10	27 November 2006	EMI
The Complete Fifth Season	DVD	43	10	13 September 2007	EMI
2003 Season	DVD	43	11	2 March 2011	Universal Sony Pictures Home Entertainment Australia
2004 Season	DVD	40	10	2 March 2011	Universal Sony Pictures Home Entertainment Australia
2005 Season	DVD	41	11	29 September 2010	Universal Sony Pictures Home Entertainment Australia
2006 Season	DVD	40	10	29 September 2010	Universal Sony Pictures Home Entertainment Australia
2007 Season	DVD	41	10	9 September 2010	Universal Sony Pictures Home Entertainment Australia
2008 Season	DVD	40	10	9 September 2010	Universal Sony Pictures Home Entertainment Australia
2009 Season	DVD	37	9	2 March 2010	Universal Sony Pictures Home Entertainment Australia
All Saints Collection One (seasons 1–3)	DVD	125	31	19 September 2018	Via Vision Entertainment
All Saints Collection Two (seasons 4–6)	DVD	128	31	1 November 2018	Via Vision Entertainment
All Saints Collection Three (seasons 7–9)	DVD	121	31	5 December 2018	Via Vision Entertainment
All Saints Collection Four (seasons 10–12)	DVD	118	29	6 March 2019	Via Vision Entertainment
All Saints Complete Collection (seasons 1–12)	DVD	493	122	13 September 2023	Via Vision Entertainment
