= Nici Cumpston =

Australian artist, curator, writer and educator

Nici Cumpston OAM
- Born: Nicole Jane Cumpston; 1963 (age 62–63); Adelaide, South Australia
- Education: University of South Australia
- Known for: Photography, visual arts, Indigenous art curation
- Relatives: Jeremy Cumpston (brother)

Nicole Jane "Nici" Cumpston OAM is an Australian art photographer, painter, curator, writer, and educator. After being appointed inaugural curator of Aboriginal and Torres Strait Islander art at the Art Gallery of South Australia (AGSA) in 2008, she became founding artistic director of Tarnanthi, the Aboriginal and Torres Strait Islander arts festival held in Adelaide in 2014, while retaining her position at AGSA. In May 2025 she will take up her appointment as director of the Kluge-Ruhe Aboriginal Art Collection in Charlottesville, Virginia, United States.

== Early life and education ==
Nicole Jane Cumpston was born in Adelaide in 1963. Her family background is Barkindji (an Aboriginal people of New South Wales) and Afghan on her mother's side, and Irish and English on her father's. Her father, Trevor, was a radiographer, and the family moved first to Darwin and then to Alice Springs in the early 1960s, as there was an outbreak of tuberculosis and X-rays were needed in regional communities all over the Northern Territory (NT).

Her younger brother, actor and doctor Jeremy Cumpston, was born in Darwin, before the family moved to a tiny French village called Notre-Dame-de-Lourdes in Manitoba, Canada, so that her father could take up an opportunity to study hospital administration. They lived in different towns in Canada for around nine years, and Nici quickly picked up Canadian French and learnt to ice skate. After returning to Australia, the family returned to Canada for Trevor to study further, as Australia did not recognise his qualification. Returning to Australia when Nici was 13, they lived in the Riverland in South Australia and she attended Glossop High School. She attended 17 schools in total. She has three younger sisters.

== Early career and further education ==
After leaving school, Cumpston first trained as an enrolled nurse through the Loxton District Hospital and then worked at the Royal Adelaide Hospital.

In 1984 she moved to the NT and worked in a variety of tourist jobs at Uluru, where she made friends with people in the Mutitjulu community. She then moved to work in Alice Springs, did a course in black and white photography, and travelled around NT and Queensland taking photographs. Her mother encouraged her to go to art school so she enrolled in the North Adelaide School of Arts. She attended the school from 1987 to 1989 and received a Diploma of Applied and Visual Art, majoring in Photography. She then worked for six years for South Australia Police printing images from the crime scene and accident investigations, to be used in court.

In 1996 Cumpton was appointed lecturer in photography and coordinator of the art department at Tauondi Aboriginal Community College in Port Adelaide, and it was during her time there that she studied for a Bachelor of Visual Arts (Honours) at the University of South Australia (UniSA) graduating in 2004.

In 2006 she was appointed course coordinator for the newly established course in Indigenous arts, culture and design, and also photography lecturer, at the South Australian School of Art at UniSA.

== Career as curator ==
Cumpston became inaugural curator of Aboriginal and Torres Strait Islander art at the Art Gallery of South Australia (AGSA), first as a trainee, in 2008. In 2010 she was given the opportunity to curate an exhibition called Desert Country, which was exhibited first at AGSA and then around the country.

She was appointed founding artistic director of Tarnanthi, the biennial Aboriginal and Torres Strait Islander arts festival held in Adelaide, in 2014. Tarnanthi exhibitions are held at the South Australian Museum as well as other venues such as the JamFactory and the South Australian School of Art.

In January 2025 it was announced that Cumpston would be leaving AGSA to take up a new appointment as director of the University of Virginia's Kluge-Ruhe Aboriginal Art Collection in Charlottesville in the US. She begins her role in May 2025. Although moving to the US in March, Cumpston will oversee Tarnanthi in 2025 festival, celebrates its 10th anniversary in October.

== Photography ==
Cumpston built up her practice as an art photographer, shooting on black-and-white film, which is then scanned and printed digitally on canvas before being hand-coloured with either watercolour, oil paint, crayons, or pencils. Much of her work features the rivers of the Murray–Darling basin. Her work was influenced by Kate Breakey, a South Australian photographer whom she met at art school, who has done most of her work in the US for 30 years. She has been exhibiting her work since the 1990s. In the early 2000s, Breakey was invited by the Helpmann Academy and UniSA for a residency, and Cumpston invited to be a mentee.

An exhibition of her work, having-been-there, was held at Kluge-Ruhe in 2014, during which Cumpston spent two months as resident artist.

Cumpston and her sister Zena both co-curated and contributed works to ngaratya (together us group, all in it together), an exhibition of six Barkindji artists commissioned by Bunjil Place Gallery in October 2025.

=== Works ===
- National Gallery of Victoria, Melbourne:
  - Flooded Gum, Katarapko Creek, Murray River National Park, 2007
  - Nookamka – Lake Bonney
  - Tree stumps, western shoreline – Nookamka
- National Gallery of Australia, Canberra:
  - Campsite V, Nookamka Lake
- Shepparton Art Museum, Victoria:
  - Wooroo (mouth) Rock Well

== Other activities ==
In April 2024, Cumpston served on the jury for the A$60 million revitalisation of the National Gallery of Australia's three-hectare sculpture garden, alongside Philip Goad, Nick Mitzevich, and Teresa Moller.

She is also an educator of, and advocate for, Aboriginal people.

== Recognition ==
In 2013, Cumpston was awarded the Premier of South Australia's NAIDOC Award.

In 2019, she was awarded the Stevie Gadlabarti Goldsmith Memorial Award by the SA Government.

In the 2020 Queen's Birthday Honours, Cumpston was awarded the Medal of the Order of Australia (OAM) for "service to the museums and galleries sector, and to Indigenous art". She had been nominated by elders from Aṉangu Pitjantjatjara Yankunytjatjara Lands.

Upon the announcement of her departure from AGSA in January 2025, the gallery listed her many achievements, including the growth of its Aboriginal and Torres Strait Islander art collection grew by more than 1,000 works under her 17-year leadership, and many major exhibitions. She was also praised by Minister for the Arts Andrea Michaels.

== Personal life ==
As of 2020 Cumpston has a partner called Jon, a surveyor, who was her best friend's brother when she was nursing, but they only got together around 2006.
