= Morley Senior High School =

School in Noranda, Western Australia

Location
- Noranda, Perth, Western Australia; Australia; 31°52′22″S 115°53′01″E

Information
- Type: Public co-educational high day school
- Motto: Together We Achieve
- Established: 1971; 55 years ago
- Educational authority: WA Department of Education
- Principal: Rosalba Butterworth
- Years: 7–12
- Enrolment: 1,475
- Campus type: Suburban
- Colours: Blue, white, red
- Website: morleyshs.wa.edu.au

Morley Senior High School is an Independent Public high school located in Noranda, a northern suburb of Perth, Western Australia. The school provides an education to approximately 1,400 students from Year 7 to Year 12.

== History ==
By the end of the 1960s, John Forrest Senior High School and Hampton Senior High School were desperately overcrowded. Morley High School was established in 1970, but without a campus of its own. At first, the school consisted of 9 demountable classrooms and 250 students on the grounds of John Forrest Senior High School. It had its own staff, principal and p&c association, but it used John Forrest's library, sports facilities and canteen. A campus of its own opened in 1972 to 830 students from the first 3 years. By 1975, Morley was a complete Senior High School.

In 2015, Morley Senior High School became an Independent Public School.

== Notable alumni ==
- Tom Jervis, basketball player
- Tammy MacIntosh, actress
- Adrian Majstrovich, basketball player
- Andrew Supanz, actor
- Jeremy Fernandez, news presenter

== See also ==
- List of schools in the Perth metropolitan area
