= Alix Bidstrup =

Australian actress

Alix Bidstrup (born in Toowoomba, Queensland, Australia) is an Australian actress best known for her role as nurse Amy Fielding on All Saints. She has guest-starred on Sea Patrol and Tricky Business, and has also pursued a singing career.

== Personal life ==
Bidstrup was raised on a farm outside of Jandowae, a remote southeast Queensland town with a population of 800. She graduated from the University of Southern Queensland upon completing a Bachelor of Theatre Arts (Acting) in 2008. Bidstrup made her television debut on 5 August 2008 on All Saints. She currently resides in Ontario, Canada.
