= Kirrily White =

Australian actress

Kirrily White is an Australian actress.

== Early life ==
Born and raised in Sydney, White was involved in school plays and concerts at a young age, while also studying ballet, piano and drama. White aspired to have an acting career and, when she was 14, along with 70 other teenagers, she wrote and performed a play called Winds of the Solstice at the Sydney Opera House. After completing high school, White began an arts degree at Sydney University, studying English, Linguistics, Philosophy and Australian Literature, but focusing on drama. In 1994, White moved to Perth to focus on her acting career.

== Acting career ==
=== Television ===
White began her television acting career with a guest role on Murder Call in 1997 and had another small role in Children's Hospital in the same year. She also had a one episode role in Murder Call. In 1998 she joined the cast of Australian hospital drama All Saints playing nurse Stephanie Markham. After 106 episodes she left the series in 2000. White had a one episode role in White Collar Blue. In 2003, White had a guest role in the third season of The Secret Life of Us in the episode, "Playing With Fire".

=== Theatre ===
In 1997, White appeared in a Sydney Theatre Company of Mongrels. She also appeared in another STC production in the same year, Private Lives. White appeared in the theatre production A Moment on the Lips in 2003 that played at the Old Fitzroy Hotel Theatre.

In 2005 she appeared in The Department Store.

== Filmography ==
Title	Year	Role	Notes
Murder Call	1997	Lucy Balzan	Episode: "Dead and Gone"
Children’s Hospital	1998	Erica Loren	Episode: "Past Imperfect"
All Saints	1998-2001	Stephanie Markham	Main cast (108 episodes)
Young Lions	2002	Lorraine Menzies	Episode: "Nursing Home"
White Collar Blue	2003	Bridie Heron	Episode: "1.18"
The Secret Life of Us	2003	Joanna Templeton	Episode: “Playing with Fire”

== Behavioural therapy ==
White formerly worked as a behavioural therapist for The L.E.A.R.N. Foundation, an organisation that works with children with autism.
