= Jeremy Cumpston =

Australian actor and doctor

- Born: c. 1967; Darwin, Northern Territory, Australia
- Occupations: Doctor, actor, director
- Years active: 1992−present
- Partner(s): Rachel Lane (1999−?); Jessica Brentnall (2005−2010)
- Children: 4, including Hal and Joseph
- Relatives: Nici Cumpston (sister)

Jeremy Cumpston (born c. 1967) is an Australian doctor, actor and director, best known for his work as Connor Costello in Australian hospital drama All Saints (1998 to 2001).

== Early life and education ==
Jeremy Cumpston was born around 1967 in Darwin, Australia, to Noelene and Trevor Cumpston. Noelene's mother was Afghan-Aboriginal of Barkandji heritage, and her father was a white Australian. Cumpston's grandfather was head doctor of the New Broken Hill Mines. Trevor was a radiographer based in Darwin working on a program to provide X-ray screenings for tuberculosis in remote Aboriginal communities when Jeremy was born, three and a half years after his sister art photographer and curator Nici Cumpston.

The family moved to Canada, where Cumpston's father was the hospital administrator for a small town. When Jeremy was eight they briefly returned to Australia but then went back to Canada, and this time his father worked at the hospital base for the world's second largest nickel mine, in Thompson, Manitoba, located north of the 55th parallel.

At age 11, Cumpston and his parents and four sisters returned to live in South Australia. At the end of Year 12 he decided to study medicine, despite his love of drama. While Cumpston pursued his medical career, he was still interested in acting, so auditioned and was accepted into the Victorian College of the Arts (VCA). He couldn't defer his intern year so he had to pass up the place.

After completing his internship at Wollongong Hospital and Sydney's Prince Henry Hospital, Cumpston enrolled in classes at the Actors Centre Australia, where his classmates included Hugh Jackman and Jason Clarke.

He worked as general practitioner for some time before heading off to Perth for three years' full-time acting study at the Western Australian Academy of Performing Arts (WAAPA).

== Career ==
Whilst in his final year at WAAPA in 1995, Cumpston worked as a GP full-time for six weeks during his holidays to save money, which enabled him to produce and then perform in the one-man play Shadow Boxing. He performed in Adelaide and had a return season in Perth. This was the first play produced by the Tamarama Rock Surfers theatre company, which he co-founded with Michael Gwynne and his sister Zena Cumpston in 1994.

After graduation, Cumpston obtained an agent. This led to a role with the Sydney Theatre Company's 1996 production of the musical Miracle City, directed by Gale Edwards. Next came the lead in the New England Theatre Company's production of Romeo and Juliet and then the role of Mercutio in the Glenn Elston production of Romeo and Juliet in the Sydney Botanic Gardens.

Cumpston founded the Old Fitzroy Theatre in 1997 with the other members of the Tamarama Rock Surfers. The group continued until 2015.

In 1997, Cumpston took a role at an Aboriginal medical centre in Sydney's western suburbs while continuing to audition and work on guest roles in Murder Call and Roar. The Tamarama Rock Surfers' first Sydney project, Road, directed by Simon Lyndon, was produced by Cumpston and he performed in it. He then directed Three Strikes at the Old Fitzroy Hotel, which had a sellout season.

From 1998 to 2001, Cumpston played the "lovable rogue" nurse Connor Costello in the Australian medical drama All Saints. During his time on the show, Cumpston kept up his real medical career by writing a medical column in a weekly magazine and working in a clinic on Saturdays.

In 1998, Cumpston directed Pitchfork and co-produced Diary of a Madman. In 1999 he is directed and starring in Amco Riders at the Old Fitzroy Hotel in Sydney.

Cumpston directed short films Free in 2003, The Sky is Always Beautiful in 2007 and The Last Race in 2011.

Cumpston directed the movie Bilched, written by his son Hal Cumpston. The film was shot in 2019 and received a national release in Australia. At the 2019 Chelsea Film Festival it won the award for Best Screenplay, Best Supporting Actor (Frederick Du Rietz), and the Grand Prix Best Feature Film.

In his medical career, Cumpston ran a series of cosmetic clinics, Ageless Clinics, across New South Wales. In 2020 his license to practice expired and he was called on by AHPRA to provide proof of proper professional indemnity insurance coverage to the Medical Board of Australia.

In 2024, Cumpston appeared in season 3 of Total Control.

== Personal life ==
During his time in All Saints, Cumpston worked with his then partner, props buyer and later producer, Rachel Lane, who is the mother of his eldest son Hal, born in 1999.

From 2005 to 2010, Cumpston was married to film producer Jessica Brentnall; with her he had two sons and a daughter, including son Joseph Zada, who also works as an actor.

== Filmography ==
=== Film ===
Year	Title	Role	Notes
2022	Maddie's Red Hot	Robert	Short
2020	Stuntbot	Talk Show Host	Short
2019	Bilched	Dr. David	
2017	What If It Works?	Stan	(voice)
2016	Petunia	Jack	Short
2015	Last Cab to Darwin	Dr. Sharpe	
2004	Get Rich Quick	Tucker	
1998	Masseur	Masseur	Short
1998	They	Guy in Office	Short
1992	Hidden Injuries	Gang Member	Short

=== Television ===
Year	Title	Role	Notes
2024	Total Control	Dr Carrera	1 episode
2004	The Mystery of Natalie Wood	John Payne	Mini Series
1998-2001	All Saints	Connor Costello	158 episode
1997	Murder Call	Adrian McCaffery	1 episode
1997	Roar	Aiden	1 episode
