= Brian Vriends =

Australian actor

Brian Vriends is an Australian stage and television actor who is best known for playing Ben Markham in All Saints.

== Career ==
Vriends has appeared in many Australian television shows, he appeared as Ben in long running medical drama All Saints. Vriends appeared in Neighbours. In 2020, Vriends was announced to appear in prison drama Wentworth in the role of Dr. Mendel.

== Personal life ==
Vriends was previously married to All Saints co-star Libby Tanner.

== Filmography ==
=== Television appearances ===
Year	Title	Role	Note
2020	Wentworth	Dr. Mendel	3 episodes
2020	Halifax: Retribution	Cameron Kelleher	1 episode
2014	Fat Tony & Co.	Malcolm	2 episodes
2010-11	Neighbours	Leigh Nixon	26 episodes
2010	Rush	Chris Finch	1 episode
2008	City Homicide	Justin Kaplan	1 episode
2008	Very Small Business	Jerome	1 episode
2008	The Hollowmen	John Badwin	1 episode
2008	Underbelly	Dave Carpenter	3 episodes
2004	Through My Eyes	Detective Chief Neil Plum	2 episodes
2004	Firefiles	Sam O'Donnell	1 episode
2003	Stingers	Joel Pearson	1 episode
1998-03	All Saints	Ben Markham	204 episodes
2000	Tales of the South Seas	Jack McGonnigal	4 episodes
1997	Fallen Angels	Nick Swan	20 episodes
1996	The Feds: Deadfall	Michael Skinner	TV movie
1996	The Feds:Betrayal	Michael Skinner	TV movie
1996-97	Pacific Drive	Julian Flood	TV series
1995	Echo Point	Patrick	6 episodes
1995	The Feds: Vengeance	Michael Skinner	TV movie
1995	The Feds: Terror	Michael Skinner	TV movie
1995	The Feds: Abduction	Michael Skinner	TV movie
1995	The Feds: Deception	Michael Skinner	TV movie
1995	The Feds: Suspects	Michael Skinner	TV movie
1994	The Feds:Obsession	Michael Skinner	TV movie
1993-94	Time Trax	Longo / Stacy	2 episodes
1992	Mission: Top Secret	Garth	TV movie
1991	The Flying Doctors	Scott	1 episode
1991	Police Rescue	Tybalt	1 episode
1991	A Country Practice	Will Forster	1 episode
1990	Rafferty's Rules	Lance	1 episode
1989	Grim Pickings	Damien	2 episodes

=== Film appearances ===
Year	Title	Role	Notes	Ref
2008	Playing for Charlie	Col Ward		
1994	Spider and Rose	Spider's mate		
1993	God's Bones		Short	
1990	Weekend With Kate	Control Room Assistant		
1990	Struck By Lightning	Pat		
1989	Mortgage	Dave		

== Theatre ==
Year	Title	Role	Notes	Ref
2026	Twelve Angry Actors	Writer	Asamina Theatre Company	
2011	Hamlet	Osric	MTC	
1994	King Lear		Drama Theatre	
1991	Racine 1677	Hippolytus		
