= Andrew Supanz =

Australian actor (born 1982)

- Born: 1982 (age 43–44); Perth, Western Australia,
- Citizenship: Australia
- Education: Morley Senior High School
- Alma mater: Curtin University; National Institute of Dramatic Art
- Occupation: Actor
- Website: IMDb

Andrew Supanz (born 1982) is an Australian actor. He is best known for playing Dr. Bartholomew "Bart" West (often referred to as Homer by other doctors on the show) on the series All Saints from 2006 until the final episode in 2009.

Supanz grew up in Noranda, Western Australia and attended Morley Senior High School. After completion of grade 12, he went on to graduate from Curtin University of Technology in 2003 with a double major in acting and creative writing. After graduating, Supanz was accepted into the National Institute of Dramatic Art and moved to Sydney. After completing the NIDA course in November 2005, Supanz landed his first role as Dr Bart West in All Saints. In 2007, he was nominated for a Logie Award for Most Popular New Talent (Male).

He also starred in a television commercial advertising Libra tampons.
