= 2002 Australian Film Institute Awards =

Annual film award

44th Australian Film Institute Awards
- Date: 7 December 2002
- Site: Princess Theatre, Melbourne

Highlights
- Best Film: Rabbit-Proof Fence
- Best Direction: Ivan Sen; Beneath Clouds
- Best Actor: David Gulpilil; The Tracker
- Best Actress: Maria Theodorakis; Walking on Water
- Supporting Actor: Nathaniel Dean; Walking on Water
- Supporting Actress: Judi Farr; Walking on Water
- Most awards: Feature film: Walking on Water (5)
- Most nominations: Feature film: Rabbit-Proof Fence (10); Television: The Secret Life of Us (5)

Television coverage
- Network: Network Ten

The 44th Australian Film Institute Awards (generally known as the 2002 AFI Awards), were a series of awards presented by the Australian Film Institute (AFI). The awards celebrated the best in Australian feature film, television, documentary and short film productions of 2002. The ceremony took place at The Princess Theatre, Melbourne and was televised by Network Ten.

== Winners and nominees ==
The nominations were announced on 19 October 2002. Leading the feature film nominees was Rabbit-Proof Fence with a total of ten nominations. All four of the Best Film nominees featured Indigenous subjects. The Secret Life of Us, Network Ten's drama about a group of friends who live in a St Kilda, gained the most television nominations with five.

Tony Ayres' directorial debut, Walking on Water, exploring the grief, tenderness, stupidity and humour that arises from death, received five awards, the most for any production. In the television category, the small-screen movie The Road From Coorain, an adaptation of Jill Ker Conway's memoir of the same name, won four awards.

== Controversies ==
The decision to allow the unreleased drama Swimming Upstream to receive five award nominations was met with great dismay by other entrants. The distributors of all four nominees for best film were quoted as being "angry" and "disappointed" that the nominations include a film without a cinema release by the cut-off date of 26 September 2002. Another film, Garage Days, also received three nominations despite being released a week after the deadline.

Winners are listed first and highlighted in boldface.

=== Feature film ===
Best Film	Best Direction
**Rabbit-Proof Fence** **– Phillip Noyce, Christine Olsen and John Winter**; Australian Rules – Mark Lazarus; Beneath Clouds – Teresa-Jayne Hanlon; The Tracker – Rolf de Heer and Julie Ryan	**Ivan Sen – Beneath Clouds**; Phillip Noyce – Rabbit-Proof Fence; Rolf de Heer – The Tracker; Tony Ayres – Walking on Water
Best Performance by an Actor in a Leading Role	Best Performance by an Actress in a Leading Role
**David Gulpilil – The Tracker**; David Wenham – Molokai: The Story of Father Damien; Geoffrey Rush – Swimming Upstream; Vince Colosimo – Walking on Water	**Maria Theodorakis – Walking on Water**; Dannielle Hall – Beneath Clouds; Judy Davis – Swimming Upstream; Rachel Griffiths – The Hard Word
Best Performance by an Actor in a Supporting Role	Best Performance by an Actress in a Supporting Role
**Nathaniel Dean – Walking on Water**; Luke Carroll – Australian Rules; David Gulpilil – Rabbit-Proof Fence; Joel Edgerton – The Hard Word	**Judi Farr – Walking on Water**; Celia Ireland – Australian Rules; Anna Lise Phillips – Envy; Maya Stange – Garage Days
Best Original Screenplay	Best Adapted Screenplay
**Roger Monk – Walking on Water**; Ivan Sen – Beneath Clouds; Don Watson – The Man Who Sued God; Rolf de Heer – The Tracker	**Phillip Gwynne and Paul Goldman – Australian Rules**; John Briley – Molokai: The Story of Father Damien; Christine Olsen – Rabbit-Proof Fence; Anthony Fingleton – Swimming Upstream
Best Cinematography	Best Editing
**Allan Collins – Beneath Clouds**; Geoffrey Hall – Dirty Deeds; Christopher Doyle – Rabbit-Proof Fence; Ian Jones – The Tracker	**Reva Childs – Walking on Water**; Mark Perry – Dirty Deeds; Veronika Jenet and John Scott – Rabbit-Proof Fence; Tania Nehme – The Tracker
Best Original Music Score	Best Sound
**Peter Gabriel – Rabbit-Proof Fence**; Mick Harvey – Australian Rules; Alister Spence and Ivan Sen – Beneath Clouds; Antony Partos – Walking on Water	**Bronwyn Murphy, Craig Carter, Ian McLoughlin and John Penders – Rabbit-Proof Fence**; Phil Judd, Julius Chan, Ross Boyer and Jenny T. Ward – Australian Rules; Peter Grace, Tony Vaccher, Phil Winters and Simon Leadley – Garage Days; Liam Egan, Robert Sullivan, Delia McCarthy and Jenny T. Ward – Walking on Water
Best Production Design	Best Costume Design
**Chris Kennedy – Dirty Deeds**; Michael Philips – Garage Days; Roger Ford – Rabbit-Proof Fence; Roger Ford – Swimming Upstream	**Tess Schofield – Dirty Deeds**; Roger Ford – Rabbit-Proof Fence; Angus Strathie – Swimming Upstream; George Liddle – WillFull

=== Television ===
Best Drama Series	Best Telefeature or Mini Series
**Kath & Kim (ABC) – Mark Ruse**; All Saints: Series 5 (Seven Network) – Di Drew; MDA (ABC) – Riccardo Pellizzeri and Greg Haddrick; The Secret Life of Us (Network Ten) – Amanda Higgs and John Edwards	**The Road From Coorain (ABC) – Penny Chapman**; Halifax f.p.: Series 6, Episode 3 "Takes Two" (Nine Network) – Roger Le Mesurier, Roger Simpson and Steve Jodrell; Heroes' Mountain (Network Ten) – Anthony Buckley; Secret Bridesmaids' Business (ABC) – Lynda House
Best Lead Actor	Best Lead Actress
**Joel Edgerton – The Secret Life of Us (Network Ten)**; Shane Bourne – MDA (ABC); Peter O'Brien – White Collar Blue (Network Ten); Tom Long – Young Lions (Nine Network)	**Juliet Stevenson – The Road From Coorain (ABC)**; Mary Docker – Halifax f.p.: Series 6, Episode 3 "Takes Two" (Nine Network); Kerry Armstrong – MDA (ABC); Claudia Karvan – The Secret Life of Us (Network Ten)
Best Guest or Supporting Actor	Best Guest or Supporting Actress
**Clayton Watson – Always Greener: Series 2 (Seven Network)**; Gary Waddell – Bad Cop, Bad Cop: Episode 8 "Yesterday's Zero" (ABC); Tom Long – Heroes' Mountain (Network Ten); Angus Grant – MDA: Episode 7 "When it Rains, it Pours" (ABC)	**Magda Szubanski – Kath & Kim: Episode 8 "The Wedding" (ABC)**; Belinda McClory – All Saints: Series 5, Episode 1 "Opening Night" (Seven Network); Rebecca Frith – Secret Bridesmaids' Business (ABC); Sacha Horler – Secret Bridesmaids' Business (ABC)
Best Direction	Best Screenplay
**Brendan Maher – The Road From Coorain (ABC)**; Peter Fisk – All Saints: Series 5, Episode 1 "Opening Night" (Seven Network); Ken Cameron – Halifax f.p.: Series 6, Episode 3 "Takes Two" (Nine Network); Richard Jasek – The Secret Life of Us: Episode 18 "Intimations of Mortality" (Network Ten)	**Gina Riley and Jane Turner – Kath & Kim: Episode 8 "The Wedding" (ABC)**; Katherine Thomson – Halifax f.p.: Series 6, Episode 3 "Takes Two" (Nine Network); Gina Riley and Jane Turner – Kath & Kim: Episode 2 "Gay" (ABC); Christopher Lee – The Secret Life of Us: Episode 18 "Intimations of Mortality" (Network Ten)
Best Children's Television Drama	
**Short Cuts (Seven Network) – Margot McDonald**; Escape of the Artful Dodger (Nine Network) – Roger Mirams, Howard Rubie and Emanuel Matsos; Southern Cross (Nine Network) – Sue Taylor and Paul Barron; Tracey McBean (ABC) – Noel Price, Charlotte Damgaard and Mark Irvine	

=== Non-feature film ===
Best Documentary	Best Direction in a Documentary
**A Wedding in Ramallah – Sherine Salama**; East Timor, Birth of a Nation: Rosa's Story – Luigi Acquisto and Stella Zammataro; Rainbow Bird and Monster Man – John Lewis; The Diaries of Vaslav Nijinski – Paul Cox and Aanya Whitehead	**Sherine Salama – A Wedding in Ramallah**; Luigi Acquisto – East Timor, Birth Of A Nation: Rosa's Story; Michael Rubbo – Much Ado About Something; Dennis K. Smith – Rainbow Bird and Monster Man
Best Short Fiction Film	Best Short Animation
**The Host – Nicholas Tomnay**; Eve of Adha – Leonard Yip; Into the Night – Tony Krawitz; Roundabout – Rachel Griffiths	**Shhh... – Adam Robb**; Into the Dark – Dennis Tupicoff; Pa – Neil Goodridge; Show and Tell – Mark Gravas
Best Screenplay in a Short Film	Best Cinematography in a Non-Feature Film
**Cath Moore – Into the Night**; Leonard Yip – Eve of Adha; Ben Chessell – The Only Person in the World; Matthew Hawkins – The Shot	**Denson Baker – Jack**; Valeriu Campan – East Timor, Birth of a Nation: Rosa's Story; Tristan Milani ACS – Roundabout; Simon Smith – Surviving Shepherd's Pie
Best Editing in a Non-Feature Film	Best Sound in a Non-Feature Film
**Uri Mizrahi – Rainbow Bird and Monster Man**; Terrence Doran – East Timor, Birth of a Nation: Rosa's Story; Merlin Cornish – Jack; Geordie Anderson – Roundabout	**Robert Sullivan and Nigel Christensen – Shadow Play**; Shannon O'Neill – Beginnings; George Craig, Paul Pirola and Skye Ritchie – Roundabout; Sam Petty – Two Thirds Sky: Artists in Desert Country

=== Additional Awards ===
Young Actor's Award	Best Foreign Film
**Emily Browning – Halifax f.p.: Series 6, Episode 2 "Playing God" (Nine Network)**; Luke O'Loughlin – Escape of the Artful Dodger (Nine Network); Everlyn Scampi – Rabbit Proof Fence	**The Lord of the Rings: The Fellowship of the Ring – Peter Jackson, Barrie M. Osborne, Fran Walsh and Tim Sanders**; A Beautiful Mind – Brian Grazer and Ron Howard; Amélie – Claudie Ossard; Gosford Park – Robert Altman, Bob Balaban and David Levy
Open Craft AFI Award – Television	Open Craft AFI Award – Non Feature Film
**The Road From Coorain** **(ABC) – Jo Ford (for Production Design)**; Halifax f.p.: Series 6, Episode 3 "Takes Two" (Nine Network) – Brent Crockett ACS (for Cinematography); The Road From Coorain (ABC) – Tristan Milani ACS (for Cinematography); The Road From Coorain (ABC) – Stephen Rae (for Original Score)	**Dad's Clock** **– Dik Jarman (for Production Design)**; East Timor, Birth of a Nation: Rosa's Story – Kavisha Mazzella, Anito Matos and Helder De Araujo (for Original Score); Rainbow Bird and Monster Man – Neil Angwin (for Production Design); The Way Back – Norman Yemm (for Acting)

=== Individual Awards ===
Award	Winner
Byron Kennedy Award	Rachel Perkins
Raymond Longford Award	Patricia Edgar
Global Achievement Award	Mel Gibson
AFI Screenwriting Prize	Ivan Sen

== Multiple nominations ==
The following films received multiple nominations.

- 10 nominations: Rabbit-Proof Fence
- 9 nominations: Walking on Water
- 6 nominations: Australian Rules, Beneath Clouds and The Tracker

== See also ==
- AACTA Awards
