= Australian Film, Television and Radio School =

Screen and broadcast school

Australian Film Television and Radio School
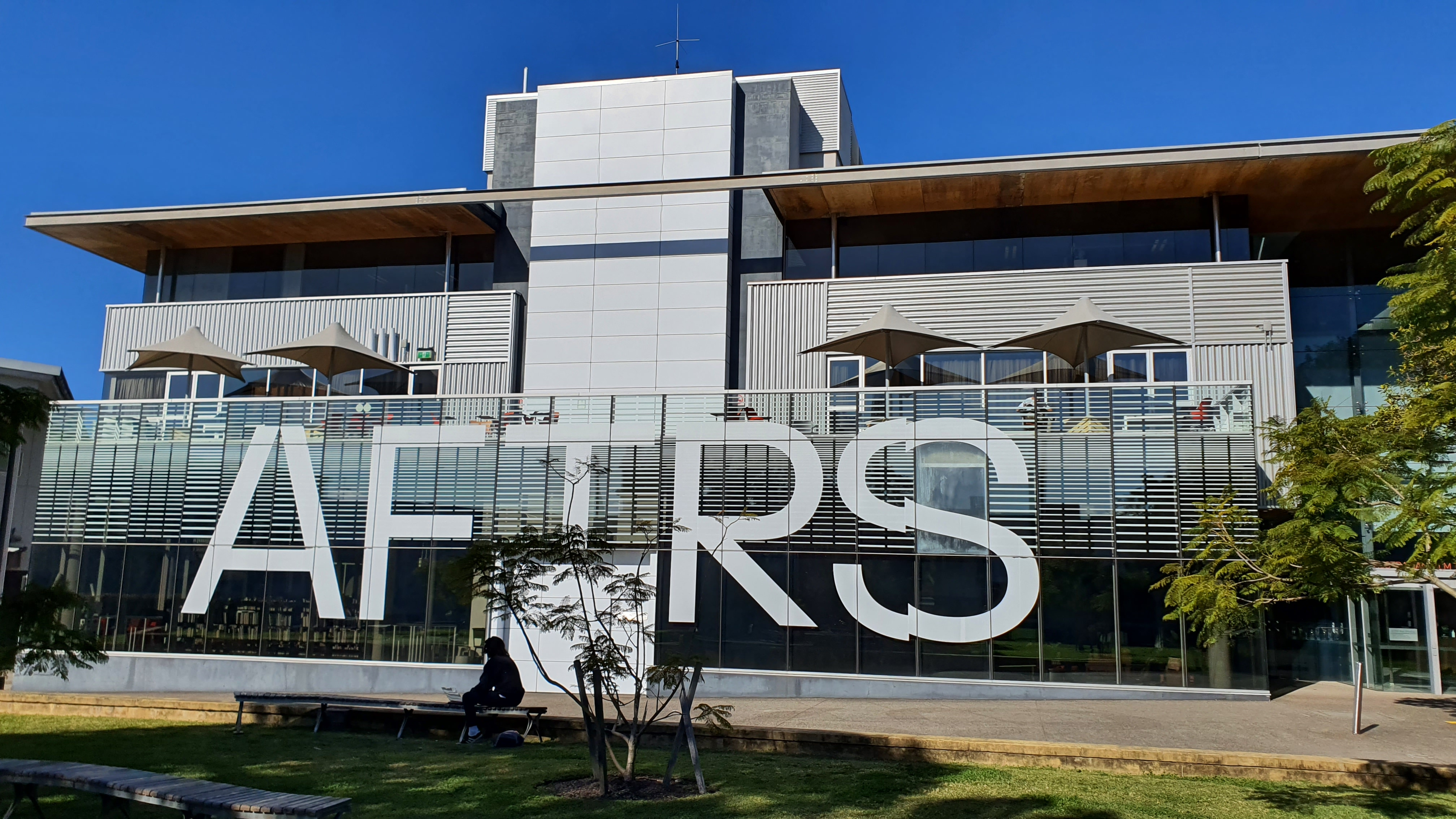
- AFTRS building
- Type: Screen and broadcast school
- Established: 1973; 53 years ago
- Faculty: Film, television, and radio
- Undergraduates: Bachelor of Arts Screen: Production
- Postgraduates: Master of Arts Screen, Master of Arts Screen: Business and Leadership, Graduate Diploma in Radio and Podcasting
- Location: Sydney, New South Wales, Australia; 33.8946°S 151.2285°E
- Campus: The Entertainment Quarter, Moore Park
- Website: aftrs.edu.au

The Australian Film, Television and Radio School (AFTRS), formerly Australian Film and Television School, is Australia's national screen arts and broadcast school. Opened to students in 1973 as Film and Television School (FTS), after accreditation with CILECT it was renamed Australian Film Television School (AFTS) in 1976. To coincide with a move to a new location around 1986, the school was renamed the Australian Film Television and Radio School. The school is a Commonwealth Government statutory authority, and is ranked by The Hollywood Reporter as one of 15 top global film schools.

AFTRS has been the training ground for many of Australia's most well-known directors and other filmmakers, including Gillian Armstrong, Philip Noyce, Rolf de Heer, Rachel Perkins, Ivan Sen, Warwick Thornton, and Kriv Stenders, as well as many cinematographers, film editors, composers, and screenwriters. In addition, there are many radio and television presenters among its alumni, including David Speers.

== History ==
Writer and broadcaster Phillip Adams and polymath and Labor politician Barry Jones campaigned for the establishment of a government-supported film school in Sydney, as members of the Australian Interim Council for a National Film and Television Training School. They had done similar in Melbourne, leading to the first film courses at Swinburne Technical College in the mid-1960s and the later establishment of Swinburne Film and Television School. Their aim was to encourage the development of an Australian film industry through various means, including a national film school and a screen funding organisation. The latter was created as the Australian Film Commission (AFC). (Note: The AFC was later superseded by Screen Australia.) Both major political parties, represented by John Gorton (Liberal) and Gough Whitlam (Labor, prime minister from 1972 to 1974) supported the idea, and in 1972 the Film and Television School (FTS), the new national film school was established. It was opened to students in 1973, with Whitlam officiating at the opening. On 30 May 1973 a bill introduced by Whitlam passed unanimously in the Australian Parliament, establishing the school as an independent body the status of a college of advanced education, receiving its funds from Parliament and directly responsible to the Prime Minister of Australia. Initially it would run three-year, full-time professional training course as well as short-term programs for industry professionals. It was Australia's first national body of its kind, and began with 34 staff members and a consultative panel of nearly 100 industry professionals and educators. On 7 June 1974 the school's inaugural full-time program was issued. Barry Jones, first council chair of the school, said "We must create one of the world's great schools or we must abandon the project at once. We cannot be a hothouse for mediocrity".

The first intake of 12 students on a pilot scheme included future directors and producers Gillian Armstrong, Phillip Noyce, Chris Noonan, James Ricketson, Ron Saunders, and Graham Shirley. In 1973, the staff were led by Storry Walton, who headed the Interim Training Scheme, then became assistant director in 1974, and deputy director in 1976.

In August 1975, the school moved to new purpose-built premises in Lyonpark Road, North Ryde, Sydney. In 1976, FTS was accepted as a full member of the International Association of Film and Television Schools (CILECT), and was renamed the Australian Film Television School (AFTS) in 1976.

In April 1980, deputy director Storry Walton was appointed director after the departure of Toeplitz, who returned to Poland.

In 1978 the school attained its first accreditation, from the Australian Territories Accreditation Committee for Advanced Education, for its "Diploma in Arts, Film and Television". In 1984 it was reaccredited at Bachelor of Arts (university degree level), when it offered specialisations in cinematography, direction, editing, producing, production design, scriptwriting, and sound. Writer/producer/director Kriv Stenders graduated in 1988.

In 1981 A full-time radio course was introduced. In 1986, work began on a new building next to Macquarie University in North Ryde, and AFTS was renamed the Australian Film Television and Radio School (AFTRS).

In 1989, the Australian Film Commission and Film Victoria established the "Women Applying to Film School" initiative in order to increase the low proportion of women being accepted into film schools around the country. In 1990 it was sponsored by Women in Film and Television (Vic), with assistance from Film Victoria, AFTRS, Swinburne Film and Television Department, and the Victorian Department of Labour. The intensive course was offered to nine women each year, and spanned two weeks. Anna Kokkinos was a participant in the scheme at AFTRS in 1990.

According to a study published in 1995, 96% of graduates were employed in the film and television industry. In 1997, a new masters strand was introduced, on documentary filmmaking. In the same year, cinematographer Jan Kenny (the first female cinematographer to attain ACS accreditation) was appointed head of cinematography, a position she held until 2009. Among others, she taught Bonnie Elliott.

In 2002, Annabelle Sheehan was head of film and television. At that time, there was a full-time postgraduate program, described as an "intensive, hands-on, production course", with students working on productions in their chosen specialist roles. There were also short courses offered, linked to the full-time program, for external students. There were then 12 departments at the school, including cinematograph, design, directing, sound, visual effects (one of the few schools globally offering a comprehensive program in Visual Effects Supervision), and production.

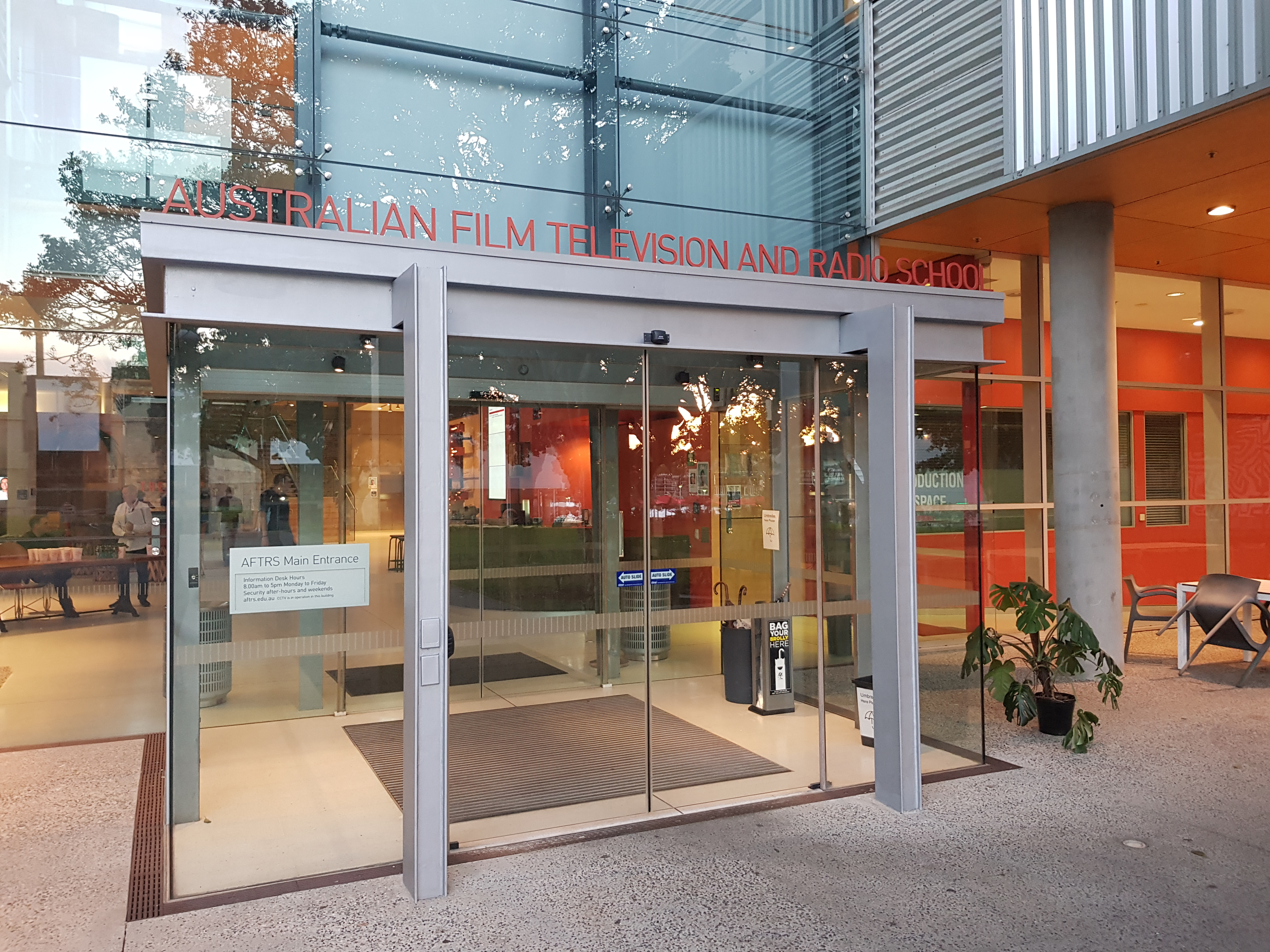
AFTRS Entry doors

In 2008 AFTRS relocated once again, to a state-of-the-art new building at Moore Park.

In 2015, a new degree, Bachelor of Arts (Screen), aiming to provide students with a comprehensive screen education was introduced, and later renamed Bachelor of Arts Screen: Production.

In 2023, on the 50th anniversary of AFTRS, celebrations were held on campus just after O-week, attended by members of the 1973 cohort, including Gillian Armstrong and Philip Noyce. In that year, 38 scholarships were awarded, and an Alumni and Industry Scholarship Fund was established.

== Campus ==
For many years AFTRS was located in purpose-built premises at North Ryde, Sydney. In 2008 the school relocated to a purpose-built facility adjacent to Fox Studios, located inside the Entertainment Quarter in Moore Park, Sydney.

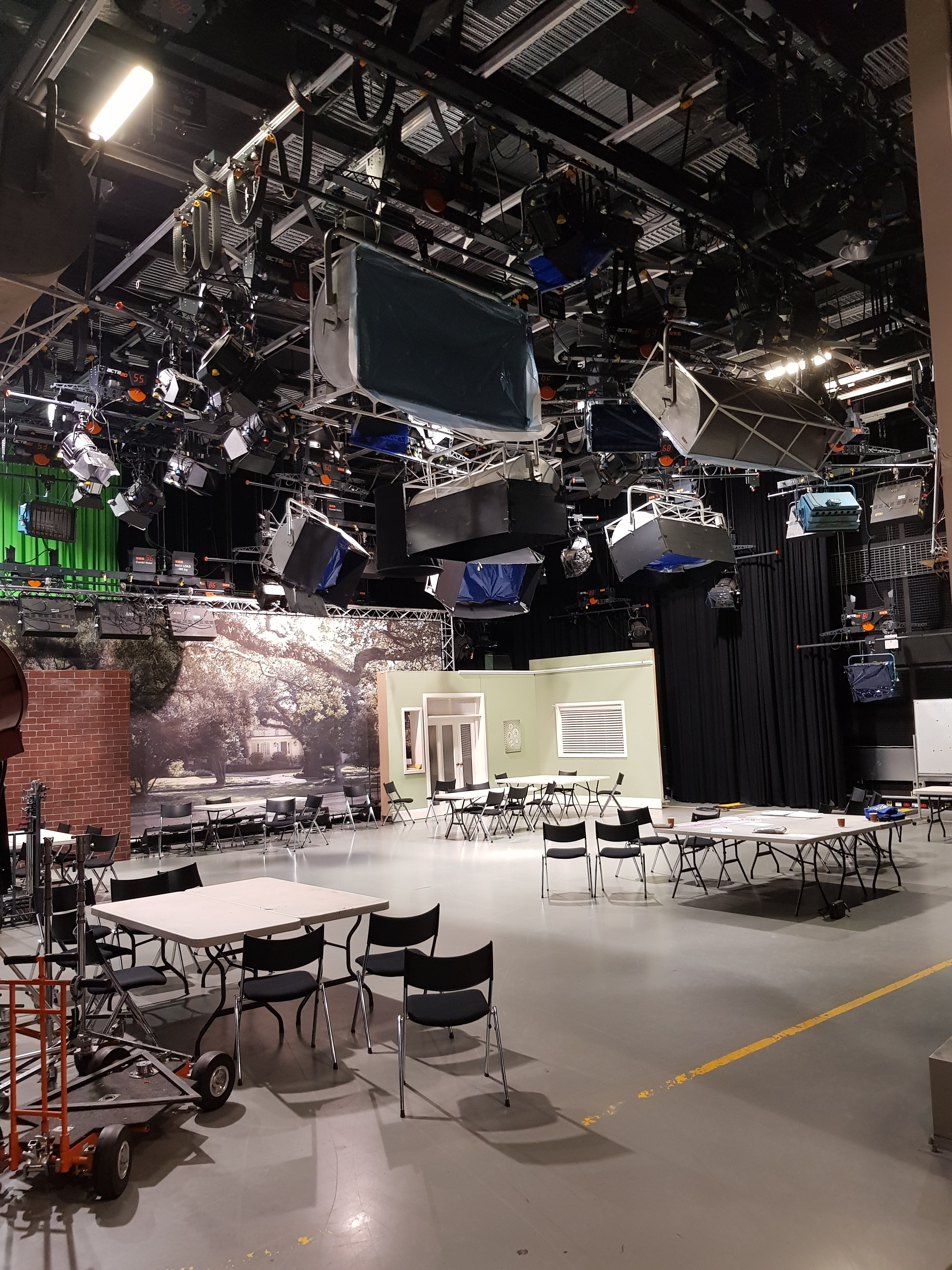
A film studio at AFTRS' Moore Park campus

The campus includes: a full-size 5.1 sound theatre (seats 126), state-of-the-art mix theatre, two large professional film and television studios, film studios, state-of-the-art sound recording studios, and a host of other facilities and equipment.

== Courses and admission ==
Admission into AFTRS degree courses is competitive and based on merit selection. Places are limited. As of 2024 offerings include:

- Master of Arts Screen in 9 disciplines (full-time)
- Master of Arts Screen: Business (full-time or part-time)
- Graduate Diploma in Radio and Podcasting (full-time or part-time)
- Undergraduate degree: Bachelor of Arts Screen: Production (full-time)

== Governance ==
As a statutory body, AFTRS is governed by the Australian Film Television and Radio School Act 1973 with its Council responsible to the Minister for the Arts, representing the Federal Parliament. There are nine members of the Council:

- three appointed by the Governor-General of Australia;
- three members appointed from convocation by the Council;
- the chief executive officer;
- one staff member elected by staff annually; and
- one student member elected by students annually.

As of April 2024, Rachel Perkins is chair of the council, while the CEO is the screenwriter Nell Greenwood.

The school is a member of ARTS8: the Australian Roundtable for Arts Training Excellence, a group of arts training organisations funded by the federal government.

=== Notable staff ===
On 25 June 2007, producer Sandra Levy was appointed CEO of AFTRS. She had previously been director of television at the ABC, head of drama at Zapruder's Other Films, director of development Nine Network, and head of drama at both Southern Star Group and ABC.

Neil Peplow was director of screen at AFTRS, before spending two years at MetFilm School in London, and was then appointed CEO of AFTRS on 9 October 2015. He remained in the position until 2019.

John Haeny served as Head of Sound between 2001 and 2003.

== Accolades and ranking ==
AFTRS has been ranked in The Hollywood Reporter's list of best film schools in the world since its first appearance in 2010, and is the only Australian one listed. In 2023, the school’s 50th year, THR included it as one of 15 top global film schools.

== AFTRS International VR Award ==
Amanda Duthie, Adelaide Film Festival artistic Director and virtual reality champion, along with Google Creative Technologist Mathew Tizard and AFTRS Head of Documentary Rachel Landers, sat on the jury for the inaugural AFTRS International VR Award in 2017. Nothing Happens, by Michelle and Uri Kranot, won the award, while The Other Dakar by Selly Raby, based on Senegalese mythology, received a Special Mention. The Unknown Patient, by Australian director Michael Beets won the award in 2018.

== Alumni ==
Many alumni of the AFTRS have enjoyed success and accolades throughout their careers. Some of them include being nominated for or winning Academy Awards (Oscars). As of 2014, the following students and alumni of AFTRS had been nominated for or won Oscars, including: Four AFTRS student films, nominated:

- Inja (2000), directed by Steve Pasvolsky, produced by Joanne Weatherstone
- Birthday Boy (2003), directed by Sejong Park, produced by Andrew Gregory
- The Saviour, directed by Peter Templeman, produced by Stuart Parkyn
- Emily (2010), directed by Ben Mathews, produced by Simon Moore

Three AFTRS Alumni, winners (to 2014):

- Jane Campion: Best Original Screenplay, The Piano
- Andrew Lesnie: Best Achievement in Cinematography, The Lord of the Rings
- Dion Beebe: Best Achievement in Cinematography, Memoirs of a Geisha

Four AFTRS alumni, nominated (to 2014):

- Dion Beebe: Best Achievement in Cinematography, Chicago
- Jane Campion: Best Director, The Power of the Dog
- Chris Noonan: Best Director, Babe
- Pip Karmel Best Editing, Shine

=== List of notable alumni ===
The entire list of AFTRS graduates by year, from 1973 to present, can be viewed on the School's website.

==== Directing ====
- Mario Andreacchio
- Gillian Armstrong
- Jane Campion
- Alister Grierson
- Rolf de Heer
- Daniel Krige
- Jocelyn Moorhouse
- Chris Noonan
- Phillip Noyce
- Rachel Perkins
- Alex Proyas
- Michael James Rowland
- Ivan Sen
- Cate Shortland
- Kriv Stenders
- Meryl Tankard
- Warwick Thornton
- Samuel Van Grinsven
- Rowan Woods

==== Composing ====
- Amanda Brown
- Benjamin Speed
- Matteo Zingales
- Antony Partos
- Caitlin Yeo

==== Radio ====
- Tim Blackwell
- Stuart Bocking
- Simon Marnie
- Jason Morrison
- Chris Page
- Kent Small
- David Speers

==== Producing ====
- Philippa Northeast
- Peter Rees

==== Screenwriting ====
- Tony McNamara
- John Misto
- Billy Marshall Stoneking

==== Cinematography ====
- Dion Beebe
- Bonnie Elliott
- Andrew Lesnie

==== Editing ====
- Pip Karmel
- Margaret Sixel

==== Design ====
- Felicity Abbott
- Melinda Doring
