= Theodorakis =

Theodorakis (Greek: Θεοδωράκης) is a Greek surname. Notable people with this surname include:

- Mikis Theodorakis (1925–2021), Greek composer and politician
- Maria Theodorakis, Australian actress
- Stavros Theodorakis (born 1963), Greek journalist and politician
