= Swinburne Film and Television School =

Former film school in Melbourne, Australia

Swinburne Film and Television School was a film school that was part of Swinburne Technical College from 1966 until 1991. The college offered the first tertiary course in filmmaking in Australia, and was founded and led for many years by filmmaker Brian Clark Robinson. In 1991, owing to funding difficulties, management of the school was handed over to the Victorian College of the Arts, becoming the VCA Film and Television School (a new entity). The many notable alumni of Swinburne Film and Television School include directors Gillian Armstrong, Garth Davis, Richard Lowenstein, and Sarah Watt, and cartoonist Michael Leunig.

== History ==
The need for a film and television course originally arose from the experience of graphic design graduates in the mid-1960s who were getting jobs in advertising or the television industry without having had enough training in television or film, so the college started offering an elective subject in film and television. The film school, (Note: Variously known as: Swinburne Institute Film and Television School; Swinburne Institute of Technology. Film and Television School; Swinburne Film and Television School; Swinburne Institute of Technology. Film and Television Dept.) which offered the first tertiary course in filmmaking in the country, was founded in 1966 by filmmaker Brian Clark Robinson (1934–1991), after he, along with polymath and MP Barry Jones, broadcaster and writer Phillip Adams, and acclaimed director Fred Schepisi, had campaigned strongly for its establishment.

The first course offered, from 1966, was the Diploma of Art in Film and Television, which was the first such course to be offered in Australia. It was open to school-leavers as well as those with one or more degrees. Part of what was the Graphic Art School became Film and Television, led by Robinson. The courses were always filled to capacity. In 1967 it was known as the Film and Television course of the School of Art.

In 1976, Swinburne formed a department of film and television, with Robinson was appointed its head. Swinburne introduced a Graduate Diploma in Applied Film and Television, offering film, television, and animation courses. This was highly successful, with most of the graduates being employed in the industry afterwards. Animation lecturer John Bird was also a pioneer in the establishment of the school.

In 1980, the Swinburne Film and Television School held an information day, which was captured in photographs held in the Swinburne Commons archive, along with many other photos pertaining to the school. Author and designer Hugh Marchant, who later worked in Art Department on feature films, music videos, and television, wrote in 2009 about making his short film Meanwhile Elsewhere at the film school in 1981. He first attained a graphic design diploma, and was then accepted by Robinson into the postgraduate film course. He wrote: "Swinburne Film & Television School (circa 1980) had a great reputation. It was a rite of passage for many...". A small group of students was dubbed the "Gang of Four" by lecturer Nigel Buesst, owing to their pranks. They once set fire to a paper bin in the lecturers’ office, and may have been responsible for "kidnapping a frozen chicken" from lecturer Peter Tammer. In 1983, an article describing how the courses evolved as well as the current course offering was published in Media Information Australia, by Tony Evans, lecturer in video. At that time, the school offered a three-year Diploma in Film an TV, for school-leavers, as well as a graduate diploma. Their courses included such subjects as history of cinema (taught by John Flaus), scriptwriting, production (TV and film) The graduate students ranged in age from early twenties to mid-fifties, and were drawn from a wide range of disciplines. Over 90% of graduates found employment in the film and television industries.

In 1987, when Robinson was appointed dean of the faculty of arts at the university, he chose Jennifer Sabine to lead the film school. Robinson continued to teach scriptwriting until shortly before his death. Phillip Adams said that Robinson "was responsible for the creation of the first and best film school in Australia".

The school had its 21st anniversary in 1989, on which occasion it was visited by Michael Leunig, who also created a cartoon poster to commemorate the event. In September 1991 Swinburne Film and Television School celebrated its 25th anniversary.

Richard Lowenstein later wrote that despite a chronic lack of funding, the film school was "one of the best and most unique film schools in the world", led by "father-confessor-therapist" Robinson. He also wrote of a "war between the Australian Film Television & Radio School and Swinburne" which continued through the 1970s and 1980s, "with Swinburne's ideas and content winning out over AFTRS' money and style".

From January 1991, the ownership and management of the school was handed over to the Victorian College of the Arts, becoming the VCA Film and Television School. Per an announcement in Filmnews in August 1990, the Swinburne Film and Television School was officially transferred to the VCA from January 1991, but would stay at Swinburne until it was able to move to a new building in South Melbourne (funded by $12m from the federal government) in 1993. VCA would merge with Melbourne University during 1991.

In April 2002, the congress of the CILECT (Centre International de Liaison des Ecoles de Cinema et de Television), the international association of the world's major film and television schools, was held at the film school at VCA. At that time, the other main practical film courses in Australia were offered at the Australian Film, Television and Radio School (Sydney), Royal Melbourne Institute of Technology, Queensland College of Art (now Queensland College of Art & Design, with Griffith Film School taking over since 2004), Charles Sturt University (Wagga Wagga, NSW; no longer offered), and Flinders University (Adelaide).

The 25th anniversary of the new school's foundation at the VCA was celebrated in June 2016.

== Women Applying to Film School ==
In the late 1980s, although around the same number of men and women were applying to film schools and being interviewed, a much smaller number of women were accepted for courses. It was surmised that the main two reasons were firstly, that women often have no access to the means of film or video production, so have no work to submit to support their applications; and secondly, their performance at interview was affected by lack of confidence.

In 1989, the Australian Film Commission and Film Victoria established the "Women Applying to Film School" initiative. The following year, it was sponsored by Women in Film and Television (Vic), with assistance from Film Victoria, the Australian Film, Television and Radio School, Swinburne Film and Television Department, and the Victorian Department of Labour. The intensive course, which was developed and administered by Lou Hubbard and producer Sue Maslin, was offered to nine women each year, and spanned two weeks. Each student was given the opportunity to write and direct a three-minute video, and various sessions gave them detailed information about the process of applying to film school, the schools themselves and the Australian film industry. Ana Kokkinos was a participant in 1990.

== Book ==
In 1996, Barbara Paterson published Renegades: Australia's first film school: from Swinburne to VCA, with an introduction by Phillip Adams, based on her 1993 masters thesis, "Portrait of a film school : the history of the Victorian College of the Arts School of Film and Television, formerly known as Swinburne Film and Television School". Richard Lowenstein, appraising the work, called it a "brave attempt at an immense task", to capture 30 years of the history of the school.

== Archives ==
The VCA Film and Television Archive holds around 1,700 short films dating from 1967, which includes the work produced by graduating students of Swinburne Film and Television School students as well as students and faculty of the VCA School of Film and Television School.

== Notable people ==
=== Staff ===
- Nigel Buesst, filmmaker
- Peter Tammer, filmmaker and lecturer

=== Alumni ===
- Gillian Armstrong: director
- Jill Bilcock: film editor (Moulin Rouge!)
- Garth Davis: film director, Lion (2016)
- Andrew Dominik: film director, Chopper (2000)
- Paul Goldman: director
- Geoffrey Hall: cinematographer
- Mark Hartley: film director, Not Quite Hollywood: The Wild, Untold Story of Ozploitation! (2008)
- John Hillcoat
- Clayton Jacobson: film director, Kenny
- Chris Kennedy
- Michael Leunig, cartoonist
- Richard Lowenstein: film director, He Died with a Felafel in His Hand (2001)
- Nique Needles
- John Ruane (director of Death in Brunswick)
- Roger Scholes ("Best Director" in the post-graduate course)
- Sarah Watt (Graduate Diploma of Film and Television) (Animation), 1990; director of Look Both Ways (2005)
