= Blue Murder (Beatrix Christian play) =

Beatrix Christian play

- Author: Beatrix Christian
- Cover artist: Kate Florance
- Language: English
- Genre: Play
- Publisher: Currency Press
- Publication date: 1994
- Publication place: Australia
- Media type: Print (Paperback)
- ISBN: 9780868194059

An Australian play written by playwright, Beatrix Christian, which tells the story of Evelyn Carr. who leaves her home town to come to Blackrock to work for Blue, a children's writer. Acting as mentor, Blue leads Evelyn on a journey of self-discovery that is magical, sensuous and frightening (5 acts, 2 men, 4 women). Blue Murder is a complex study of the way men have created the fantasy that their art is more important than reality - even more real than death.

It has been published by Currency Press since 1994.

== First production ==
Blue Murder was first performed by Company B at the Belvoir Street Theatre, Sydney on 5 April 1994.

=== Cast ===
- Lucy Bell as Eve
- Kelly Butler as Angel
- Rebecca Frith as Leura
- Sacha Horler as Rose
- Jamie Jackson as Lyle & Roy
- Jacek Koman as Blue

=== Crew ===
- Director: Antoinette Blaxland
- Designer: Dan Potra
- Lighting: Rory Dempster
- Sound design: Paul Healy
