= A Man's Gotta Do =

A Man’s Gotta Do
- Directed by: Chris Kennedy
- Produced by: Chris Kennedy; John Winter
- Starring: John Howard; Rebecca Frith; Alyssa McClelland
- Edited by: Emma Hay
- Music by: Peter Best
- Release date: 4 November 2004 (AUS)
- Running time: 95 minutes
- Country: Australia
- Language: English
- Box office: A$154,971 (Australia)

A Man's Gotta Do is a 2004 Australian film from Australian director, Chris Kennedy. The film stars John Howard.

== Tagline ==
"Most men hold their head high, put their backs to the wall and do what they must do to give their family what they want."

== Cast ==
- John Howard as Eddy
- Rebecca Frith as Yvonne
- Alyssa McClelland as Chantelle
- Gyton Grantley as Dominic
- Rohan Nichol as Paul
- Helen Thomson as Tina

== Plot ==
Eddy (John Howard), lives with his wife, Yvonne (Rebecca Frith), and their daughter, Chantelle (Alyssa McClelland). Middle-aged and unrefined, he is a fisherman by day, but by night he works as a toe-cutting standover man.

Eddy is out of touch with his family. His wife Yvonne, feels sexually-frustrated and unfulfilled and wants another child. He is barely able to converse with his daughter Chantelle, who maintains that her father has no feelings. Chantelle is also engaged to marry a man that he disapproves of. Her fiancé then disappears and she becomes increasingly depressed.

The young and clumsy, but well-meaning Dominic (Gyton Grantley), Eddy's new apprentice, suggests that Eddy get to know his daughter better. In agreement, Eddy persuades Dominic read Chantelle's diary, to get some insight on how he might be able to reconnect with her and improve their relationship.

== Shooting locations ==
The film was shot around Port Kembla and Wollongong, in New South Wales.

== Reception ==
=== Reviews ===
The film received mixed reviews. On Australian TV show At the Movies, David Stratton and Margaret Pomeranz gave it three and a half stars and three stars, respectively.

On Metacritic, the film has a weighted average score of 41 out of 100, based on 9 critics, indicating "mixed or average" reviews, Matt Singer from The Village Voice giving it 30/100 and Eddie Cockrell from Variety giving it 60/100.

=== Awards ===
The film won the Golden Zenith Audience Award for the Best Film from Oceania at the Montreal World Film Festival. It also won an award at the 2004 Montreal World Film Festival and screened at the 2005 London Australian Film Festival.

== See also ==
- Cinema of Australia
