= How Willingly You Sing =

- Directed by: Gary Patterson
- Written by: Gary Patterson
- Produced by: Gary Patterson
- Cinematography: Peter Tammer
- Edited by: Gary Patterson
- Production company: Inch Films
- Distributed by: Melbourne Filmmakers Cooperative Ltd.
- Release date: August 1975
- Country: Australia
- Language: English
- Budget: $12,000

How Willingly You Sing is a 1975 low budget Australian feature film. It was shot over four weeks.

== Premise ==
Simon Dore is a young a young architecture graduate who tries to find himself in society.

== Cast ==
- Gary Patterson as Simon Dore
- Isaac Gerson
- Jim Robertson
- Jerry Powderly
- Morris Gradman
- Braham Glass
- Allan Levy

== Production ==
Gary Patterson had just made Retreat Retreat.

Patterson said "My movie doesn't really have an angle, its just sort of biographic in a way. Objectively biographical enough to interest other people. The only line that I think might be relevant is the one we approached before on humour and comedy."

== Reception ==
Filmnews called it "an extraordinary film."

Colin Bennett of The Age said it was " "crammed with marvellous ideas — throwaway verbal gags and facetiousdialogue, diverting paradox and Lewis Carroll logic . . . Gary is really a one-man band: clown-mime, cartoonist, parable teller, ukelele strummer, as well as writer, director and editor with a well timed sense of the absurd."

Patterson said "The first third of the film is recognizable funny, cliched stuff, laugh inducing, structured comedy, and obviously the weakest. But thats alright, because its autobiographic and representative of that old style of comedy I used to do on stage."

Melbourne Filmmakers Co-op were unhappy with the film's treatment in Sydney.

== Awards ==
The film shared the award for creativity at the 1976 AFI Awards with Pure Shit.
