= Jindabyne (film) =

2006 Australian drama film

- Theatrical release poster
- Directed by: Ray Lawrence
- Screenplay by: Beatrix Christian
- Based on: "So Much Water So Close to Home" by Raymond Carver
- Produced by: Philippa Bateman; Garry Charny; Catherine Jarman
- Starring: Gabriel Byrne; Laura Linney; Deborra-Lee Furness; John Howard; Riley von Husen
- Cinematography: David Williamson
- Edited by: Karl Sodersten
- Music by: Paul Kelly; Dan Luscombe
- Distributed by: Roadshow Films
- Release date: 20 July 2006
- Running time: 123 minutes
- Country: Australia
- Language: English
- Budget: $10.8 million
- Box office: $6 million

Jindabyne is a 2006 Australian drama film by third time feature director Ray Lawrence and starring Gabriel Byrne, Laura Linney, Deborra-Lee Furness and John Howard. Jindabyne was filmed entirely on location in and around the Australian country town of the same name, situated next to the Snowy Mountains.

It was one of a rush of over 16 Australian cinema releases that year. Critics praised its refinement and the film is credited as a signal of Australian cinema's maturity.

The screenplay was written by Beatrix Christian, and was adapted from the late American short story writer and poet Raymond Carver's 1975 title, "So Much Water So Close to Home". The short story was the basis for a segment in Robert Altman's Short Cuts (1993). Carver's story had also been retold in music by Australian artist Paul Kelly in the song "Everything's Turning to White", on his 1989 album So Much Water So Close to Home. Kelly contributed to the score of the 2006 film as well.

Jindabyne had its world premiere at the 2006 Cannes Film Festival and its North American premiere at the 2006 Toronto International Film Festival. The film was released in Australia on 20 July 2006 and was released in the United States on 27 April 2007. Its production budget was reportedly $10.8 million. The film was financed, produced and marketed by Sydney-based production company April Films, and majority funded by private investors.

The film was a box office failure, only grossing $6 million of its alleged budget. However, it received a generally warm critical reception.

== Plot ==
On an annual fishing trip in the high country, Stewart (Gabriel Byrne), Carl (John Howard), Rocco (Stelios Yiakmis) and Billy (Simon Stone) find a girl's body in the river; she has been murdered by Gregory (Chris Haywood), a local electrician. The girl (Tatea Reilly) turns out to be Aboriginal. The discovery shocks and confuses the men. Only the youngest, Billy, understands this is a crime but he is ignored. The men suggest hiking back next morning as it is too late to safely navigate their way. Stewart ties the girl's body to the riverbank. However, Stewart goes fishing the next day and, after catching a large fish, the men decide to stay the rest of the afternoon before going to inform the police in the morning.

Meanwhile, some of the men's wives (Jude and Claire) and Rocco's girlfriend (Carmel), get together socially. Jude (Carl's wife) reveals their daughter died nearly two years ago, leaving them to raise their granddaughter Caylin-Calandria, who has psychological issues and towards whom Jude shows resentment. When Stewart's wife, Claire (Laura Linney) does not think Stewart wants more children, Jude reveals that Claire had a mental breakdown and left the family for 18 months after her son Tom was born.

The men return home late Sunday night. After reporting the body to the police, they go to their respective homes. Stewart finds Claire sleeping prone, reminiscent of the dead body. He initiates intimacy, but does not disclose the find.

The next morning, the police show up at Claire and Stewart's house to interview Stewart. At the police station, the police officer expresses his disgust to the men that they would "fish over a dead body," instead of reporting it immediately. Claire keeps trying to understand Stewart's reasons. The men come up with a story that Carl strained his ankle thus they could not walk back easily. Because the girl was Aboriginal, some believe the men neglected the dead girl. The men's businesses are vandalised by some of the Aboriginal community, with painted slurs branding them racists. It becomes clear from this point that the western culture of an immigrant town that had to be abandoned and rebuilt on higher ground because of a dam, is at odds with the ancient beliefs of the Aboriginals.

Claire and Elissa (Billy's partner) are the only ones who express any remorse and condemnation. Jude defends her husband Carl, while Carl argues that the girl was already dead and thus it made no difference whether they stayed or not. The more Claire pushes Stewart and the others to make amends, the further the tensions increase in the town.

Prior to the fishing trip, Claire had had morning sickness, which she hides. With her marriage unravelling, and haunted by her post-partum breakdown and abandonment of her first child, she asks a doctor about an abortion. However, she has still not gone through with it - nor revealed her pregnancy to Stewart - by the end of the film.

Despite hostility from the group, Claire tries to reach out to the girl's family. She gathers donations to give to the girl's family for her funeral. Claire even goes to the family's home and is rebuked. She later returns to give them the money she has gathered.

Increasingly troubled that Claire continues to probe for the truth, Stewart erupts in rage one evening when Claire asks him to talk about it. The two begin fighting physically, while slinging barbs at each other. The next day, after Billy and his family have left town, Stewart tells Claire - who he suspects is planning to leave him - that he will never allow her to take his son. Carl similarly stands up for Caylin-Calandria after Jude once again shows anger towards her, saying she cannot take her pain of losing their daughter out on their blameless granddaughter.

The next day, Claire goes to the memorial service. The rest of the men and their wives, as well as the children, show up to pay their respects. When Stewart apologises on behalf of the men, the girl's father throws dirt on him, spits on the ground and walks away, but there are no further objections to their presence. Stewart also asks Claire to come home.

Throughout the movie, the murdering electrician continuously pops up, and even attends the memorial service. He is never caught.

== Cast ==
- Laura Linney as Claire
- Gabriel Byrne as Stewart
- Deborra-Lee Furness as Jude
- John Howard as Carl
- Chris Haywood as Gregory
- Leah Purcell as Carmel
- Eva Lazzaro as Caylin-Calandria
- Eva Rees as Tom
- Alice Garner as Elissa
- Stelios Yiakmis as Rocco
- Simon Stone as Billy
- Betty Lucas as Vanessa
- Tatea Reilly as Susan
- Riley von Husen as Trout
- Ursula Yovich as Alice
- Bud Tingwell as Minister
- Bob Baines as Doctor #1

== Reception ==
=== Box office ===
Jindabyne grossed $400,438 in Australia and $5,643,674 internationally for a total of just over $6 million, against a production budget of $10.8 million.

=== Critical response ===
On Rotten Tomatoes, the film has an approval rating of 65%, based on 100 reviews, and an average rating of 5.60/10. The website's critical consensus reads, "Jindabyne's disparate themes may not quite cohere, but the film features fine performances from Linney and Byrne." On Metacritic the film has a score of 65% based on reviews from 30 critics, indicating "generally favorable reviews".

Peter Bradshaw of The Guardian, gave the film 5 stars and wrote, "The movie is beautifully shot, and succeeds in being deeply disturbing and mysterious, with richly achieved nuances of characterisation. I have seen it two or three times now, and each time it gets better."

A. O. Scott of The New York Times wrote that "The real flaw is that the movie's best features — the aching clarity of its central performances — threaten to be lost in a wilderness of metaphor and mystification." The Age hailed it as "easily one of the most engrossing, thoughtful, adult-oriented big-screen dramas produced in Australia for 20 years."

=== Festivals ===
- 2006 – France – Cannes Film Festival, Official Selection Director's Fortnight
- 2006 – UK – Edinburgh International Film Festival
- 2006 – Canada – Toronto International Film Festival
- 2006 – Spain – Valladolid International Film Festival
- 2007 – Ireland – Jameson Dublin International Film Festival

=== Awards ===
Won:

- 2006 Film Critics Circle of Australia Awards: Best Director, Best Adapted Screenplay, Best Cinematography, Best Actress in a Supporting Role (Deborra-Lee Furness).
- 2006 Valladolid International Film Festival: Best Actress (Laura Linney), Best Music.
- 2006 Stockholm Film Festival: Best Manuscript (by Beatrix Christian), FIPRESCI Prize for Best Film.
- 2006 Aria Fine Arts Award: Best Soundtrack (Australia)
- 2006 Australian Screen Sound Guild Awards: Best Achievement in Sound for Film Sound Recording, Best Achievement in Sound for Film Sound Mixing, Feature Film Soundtrack of the Year.
- 2006 Edinburgh Film Festival: Herald Angel Award
- 2006 SPAA Independent Producer of the Year Award - April Films

Nominated:

- 2006 Australian Film Institute Awards: Best Film, Best Direction, Best Adapted Screenplay, Best Cinematography, Best Sound, Best Original Music Score, Best Actor in a Lead Role (Gabriel Byrne), Best Actress in a Lead Role (Laura Linney), Best Actress in a Supporting Role (Deborra-Lee Furness).
- 2006 IF Awards: Best Director, Best Actress (Laura Linney), Best Actor (Gabriel Byrne), Best Cinematography.
- 2006 Film Critics Circle of Australia Awards: Best Film, Best Actress in a Lead Role (Laura Linney), Best Actor in a Supporting Role (John Howard), Best Music Score.
- 2006 Valladolid International Film Festival: Golden Spike (Ray Lawrence).
- 2006 Australian Screen Sound Guild Awards: Best Achievement in Sound For Film Sound Recording, Best Achievement in Sound for Film Sound Design, Best Achievement in Sound for Film Sound Mixing, Feature Film Soundtrack of the Year.

== Soundtrack ==
A soundtrack was released by Capitol Records in 2006. At the ARIA Music Awards of 2006 the soundtrack won the ARIA Award for Best Original Soundtrack, Cast or Show Album.

=== Track listing ===
1. "Rocks"
2. "Jindabyne Fair"
3. "Body Drop"
4. "Claire On The Road"
5. "Mirror"
6. "Morning Fishing"
7. "Stewart And Claire"
8. "Power Lines"
9. "Nukkanya"
10. "Night River"
11. "So Soft"
12. "Going to Susan's"
13. "Welcome Dance"
14. "Way That I Love You"
15. "Humming Way"
16. "Troitsa Bratya"
17. "Everything's Turning to White"
