= Through My Eyes (miniseries) =

Australian television crime drama

- Genre: Crime drama
- Written by: Tony Cavanaugh; Simone North
- Directed by: Di Drew
- Starring: Miranda Otto; Craig McLachlan; Peter O'Brien; Shaun Micallef; Steven Vidler; Stephen Anderton; Graeme Blundell; Nadine Garner
- Composer: Mark Seymour
- Country of origin: Australia
- No. of series: 1
- No. of episodes: 2

Production
- Executive producers: Mikael Borglund; John Holmes
- Producers: Tony Cavanaugh; Simone North
- Cinematography: Phil Cross
- Editors: Andrew Macneil; Neil Thumpston
- Running time: 95 minutes
- Production company: Liberty Films International

Original release
- Network: Seven Network
- Release: 23 October – 24 October 2004

Through My Eyes (also known as Through My Eyes: The Lindy Chamberlain Story) is a two-part Australian television crime drama, written by Tony Cavanaugh and Simone North, that is based upon the memoirs of Lindy Chamberlain-Creighton, whose nine-week-old baby Azaria was taken by a dingo from her family's tent near Uluru in Australia's remote Northern Territory. Directed by Di Drew, the miniseries broadcast on the Seven Network at 8:30 pm on 23 and 24 October 2004. A broadcast in New Zealand followed in August 2005.

To date, the series has yet to be broadcast outside of Australia and New Zealand. The series was released on Region 4 DVD via Magna Pacific in 2005, before being reissued on 7 July 2010. Both titles are now out of print.

For her role as Lindy Chamberlain, Miranda Otto was awarded the Silver Logie Award for Outstanding Lead Actress in a Drama Series.

== Production ==
Although not part of the actual filming, Lindy acted as one of nearly 300 consultants to the series' producers, and also visited the set twice to speak with members of the cast and crew.

== Reception ==
A review of the first episode in The Age commented; "Director Di Drew, working from a script by producers Tony Cavanaugh and Simone North, keeps the emphasis firmly on drama rather than documentary, skilfully teasing out themes of media behaviour, religious intolerance and the palpable public disdain over Lindy's steely emotional response to the loss of her child. And there are powerhouse performances throughout. As Lindy, headliner Miranda Otto has clearly studied the contemptuous scowl Meryl Streep gave her in Evil Angels, while Craig McLachlan as Lindy's husband Michael frankly acquits himself better than his CV would lead you to expect."

A review in The Sydney Morning Herald added; "Five hours over two nights is a daunting prospect, especially when the Lindy Chamberlain story is so well documented, but there are plenty of surprises and it's a story that bears further scrutiny. Miranda Otto and Craig McLachlan are superb as the devout, naive Chamberlains, a couple hopelessly out of their depth. Otto perfectly captures Lindy's unemotive intensity, while McLachlan's physical transformation is eerie."

== Cast ==
- Miranda Otto as Lindy Chamberlain
- Craig McLachlan as Michael Chamberlain
- Peter O'Brien as Ian Barker Q.C.
- Shaun Micallef as Jack Winneke Q.C.
- Steven Vidler as Inspector Graeme Charlwood
- Stephen Anderton as Ian Cawood
- Graeme Blundell as Rex Kuchel
- Nadine Garner as Sally Lowe
- Chris Haywood as Des Sturgess Q.C.
- Andrew McFarlane as John Phillips Q.C.
- Travis McMahon as Frank Morris
- Paul Mercurio as Max Cromwell
- Rex Granites as Nipper Winmatti
- Stephen Jenkins as Jim Metcalfe
- Veronica Neave as Phyllis Cromwell
- Erik Thomson as Professor James Cameron
- Barry Otto as Frank Cocks
- John McArdle as McAulay
- Robert Coleby
- Rebecca Frith as Robertson
- Angie Milliken as Joe Kuhl
- Alan David Lee as Gilroy
- Simon Westaway as Dennis Barritt
- Aaron Blabey as Kirkham
- Lorraine Bayly as Avis
- Jerome Ehlers as Odontologist, Ken Brown
- Lucy Bell as Juror
