= This Won't Hurt a Bit =

- Directed by: Chris Kennedy
- Written by: Chris Kennedy
- Produced by: Patrick Fitzgerald; Chris Kennedy
- Starring: Greig Pickhaver; Jacqueline McKenzie
- Cinematography: Marc Spicer
- Edited by: Peter Butt
- Music by: Mario Grigoriv
- Distributed by: Beyond Films
- Release date: 12 November 1993
- Running time: 82 minutes
- Country: Australia
- Language: English
- Box office: A$6,686 (Australia)

This Won't Hurt a Bit is a 1993 Australian comedy film. It was directed by Chris Kennedy.

According to Ozmovies,

Those searching for the source of inspiration for writer/director and co-producer Chris Kennedy need look no further than his professional life as a dentist, which saw him do time in England practising his skills. It’s perhaps pushing things to say that he dreamed up the idea of revenge on the English while peering into the mouths of his English patients, but his screenplay is filled with knowing nods in this direction.

== Cast ==
- Greig Pickhaver as Gordon Fairweather
- Jacqueline McKenzie as Vanessa Prescott
- Maggie King as Mrs. Prescott
- Patrick Blackwell as Mr. Prescott
- Dennis Miller as Riley
- Adam Stone as Farow
- Gordon Chater as Dental Professor
- Alwyn Kurts as Psychiatrist
- Colleen Clifford as Lady Smith

== Release ==
The film opened at the Dendy Cinema in Sydney on 14 October 1993 for a short run, and from 11 November 1993 it had a short run at the Carlton Moviehouse in Melbourne.

== Reception ==
The film is described as "a bizarre and different comedy in a docu-dramatic style, set in Hong Kong, England and Australia, about an Australian dentist who overservices the British public and then goes on the run from Interpol."
