= Secret Bridesmaids' Business (play) =

1999 play by Australian playwright Elizabeth Coleman

- Written by: Elizabeth Coleman
- Original language: English

Premiere
- Date premiered: 1999

Secret Bridesmaids' Business is a play by Australian playwright Elizabeth Coleman that premiered in 1999. It was adapted into a TV movie of the same name in 2002.

Meg Bacon is preparing for her wedding along with her mother and her bridesmaids, one of whom knows the fiance has been cheating on her.

The first run of Secret Bridesmaids' Business ran in Melbourne at the Playbox before moving up to Sydney at Wharf1. The cast was Ulli Birve as Meg, Joan Sydney as her mother Sydney, Tara Morice and Kate Johnston as bridesmaids Angela and Lucy, Rachael Beck as substitute bridesmaid Naomi and Fred Whitlock as fiance James. Dina Ross in the Age wrote "Secret Bridesmaids' Business is a play that transcends national identity, dealing as it does with universal emotions. With its superlative cast, this is the kind of high-spirited romp you could see very easily in London's West End." Doug Anderson of the Sydney Morning Herald says "The production clips along cheerfully, shearing unnecessarily into farce briefly and losing fluency through awkward transitions around the monologues." The Australian's Lee Christof says "Like many marriages, the play sets off from a rocky beginning to a point of comfortable security, leaving some terrific lines, great laughs and obvious truths about friendship, loyalty and truthfulness in its wake."

It returned in 2000, with a changed cast, for a 42 town tour around the country. The new cast saw Sydney and Johnston returning with Jane Hall as Meg Bacon, Roz Hammond as Angela, Nicole Nabout as Naomi and Scott Irwin as James. Valerie Bader took over the role of Colleen later in the tour. The Age's Steven Carroll said that on opening night "the revival is flat compared to the original show" saying the acting was not at the same level, exposing the shortcomings in the script. Similarly Helen Thomson in the Age criticised the acting, finishing "New audiences will not be comparing this production with the original, but they may wonder what all the fuss was about when they see this lacklustre version."
