= Beatrix Christian =

Australian playwright and screenwriter

- Born: 1955 (age 70–71)
- Occupation: Australian screenwriter
- Writing career
- Notable works: Blue Murder (1994), Jindabyne (2006), Picnic at Hanging Rock (2018)

Beatrix Christian is an Australian playwright and screenwriter.

Beatrix Christian graduated from National Institute of Dramatic Art in 1991, and her first play, "Spumante Romantica", was produced the next year by the Griffin Theatre in Sydney. Her 1994 play, Blue Murder performed at both Belvoir St Theatre and Eureka! Theatre, won the Sydney Theatre of Critics’ circle award for the best new play. She was also nominated for both an Australian Writers Guild and NSW Premiere's Literary Award for her 1997 play, The Governor’s Family. The following year she won the Australian National Playwright's Conference New Dramatists’ Award.

She has worked as a writer for the Sydney Theatre since 2001 and, in addition to her own work, has adapted other plays, including Ibsen's A Doll's House.

Christian wrote the screenplay for the 2006 Ray Lawrence film Jindabyne, which she adapted from the short story, "So Much Water So Close to Home", by Raymond Carver. She worked on the 2018 TV mini-series, Picnic at Hanging Rock, as script writer for four episodes and script producer for all six.

In 2019 she co-wrote the film Hearts and Bones (2019) with director Ben Lawrence and actor Hugo Weaving.
