= The Missing (1999 film) =

- Directed by: Manuela Alberti
- Written by: Manuela Alberti
- Produced by: Lynda House; Jim Stark
- Starring: Fabrizio Bentivoglio
- Cinematography: Geoffrey Hall
- Edited by: Ken Sallows
- Music by: Bruce Smeaton
- Production company: Panorama Film Studios
- Distributed by: Roadshow Films
- Release date: November 11, 1999
- Running time: 92 minutes
- Country: Australia
- Language: English
- Box office: A$15,091 (Australia)

The Missing is a 1999 Australian film about an Italian priest who visits Australia.

== Plot ==
High-ranking Vatican priest Monsignor Tommaso (Fabrizio Bentivoglio) has a secret past he has tried to forget. On a working stint in Australia fifteen years earlier, he fathered a daughter, by Susan (Rebecca Frith). The daughter, Angela is now missing under mysterious circumstances, and with a series of unsolved murders in the area, her mother, Susan, fears she may have fallen victim to a serial killer. Tommaso travels to Melbourne, where he encounters mysterious Aboriginal tracker Willie (David Ngoombujarra), a man who has appeared in his dreams. Willie offers to help him find his daughter, and the two embark on a journey that will challenge Tommaso's faith and ultimately change his life forever.

== Cast ==
- Fabrizio Bentivoglio as Tommaso
- David Ngoombujarra as Willie
- John Moore as Sutherland
- Rebecca Frith as Susan
- Fiorenzo Fiorentini as Valetti
- Syd Brisbane as Customs Official

== Production ==
=== Filming locations ===
Filming locations included Melbourne, Parachilna in South Australia, Broken Hill in New South Wales, and Rome. The interior Vatican scenes were shot on location in Melbourne's State Library building. The Cathedral Room of Melbourne's ANZ Bank was also used as a stand-in for Vatican scenes. The Melbourne Showgrounds was the site for the unit in Melbourne.

== Reception ==
David Stratton from The Movie Show said: "In the end, this is another fish out of water film - a European in the outback story. As the priest, a lost man both literally and symbolically, popular Italian actor Bentivoglio is rather uninspiring – but David Ngoombujarra more than makes up for his co-star's deficiencies with a commanding performance. Still, writer-director Manuela Alberti has come up with a scrappy piece of work which looks as if some significant bits and pieces wound up on the cutting room floor."

Stratton's co-host Margaret Pomeranz stated : "It's not badly directed, it's not badly acted. David Ngoomgujarra is a find, he's very charismatic. Unfortunately the film fails to realise the assets it actually has and recklessly discards any likeable character just as they're starting to connect with an audience. This is an Australian film where all sorts of terrific ingredients have not ultimately come together to make any sort of real impact."

== See also ==
- Cinema of Australia
