= Secret Bridesmaids' Business (film) =

2002 TV movie

- Written by: Elizabeth Coleman
- Directed by: Lynn-Maree Danzey
- Starring: Helen Dallimore; Sacha Horler; Rebecca Frith
- Country of origin: Australia
- Original language: English

Production
- Producer: Lynda House
- Cinematography: Brad Shield
- Editor: Mark Atkin

Original release
- Network: ABC
- Release: 9 June 2002

Secret Bridesmaids' Business is a 2002 Australian film based on the play of the same name by Elizabeth Coleman. It was first broadcast of ABC on 9 June 2002.

== Plot ==
Colleen is organising preparations for her daughter's white wedding, but despite her insistence that everything must be perfect, minor problems with every detail upset her equanimity. One of the bridesmaids drops out and Naomi, who has the same dress size, is called on as substitute. Then best friend Lucy confides to bridesmaid Angela of a rumor that Meg's fiancé James has been cheating on her. They argue as to where a friend's responsibility lay: to "keep mum" or tell all and ruin the wedding. They decide to say nothing until the rumor has been confirmed, but Meg senses the tension. To complicate things, there happens to be two imminent weddings where the groom is named James Davis. They play a game of Truth or Dare then share a spa bath. At last the rumor is confirmed and Lucy blurts it out to Meg, who is simultaneously angry at having been told, and that the information has been held back so long.

Then James appears on the scene. Meg confronts him and he denies everything and finally Meg is convinced. He is angry that she doubted him and she is contrite. They make love. Then James is proved to be a liar and she is distraught. He is contrite and humiliates himself in an attempt to regain her trust. At first he claims it was a drunken aberration, a failure of will in a moment of vulnerability. Then it turns out to have been a torrid affair over the period of weeks. Finally, his erstwhile lover is revealed to be Naomi, the substitute bridesmaid.

== Cast ==
- Helen Dallimore as Margaret 'Meg' Louise Bacon
- Vince Colosimo as James William Davis
- Val Lehman as Colleen Bacon
- Rebecca Frith as Angela
- Sacha Horler as Lucy Dean
- Alice McConnell as Naomi Bartlet

== Production ==
The movie was shot on film instead of using video over a period of three weeks beginning in November 2001. Filming took place in ABC's Elsternwick studios.

== Awards ==
- 2002 Australian Film Institute Awards
  - Best Actress in a Supporting or Guest Role in a Television Drama - Rebecca Frith - nominated
  - Best Actress in a Supporting or Guest Role in a Television Drama - Sacha Horler - nominated
  - Best Telefeature or Mini-Series - Lynda House - nominated
