= Stuart Bocking =

Australian radio presenter (born 1969)

- Born: 17 June 1969 (age 56); Sydney, Australia
- Education: Newington College; Macquarie University; Australian Film Television and Radio School
- Occupation: Radio presenter
- Employers: Power FM; Coast Rock FM; 2GB; 2WS; 2UE (1996–2017)

Stuart Lyndon Bocking (born 17 June 1969) is an Australian former radio presenter.

== Early life and education ==
He attended Newington College (1981–1986) and after completing the Higher School Certificate obtained a Bachelor of Economics degree from Macquarie University.

He later undertook the full-time commercial radio course at the Australian Film Television and Radio School.

== Radio career ==
In 1991, Bocking started radio work on the 7pm to midnight shift at Power FM in Nowra on the New South Wales south coast. When he moved north to Coast Rock FM in Gosford, New South Wales he started presenting music and news. Bocking then returned to Sydney and had newsroom positions at 2GB and 2WS. He commenced at 2UE in July 1996. In his early career at 2UE he was the executive producer for John Laws in the 9AM – 12noon shift, with an on-air role as well, as "The Co-Driver" with Laws before being given his own shift under his own name. When John Laws retired from 2UE at the end of 2007, Bocking was briefly considered as a replacement in the shift but lost out to Steve Price who was transferred from Southern Cross Broadcasting's network station 3AW in Melbourne in 2002 (initially to replace Alan Jones after his move to 2GB) where he was top rating and had his own column in the Herald Sun. After Steve Price left 2UE at the end of 2009 to join MTR – the new talk station in Melbourne half owned by the owners of 2GB – Bocking was brought in to do the 9AM – 12noon shift on 2UE. Following a change at the station, Stuart was taken off air to work as a producer for Ray Hadley's morning program on 2GB. Bocking left the Hadley program and 2GB in December 2016.
