= Colleen Clifford =

Australian actress (1898–1996)

- Colleen Clifford - Actress and theatre entrepreneur
- Born: Irene Margaret Blackford; 17 November 1898; Taunton, Somerset, England
- Died: 7 April 1996 (aged 97); Edgecliff, Sydney, Australia
- Other name: Colleen Blackford
- Occupations: Actress; dancer; comedian; singer; theatre director, producer and owner; classical pianist; elocution, music and drama teacher
- Awards: John Campbell Fellowship; 1992

Colleen Clifford (born as Irene Margaret Blackford; 17 November 1898 – 7 April 1996), was a British-born performer, who worked in her native England as well as New Zealand and, later in her career, Australia. As an actress she worked in all facets of the industry: radio, stage, television and film.

She was also a theatre founder, director and producer, coloratura soprano, dancer, comedian and classical pianist who was a specialist in voice production, drama and music. She worked variously as a commercial advertiser, spokeswoman and charity worker and released her own memoirs. She trained many Australian actors such as Judy Nunn, Paula Duncan and Melissa George.

Clifford started her career in her native United Kingdom where she was an early radio and television performer for the British Broadcasting Corporation during the 1930s and 1940s hosting cabaret and variety shows, and appearing in West End theatre and during the Second World War, becoming a feature of news broadcasting and war concerts. Clifford was, at one time, featured on a 15-minute radio show showcasing her singing and musical performances. She emigrated to Australia in 1954, and from 1955 became a highly recognisable character actress of stage, television and films, from the early 1970s in soap operas, series, mini-series, telemovies and theatrical features, often portraying eccentric elderly women. She was a grand dame and matriarch of the arts and entertainment industry. She appeared in her last role at 93 years of age and as such, alongside Olga Dickie and Queenie Ashton was one of the oldest working actors in Australia, although on a small scale with guest appearances and cameos rather than major long-term roles. she died aged 97.

== Biography ==
=== Early life and career in England ===
Born in Taunton, Somerset, England as Irene Margaret Blackford to an English-born mother and George Taunton Constable Clifford, a Major in the British army, who served in his regiment worldwide including France and Belgium, at which time Clifford was raised by an aunt in London. She had two brothers. Her paternal grandfather from Somerset also served in the army as a Major and was a recipient of the VC, her paternal youngest uncle, Ned was killed in the Boer War. Clifford although based in London, lived in various parts of England including Farnham, Stropeshire, Surrey, Kensington and Cornwall, as well as New Zealand during her childhood, where her father worked as a cadet on a stock station in Masterton, before purchasing a run in Taranaki. She studied classical piano in Belgium at the Brussels Conservatoire, before receiving a scholarship to the Royal Academy in London, but stating musical theatre was favoured more, she curtailed a musical career, to become active in British theatre as a stage performer for almost thirty years, starting with a production of Hubert Henry Davies, The Mollusc. She emigrated to Perth, Australia in 1954, after the death of her husband who was a Major in The Royal Air Force.

== Career in Australia ==
=== Theatre career ===
She continued her theatrical career after emigrating to Australia, where she founded the Perth Theatre Guild and Drama School and as a side project taught voice production, drama and music, where throughout the next fifteen years she help develop and train talent for the theatre. She staged six successful musicals using entirely local talent and without importing professional actors. These included stage productions of Annie Get Your Gun (1959), starring Leone Martin Smith in the title role, Oklahoma (1961) and South Pacific (1962) at His Majesty's Theatre, Perth. She moved to Sydney in 1969, where she appeared often at the Old Tote Theatre in theatre roles, including "A Nightingale Still At It"

Having moved from Perth to Sydney and remaining appearing in theatre roles, she began appearing in plays for the Australian Broadcasting Corporation and taking on regular television and film roles.

While touring in New Zealand in 1972, Clifford fell ill and was unable to perform for the first few shows. Being under a "no play, no pay" policy with the theatre company, meaning payment would be withheld from an actor during an illness, she was forced to remain in her Wellington apartment with no means of support. Clifford was then in her late 70s and, with rent money and doctor bills piling up, Michael Craig, and Honor Blackman and other members of the company raised enough money to financially support Clifford until she was well enough to rejoin the cast.

She returned to the theatre in 1990, at the age of 92, in the latest version of her one-woman show A Nightingale Still at It in Berkeley Square. She was awarded the John Campbell Fellowship for her contribution to theatre two years later.

=== Television roles ===
Clifford became a highly recognisable actress in her latter years, appearing in everything from soap opera, miniseries, telemovies, and films. She made her television acting debut in 1971 as a guest star in the series Dynasty (not related to the American production) and The Godfathers in 1971.

In 1978, she guest-starred in the legal drama Case for the Defence. A year later, she appeared in the popular series Prisoner (also known as Prisoner: Cell Block H) in a brief but memorable role as Edie Wharton, an elderly woman imprisoned for vagrancy. That same year, she made another guest appearance on another soap opera the Nine Network series The Young Doctors. She took a three-year absence to return to the theatre full-time but, then in 1981, began playing the guest role of Miss Bird on A Country Practice. She appeared in supporting roles including the sitcom Mother and Son and Five Mile Creek throughout the 1980s.

She returned to the serial A Country Practice between 1990 and 1993, playing two different roles: Freda Spinner and Mrs. Grainger.

=== Films ===
She started to feature in small roles in films from the 1980s onwards, firstly the historical drama film Careful, He Might Hear You (1983). She spent the next decade starring in a variety of supporting roles in film. These included Where the Green Ants Dream (1984), The Coca-Cola Kid (1985), Double Sculls (1986), The Year My Voice Broke (1987) and Barracuda (1988).

She starred in films This Won't Hurt a Bit and Frauds (both 1993).

== Later life, death and legacy ==
Clifford suffered a heart attack in 1995, and was fitted with a pacemaker. She died in Sydney on 7 April 1996, at the age of 97.

After her death, the Sydney theatre-lovers group The Glugs named one of their awards after her, the Colleen Clifford Memorial Award Outstanding Performance in a Musical or Special Comedy Satire. The inaugural 1997 award was won by Angela Toohey and Paul Goddard for their roles in Cabaret.

== Filmography ==
Clifford had a long career in England, particularly in theatre before emigrating to Australia in 1954; the following documents her Australian credits only, where Clifford had a successful career in television and films as an actress and also appeared in theatre, as well as was a theatre director and teacher in Australia. She made her stage debut in 1955 and her screen debut in 1959 in TV series Spotlight, the first production in Western Australia, and her final film appearance in 1993.

=== Film ===
Year	Title	Role	Type
1983	Careful, He Might Hear You	Ettie	Feature film
1984	Where the Green Ants Dream	Miss Strehlow	Feature film
1985	The Coca-Cola Kid	Mrs. Haversham	Feature film
1987	The Year My Voice Broke	Gran Olson	Feature film
1992	Frauds	Mrs. Waterson	Feature film
1993	Shotgun Wedding	Voice	Feature film
1993	This Won't Hurt a Bit	Lady Smith	Feature film

=== Television ===
Year	Title	Role	Type
1959	Spotlight	Guest performer	TV series
1970	Dynasty	Guest role: Mrs. Palmer	TV series, 1 episode
1971	The Godfathers	Guest role: Miss Lovelace	TV series, 2 episodes
1975	Behind the Legend	Guest role: Mrs. Aeneas Gunn	TV series, 1 episode
1978	Case for the Defence	Guest role: Catriona Smith	TV series, 1 episode
1979	Prisoner	Recurring role: Edie Wharton	TV series, 6 episodes
1979	The Young Doctors	Guest role: Agnes Brewer	TV series
1981–1993	A Country Practice	Guest roles: Miss Bird / Freda Spinner / Miss. Bird / Mrs. Grainger	TV series, 18 episodes
1982	1915	Guest role: Mrs. Stinson	TV miniseries, 1 episode
1984	Mother And Son	Guest role: Old Lady	TV series, 1 episode
1984	Five Mile Creek	Guest role: Mrs. Watkins	TV series, 1 episode
1984	Sweet and Sour	Guest role: Mrs. Green	TV series, 1 episode
1985	Double Sculls	Mrs. Fenwick	TV film
1987	Olive	Mrs. Lawson	TV film
1987–1988	Rafferty's Rules	Recurring guest role: Mrs. Murdoch	TV series, 2 episodes
1988	Barracuda	Mrs. Hennessey	TV film
1989	In Melbourne Today	Guest	TV series, 1 episode
1994	Good Morning Australia	Guest	TV series, 1 episode
1994	At Home	Guest	TV series, 1 episode
1994	TVTV	Guest (with The Young Doctors cast)	TV series, 1 episode
