= A Wedding in Ramallah =

2002 documentary film

- Directed by: Sherine Salama
- Written by: Sherine Salama
- Produced by: Sherine Salama
- Narrated by: Sherine Salama
- Cinematography: Sherine Salama
- Edited by: Andrew Arestides; Andrea Lang
- Release date: 2002
- Running time: 90 minutes
- Country: Australia
- Languages: English, Arabic

A Wedding in Ramallah is a 2002 Australian documentary film, created by Sherine Salama, based around an American-based Palestinian man's marriage to a traditional Palestinian young woman.

== Production ==
A Wedding in Ramallah was filmed in Palestine and the United States of America over a period of nine months.

== Reception ==
Paul Byrnes wrote in the Sydney Morning Herald that it "is an intriguing film - mysterious and playful, dramatic and emotional, but also careful about not abusing a trust. Salama has the ability to remain personally involved as she films. Detachment was never an honest stance for a film-maker, anyway." Writing in Variety David Stratton says "It’s a sad but probably typical story, and it’s beautifully handled by director Salama, who evidently formed a close bond with her subjects, especially the women. In a film full of humor, the viewer is never allowed to forget the tragic subtext." Samantha Bonar of The Los Angeles Times finishes "This look at the intimate side of Palestinian life, both in the Middle East and here, is fascinating but not pleasant. Salama’s film illuminates a culture that appears maddeningly misogynistic. Hoping for a new life after her wedding in Ramallah, this bride instead got a dead-end."

== Awards ==
- 2002 Australian Film Institute Awards
  - Best Documentary - Sherine Salama - won
  - Best Direction in a Documentary - Sherine Salama - won
