= Rebecca Frith =

Australian actress

- Born: Queensland, Australia
- Education: National Institute of Dramatic Art (1987)
- Occupation: Actress
- Years active: 1987–2011
- Notable work: Love Serenade (1996); Secret Bridesmaids' Business (2002)

Rebecca Frith is an Australian retired actress.

== Early life and education ==
Frith studied at Sydney's National Institute of Dramatic Art (NIDA), graduating with a Bachelor of Dramatic Art (Acting) in 1987.

== Career ==
Frith has appeared in several films, most notably, 1996 quirky comedy Love Serenade, alongside Miranda Otto, in which she played Vicki-Ann Hurley, one of the three lead characters. She also starred in 2002 ABC television film Secret Bridesmaids' Business, based on the play of the same name by Elizabeth Coleman. For her performance in the latter, she was nominated for the 2002 Australian Film Institute Award for Best Actress in a Supporting or Guest Role in a Television Drama.

Further film credits include mystery thriller The Missing (1999), romantic comedy Me Myself I (1999) with Rachel Griffiths, drama A Wreck A Tangle (2000), romantic comedy Russian Doll (2001) opposite Hugo Weaving and David Wenham, and comedy A Man's Gotta Do (2004).

Frith's television credits include the 1989 TV movie Malpractice and the 2004 crime miniseries Through My Eyes (based on the Lindy Chamberlain case and the disappearance of Azaria Chamberlain) and recurring guest roles in medical defence series MDA (2003) and teen drama SLiDE (2011). She has also made guest appearances in medical dramas The Flying Doctors (1991), A Country Practice (1991; 1993) and G.P. (1995), anthology series Six Pack (1992), drama Law of the Land (1994) and police procedural series Water Rats (1999).

Frith has also appeared on stage in numerous productions for some of Australia's major theatre companies including Sydney Theatre Company, Queensland Theatre, Belvoir, Griffin Theatre Company and NIDA. Her credits include playing Juliet in Romeo and Juliet (1989), Hermia in A Midsummer Night's Dream (1989), Natasha in Three Sisters (1990), Olivia in Twelfth Night (1991), Leura in Blue Murder (1994), Abigail Williams in The Crucible (1994).

Frith is also a voiceover artist, having voiced television commercials for the likes of the Queensland Women's State of Origin team, a Queensland Government smoke alarms safety campaign and Wellgrove Olive Leaf Extract.

== Awards and nominations ==
Year	Work	Award	Category	Result	Ref.
2002	Secret Bridesmaids' Business	Australian Film Institute Awards	Best Actress in a Supporting or Guest Role in a Television Drama	Nominated	

== Personal life ==
Frith is based in Brisbane, Queensland, Australia.

== Filmography ==
=== Film ===
Year	Title	Role	Notes	Ref
1996	Love Serenade	Vicki-Ann Hurley		
1998	Fetch	Girl	Short film	
1999	Me Myself I	Terri		
1999	Strange Planet	Amanda		
1999	The Missing	Susan		
2000	A Wreck A Tangle	Rita		
2000	Human Touch	Desiree	Short film	
2001	Russian Doll	Miriam		
2003	Violet Lives Upstairs	Violet	Short film	
2004	A Man's Gotta Do	Yvonne		
2007	Corroboree	Dr Elsja		

=== Television ===
Year	Title	Role	Notes	Ref
1989	Malpractice	Sister Pam Elliot	TV movie	
1991	The Flying Doctors	Gail Ramsay	1 episode	
1991; 1993	A Country Practice	Denise Scott / Lois West	4 episodes	
1992	Six Pack	Sharon	Anthology series, 1 episode	
1994	Law of the Land	Alex Lentini	1 episode	
1995	G.P.	Ruth Taylor	2 episodes	
1999	Water Rats	Rebecca Solomon	1 episode	
2002	Secret Bridesmaids' Business	Angela	TV movie	
2003	MDA	Fran Griffin	3 episodes	
2004	Through My Eyes	Robertson	Miniseries, 2 episodes	
2011	SLiDE	Rebecca	4 episodes	

== Theatre ==
Year	Title	Role	Notes
1987	As You Like It	Phebe / A Lord (at court)	NIDA Parade Theatre, Sydney
1987	Under a Weeping Sky		NIDA Parade Theatre, Sydney
1987	The Big Shiny Frock Show		NIDA Parade Theatre, Sydney
1987	A Journey Through Peer Gynt		NIDA Parade Theatre, Sydney
1987	Don Juan Comes Back from the War	Maid / Actress / Brunette / Landlady	NIDA Parade Theatre, Sydney
1988	The Kid	Desiree	Stables Theatre, Sydney with Griffin Theatre Company
1988	Ghosts	Regine	Belvoir St Theatre, Sydney
1988	Cowgirls and Indians		NIDA Parade Theatre, Sydney
1988	Conversations with Jesus		NIDA Parade Theatre, Sydney, Cremorne Theatre, Brisbane
1989	Romeo and Juliet	Juliet	Sydney Opera House with STC
1989	A Midsummer Night's Dream	Hermia	Sydney Opera House with STC
1990	Three Sisters	Natasha	Sydney Opera House with STC
1991	Twelfth Night	Olivia	Q Theatre, Penrith
1992	The Rain Dancers		Wharf Theatre, Sydney with STC
1992	The Real Live Brady Bunch		University of Sydney
1993	A Flea in Her Ear		NIDA Parade Theatre, Sydney
1994	Blue Murder	Leura	Belvoir Theatre, Sydney
1994	The Crucible	Abigail Williams	Monash University, Melbourne, Riverside Theatres Parramatta, His Majesty's Theatre, Perth with STC
2000	Chilling & Killing My Annabel Lee		Cremorne Theatre, Brisbane with QTC
2002	Much Ado About Nothing		Christ Church Cathedral, Grafton, Southern Cross University, Lismore with Railway Street Theatre Company & NORPA
