= Doing Time for Patsy Cline =

- Directed by: Chris Kennedy
- Produced by: Chris Kennedy; John Winter
- Starring: Miranda Otto; Richard Roxburgh; Matt Day
- Edited by: Ken Sallows
- Music by: Peter Best
- Distributed by: Cowboy Booking(USA); Dendy Films(Australia); Southern Star Group Film(International)
- Release dates: 5 September 1997 (Toronto International Film Festival); 25 September 1997 (Australia)
- Running time: 95 minutes
- Country: Australia
- Language: English
- Box office: US$940,000

Doing Time for Patsy Cline is a 1997 Australian film starring Miranda Otto, Richard Roxburgh, and Matt Day, and directed by Chris Kennedy.

== Plot ==
Following a passion for country music, Ralph leaves his father's sheep farm in a remote Australian town, armed with a guitar and a plane ticket to Nashville, Tennessee. He hopes to hitchhike to Sydney Airport where his take-off into a successful country/western singing career will hopefully begin. However, fate and his naivety find him hitchhiking with a psychotic drug thief named Boyd, and Boyd's mesmerising girlfriend, Patsy. The plot then splits into a series of parallels, flash forwards and flashbacks. One depicts Ralph's imprisonment after being framed for drug trafficking. The other follows the dramatic ascent of his career to hype status and the pairing between the dynamic Patsy and himself. Both paths eventually lead him home, with Ralph consequently being more mature and adjusted, and with a bag full of experiences.

== Cast ==
Actor/Actress	Character
Miranda Otto	Patsy
Richard Roxburgh	Boyd
Matt Day	Ralph
Tony Barry	Dwayne
Roy Billing	Dad
Annie Byron	Mum
Colette Brus	Waitress
Laurence Coy	Alfie
Tom Long	Brad Goodall
Gus Mercurio	Tyrone
Wayne Pygram	Geoff Spinks
Kiri Paramore	Ken
Jeff Truman	Warren
Shayne Francis	TV reporter
Tyler Coppin	Bobby Joe
Betty Bobbitt	Connie

== Reception ==
=== Box office ===
Doing Time for Patsy Cline grossed $671,639 at the box office in Australia, which is equivalent to £710,760.53 or US$940,295, in 2009.

=== Reviews ===
The film received generally positive reviews. The New York Times criticized the film's editing and "jarring leaps in time", but praised the film's performances, especially that of Roxburgh.

=== Awards ===
The film received many award nominations including ten AFI Award nominations for 1997. It won an Australian Writer's Guild Award for Best Original Screenplay. The film won four Australian Film Institute Awards including Best Actor, Best Cinematography, Best Original Music Score, and Best Costume Design. It also won an award of distinction for production design. It won three Australian Film Critics' Awards, including Best Actor, Best Musical Score and Best Cinematography. It also won a San Diego Film Festival Award for Best Original Script and a Melbourne International Film Festival Award for Most Popular Australian Film.

== See also ==
- Patsy Cline
