= Glass (1989 film) =

Film by Chris Kennedy

- Directed by: Chris Kennedy
- Written by: Chris Kennedy
- Produced by: Patrick Fitzgerald; Chris Kennedy
- Starring: Lisa Peers; Natalie McCurry
- Cinematography: Pieter de Vries
- Edited by: James Bradley
- Production company: Oilrag Productions
- Release date: 1989
- Running time: 92 minutes
- Country: Australia
- Language: English

Glass is a 1989 Australian erotic thriller which was the feature debut of Chris Kennedy.

== Cast ==
- Alan Lovell as Richard Vickery
- Lisa Peers as Julie Vickery
- Adam Stone as Peter Breen
- Natalie McCurry as Alison Baume
- Julie Herbert as Brenda Fairfax
- Bernard Clisby as Inspector Ambrosoll
- Richard Gilbert as Reg
- Marilyn Thomas as Alice

== Production ==
Chris Kennedy made the movie shortly after leaving film school:

I had an Irish friend who considered himself a bit of a film producer and I considered myself a film writer and director and producer, so I went to the bank and talked them into giving us the money to make Glass, on the understanding that we would be able to recoup the money... They didn't know any better and I didn't know any better. So we went ahead and made the film. Essentially Glass was made with a view to selling it effectively. It was made to be something that you could turn the sound off in Iceland and still get a pretty good idea of what's going on. Apart from other things, apart from being a terrific learning curve for me, it was really making movies on the job without ever having made a movie. No-one at the top end of the cast or crew had ever made a feature film before, and I was the blind leading the blind.

== Reception ==
According to Kennedy the film sold very well overseas and recouped a fair amount of its budget. The director calls it "a bit of a raw and amateurish effort, but there are bits and pieces of it I quite like."
