= A Wreck A Tangle =

Australian film

- Directed by: Scott Patterson
- Written by: John O'Brien
- Produced by: Frank Haines; Rachel Knowles; Nicki Roller
- Starring: Anna Lise Phillips; Damian Walshe-Howling; Rebecca Frith
- Edited by: Shawn Seet
- Music by: Vincent Giarrusso
- Distributed by: Beyond Distribution
- Release date: 2000
- Running time: 85 minutes
- Country: Australia
- Language: English

A Wreck A Tangle is a 2000 Australian film directed by Scott Patterson starring Anna Lise Phillips, Damian Walshe-Howling and Rebecca Frith.

== Synopsis ==
A drug-addicted couple run their stolen car into another couple and end up staying with them. They are initially there for a night and then a week – before eventually outstaying their welcome.

== Cast ==
- Anna Lise Phillips as Max
- Damian Walshe-Howling as Benjamin
- Rebecca Frith as Rita
- Nick Jasprizza as Orson
- Susan Prior as Eleanor
- Peter Carroll as Science Voiceover
- Stephen Leeder as Pianist
- Kate Beahan as Kinch's girlfriend

== Production ==
Along with Fresh Air and Bored Olives (aka City Loop), the film was part of the Australian Film Commission-sponsored SBS 'Million Dollar Movies' program.

== Awards ==
Year	Award	Category	Result	Ref.
1999	AWGIE Award	Best Feature Film – Original	Won	
2000	Australian Film Institute Award	Best Achievement in Sound	Nominated	
