= Peter Tammer =

- Born: Melbourne, Australia
- Occupation: Film director
- Years active: 1964–present

Peter Julian Tammer (b. February 26, 1943) is an Australian film director, and a former lecturer on film at Swinburne Film and Television School and later at its successor at the Victorian College of the Arts.

== Career ==
Peter Julian Tammer (b. February 26, 1943) began working in the film industry when he was 19 years old, in 1962. He worked as a film editor for film companies such as Eltham Films, with Tim Burstall, and later for government organisations such as the Commonwealth Film Unit. He started creating his own independent short films in 1964, such as And He Shall Rise Again (1964, 15 mins) and Beethoven and all that Jazz (1964, 2 mins). Through the 1960s, he connected with other Melbourne independent filmmakers such as Nigel Buesst, Tom Cowan, and Paul Cox.

Together with his wife Monique, Tammer put together a very early programme of independent short films called "A Breath of Fresh Air". In the early 1970s, Tammer was a founding member of the Melbourne Film-maker's Co-op, an important group for independent filmmakers in Melbourne at the time. He was associated with other filmmakers such as Jim Wilson, Fred Harden, Bert Deling, James Clayden, many of whom were now showing films at the Piencotheca Gallery, a precursor to the Melbourne Film Co-op. He also had a productive association with Gary Patterson in the mid 1970s, for the films Here's To You, Mr. Robinson (1976, 52 mins) and How Willingly You Sing (1977, 90 mins, directed by Patterson, with cinematography by Tammer).

Tammer's teaching career began in 1973, when he was appointed a tutor in a film course at Melbourne State College in Carlton. In 1979, he was appointed lecturer in film at the Swinburne Film and Television School. Among his students were Paul Goldman, Chris Kennedy John Hillcoat, and Evan English, dubbed the "Gang of Four" by Nigel Buesst owing to their pranks, one of which involved "kidnapping a frozen chicken" from Tammer's fridge.

In 1986, Tammer was appointed senior lecturer in Film, and in 1992 the Film and Television School transferred to the Victorian College of the Arts (VCA). At the VCA Tammer delivered the newly-created Graduate Diploma of Film and Television Documentary stream. Tammer was an inspirational teacher for many of the students, and he retired from the VCA in 1998.

Tammer continued making his own independent films all through this time, producing a series of award-winning films in the 1980s, including Mallacoota Stampede (1981, 60 mins), Journey to the End of Night (1982, 70 mins), and Hey Marcel ... (1984, 17 mins). A cherished project on the film scholar and actor John Flaus, entitled Flausfilm, was begun in 1988 and finally completed in 2009.

== Filmography ==
Titles directed by Peter Tammer:

- And He Shall Rise Again (1964, 15 mins, 16mm, Narrative)
- On The Ball (1964, 4 mins, 16mm, Experimental)
- Beethoven and all that Jazz (1964, 2 mins, 16mm, Experimental)
- Pisces Dying (1966, 15 mins, 16mm, Narrative)
- Our Luke (1970, 10 mins, 16mm, Experimental)
- Journey to a Broken Heart (1970, 50 mins, 16mm, Doco)
- Flux (1970, 40 mins, 16mm, Experimental)
- A Woman of our Time (1972, 26 mins, 16mm, Biog. Doco)
- The Curse of Laradjongran (1972, 30 mins, 16mm, Doco)(Co-production With Monique Schwarz)
- Struttin' the Mutton (1975, 17 mins, 16mm, Observational)
- Here's To You, Mr. Robinson (1976, 52 mins, 16mm, Biog. Doco)(Co-Production With Garry Patterson)
- Mallacoota Stampede (1981, 60 mins, 16mm, Narrative)
- Journey to the End of Night (1982, 70 mins, 16mm, Biog. Doco)
- My Belle (1983, 20 mins, 16mm, Portrait)
- Hey Marcel... (1984, 17 mins, 16mm, Experimental)
- Queen of the Night (1985, 20 mins, 35mm, Experimental.)

(note: these three above films are gathered as "Triptych")

- Fear of the Dark (1985, 59 mins, 16mm, Doco/Narrative)
- Hi Jim (1990, 20 mins, S/VHS)
- Flausfilm (2009, 99 mins, video) Filmed between 1988 and 1991. Completed in 2009.
- The Nude in the Window (2014, 61 mins, Doco)
- Chauvet Cave (2014, 3 mins)
- Lascaux Cave (2014, 2 mins)
- Munch: The Sick Child (2014, 3 mins)
- Janet Cumbrae Stewart (2014, 2 mins)
- 3 Panels (2023, 3 mins)
- A Tree for Ukraine ... From Kyneton With Love! (2023, 3 mins)
- Trip of a Lifetime (2025, 76 mins)

== Awards ==
- Best Editing, A.F.I. Awards, 1969 - And Then There was Glass
- "Honourable Mention", A.F.I. Awards, 1977 - Here's to you, Mr. Robinson
- "ERWIN RADO" Prize, For Best Short Film, Melbourne Film Festival 1981 - Mallacoota Stampede
- "TEN AWARD" For Documentary Excellence, Melbourne Film Festival 1982 - Journey to the End of Night
- "JURY PRIZE", A.F.I. Awards, 1982 - Journey to the End of Night
- Finalist Greater Union Awards, Sydney Film Festival,1984 - Hey Marcel ...
- Finalist Greater Union Awards, Sydney Film Festival,1986 - Queen of the Night
- Finalist, TOKYO Video Festival, "Video-Letter" Competition, Minor Prize - Hi Jim
