= Walking on Water (2002 film) =

- Directed by: Tony Ayres
- Written by: Roger Monk
- Produced by: Liz Watts
- Cinematography: Robert Humphreys
- Edited by: Reva Childs
- Music by: Antony Partos
- Release dates: 10 February 2002 (Berlin); 26 September 2002
- Running time: 90 minutes
- Country: Australia
- Language: English

Walking on Water is a 2002 Australian drama film directed by Tony Ayres. The film explores the grief, tenderness, stupidity and humour that arises from death.

== Plot summary ==
When Gavin is finally buried after dying of AIDS, his close friends Charlie and Anna find themselves at odds regarding the way he died. In the weekend that passes, Gavin's estranged family come to stay, which only adds more tension to the strained household. As Charlie tries to cling to his distant partner Frank, and Anna begins a sexual affair with Gavin's married brother, the pair realize now that Gavin has gone and there is no one to keep them together, or even keep them in line.

== Cast ==
- Vince Colosimo as Charlie
- Maria Theodorakis as Anna
- Nathaniel Dean as Simon
- Judi Farr as Margaret
- Nicholas Bishop as Frank
- David Bonney as Gavin
- Danny Roberts as Carl
- Anna Lise Phillips as Kate
- Celeste Jones as Martha
- Maureen Green as Robyn
- Timothy Jones as Dr. Simms
- Antonietta Morgillo as Florist
- Mark Baker as Joey
- Jillian O'Dowd as Crying Girl
- Lachlan Chapman as Dr. Simms' Boyfriend

== Awards ==
Walking on Water won five Australian Film Institute awards and the Teddy Award for Best Feature Film at the 2002 Berlin International Film Festival.

== Box office ==
Walking on Water grossed A$350,532 at the box office in Australia.

== See also ==
- Cinema of Australia
