= All Saints season 5 =

All Saints
- Season 5
- Season 5 cast
- No. of episodes: 43

Release
- Original network: Seven Network
- Original release: 5 February – 26 November 2002

Season chronology
- ← Previous; Season 4 Next → Season 6

The fifth season of the long-running Australian medical drama All Saints began airing on 5 February 2002 and concluded on 26 November 2002 with a total of 43 episodes.

== Plot ==
2002 begins with a bang as an earthquake rips through Sydney, causing Von to fracture her arm and a train derailment. When Ben, Rebecca, and Scott arrive at the scene, they are horrified to discover Bron and Lyle among the victims.

Nelson reveals that he is an alcoholic to one of his patients before attending Alcoholics Anonymous meetings while Paula lets drop that she has a son. Rumours circle around Ward 17 that Von is sleeping with one of her patients, and later that both Terri & Mitch and Scott & Matt are having illicit affairs. Bron leaves the Ward for London for ten weeks, while wonder-doc Charlotte Beaumont joins the medical team, firstly helping with an Ebola patient.

The second half of the year commences with Terri revealing the bombshell the Ward has been waiting to hear: she is pregnant with Mitch's child, but tragedy soon strikes putting both mother and child in grave danger. Jared is forced to deal with terrible memories after he is raped by a drug-addled psychopath and Von must help Jared when he discovers he has contracted gonorrhea. Bron informs Ben that she had an affair in London and they break up, forcing Ben into the arms of Paula. In a bid to make Ben jealous, Bron sleeps with Charlotte.

The year comes to a conclusion with Mitch popping the question, Bron & Ben back together, and Paula & Luke developing feelings for one another.

== Cast ==
=== Main ===
- Georgie Parker as Terri Sullivan
- Conrad Coleby as Scott Zinenko
- Martin Lynes as Luke Forlano
- Tammy Macintosh as Charlotte Beaumont (24 episodes, from episode 16)
- Judith McGrath as Von Ryan
- Libby Tanner as Bronwyn Craig
- Ben Tari as Jared Levine
- Erik Thomson as Mitch Stevens
- Brian Vriends as Ben Markham

=== Recurring ===
- Jenni Baird as Paula Morgan
- Natasha Beaumont as Rebecca Green (36 episodes)
- Josh Quong Tart as Matt Horner (37 episodes)
- Ling-Hsueh Tang as Kylie Preece (32 episodes)
- Paul Tassone as Nelson Curtis
- Rochelle Whyte as Cara Windom (19 episodes)
- Chris Haywood as Peter Buchanan (13 episodes)
- Richard Wilson as Adam Finch (9 episodes)
- Joy Smithers as Rose Carlton Stevens (8 episodes)
- Jack Rickard as Max Morgan (8 episodes)
- David Downer as Colin Blackburn (7 episodes)
- Celia Ireland as Regina Butcher (4 episodes)

=== Guest ===
- Camilla Ah Kin as Hana Lawson (4 episodes)
- Kate Fischer as Hannah Laughlin (3 episodes)
- Patrick Thompson as Paul Stevens (3 episodes)
- Penne Hackforth-Jones as Dr Nicola Hartley (3 episodes)
- Belinda McClory as Nicola Lewis (2 episodes)
- Robert Coleby as Prof. Richard Craig (2 episodes)
- Rohan Nichol as Aaron Collingwood (2 episodes)
- Genevieve O'Reilly as Leanne Curtis (2 episodes)
- Nick Flint as Angus Drummond (2 episodes)
- Linda Cropper as Anita Murphy (1 episode)
- Ben Barrack as Vincent Soames (1 episode)
- Andrea Moor as Liz Thomas (1 episode)
- Victoria Longley as Margaret O'Brien (1 episode)

== Episodes ==
No. overall	No. in season	Title	Directed by	Written by	Original release date
169	1	Opening Night	Peter Fisk	Louise Crane	5 February 2002
Tensions run high after an earthquake rocks All Saints. Bron and Lyle are on their way to his opening night, when the train that they are on jackknifes and after Bron is removed and taken to All Saints, a gas leak triggers an explosion, leaving Lyle in grave danger. Scott bonds with a woman caught in between two trains. Von fractures her wrist in an elevator collapse. Matt has trouble taking care of all the paperwork. Kylie becomes sensitive around a patient and her young daughter.
170	2	The Show Must Go On	Peter Fisk	Louise Crane	12 February 2002
Luke is forced to amputate a man's leg to remove him from the train wreckage but his career is in danger after his hand is crushed. Paula reunites a father and son with each other after the earthquake. Kylie breaks down after a young girl reminds her of her mother. Scott and Rebecca butt heads over the treatment of the train crash victims but later succumb to their tension and have sex. Mitch and Terri are forced to operate on Lyle on the Ward and are both horrified when he suddenly goes into cardiac arrest and dies. Terri tells Mitch that she loves him and they kiss.
171	3	"In the Lap of the Gods"	Scott Feeney	Jenny Lewis & Lesley Lewis	19 February 2002
Scott and Ben are called out to an overdose involving a child, but Ben breaks protocol and sticks his neck out for the child's mother. Luke tries to talk a patient out of surgery when he discovers she hasn't been informed of all the facts. Kylie and Jared's relationship hits rocky ground. Von and Nelson nurse a patient with a rare disease. Paula and Mitch race to save a young victim of the train crash who continues to have spontaneous seizures. Lyle's death finally hits Bron. Nelson reveals to his patient that he is an alcoholic.
172	4	"Slings and Arrows"	Julian Pringle	Denise Morgan	26 February 2002
Jared feels incredibly guilty after his patient, who is suffering from post-partum depression, jumps off a balcony and is nowhere to be found. Terri's management of the Ward is questioned by Joan after she refuses to let her fire Jared. Von takes care of a patient who has blindness due to lupus. Nelson and Luke go head-to-head when he accuses Jared of being medically negligent. Scott, Ben and Rebecca attend an archery field where a couple's jealousy has caused a shoot-out. Von is told her SLE has gone into remission.
173	5	"Private Affairs"	Robert Marchand	Rick Held	5 March 2002
Mitch admits his mother-in-law, Victoria after she complains about chest pain. Von looks after a famous painter whom she knew when she was younger and convinces him to re-invent himself. Scott and Ben are called out to an ice skating rink to treat a bruised wrist, but end up transporting an Olympic athlete with a busted-up knee. Bron decides to take an extended holiday without Ben. Mitch worries that the reason for Victoria's stress is Rose and he convinces her to come with him to visit Rose.
174	6	"Loose Lips"	Peter Fisk	Phil Sanders, Sarah Walker	12 March 2002
Ben and Scott are called out to an MVA and find the driver, Craig, who has relatively minor injuries, in an agitated state. He demands to know why they took so long to get there and is told that the first ambulance was flagged down to another accident.
175	7	"Invisible Things"	Scott Feeney	Philip Dalkin	19 March 2002
Von and Mitch are shocked when their patient reveals his dying secret. he got terminal radiation poisoning from inside All Saints hospital.
176	8	"All Chocked Up"	Julian Pringle	Christina Milligan	26 March 2002
Rising politician Martin Chadwick is admitted to emergency choking on a chicken bone and is quickly taken to theatre, where Kylie assists in his operation. She continues his post-operative care the following day on Ward 17, but it's clear that Martin's wife, Catherine, has no faith in her.
177	9	"Flaws in the Glass"	Robert Marchand	Chris Corbett	2 April 2002
Mitch starts his day with a harrowing but cathartic meeting with Rose, during which they both agree, sadly but amicably, that their marriage is over.
178	10	"Only Human"	Peter Fisk	Sarah Walker	9 April 2002
During a hospital function to woo donations from rich sponsors, wealthy Harry Nixon falls through a glass coffee table and is badly injured - Ben and Scott arrive to find the new CEO, Colin Blackburn, performing emergency first aid. Colin sends Harry to Ward 17, asking Terri to take care of this VIP patient.
179	11	"Chemistry"	Scott Feeney	John Concannon	16 April 2002
Scott and Rebecca attend what seems to be the attempted suicide of an older couple, Henry and Elizabeth Phelan. Henry, a former euthanasia advocate has Alzheimers, but when Elizabeth dies, suspicion is aroused over her "choice" in the couples action.
180	12	"No Respite"	Tina Butler	Sarah Walker	23 April 2002
While getting drunk, playing cards and talking about his chances with Rebecca, Scott passes out on Matt's bed. Though Matt tries to push him off, Scott won't budge. Jared discovers them snoozing cosily together the following morning, and despite knowing it's innocent, decides to torment the pair throughout the day. Matt has a sad reunion with an ex-girlfriend, Anna, who has been beaten severely by her boyfriend while Rebecca decides to save Scott's reputation. Kane Sharpe reappears.
181	13	"Thicker than Water"	Robert Marchand	Denise Morgan	30 April 2002
Paula nurses a haemophilic patient, whose ex-wife accuses him of kidnapping his child from her and her fiancée. Von and Nelson look after a former nurse who refuses to accept the fact that she will eventually have to live on her own. Mitch and Terri have a close call when they run into Joan Marden and her husband while on a date, but they later share a kiss on the Ward. While Kylie and Luke perform a pneumonectomy on a melanoma patient, Jared begins to suspect an affair between the two.
182	14	"Pride and Prejudice"	Sally Webb	Peter Fisk	7 May 2002
Scott and Ben are called out to a man bashed in a vicious attack of homophobia. Nelson nurses a patient with live cancer who clashes with her oncologist. Mitch threatens to quit if his proposal for a detox clinic is knocked back by the hospital board and gets Terri off-side in the process. Von and Jared nurse a patient who believes his ex-girlfriend is a witch and has an incredibly invasive mother. Paula takes care of a young lady, who Paula believes is being subjected to her husband's violent behaviour.
183	15	"Overload"	Scott Feeney	John Banas	14 May 2002
Jared begins a downward spiral after his patient dies during an operation with Luke and then, tenders his resignation – effective immediately. Paula has trouble dealing with an older nurse, and is then shocked when Mitch accuses her of negligence. Nelson and the other nurses of Ward 17 threaten to go on strike if they are not listened to. Mitch looks after a young patient who is mistakenly given methadone to fix an addiction. Rebecca reveals that she used to be a nurse.
184	16	"Swept Away"	Julian Pringle	Christina Milligan	21 May 2002
Charlotte Beaumont arrives on Ward 17 and is immediately thrown in the deep end when she is forced to treat a suspected case of Ebola with Mitch. Kylie and Nelson work on a patient who comes in with a broken nose that will not stop bleeding. Terri and Von nurse an elderly woman whose husband is in the hospital with a terminal illness. After it is confirmed that the quarantined patient has Dengue Fever, Terri and Mitch bite the bullet and finally consummate their relationship. First appearance of Tammy Macintosh as Charlotte Beaumont
185	17	"All the Right Reasons"	Robert Marchand	Ted Roberts	28 May 2002
Bron returns, from her extended overseas holiday, to an empty house. Ben and Rebecca are called out to an industrial incident and must save a man's life and deliver a baby. Terri calls in sick to spend the day with Mitch, but Victoria's arrival puts a dampener on their day. Nelson steps in as nursing unit manager. Von steps in to help a co-worker, but when she makes a mistake, she puts her career, and a patient's life, at risk.
186	18	"Coming Clean"	Peter Fisk	Philip Dalkin	4 June 2002
Luke and Nelson work on a patient from the Northern Territory who impales himself with nail, and decides to pull it out himself. The staff of Ward 17 learn that there is a new inquiry into the death of Ma O'Connell. Jared informs his housemates that he has a job interview, but Bron discovers he's hiding something. Mitch works on a teenage girl who arrives in Emergency, suffering from abdominal pain, and is later found out to be her own mother's patient.
187	19	"Shame"	Scott Feeney	Rick Held	11 June 2002
Luke's medical reputation is under threat when the inquest into Ma O'Connell's death reveals Luke's involvement in her euthanasia. Paula and Mitch work on the wife of Don Murphy and must deal with their marital problems. A patient discovers that she is adopted, causing Kylie to struggle with her own personal demons. Bron reveals that she cheated on Ben. Mitch's detox clinic proposal is granted and is told he won't be getting his daughter back.
188	20	"White Noise"	Frank Arnold	John Concannon	18 June 2002
Von's chaperoning of an underprivileged teenager getaway turns awry when two of the teens are lost and she is forced to abseil down a cliff. Mitch is refused entry into his house by Rose's new fling, Vincent Soames. Kylie tries to support Jared when he receives a sales job at the hospital. Nelson gets a patient offside when he tells Luke about his plans. Bron nurses a mentally ill patient who is the cause of his parents' marital problems.
189	21	"Personal Matters"	Robert Marchand	Grant Fraser & Sarah Walker	25 June 2002
Paula is horrified to learn that her mother and son Max have been involved in a car accident, but even more when she discovers that she's had a morphine overdose. Bron is stuck between a rock and a hard place when she tackles whether or not to tell Ben about her infidelity. Jared enquires about the nursing position in the rapid detox clinic. Rebecca decides to quit the ambulance force after jeopardising a patient's life.
190	22	"M for Memory"	Peter Fisk	Peter Gawler	2 July 2002
Charlotte replaces Mitch on the Ward and she and Bron work together to figure out the medical mystery behind a patient and his younger sister. Mitch's cousin, Paul and his partner arrive for the opening of the clinic, and enquire about their fertility problems. The Rapid Detox Clinic opens. A fault in the heating system causes problems in the hospital. Von tries to help Adam. Terri learns the truth about Mitch's sister's death.
191	23	"Running on Empathy"	Catherine Roden	Denise Morgan	9 July 2002
Mitch's world is rocked to the core when he learns that Rose is alleging that Lucy is not his daughter. Terri nurses a fellow Nun who is admitted to hospital and refuses to listen to Von or Charlotte. Scott and Ben work with a new ambulance officer, Frankie, who is later injured in a workplace accident. Luke and Bron look after a young man with Tourette's who has fallen off a stage during his comedy routine. Terri questions her faith.
192	24	"First Steps"	Scott Hartford Davis	Charlie Strachan	16 July 2002
Von is attacked by Adam after she tries to get Gina back on the right path. Terri is missing Mitch and their relationship, however a visit from Victoria causes her to rethink her position. Mitch decides to take a DNA test to prove that he is Lucy's biological father. Jared, Bron and Nelson have trouble nursing two heroin addicts in the high-dependency room – one of whom punches Bron. Charlotte and Paula tried to figure out what's wrong with the new agency nurse.
193	25	"Judgement Day"	Scott Patterson	Louise Crane	23 July 2002
The Ward is sent into a frenzy when a former agency nurse, Debbie Healy who was negligent in the care of a patient returns to assess the nurses. Bron is shocked to learn the reason behind why a patient requested another nurse. Luke and Nelson work on an asthmatic patient whose asthma attacks are worsened by the presence of a videographer. Von is undermined by Debbie. Mitch is having trouble balancing the books at the clinic.
194	26	"Due Diligence"	Catherine Roden	David Hannam & Peter Neale	6 August 2002
Terri struggles to tell Mitch that she's pregnant after their romantic weekend is ruined when Paul and Hannah are involved in a car crash. Bron tries desperately to repair her relationship with Ben before their impending nuptials, but later announces that her wedding is off. Nelson's crush on Charlotte begins to show, but when he asks her out on a date, she makes a shocking revelation. Mitch is told by a patient that his clinic is gone.
195	27	"In the Family Way"	Peter Fisk	Christina Milligan & Sarah Walker	6 August 2002
Charlotte and Bron nurse a Catholic patient who try to convince her that the termination of her eighth pregnancy get Terri off-side. Paula hopes that Max's father, Michael will finally get involved in his son's life. Terri's pregnancy becomes the talk of the Ward after it is mistakenly revealed. Paul has trouble accepting Hannah's permanent state of catatonia. The Ward 17 rumour mill begins when Bron spots Ben leaving Matt's birthday party with Paula.
196	28	"An Itch to Scratch"	Julian Pringle	Sally Webb	13 August 2002
Von brings Adam into the Ward and is then subjected to patient's worry when it's announced that he has scabies. Paula runs into trouble with Max when he is assessed for Attention Deficit Disorder. Charlotte and Mitch clash when one of the Detox Clinic's patients is admitted to the Ward. Luke and Paula nurse a patient who was lobotomised in the 1960s. Bron divulges her true feelings about her break-up to Charlotte. Ben and Paula grow closer.
197	29	"No Expectations"	Robert Marchand	Chris Corbett	20 August 2002
Kylie nurses a patient who has a psychiatric history and is diagnosed with liver cancer. Ben and Scott are witness to a hit-and-run and then to Charlotte breaking hospital procedures to save his life. Von and Luke work on a difficult patient whose hand was dismembered in a butchery incident. Mitch is livid when he discovers that Jared has been handing out free syringes to addicts. Jared is threatened by a dealer. Kylie is asked out on a date.
198	30	"The Untouchables"	Peter Fisk	John Concannon	27 August 2002
Jared is ambushed and sexually assaulted when he tries to help two young homeless people. Mitch learns that Terri knows the sex of the baby and begins to bribe the staff of Ward 17 to tell him. Bron and Charlotte look after a patient who believes that her leprosy diagnosis is a death sentence. Nelson nurses a transsexual who is accused of having HIV by Warwick Ellis when he sticks himself. Jared and Mitch help a young heroin addict who tries to abort a baby with wire after she is raped by her brother.
199	31	"Where the Heart Is"	Frank Arnold	John Banas	3 September 2002
Paula and Nelson clash over the restraint of a patient when a young ballet dancer becomes violent due to withdrawals from pain-killers. Von struggles to convince Adam to give his mother Gina, a second chance. Scott is torn when his mother is admitted to the Ward and is diagnosed with cervical cancer. Jared is forced to inform Terri of Peter's marijuana use and this causes a rift between Mitch and Terri. Bron becomes suspicious when Luke tells her that Ben and Paula are seeing each other.
200	32	"Secrets"	Di Drew	Louise Crane	10 September 2002
Terri prepares to tell her mother and sister that she's pregnant, but after a fight with Margaret, she begins bleeding and worries she might miscarry. Bron and Paula are forced to co-nurse a disabled patient, but their professional lives are thrown into jeopardy when Bron accuses Paula of dating Ben. Jared's rape slowly begins to unravel when Charlotte discovers that he has rectal gonorrhoea. Mitch is threatened with legal action after he fires Peter. Luke has a problem when his patient, suffers complications during surgery.
201	33	"Bedtime Stories"	Robert Marchand	Philip Dalkin	17 September 2002
Charlotte and Bron work on a young mother who learns she has cancer and asks her doctor to make a life-or-death decision for her. Mitch worries the clinic may soon face closure when one of the patients falls into a coma. Ben begins to wonder after a pregnant woman who conceived a child through artificial insemination and the sperm was from an ambulance officer. Jared continues to be in denial about his feelings. Paula and Ben have sex for the first time. In an attempt to make Ben jealous, Bron kisses Charlotte.
202	34	"When All is Lost"	Peter Fisk	David Hannam	24 September 2002
Matt's reputation as the one-stop gossip shop continues to grow after he informs the Ward of Charlotte and Bron's night together. An explosion at the detox clinic puts Mitch's career in jeopardy. A surprise visit from the health inspector overworks the staff of Ward 17. Paula grows frustrated with Charlotte and finds it increasingly difficult to work with her. Jared comes face-to-face with the man who raped him. Bron is promoted to Acting NUM. After slipping and fracturing her ankle, Terri suffers a miscarriage.
203	35	"Into the Light"	Scott Feeney	Denise Morgan	1 October 2002
Bron is forced to face her personal demons when the man that molested her as a child is admitted to the Ward. Jared agrees to do a shift on Ward 17 and is forced to dodge Cara after a one-night stand. Charlotte and Von fight for the rights of a same-sex couple whose relationship is not recognised by their families. Mitch tries desperately to save his beloved Detox Clinic with no luck. Ben begins to feel trapped by his feelings for Paula. Bron attempts to make peace with her father.
204	36	"Big Kids"	Bill Hughes	Sarah Walker	8 October 2002
Charlotte is forced into a conflict of interest when the husband of her former lover, Liz Thomas is admitted to the Ward. Matt's world comes crashing down when a patient accuses him of exposing himself to their young daughter. Mitch wakes up with a black-eye and no recollection of the previous night's event, but he is later arrested for Peter Buchanan's assault. After clashing with Bron continually, Paula realises she is being childish. Matt resigns from Ward 17. Scott tells Rebecca that he loves her.
205	37	"You Should've Said"	Julian Pringle	Loraine Rogers	15 October 2002
Terri returns from her mother's house after her miscarriage and helps Mitch renovate their new house. Von is horrified to learn that Adam has been admitted to the Ward after a drug overdose. Nelson is appalled when he learns that a terminally ill patient hasn't informed her husband of her condition. Kylie is accepted for a new job in Paris. Charlotte and Jared are amazed when the nausea symptoms of a hypochondriac are settled after he is placed on a drug trial.
206	38	"Hear Me, Touch Me, Heal Me"	Peter Fisk	Sally Webb	22 October 2002
The All Saints Emergency Department goes into overdrive when an ongoing bikie feud results in a street shooting. Mitch learns that his aggravated assault trial has been adjourned. Jared and Charlotte look after an older woman with a long list of unrelated symptoms, who doesn't have the ability to shut up. Von discovers the startling truth behind a patient's self-harming. Mitch's hearing begins to dissipate and wonders if it could be caused by something more sinister.
207	39	"Down to Earth"	Scott Feeney	Chris Corbett	29 October 2002
Ben and Bron are taken hostage by a schizophrenic patient who believes that they are possessed by aliens and performs an exorcism. Luke is forced to hold his personal beliefs out of a medical issue when one of his patients has a stroke, and the other needs an organ donation. Jared grows infatuated with the temporary ward clerk. Ben declares his love for Bron. Mitch learns that Rose is taking him for everything he owns in his divorce settlement.
208	40	"Consuming Passions"	Scott Patterson	John Concannon	5 November 2002
Regina Butcher returns to Ward 17 as the ward clerk after her marriage to Fergus breaks down. Charlotte and Paula work on a post-mastectomy patient who has her infection treated in an interesting way. Jared is trapped by a bloated patient with a brain injury who throws herself at him constantly. Von has a fight on her hands when Adam is involved in a car accident and Gina's mother passes away. Ben is stabbed by the schizophrenic patient that held him hostage.
209	41	"Musical Beds"	Richard Jasek	John Banas	12 November 2002
Ben is admitted to Ward 17 after his stabbing, and he is later rushed to surgery. Kylie's last day at All Saints is tainted when she works with Jared on a patient who is going into renal failure. Scott is having trouble getting along with his new ambulance partner, the arrogant Aaron Collingwood. Nelson and Terri clash when she learns that he is turning away dementia patients to Ward 8. Jared and Kylie have sex one final time. Ben says Bron's name when he wakes up from his coma.
210	42	"Twice the Fun"	Peter Fisk	Philip Dalkin	19 November 2002
Nelson is offered the Nurse Unit Manager position in the Emergency Department and is forced to work with a mysterious blond from his past. Mitch is dumbfounded when firstly, two young patients are admitted to the Ward with brown blood and secondly, he sees Rose. Rebecca and Nelson have a hassle on their hands when a patient's two wives and families show up. Paula continues to clash with Bron when they disagree over the treatment of a patient.
211	43	"Yesterday, Today & Tomorrow"	Peter Fisk	Louise Crane	26 November 2002
Rose returns to Ward 17 as Ben's new physio and conflict ensues between her and Terri. Luke and Jared work on an elderly patient who begins having premonitions that Bron will walk down the aisle, Mitch will hit Terri and a former lover of Charlotte's will return. Scott finds his problem with Aaron worsening and settles it with a punch. Nelson nurses a young alcoholic woman who knows him and reveals that Leanne is his wife. Ben proposes to Bron. Mitch receives word that his divorce came through and proposes to Terri.

== DVD release ==
The Complete Fifth Season
Set Details	Special Features
43 Episodes (1907 Mins.); Episodes 169 - 211; 10-Disc Set; 16:9 Widescreen Aspect Ratio; English (Dolby Digital 2.0 Surround); Distributed by EMI; Rated M; All Region Compatible	Slipcase Packaging
Release Dates	Slipcase Packaging
Australia	Slipcase Packaging
11 July 2007	Slipcase Packaging
