= Chris Kennedy (filmmaker) =

Australian film director, writer and producer

- Born: 1 December 1948; Sydney
- Died: 27 August 2013 (aged 64)
- Awards: Australian Writers Guild Award for Best Original Screenplay (1998), for Doing Time for Patsy Cline

Christopher Kennedy (1 December 1948 – 27 August 2013) was an Australian AFI Award-winning film director, writer, producer, and novelist. He was known for writing the screenplay of Doing Time for Patsy Cline.

== Early life and education ==
Christopher Kennedy was born on 1 December 1948.

He initially trained and qualified as a dentist and later studied at the Swinburne Film and Television School in Melbourne. There, he was dubbed one of a "Gang of Four", along with Paul Goldman, John Hillcoat, and Evan English, owing to their pranks. They once set fire to a lecturer's office, and they were responsible for the "kidnapping a frozen chicken" from lecturer Peter Tammer.

== Career ==
=== Film ===
Kennedy made his first film Glass, a low budget thriller, in 1989 and followed it up with This Won't Hurt a Bit, in 1993.

During the 1990s, he made Doing Time for Patsy Cline and the following decade, A Man's Gotta Do.

He wrote the novel Made in Australia in 2011.

Kennedy owned two companies, Oilrag Productions and Oillamp Books.

== Death ==
Kennedy died from a heart attack on 27 August 2013.

== Awards ==
Kennedy was a three-time Australian Film Institute Awards nominee and an Australian Writer's Guild Award winner.

- 1998: Australian Writers Guild Award for Best Original Screenplay, for Doing Time for Patsy Cline
- 1998: Australian Film Critics Association Award for Best Cinematography, for Doing Time for Patsy Cline
- 1998: San Diego International Film Festival Award for Best Original Script, for Doing Time for Patsy Cline
- 2008: Montreal Film Festival's Golden Zenith for Best Film from Oceania, for A Man's Gotta Do

== Selected filmography ==
- Glass (1989)
- This Won't Hurt a Bit (1993)
- Doing Time for Patsy Cline (1997)
- A Man's Gotta Do (2003)
