= WillFull =

- Directed by: Rebel Penfold-Russell
- Starring: C. Thomas Howell
- Release date: 2002
- Country: Australia
- Language: English
- Box office: A$21,033 (Australia)

WillFull is a 2002 Australian film directed by Rebel Penfold-Russell and starring C. Thomas Howell.

== Cast ==
- C. Thomas Howell as Nat Wolff
- Anna Lise Phillips as Catherine Waterford
- Anne Looby as Katya
- Bud Tingwell as Martin
- John Gaden as Bill
- Felix Williamson as Scott
- Julia Zemiro as Libby
