= Beneath Clouds =

- DVD cover
- Directed by: Ivan Sen
- Written by: Ivan Sen
- Produced by: Teresa-Jayne Hanlon
- Starring: Dannielle Hall; Damian Pitt
- Cinematography: Allan Collins
- Edited by: Karen Johnson
- Music by: Ivan Sen; Alister Spence
- Release date: 23 May 2002
- Running time: 90 minutes
- Country: Australia
- Language: English
- Budget: A$2.5 million
- Box office: A$548,416 (Australia)

Beneath Clouds is a 2002 film by Indigenous Australian director Ivan Sen. It is the feature film debut by the two lead actors. Damian Pitt was approached by Sen on the streets of Moree, New South Wales, and had never acted before. Dannielle Hall was cast through a more traditional method, via an audition tape. Much of the support cast were local residents from Pitt's hometown of Moree.

== Plot synopsis ==
Lena has an absent Irish father she longs to see and an Aboriginal mother she finds disgusting. When she breaks away, she meets up with petty criminal Vaughn who's just escaped from low security prison to reluctantly visit his dying mother. Blonde and light-skinned, Lena remains in denial about her Aboriginal heritage; Vaughn is an angry young man with a grudge against all whites. An uneasy relationship begins to form as they hit the road heading to Sydney, taking them on a journey that's as emotional as it is physical, as revealing as it is desperate.

Initially the two reluctant travelling companions are suspicious and wary of each other, but their journey, mostly by foot and the odd lift, builds an understanding between them. The film follows its creator's (Ivan Sen's) own experiences growing up in Inverell, NSW with an Aboriginal mother and a European father who was not around.

== Production ==
The film was financed by the New South Wales Film Commission and the Australian Film Finance Corporation.

== Reception ==
Only two film critics have posted reviews on the Rotten Tomatoes, both positive. Urban Cinefile Critics commented "Displaying about equal amounts of naiveté, passion and talent, Beneath Clouds establishes Sen as a filmmaker of considerable potential". Andrew Howe of eCritic.com called it "One of the few feature films to canvass the issues facing the Aboriginal community from an adolescent perspective".

Australian critic Margaret Pomeranz wrote six years later "I think this is one of the great Australian films of recent years". In her original TV review on SBS Television co-presented with David Stratton, The Movie Show, she gave it 4.5 stars and he gave it 4.

=== Accolades ===
Award	Category	Subject	Result
AACTA Awards (2003 AFI Awards)	Best Film	Teresa-Jayne Hanlon	Nominated
AACTA Awards (2003 AFI Awards)	Best Direction	Ivan Sen	Won
AACTA Awards (2003 AFI Awards)	Best Original Screenplay	Ivan Sen	Nominated
AACTA Awards (2003 AFI Awards)	Best Actress	Dannielle Hall	Nominated
AACTA Awards (2003 AFI Awards)	Best Cinematography	Allan Collins	Won
AACTA Awards (2003 AFI Awards)	Best Original Music Score	Alister Spence	Nominated
AACTA Awards (2003 AFI Awards)	Best Original Music Score	Ivan Sen	Nominated
Berlin International Film Festival	First Movie Award	Ivan Sen	Won
Berlin International Film Festival	Golden Berlin Bear	Ivan Sen	Nominated
Berlin International Film Festival	New Talent Award	Dannielle Hall	Won
FCCA Awards	Best Female Actor	Dannielle Hall	Nominated
FCCA Awards	Best Director	Ivan Sen	Nominated
FCCA Awards	Best Cinematography	Allan Collins	Nominated
FCCA Awards	Best Music Score	Alister Spence	Nominated
FCCA Awards	Best Music Score	Ivan Sen	Nominated
Inside Film Awards	Best Direction	Ivan Sen	Won
Inside Film Awards	Best Actress	Dannielle Hall	Nominated
Inside Film Awards	Best Cinematography	Allan Collins	Won
Inside Film Awards	Best Editing	Karen Johnson	Nominated

== Box office ==
Beneath Clouds grossed $548,416 at the box office in Australia.

== See also ==
- List of Australian films
- Cinema of Australia
