= Young Lions (TV series) =

Australian television series

- Genre: Drama; Crime
- Created by: Michael Jenkins
- Written by: Michael Jenkins; Shelley Birse
- Directed by: Jessica Hobbs; Ian Barry
- Starring: Alex Dimitriades; Alexandra Davies; Tom Long; Anna Lise Phillips; Katherine Slattery
- Composer: Peter Best
- Country of origin: Australia
- Original language: English
- No. of seasons: 1
- No. of episodes: 22

Production
- Executive producer: Michael Jenkins
- Producer: Peter Schreck
- Production locations: Sydney, New South Wales, Australia
- Editor: Martin Connor
- Production companies: Nine Network; Southern Star Entertainment

Original release
- Network: Nine Network
- Release: 17 July – 18 December 2002

Young Lions is an Australian TV police drama shown on the Nine Network in 2002 and in Ireland on RTÉ Two. The storyline of the series revolved around the professional and private lives of four rookie detectives, the Young Lions, of South West 101, an inner city Sydney police station.

The program rated poorly and was not renewed after its first season. Competition from other new drama series and several timeslot changes also contributed to the show's demise.

== Cast ==
=== Main ===
- Alex Dimitriades as Det Snr Constable Eddie Mercia
- Alexandra Davies as Det Snr Constable Donna Parry
- Tom Long as Det Snr Constable Guy 'Guido' Martin
- Anna Lise Phillips as Det Snr Constable Cameron Smart
- Penny Cook as Chief Inspector Sharon Kostas
- Katherine Slattery as Madeleine Delaney
- Alan Cinis as Phil Emerson

=== Recurring/guests ===
Year	Title	Ep. Count
Socratis Otto	Justin Carmody	15
Anna Torv	Irena Nedov	13
Betty Lucas	Grace Beaumont	1
Brendan Cowell	Jason Doone	2
Caroline Brazier	Gabrielle Hall	1
Chris Lilley	Mick Dwyer	1
Damien Garvey	William Solomons	2
Daniel Frederiksen	Chris Doone	2
Daniel Roberts	Ross Kennedy	1
David Campbell	Grant Fisher	1
Essie Davis	Julie Morgan	2
Genevieve O’Reilly	Kimberly Oswald	1
Hayley McElhinney	Mel Gilham	2
Jack Finsterer	Tony Kennedy	1
Jeremy Sims	Rob Carne	3
John Gregg	George Quinlan QC / Magistrate	4
John Noble	Adam Gallagher	4
John Waters	Snr Det Bill Martin	7
Jonny Pasvolsky	Daniel Crane	2
Josef Ber	Officer Craig Simons	1
Josh Quong Tart	Dr Martin	1
Justin Rosniak	Noel Jarvine	2
Kate Beahan	Emma Greer	2
Kick Gurry	Danny	1
Kieran Darcy-Smith	Marty Charlton	2
Leeanna Walsman	Freda Larsen	2
Leon Ford	Josef Pozinak	1
Loene Carmen	Sarah	1
Marta Dusseldorp	Catherine McGregor	1
Maya Stange	Sophie Rinaldi	6
Michael Denkha	Paco	2
Nadine Garner	Rebecca Ann Sharpe	2
Oliver Ackland	Liam Quinlan	1
Peter Kowitz	Alan Destin	1
Peter O'Brien	Daryll Flynn	1
Rhys Muldoon	Justice Paul Bergan	3
Ryan Johnson	Alex Brooks	1
Simon Burke	Rob Watson	3
Steve Le Marquand	SPG Officer Stevens	1
Steven Vidler	Sgt Brian Graham	1
Susan Prior	Christine Malouf	1
Terry Serio	Det Shane Wesson	3
Victoria Longley	Police Psychiatrist	4
Zac Drayson	Jay Stubbings	1

== Release ==
=== Broadcast ===
The series ran from 17 July through 18 December 2002, and consisted of 23 episodes.

=== Critical reception ===
The Age television critic Ross Warneke criticised the show, writing, "it seems unable—or perhaps unwilling—to break the shackles of copshow cliche. ... It may be flashier, faster and more crowded than the cop shows of yore, but there's not much else." Comparing it to another Michael Jenkins show, Wildside, Amanda Meade of The Australian called Young Lions "another slick urban police drama with flawed cops, dark beautifully filmed cityscapes and, occasionally, characters who repeat their lines". The Courier-Mail's Jackie Sinnerton found the series to be "edgy, sexy and urbane, the 22-part drama has Jenkins written all over it".

== Episode list ==
No.	Episode Title	Synopsis	Premiered
1	Pilot	Donna's first day on the job is challenged when the station is rocked to its core by a convicted cop-killer intent on exacting revenge.	17 July 2002
2	Mardi Gras	Guido is forced to deal with his yearnings: for his job, and the woman he loves.	24 July 2002
3	Lick Me Baby	Cameron's new lover accuses her partner, Guido Martin, of stealing money while he is working undercover.	31 July 2002
4	Boy School Bullies	Donna's positive outlook is challenged as she deals with elitism and prejudice.	7 August 2002
5	Fruit Market Underworld	Guido's undercover past threatens his job at South West police station.	14 August 2002
6	Asylum Seekers	Eddie, Donna and Madeleine investigate a riot at a detention centre and the escape of a teenage refugee.	21 August 2002
7	The City and the Taxi Driver	The detectives spend a night on the streets amid simmering tensions, while Cameron plumbs the depths of her own soul to connect with a killer.	18 September 2002
8	Kickboxer Kills Rapist	Donna defends a woman who is charged with murder after she kills a rapist.	25 September 2002
9	Arson Case	An arson case is reopened, because an alleged police cover-up sent the wrong man to prison. Guido is forced to confront the truth about his detective father and his role in the conviction.	2 October 2002
10	The Priest	Eddie's faith and his friendship with Father Paul Moran are tested when Irena's sister goes missing and foul play is suspected.	9 October 2002
11	China Town	Cameron is torn between Guido and his father, Senior Detective Bill Martin, and she soon finds her integrity and a boy's life are on the line.	16 October 2002
12	Nursing Home	Eddie finds himself in contact with a former neighbour during an investigation into a suspicious death at a nursing home.	23 October 2002
13	Kickboxer on Trial	Cameron is torn between Guido and his father, Senior Detective Bill Martin, and she soon finds her integrity and a boy's life are in the line.	6 November 2002
14	The Navy: Part 1	Guido's Naval Captain brother returns home a hero, and tensions surface as a female naval officer is found murdered. Cameron works with Bill to nab a Chinese gang leader.	13 November 2002
15	The Navy: Part 2	Guido and Cameron each face a personal crisis-and their friendship is tested-as Guido's father and brother come under suspicion.	13 November 2002
16	Lone Star Blues	Eddie's integrity is tested as the father of Irena's son is released from prison. Eddie wants to reunite the boy with his father-but could lose Irena.	20 November 2002
17	Drag Racing	Donna loves the police force and Crime Scene Examiner, Justin Carmody. Her feelings for both are tested as she investigates a fatal car smash involving police.	27 November 2002
18	Grand Prix	Paul Bergin asks Guido's father for help to bring down a Chinese gang boss. Cameron seeks justice for a girl found dead in a hotel because of the indifference shown by the partygoers and investigators.	11 December 2002
19	Bill's Death	Guido's friends rally to his side as his father faces a terminal illness - and a murder charge.	11 December 2002
20	Serial Killer: Part 1	The investigation into the suicide of an Olympic swimming hopeful escalates when those around the investigation begin to be killed off.	18 December 2002
21	Serial Killer: Part 2	The search for the serial killer continues. Donna's life is put on the line when she becomes involved in a hostage situation. Guido has to decide his future with Sophie.	18 December 2002

- List of Australian television series
- List of Nine Network programs
