= Rainbow Bird and Monster Man =

- Directed by: Dennis K. Smith
- Cinematography: Kevin Anderson
- Release date: 2002
- Country: Australia
- Language: English

Rainbow Bird and Monster Man is a 2002 Australian documentary film, directed by Dennis K. Smith, telling the story of Tony Lock's childhood as a victim of sexual abuse and his attempts as an adult to escape his tortured past. The film explores the reluctance of authorities and families to confront sexual abuse as well as the impact it has on victims' lives.

The film was based on the story "Slaying the Monster", in the book Writing on Tombstones.

== Synopsis ==
Tony Lock recalls himself as a child in the 1960s at the age of four, part of an aloof family in Trentham, Victoria. His father was an alcoholic agricultural labourer. Tony developed a warm attachment to his father's workmate and drinking friend Gordon Kerr, but the older man then sexually assaulted both Tony and his younger brother periodically ten years before his parents unexpectedly saw this for themselves and were forced to acknowledge what was happening.

Tony and his brother were then sent away to live with family in Melbourne. Tony seemed to be living a normal, happy life, but as he aged into his twenties he lost his job and drifted in a life of alcoholism and drug abuse. Eventually Tony left for Western Australia to come clean.

After hearing radio reports of sexual abuse in the Catholic Church, Tony returned to his hometown in 1995 to have Gordon charged. Despite having a confession from Gordon himself, the police refused to initiate criminal proceedings. One night soon afterwards Tony became very agitated; he pleaded with the police to detain him so he would not harm himself or anyone else but was ignored. Tony went to Gordon's home and knocked on the door, holding an axe for self defense. Gordon opened the door and pointed a gun at him. During a moment when the gun was pointed away Tony struck Gorden with the axe.

Tony was charged with murder and convicted of manslaughter under a plea bargain in 1996. As he already served his sentence in custody before being convicted, Tony was released immediately afterwards. The film concludes in 2002 with Tony, who, while functioning in a comparatively normal life, still remains frequently traumatised by his experiences.
