= Dannielle Hall =

Australian actress

- Occupation: Actress
- Years active: 2002
- Notable work: Beneath Clouds

Dannielle Hall is an Australian film actress. For her performance in the film Beneath Clouds Hall was nominated for the 2002 AACTA Award for Best Actress in a Leading Role and won the Piper Heidsieck New Talent Award for Best Young Actress at the Berlin Film Festival. Hall is from Wee Waa in New South Wales and has an Aboriginal mother and an Anglo father.
