= Anna Lise Phillips =

Australian actress

- Born: 1975 (49-50); Australia
- Occupation: Actress
- Parent: Maggi Phillips

Anna Lise Phillips (born 1975) is an Australian actress. She is sometimes credited as Anna Lise, Anna Lise Philips, or Anna-Lise Phillips.

== Early life ==
Phillips grew up in Darwin in the Northern Territory of Australia where she was a founding member of the Corrugated Iron Youth Theatre. Her mother was Maggi Phillips, a dancer .

== Career ==
Philips' first major film role was in The Boys (1998) shortly followed by Envy (also known as The New Girlfriend) for which she was nominated for an AACTA Award for Best Supporting Actor in a Feature Film. Other films of note include Sundance award-winning; Animal Kingdom, Walking on Water, BackTrack, The Pack, A Wreck A Tangle, and The Tank.

In 2002 Phillips played Mabel Fine in Icon's telemovie The Three Stooges with Michael Chiklis, Paul Ben Victor, and Evan Handler.

Phillips first acted on television in 2002, starring in Channel 9's Young Lions. In 2009, she appeared as Jeneana Palmer in Channel Seven's TV soap opera Home and Away.

Phillips has appeared in many Australian TV series including McLeod's Daughters, The Secret Life of Us, Farscape, Stingers, Murder Call, Good Guys Bad Guys, Water Rats, Wildside, The Killing Field, Heartbreak High, Terra Nova, Bastard Boys, Crownies, and City Homicide.

In 2012, she was cast in a recurring role in the American television series Revolution. Phillips starred in Foxtel's 2014 miniseries Devil's Playground with Toni Collette. In 2016, she starred in US comedy Sensitivity Training, which was also shown at the LA Film Festival. In 2020, Phillips made a guest appearance in Neighbours as Jenna Donaldson.

== Filmography ==
=== Film ===
Year	Title	Role	Notes
1998	The Boys	Nola	Feature film
1999	Envy (aka The New Girlfriend)	Rachel	Feature film
2000	A Wreck A Tangle	Max	Feature film
2001	WillFull	Catherine Waterford	Feature film
2002	Walking on Water	Kate	Feature film
2003	Clutch	Judy	Short film
2004	Hooked	Rebecca	Short film
2009	Dream What You Want	Dream Girl	Short film
2010	Not Even a Mouse	Jasmine	Short film
2010	Animal Kingdom	Barrister Justine Hopper	Feature film
2010	Complicity	Drowning Woman	Short film
2011	Katieland	Katie Colvin	Short film
2012	Inhuman Resources	Shelly Bloom	
2015	The Pack	Carla Wilson	Feature film
2015	Backtrack	Erica George	Feature film
2016	Sensitivity Training	Serena	

=== Television ===
Year	Title	Role	Notes
1997	Big Sky	Melanie	Episode: "Boxed In"
1998	A Difficult Woman	Cassie	TV miniseries
1998	Wildside	Laurel Williams	Episode: "1.16"
1998	Water Rats	Megan	Episode: "Soft Target"
1998	Good Guys, Bad Guys	Emily Costello	Episode: "A Chip Off the Old Potato"
1998	Murder Call	Eileen Watson	Season 2, Episode 17: "Blowing the Whistle"
1998	Stingers	Clare Challoner	Episode: "Innocents Abroad"
2000	Marriage Acts	Anna McKinnon	TV film
2000	Farscape	Young Nilaam	Episode: "Vitas Mortis"
2000	The Three Stooges	Mabel Fine	TV film
2001	1000 Meilen für die Liebe		TV film
2002	The Secret Life of Us	Julie	Episodes: "A New World Order", "Free Will", "The Grand Delusion"
2002	Young Lions	Det. Snr. Const. Cameron Smart	Main role (22 episodes)
2004	McLeod's Daughters	Bree Plummer	Episode: "Make or Break"
2005	Blue Water High	Loren's Mum	Episode: "3.9"
2007	Bastard Boys	Cherie Snape	TV miniseries
2009	All Saints	Heather	Episode: "Dreams and Nightmares"
2009	Home and Away	Jeneana Palmer	Recurring role (6 episodes)
2011	City Homicide	Kylie Barnett	Episode: "No Greater Honour: Reward Day"
2011	Crownies	Sonya	Recurring role (5 episodes)
2011	Terra Nova	Teresa	Episode: "What Remains"
2012	Tricky Business	Lara Donnelly	Episode: "Mothercraft"
2012	Revolution	Maggie Foster	Episodes: "Pilot", "Chained Heat", "No Quarter", "The Plague Dogs"
2016	Her Dark Past	Alice	TV film
2018	Harrow	Stephanie Tolson	Main role (10 episodes)
2020–21	Neighbours	Jenna Donaldson	Recurring character
2023	The Clearing	Hannah Wilczek	
