= CILECT =

Film and television school association

- Formation: 1955
- Founded at: France
- Type: Association of film schools
- Headquarters: France
- Location: France
- Website: cilect.org

The International Association of Film and Television Schools (French: Centre international de liaison des écoles de cinéma et de télévision, CILECT) is the association of the world's major film and television schools.

== History ==
CILECT was founded in Cannes in 1955 at the proposal of Rémy Tessonneau, general director of the Institut des hautes études cinématographiques (IDHEC), who gathered together for the first time higher education film school representatives from France, Italy, Poland, Spain, UK, USA, and USSR.

== Functions ==
CILECT's goals are to provide a means for the exchange of ideas among member schools, and to help them understand the future of education for creative personnel in film, television, and related media. It is dedicated to the creation, development and maintenance of regional and international co-operation among its member schools, and to the encouragement of film and television training in the developing world.

== Regional organisations ==
- The Groupement Européen des Ecoles de Cinéma et de Télévision / European Grouping of Film and Television Schools (GEECT) is the organisation of CILECT's European members, including schools in Israel, Lebanon, and Georgia.
- CILECT Ibero América (CIBA) is the organisation of Latin American film and Luso-Hispanic CILECT schools.
- CILECT Asia-Pacific Association (CAPA) is the regional organisation of the CILECT member schools in the Asia-Pacific Region.
- CILECT Africa Regional Association (CARA) is the regional organisation of the CILECT member schools in the African Region.
- CILECT's North American Regional Association (CNA) is the regional organisation of the CILECT member schools in Canada and the USA.
- CILECT East Africa Regional Association (CEARA) is the regional organisation of the CILECT member schools in the East African Region.
