= Maria Theodorakis =

Australian actress

Maria Theodorakis is an Australian stage and television actress who has many credits in television, movies and theatre. She is best known for her roles in the television series CrashBurn and Marshall Law. She has also had guest roles in many television series including Blue Heelers, Stingers, Halifax f.p., State Coroner and Rush.

Theodorakis has also appeared in a number of films including The Castle, The Eye of the Storm and Walking on Water, her role in which won her the 2002 Australian Film Institute Award for Best Actress in a Leading Role.

In 2023, Theodorakis appeared in the Malthouse production of This is Living. In 2024 Theodorakis directed the theatre play Eftihia.

In 2025, Theodorakis appeared in ABC series The Newsreader.

== Filmography ==
=== Television appearances ===
Year	Title	Role	Notes
2025	The Newsreader	Leonie Briggs	5 episodes
2019	My Life Is Murder	Rosa Cortez	1 episode
2018	Wentworth	Detective Sutton	1 episode
2017-18	Neighbours	Louise Mcleod	12 episodes
2015-17	The Ex-PM	Denise / Dr Suchier	2 episodes
2017	Seven Types of Ambiguity	Deborah	2 episodes
2017	Newton's Law	Lee Donaldson	3 episodes
2009	Whatever Happened to that Guy?	Lana Fink	5 episodes
2009	Saved	Liz	TV movie
2008-09	Satisfaction	Fiona Crane	4 episodes
2008	Rush	Marilyn	1 episode
2003	Crashburn	Liv	12 episodes
2003	Evil Never Dies	Roberta	TV movie
2002	Marshall Law	Linda Milano	6 episodes
2000	Halifax f.p.	Ruth Fisher	1 episode
1999	Stingers	Nicky Reeves	1 episode
1998	State Coroner	Mandy Blackwood	1 episode
1997	The Adventures of Lano & Woodley	Constable Abernathy	1 episode
1996-97	Blue Heelers	Augusta	4 episodes
1994	FrontLine	Greek Reporter	

=== Film appearances ===
Year	Title	Role	Notes
2015	Holding the Man	Pleurodesis Nurse	
2011	The Eyes of the Storm	Mary DeSantis	
2002	Walking on Water	Anna	
1997	The Castle	Court Stenographer	
1996	'Till Human Voices Wake Us and We Drown	Mecthild	

=== Staff credits ===
Year	Title	Role	Notes	Ref
2024	Fam Time	Additional writer	1 episode	
2016	Little Acorns	Creator / writer	9 episodes	
2015	Jimmy & Douglas	Writer		
2006	Car Lady & Bike Girl	Writer		

== Theatre ==
Year	Title	Role	Notes	Ref
2024	Eftihia	Play director	La Mama	
2023	This is Living	Jo Miller	Malthouse	
2023	Life of Byron	Various	Alex Theatre	
2021	Because the Night	Claudia	Malthouse	
