= All Saints season 8 =

All Saints
- Season 8
- 2005 Season DVD
- No. of episodes: 41

Release
- Original network: Seven Network
- Original release: 8 February – 22 November 2005

Season chronology
- ← Previous; Season 7 Next → Season 9

The eighth season of the long-running Australian medical drama All Saints began airing on 8 February 2005 and concluded on 22 November 2005 with a total of 41 episodes.

== Cast ==
=== Regular ===
- John Howard as Frank Campion
- Alexandra Davies as Cate McMasters
- Christopher Gabardi as Vincent Hughes
- Tammy MacIntosh as Charlotte Beaumont
- Judith McGrath as Von Ryan
- Mark Priestley as Dan Goldman
- Natalie Saleeba as Jessica Singleton
- Paul Tassone as Nelson Curtis
- Wil Traval as Jack Quade
- Georgie Parker as Terri Sullivan (episodes 1–19)
- Chris Vance as Sean Everleigh (episodes 40–41)

=== Recurring ===
- Celia Ireland as Regina Butcher (episodes 1–12)
- Sibylla Budd as Deanna Richardson (episodes 40–41)

=== Guest ===
- Trilby Beresford as Kathleen Campion (6 episodes)
- Susan Prior as Beth Chandler (15 episodes)
- Kate Sheil as Victoria Carlton (3 episodes)
- Jaime Mears as Kerry Lytton (19 episodes)
- Ben Tari as Jared Levine (1 episode)
- Liz Alexander as Dr. Alison Newell (7 episodes)
- Grant Bowler as Nigel 'Mac' Macpherson (6 episodes)
- Anne Tenney as Trish Turner (3 episodes)
- Troy Planet as Denis Pool (1 episode)
- Nicole da Silva as Sasha Fernandez (15 episodes)
- Wendy Strehlow as Lorraine Tanner (8 episodes)
- Douglas Hansell as Aaron Roth (7 episodes)
- Jacob Allan as Colin Fenely (3 episodes)
- Peter Phelps as Doug 'Spence' Spencer (6 episodes)
- Alexandra Fowler as Eve Ballantyne (1 episode)
- Augusto Suarez as Dave Forbes (1 episode)
- Elaine Smith as Joanne Miller (1 episode)
- John Hannan as Robert Aunty Eve Purdy (1 episode)
- Ella Scott Lynch as Shauna Lapin (1 episode)
- Shane Withington as Bobby Smithy Smith (1 episode)
- Tim Elston as Roger (1 episode)
- Matt Holmes as Pete Sinclair (1 episode)
- Lucy Durack as Emma Christian (1 episode)
- Ron Haddrick as Bill Roddick (1 episode)
- Noel Hodda as Rob Kydd (1 episode)
- Josephine Mitchell as Amelia Kydd (1 episode)
- Matt Doran as Toby Sample (1 episode)
- Bob Baines as Bill Pedersen (1 episode)
- Justin Rosniak as Craig Mendelsohn (1 episode)
- Sarah Chadwick as Karen Stoner (1 episode)
- Matthew Newton as Derek Cook (1 episode)

== Episodes ==
Please Note: All episode titles are listed accurately as to how they appeared on the episode.

No. overall	No. in season	Title	Directed by	Written by	Original release date
295	1	"Happy New Year"	Peter Fisk	Sarah Walker	8 February 2005
Life changes forever when the All Saints emergency team is caught up in the unfolding chaos of a balcony collapse at a local nightclub where they are attending a New Year's Eve charity function.
296	2	"Outside Looking In"	Catherine Millar	Toby Wallace	15 February 2005
A tragic accident brings Frank's ex-wife into the ED as his worst nightmare confronts him. As Mac faces the possibility of life in a wheelchair, Gill and Cate try to come to terms with it. Jack comes to an uneasy truce with Charlotte and his impending fatherhood, while Dan helps two young girls at the nightclub before they face the disastrous consequences of their choices.
297	3	"Sins of the Mothers"	Robert Marchand	John Banas	22 February 2005
Cate's early morning visit with Mac sours and sets the tone of her entire day. Back down in the Emergency Department, Cate comes face to face with a past unresolved situation when a prostitute is brought in brutally bashed. When Cate finds out the patient is the mother of the child she saw in a brothel, she rushes in where angels fear to tread.
298	4	"Begging For It"	Shawn Seet	Kevin Roberts	1 March 2005
A patient, wearing pyjamas and covered in blood, collapses in the waiting room of All Saints before being able to give any details. The trouble is he doesn't have any wounds. So whose blood is it?
299	5	"Lost and Found"	Catherine Millar	Elizabeth Coleman	8 March 2005
Nelson faces his inner demons when he discovers a six-year-old girl, near death, locked in a car outside a pub on a blistering summer's day. When the girl's father turns up in the ED, drunkenly belligerent, then full of remorse, Nelson fury forces him to goad the father into violence.
300	6	"Potential"	Jean-Pierre Mignon	Peter Neale	15 March 2005
All Saint celebrates its 300th episode with an emotionally charged hour of drama as Charlotte is sent sprawling by a hit and run driver and fights to save her unborn child.
301	7	"Letting Go"	Robert Marchand	Rick Held & Louise Crane-Bowes	29 March 2005
In the aftermath of Charlotte's miscarriage, Terri returns to All Saints to a cold reception from Jack. In this bitter mood, Jack has little patience for a man brought in with septic shock from self-inflicted wounds following the death of his twin brother.
302	8	"Fractured"	Pino Amenta	Sean Nash	5 April 2005
A head-on accident between a motorcyclist and a semi-trailer, that could be a suicide attempt, creates heartache for both families in this week's All Saints. Focussing on finding a diagnosis for a 16-year-old schoolboy whose limbs keep periodically failing him, Jessica doesn't see the crush he has on her.
303	9	"Funny Games"	Shawn Seet	Andrew Kelly	12 April 2005
Vincent is thrown when Beth shows up at the hospital complaining of severe abdominal pain. Charlotte, unable to find the cause of the pain, refers Beth to Vincent for exploratory surgery but Vincent is convinced that Beth's pain is psychosomatic and refuses to operate.
304	10	"Boys will be Boys"	Jean-Pierre Mignon	Sarah Walker	19 April 2005
When Cate and Sasha respond to an early morning call-out they find themselves circled by a group of young blokes at a buck's night. When the All Saints Radiographers go on strike for a pay rise, the Emergency Department is flung into chaos and deep tensions arise between the men.
305	11	"Time Bomb"	Aarne Neeme	Fiona Kelly	26 April 2005
A car explosion rocks a local supermarket, sending waves of paranoia through the community. When Cate and Sasha arrive on-site, Sasha struggles to deal with the devastation and ends up wondering whether she's cut out to be an Ambo. A writer, Des Callahan, who has just released a controversial book on terrorism, believes this was an attack on his life.
306	12	"While You Were Sleeping"	Pino Amenta	Bridie O'Neill	3 May 2005
It's night shift in the Emergency Department and Dan is hoping for a quiet night - but even the best-laid plans are destined to fail. When a patient collapses in the Waiting Room, no one expects the case will be quite so baffling. Meanwhile, Charlotte and Vincent's big night on the town is unexpectedly cut short due to an incident at a nightclub.
307	13	"Echoes"	Catherine Roden	John Banas	10 May 2005
Terri is stunned when two faces from her past are brought into the hospital. Following a car accident, Lucy Stevens, the young daughter of Terri's late husband Mitch, is rushed into the emergency department, along with Rose's mother, Victoria.
308	14	"Innocent until..."	Jean-Pierre Mignon	Susan Hore	17 May 2005
During a violent siege at a brothel, Sasha and Cate witness Connie, a prostitute, being slashed by a knife-wielding assailant while another victim lies close by. When Patrick, the assailant, lunges at a cop he is shot and apprehended. In the ED Patrick abuses Jessica, forcing Nelson to replace her with Dan, who eventually finds out the source of Patrick's emotional pain.
309	15	"False Convictions"	Bill Hughes	Sarah Walker	24 May 2005
Cate and Sasha find a teenage girl, Erin, seriously injured in a fall from a railway bridge. Cate makes a controversial decision in a last-ditch attempt to save Erin's life. Vincent faces court, charged with assault and accused of stalking. With Charlotte by his side, Vincent listens to Beth's lies on the stand, realising with horror that the truth will not necessarily win the day.
310	16	"Maternal Instinct"	Jessica Hobbs	Toby Wallace	31 May 2005
Inside a middle-class suburban house, Cate and Stuart step into one man's living nightmare when they discover his wife has cut off his penis with a kitchen knife. Worse, she has hidden the severed member and refuses to disclose its whereabouts. Von finds herself in an awkward territory when she is forced into the unfamiliar role of surrogate mother to her niece Kerry.
311	17	"Double Lives"	Cameron Welsh	Peter Neale	7 June 2005
Tensions are high between Cate and Stuart when they deal with Nathan, a young father who is trapped in workplace machinery. For Cate, the situation brings back memories of losing her father. As far as Stuart is concerned her hand-holding exercise is way beyond their call of duty and, by the end of the day, both Ambos have gone through significant personal and professional changes.
312	18	"New Beginnings"	Jean-Pierre Mignon	Sean Nash	14 June 2005
Terri finds herself nursing a girl suffering from stress-related migraine headaches - and she's only 14. Cate's first day as a full-time Emergency Department nurse convinces her she's made the right move from the Ambulance Service. Nelson, after a successful first day back as Nursing Unit Manager, is more than happy to take the next step in his personal life.
313	19	"Satisfaction"	Peter Fisk	Andrew Kelly	21 June 2005
A horrific accident brings a family into the Emergency Department, and Terri finds herself spending her last day at All Saints on a crusade to alleviate a young girl's guilt. Her last day is fraught with complications as a family's celebration goes horribly wrong and their hot-air balloon crashes in dense bushland.
314	20	"In the Name of Love"	Shawn Seet	Sarah Walker	28 June 2005
Jessica is finally honest with Stuart as to why they broke up and admits she is still a virgin. Full of guilt and confusion over Beth targeting Jessica with a car bomb, Vincent is unable to shake the feeling Beth is watching him and his friends' every move.
315	21	"Poison"	Cameron Welsh	Fiona Kelly	5 July 2005
What starts as a normal day in the Emergency Department is quickly thrown into chaos when Frank receives an urgent call informing him his house is on fire. The torment of previous weeks is taking its toll on Vincent. He can't sleep, can't concentrate and is only just staying on top of things. On a trauma callout, Vincent and Stuart have a heated exchange over the treatment of a patient.
316	22	"Right to Life"	Catherine Roden	Sam Meikle	12 July 2005
When young couple Craig Mendolsohn and Megan Harris are brought in after an MVA, Charlotte and Jack take a special interest in their treatment after it's discovered that Megan is five months pregnant. After recent events, the rest of the staff are beginning to resent being targeted by Beth, Vincent is close to the breaking point and it's Cate who gives him an ultimatum.
317	23	"Divide and Conquer"	Pino Amenta	John Banas	19 July 2005
When Vincent takes a call from Beth claiming that she's planted a bomb in the Emergency Department, a major evacuation of the hospital is triggered. However, the morning has also seen the admission of a Spanish diplomat potentially suffering from SARS. The patient is in isolation and unable to be transferred.
318	24	"Love Me, Love Me Not"	Peter Fisk	Louise Crane-Bowes	2 August 2005
The after-effects of the bomb scare are still being felt by all. As Frank and Nelson deal with the administrative aftermath, Vincent deals with the police investigation surrounding the disappearance of Cate that afternoon.
319	25	"Immortal"	Robert Marchand	Faith McKinnon	9 August 2005
It's been a few days since Beth unleashed her final campaign of terror upon Vincent and Cate. The fallout of that sees Vincent a broken man, holed up in a seedy hotel with many bottles of scotch for company. Charlotte is frustrated by Vincent's refusal to contact her, assuming he's chosen Cate as his support.
320	26	"Moving On"	Mark Piper	Sarah Walker	9 August 2005
Stuart is in no mood to pick up Bradley, a middle-aged man who is behaving strangely in a park. Later when Stuart allows himself to be drawn into a sparring match with a badly injured brawler, who then collapses, he knows he has gone too far... that afternoon, Dan finds Stuart packing his bags.
321	27	"Frozen Moments"	Pino Amenta	Louise Crane-Bowes	16 August 2005
Jessica is still stinging from the mysterious disappearance of Stuart and Dan is keeping close tabs on her. An early morning trip to a supermarket sees them seek refuge in the walk-in freezer with a dying security guard when a gunman runs rampage through the complex. Fearing for their lives, they are forced into extraordinary actions to keep their patients and themselves alive.
322	28	"Room for Improvement"	Peter Fisk	Margaret Wilson	23 August 2005
Nelson receives a surprise visit from Trish Turner, a social worker who lives and works in the same Aboriginal community in the Northern Territory where Nelson previously lived with his first wife, Diane. Nelson has decided he needs to see his daughter Kahlia, the child he left behind when he couldn't cope after Dianne's death.
323	29	"Requiem"	Robert Marchand	Peter Gawler	30 August 2005
A light plane carrying a group of kids from the far west of the state to Sydney for the upcoming state Eisteddfod crashes at the city outskirts. The pilot is dead and many of the kids seriously injured. Frank, Vincent, Jack, Charlotte and the nursing staff move swiftly to save lives and limbs.
324	30	"Spinning Out"	Mark Piper	Sean Nash	6 September 2005
An illegal drag racing meet leaves a young man pinned to a concrete column. Frank sends Vincent and Cate out to deal with the situation. Cate, acutely aware of Vincent's recent emotional challenges, is concerned he won't be up to the task. But, as the day progresses Vincent performs under enormous pressure changing Cate's professional and personal opinion of him.
325	31	"Honourable Things"	Tony Tilse	Chris Roache	13 September 2005
Nelson, yearning to make contact with the daughter he hasn't seen for years, is uncertain it's the right thing to do. Charlotte feels that Vincent is hiding developments in his personal life from her. Her suspicions are confirmed when she witnesses him being overprotective of Cate. Two bikies from rival gangs, the Hangmen and the Vipers, are brought into the Emergency Department after a brawl.
326	32	"A Lonely Road"	Aarne Neeme	Kevin Roberts	20 September 2005
Any thoughts of a quiet day are quashed as the Ambulance Bay doors crash open delivering Jamie and his mum Karen from a motor vehicle accident, closely followed by Kent, a cyclist who's gone under a bus. Moving from one medical crisis to another, the staff marvel at the fact Kent made it through the doors at all.
327	33	"Time and Tide"	Lynn Hegarty	John Banas	27 September 2005
Jack has a crisis on his hands. A strangely evasive patient has been triaged by Von and asks for Jack specifically to treat her. When she starts asking everyone personal questions about him, Jack begins to feel very uneasy. His concerns are exacerbated when the woman turns out to have what could be terminal cancer.
328	34	"One of Those Days"	Bill Hughes	Tim Gooding	4 October 2005
The Department's on Code Red and understaffed, it's chaotic in the ED. Nelson finds himself delivering a baby with a reluctant Jessica as his only aid.
329	35	"Life's Lottery"	Jeffrey Walker	Sally Webb	11 October 2005
Charlotte is attending a medical conference at a plush resort, something of a brief, Clayton's holiday, which she was not expecting to impact her in any significant way. A 37-year-old woman presents Jack and Dan with a medical mystery when she's admitted with a first-ever, and very severe, asthma attack.
330	36	"Out of Darkness"	Aarne Neeme	Katherine Thomson	18 October 2005
Charlotte discovers that what happens at the conference doesn't always stay at the conference. A blackout throws everything on its head at the ED, with both Nelson and Charlotte surprising themselves with the decisions they make.
331	37	"Taking the Plunge"	Jean-Pierre Mignon	Charlie Ctrachan	25 October 2005
Vincent's mate is sleeping with his ex and he doesn't like it! Cate grows even more concerned about how much attention Vincent seems to be giving Charlotte recently. Nelson faces his Nurse Practitioner's Paediatric assessments with Spence. Spence throws him a challenge, in the form of Joey Egan, a street smart 10-year-old primed to be as unhelpful as possible.
332	38	"Thicker than Water"	Bill Hughes	Margaret Wilson	1 November 2005
Are all her dreams coming true? Charlotte receives a spontaneous offer from Spence, who asks her to come overseas with him, to work for Doctors Without Borders. Meanwhile, the new Medical Response Unit gets their first call-out following the collapse of a disused tunnel.
333	39	"Reckless"	Shawn Seet	Peter Gawler	8 November 2005
Ambulance officers are called to a vast auto wrecker's yard where a young man appears to have been attacked and left for dead by a pair of rampaging guard dogs. The dilemma for the ambos is how to rescue the poor guy, who appears to be bleeding out, without risking their own lives.
334	40	"Season of Change"	Cameron Welsh	Fiona Kelly	15 November 2005
Nelson's about to go on leave for his wedding and honeymoon and his replacement arrives in the shape of a sexy, ambitious young woman called Deanna. Dan's immediately won over but Jessica is not happy, believing she should have been given the job. Charlotte is finding it particularly hard now that Spence has left. Her emotional pain is echoed in Oscar Wu who arrives on the ward in agony.
335	41	"In Sickness And in Health"	Jean-Pierre Mignon	Louise Crane-Bowes	22 November 2005
The day of Nelson and Kerry's wedding sees the ED filling up with victims of a chemical explosion in a paint factory. As multiple casualties arrive, the team is forced to put aside well wishes for the happy couple as they deal with the traumas the explosion has given rise to. And the entire team is given a lesson they won't forget in a hurry, life really is too short.
