= All Saints season 9 =

All Saints
- Season 9
- 2006 Season DVD
- No. of episodes: 40

Release
- Original network: Seven Network
- Original release: 28 February – 21 November 2006

Season chronology
- ← Previous; Season 8 Next → Season 10

The ninth season of the long-running Australian medical drama All Saints began airing on 28 February 2006 and concluded on 21 November 2006 with a total of 40 episodes.

== Cast and characters ==
=== Main cast ===
Character	Actor(s)	Profession	Duration
Von Ryan	Judith McGrath	Nurse	336–375 (Full season)
Charlotte Beaumont	Tammy Macintosh	Doctor	336–375 (Full season)
Nelson Curtis	Paul Tassone	Nursing Unit Manager	336–349 (until episode 14)
Vincent Hughes	Christopher Gabardi	Doctor; Surgical Registrar	336–347, 367 – 375 (until episode 12, from episode 32)
Frank Campion	John Howard	Director of Emergency Medicine	336–375 (Full season)
Jack Quade	Wil Traval	Doctor	336–375 (Full season)
Jessica Singleton	Natalie Saleeba	Nurse	336–344 (until episode 9)
Cate McMasters	Alexandra Davies	Ambulance Officer; Nurse	336–375 (Full season)
Dan Goldman	Mark Priestley	Nurse; Nursing Unit Manager	336–375 (Full season)
Sean Everleigh	Chris Vance	Doctor	336, 342 – 375 (episode 1, from episode 7)
Bartholomew West	Andrew Supanz	Doctor	349–375 (from episode 14)

=== Recurring cast ===
Character	Actor(s)	Profession	Duration
Erica Templeton	Jolene Anderson	Nurse	345–375 (31 episodes)
Miklos Vlasek	John Waters	Director of Surgery	350–361 (12 episodes)
Gabrielle Jaegar	Virginia Gay	Nursing Unit Manager	353–375 (20 episodes)
Zoe Gallagher	Allison Cratchley	Doctor	359–375 (15 episodes)

=== Guest cast ===
Wendy Strehlow, Ally Fowler, Elizabeth Alexander, Naomi Wallace, Trilby Beresford, Mark Owen-Taylor, Murray Bartlett, Zoe Carides, Barry Otto, Alex Cook, Peter Phelps, Lucy Bell, George Spartels, Geoff Morrell, Tony Llewellyn-Jones, Gosia Dobrowolska, Chris Truswell, Zac Drayson, Lynette Curran, Anna Anderson, and Jacinta Stapleton.

== Episodes ==
Please Note: All episode titles are listed accurately as to how they appeared on the episode.

No. overall	No. in season	Title	Directed by	Written by	Original release date
336	1	"Til Death Do Us Part"	Cameron Welsh	Louise Crane-Bowes	28 February 2006
Rocked by the death of Nelson's fiance, emotions boil over and conflict brews between Cate and Charlotte.
337	2	"The Real Thing"	Bill Hughes	John Banas	7 March 2006
As the team uncovers the horrible truth behind a young boy's alien fixation, Dan is glued to the phone desperately trying to help a man who has shot his wife.
338	3	"Moment of Truth"	Cameron Welsh	Sean Nash	14 March 2006
An aggressive martial arts expert terrorises the ED, and a shocking revelation leaves Nelson's future at All Saints in doubt.
339	4	"No Way Out"	Robert Marchand	Faith McKinnon	21 March 2006
Tempers fray as Vincent is frustrated by Jack's negligence and Nelson cracks under Franks watchful eye.
340	5	"The Things We Do"	Lynn Hegarty	Kevin Roberts	28 March 2006
A patient's unusual condition causes the ED to fall apart as Deanna lures Jack even further into her web.
341	6	"Facing the Music"	Jean-Pierre Mignon	Charlie Strachan	4 April 2006
Tensions skyrocket in Resus when Dan walks out on a confronting resuscitation.
342	7	"Behind Closed Doors"	Cameron Welsh	Chris Roache	11 April 2006
Deanna makes an accusation that is set to rock the ED to its core. The ED's new doctor comes to blows with Dan.
343	8	"The Mercy Seat"	Peter Fisk	Peter Gawler	18 April 2006
Deanna makes an accusation that is set to rock the ED to its core. The ED's new doctor comes to blows with Dan.
344	9	"Shadows of the Heart"	Shawn Seet	Sam Meikle	25 April 2006
The team goes into crisis mode when one of their own is found at death's door.
345	10	"Just Desserts"	Jean-Pierre Mignon	Tim Gooding	2 May 2006
A plan is hatched to oust Deanna from the Emergency Department. Frank proves to be anything but a model patient.
346	11	"Brothers in Arms"	Nicholas Bufalo	Fiona Kelly	9 May 2006
Vincent puts Jack to the test during an MRU callout where a man's hand is caught in a commercial mincer.
347	12	"Wait and See"	Lynn Hegarty	John Banas	16 May 2006
A case of apparent rage and domestic violence leads to a fascinating neurological mystery.
348	13	"Getting to Know You"	Peter Fisk	Sean Nash	23 May 2006
A fire ravages Jack's home. Sean and Cate sneak off to a dying patient's house where they discover his horrific past.
349	14	"Sink or Swim"	Jean-Pierre Mignon	Suzanne Hawley	30 May 2006
The new intern has a nightmare first shift in the ED. Nelson hits rock bottom, forcing Frank into a heartbreaking decision.
350	15	"An Apple a Day"	Catherien Millar	Sally Webb	6 June 2006
All Saints new Head of Surgery, Mike Vlasek, has Jack Quade in his sights. Sean and Cate find there's something fishy about a little girl's illness. Bart bumbles his way to a brilliant solution although not without consequences, and he finally makes a breakthru with Frank who agrees to be his mentor.
351	16	"The Way of It"	Bill Hughes	Charlie Strachan	6 June 2006
Sean and Cate go out with the Medical Response Unit to save a young man whose head has been skewered by a metal spike in an accident at a medieval festival. Dan's first shift as Acting NUM is anything but smooth sailing as he deals with Frank's bad mood over the new Surgical Consultant.
352	17	"A Rock and a Hard Place"	Cameron Welsh	Kevin Roberts	13 June 2006
A couple on their way to the airport to begin an overseas holiday end up in the ED after an MVA. Ignoring medical advise, they are desperate to get on their way as soon as possible, but when x-rays reveal the truth about their situation, an armed stand-off ensues in the ED with Von caught in the middle.
353	18	"One for the Road"	Lynn Hegarty	Peter Gawler	20 June 2006
A poker night which gets out of hand with alcohol could spell disaster for Jack when Mike insists that he be the lead surgeon on an operation. A young DJ meanwhile causes a headache for Sean and Dan as he continuously argues with them. Meanwhile, the emergency department's new Nursing Unit Manager arrives for her first shift.
354	19	"By Choice Or By Chance"	Catherine Millar	Margaret Wilson	27 June 2006
When the life of a young boy is put in danger, Frank and Mike struggle to talk sense into the boy's father who is willing to do anything. Sean has to face his demons when assisting in a confronting operation.
355	20	"Tough Love"	Bill Hughes	Sam Meikle	4 July 2006
Sean and Erica are put under enormous emotional strain as they try to help a twenty-two year-old patient cope with the fact that she may never walk again and that her boyfriend may not be there to help her.
356	21	"When Duty Calls"	Cameron Welsh	Chris Roache	11 July 2006
Mike attends his first MVA as part of the MRU and impresses all by trying everything to sustain the life of a young driver. Charlotte and Erica clash over how to best handle a seventeen-year-old sexual assault victim. Gabrielle continues to look out for new ways to maximise the potential of her staff.
357	22	"Two By Two"	Peter Fisk	John Banas	18 July 2006
Three patients present in the ED with similar symptoms within a few hours of each other. One dies. Is this the beginning of a fatal epidemic or just a coincidence? An old university mate of Frank's turns up in the Emergency Department in a bad way. Mike and Frank clash over how best to treat him, medically or surgically.
358	23	"Drawing The Line"	Pino Amenta	Sean Nash	25 July 2006
Mike, Cate and, later Jack, find their 15 minutes of fame – much to Frank's fury and disgust – when they battle to save the life of a badly injured reality show contestant live on air. Dan learns not to judge his patients by their looks, no matter how intimidating or extreme, treat a young man with a jaw dropping facial piercing.
359	24	"Truth Hurts"	Bill Hughes	Louise Crane-Bowes	1 August 2006
After a man who has been shot is dumped in the hospital grounds, he needs surgery to save his life and Mike Vlasek is called in. However, Jack is furious when Mike leaves him to fend for himself in the middle of the difficult operation.
360	25	"Extreme Measures"	Lynn Hegarty	Fiona Kelly	8 August 2006
When attempts to resuscitate a car accident victim fail, the team begin to suspect that all is not what it seems. Cate reveals Mike's terrible secret to Frank. Frank confronts Mike who denies everything.
361	26	"Mind Games"	Cameron Welsh	Charlie Strachan	15 August 2006
The team are baffled by a woman with many faces who confounds the staff with her varied behaviour. Spence returns but not everyone is pleased to see him. Sean and Von track down the cause of an elderly couple's illness. In light of his sudden resignation, Frank challenges Mike to stay and face his demons.
362	27	"One Wrong Step"	Pino Amenta	Sally Webb	22 August 2006
Dan and Zoe get heated over a patient's diagnosis. Charlotte struggles with juggling work, her studies and her pregnancy while Spence commences work on the Paediatric team.
363	28	"Private Lives"	Rob Marchand	Peter Gawler	29 August 2006
Jack finds himself at odds with the new trauma surgeon at the site of a gruesome motor vehicle accident. A man presents with a voracious rash and the team are horrified when they discover its cause. Von finds a teenager's emotional pain far worse than her physical injuries.
364	29	"The Other Man's Shoes"	Peter Fisk	Margaret Wilson	5 September 2006
Spence's thoughts are with Charlotte as he treats a woman who looks to be miscarrying. Jack is rocked by a scandalous revelation about Bianca, while a former nurse creates bedlam in the emergency department.
365	30	"To The Ends of The Earth"	Martin Sacks	Sam Meikle	12 September 2006
A young boy with severe muscular dystrophy arrives at the hospital following a drug overdose. When he wakes and screeches that he would have preferred to die, the hospital staff must decide where they stand
366	31	"Ain't Love Grand"	Daina Reid	Kevin Roberts	19 September 2006
Spence presents Sean and his sister, Jenna, with some unsavoury treatment options for Sean's young niece, putting Spence and Sean at odds with each other. Deciding what to do would be challenging under any circumstances but the family harbours a secret that weighs even more heavily on their choice.
367	32	"Happy Returns"	Nicholas Bufalo	John Banas	26 September 2006
A plane crash sees the arrival of several critically injured victims to All Saints. Vincent, just back from Canada, arrives with two of the incoming – Amy & Mark Miller, newlyweds, who have been fused together in the fire after the crash.
368	33	"Dead Girl Walking"	Jeffrey Walker	Sean Nash	3 October 2006
When a young woman, Paulie, is brought into the ED, Von, Frank and Cate are astounded to be told by the Ambos she believes herself already dead. Spence and Sean's relationship reaches boiling point when it looks as though Molly may be permanently paralysed.
369	34	"Contact"	Cameron Welsh	Andrew Kelly	10 October 2006
Dan joins the Medical Response Unit at the crash site of a bus carrying a junior rugby league team but his decision to ignore protocol lands him in hot water. Everyone is surprised when there is a teenage girl among the survivors
370	35	"Where the Truth Lies"	Kevin Carlin	Fiona Kelly	17 October 2006
Erica's brother AJ arrives in hospital following a prison fight in which a guard is murdered, creating havoc in the ED. Erica is left questioning his involvement in the murder and the person he has turned into; but Dan discovers there's more going on than Erica's brother is prepared to tell her.
371	36	"Jaws of Death"	Bill Hughes	Jeff Truman	24 October 2006
When a plumbing problem shuts down the operating theatres, Vincent and his team must attempt to save a young man's life in the Resus Bay, drawing the attention of the Infection Control Officer. Ben Macedo is haunted by the memory of his mate being taken by a shark and feels guilty he didn't do more to help.
372	37	"Love, Pain & the Whole Damn Thing"	Peter Fisk	Blake Ayshford	31 October 2006
It's the busiest night of the year in the ED. The stress this causes has differing effects on all the staff. A sleep deprived Cate accidentally administers an overdose of a medication to a patient. Bart takes the blame and is given a dressing down by Frank.
373	38	"Breaking Point"	Cameron Welsh	Peter Gawler	7 November 2006
Sean's disapproval of Cate's behaviour and her friendship with Jo, leads her to revisit bad habits resulting in an embarrassing situation with Vincent. A man suffers horrendous injuries in a fall from a great height on a building site
374	39	"Love and Hate"	Tony Krawitz	Sally Webb	14 November 2006
Casey Taylor, dying of Muscular Dystrophy, returns to the ED, his condition having deteriorated badly since he last visited All Saints. His father, Paul, is still refusing to accept that the end is near for his son.
375	40	"Judgement Day"	Bill Hughes	John Banas	21 November 2006
In the ninth-season finale, Cate is admitted to All Saints following a drug overdose; Erica's brother makes a daring escape; and a man with a grudge and a gun creates havoc in the emergency department.
