= AACTA Award for Best Guest or Supporting Actor in a Television Drama =

Australian television award

- Country: Australia
- Presented by: Australian Academy of Cinema and Television Arts (AACTA)
- First award: 2000
- Currently held by: Thomas Weatherall, Heartbreak High (2022)
- Website: http://www.aacta.org

The AACTA Award for Best Guest or Supporting Actor in a Television Drama is an accolade given by the Australian Academy of Cinema and Television Arts (AACTA), a non-profit organisation whose aim is to "identify, award, promote and celebrate Australia's greatest achievements in film and television." The award is handed out at the annual AACTA Awards, which rewards achievements in feature film, television, documentaries and short films. From 2000 to 2010, the category was presented by the Australian Film Institute (AFI), the Academy's parent organisation, at the annual Australian Film Institute Awards (known as the AFI Awards). When the AFI launched the Academy in 2011, it changed the annual ceremony to the AACTA Awards, with the current prize being a continuum of the AFI Award for Best Guest or Supporting Actor in a Television Drama.

The award was first presented in 2000 as Best Performance by an Actor in a Guest Role in a Television Drama Series until 2002, when the title was changed to Best Guest or Supporting Actor in a Television Drama. In the following year, the title was changed to Best Actor in a Supporting or Guest Role in a Television Drama or Comedy. By 2006, a separate comedy accolade was established, and the name changed to the current one.

The AACTA Award for Best Guest or Supporting Actor in a Television Drama is given for performances in television drama series, miniseries, telefeature, children's animation or children's drama series. Candidates for this award must be human and male, and cannot be nominated for best lead actor in a television drama in the same year, for the same production. Damon Herriman has received four nominations, more than any other actor, winning one in 2016.

== Winners and nominees ==
In the following table, the years listed correspond to the year that the television programme aired on Australian television; the ceremonies are usually held the following year. The actor whose name is emphasised in boldface and highlighted in yellow have won the award. Those that are neither highlighted nor in bold are the nominees. When sorted chronologically, the table always lists the winning actor first and then the other nominees.

=== Best Performance by an Actor in a Guest Role in a Television Drama Series ===
Year	Actor	Program	Character(s)	Episode/Series	Network
**2000** (42nd)
**2000** (42nd)	**Chris Haywood**	**Stingers**	**A.J. Blackburn**	**Series 2, Episode 18: "Men in the Dark"**	**Nine Network**
**2000** (42nd)	Aaron Blabey	Stingers	Michael Callum	Series 3, Episode 17: "Second Chance"	Nine Network
**2000** (42nd)	Daniel Daperis	Stingers	Adam Hauser	Series 3, Episode 2: "Forced Perspective"	Nine Network
**2000** (42nd)	David Field	Grass Roots	Daryl Kennedy	Series 1, Episode 2: "Late September"	ABC
**2001** (43rd)
**2001** (43rd)	**Gary Day**	**Blue Heelers**	**Commander Reginald Jones**	**Series 8, Episode 29: "The Poisoned Fruit Part 2"**	**Seven Network**
**2001** (43rd)	Steve Adams	Something in the Air	Father Brian	Series 2, Episode 24: "That One Defining Moment"	ABC
**2001** (43rd)	Travis McMahon	Stingers	Jonah Day	Series 4, Episode 2: "Rich Man's World"	Nine Network
**2001** (43rd)	Damian Walshe-Howling	The Secret Life of Us	Mac	Series 1, Episode 10: "State Of Limbo"	Network Ten

=== Best Actor in a Supporting or Guest Role in a Television Drama ===
Year	Actor	Program	Character(s)	Episode/Series	Network
**2002** (44th)
**2002** (44th)	**Clayton Watson**	**Always Greener**	**Mickey Steele**	**Series 1**	**Seven Network**
**2002** (44th)	Gary Waddell	Bad Cop, Bad Cop	Steve McClure	Episode 8: "Yesterday's Zero"	ABC
**2002** (44th)	Tom Long	Heroes' Mountain: The Thredbo Story	Paul Featherstone		Network Ten
**2002** (44th)	Angus Grant	MDA	Dr. Jamie Lawless	Series 1, Episode 7: "When it Rains, it Pours"	ABC

=== Best Actor in a Supporting or Guest Role in a Television Drama or Comedy ===
Year	Actor	Program	Character(s)	Episode/Series	Network
**2003** (45th)
**2003** (45th)	**John Clayton**	**Grass Roots**	**Harry Bond**	**Series 2, Episode 10: "By-Election"**	**ABC**
**2003** (45th)	Francis Greenslade	Welcher & Welcher	Peter-Paul Cohen and Claude Buzzo		ABC
**2003** (45th)	Samuel Johnson	After the Deluge	Toby Kirby		Network Ten
**2003** (45th)	Damien Richardson	The Secret Life of Us	Ken	Series 3, Episode 11: "The Day No Trumpets Sounded"	Network Ten
**2004** (46th)
**2004** (46th)	**Matthew Le Nevez**	**Marking Time**	**Bullet Sheather**		**ABC**
**2004** (46th)	Ray Barrett	All Saints	Doc Connelly	Series 7, Episode 26: "Falling from Grace"	Seven Network
**2004** (46th)	Lech Mackiewicz	Marking Time	Hassan		ABC
**2004** (46th)	Glenn Robbins	Kath & Kim	Kel Knight	Series 3	ABC

=== Best Guest or Supporting Actor in Television Drama ===
Year	Actor	Program	Character(s)	Episode/Series	Network
**2005** (47th)
**2005** (47th)	**Max Cullen**	**Love My Way**	**Gerry Jackson**	**Series 1, Episode 8: "A Different Planet"**	**Fox8**
**2005** (47th)	Tony Barry	Hell Has Harbour Views	Frank Flannery		ABC
**2005** (47th)	Steve Bisley	Hell Has Harbour Views	Bruce Kent		ABC
**2005** (47th)	Frank Gallacher	MDA	Rupert Carr	Series 3, Episode 12: "A Human Cost (Part 4)"	ABC
**2006** (48th)
**2006** (48th)	**Marcus Graham**	**Blue Heelers**	**Pilgrim Bond**	**Series 13, Episode 8: "Moonlighting"**	**Seven Network**
**2006** (48th)	Luke Carroll	RAN: Remote Area Nurse	Paul Gaibui		SBS
**2006** (48th)	Aaron Fa'aoso	RAN: Remote Area Nurse	Eddie Gaibui		SBS
**2006** (48th)	John Waters	All Saints	Dr. Miklos 'Mike' Vlasek	Series 9	Seven Network
**2007** (49th)
**2007** (49th)	**David Ngoombujarra**	**The Circuit**	**Harry Pope**	**Series 1**	**SBS**
**2007** (49th)	Mark Priestley	All Saints	Nurse Dan Goldman	Series 10	Seven Network
**2007** (49th)	Justin Smith	Bastard Boys	Josh Bornstein		ABC
**2007** (49th)	Jack Thompson	Bastard Boys	Tony Tully		ABC
**2008** (50th)
**2008** (50th)	**Damian Walshe-Howling**	**Underbelly**	**Andrew "Benji" Veniamin**	**Episode 7: "Wise Monkeys"**	**Nine Network**
**2008** (50th)	Vince Colosimo	Underbelly	Alphonse Gangitano	Episode 2: "The Sorcerer's Apprentice"	Nine Network
**2008** (50th)	Gary Files	Dogstar	Ramon Ridley	Episode 26: "Tail's End"	Nine Network
**2008** (50th)	Taffy Hany	East West 101	Rahman Malik	Series 1, Episode 1: "The Enemy Within"	SBS One
**2009** (51st)
**2009** (51st)	**Damian De Montemas**	**Underbelly: A Tale of Two Cities**	**Brian Alexander**	**Episode 11: "The Brotherhood"**	**Nine Network**
**2009** (51st)	Bille Brown	3 Acts of Murder	George Ritchie		ABC1
**2009** (51st)	Richard Roxburgh	False Witness	Charles Van Koors	"Episode 2"	UKTV
**2009** (51st)	Jeremy Lindsay Taylor	False Witness	Mark Wilson	"Episode 2"	UKTV
**2010** (52nd)
**2010** (52nd)	**Damien Garvey**	**Underbelly: The Golden Mile**	**Graham "Chook" Fowler**	**Episode 2: "Hurt on Duty"**	**Nine Network**
**2010** (52nd)	Rhys Muldoon	Lockie Leonard	Sarge Leonard	Season 2, Episode 11: "Snake Hide Oil"	Nine Network
**2010** (52nd)	John Waters	Offspring	Darcy Proudman	Series 1	Network Ten
**2010** (52nd)	Ben Winspear	My Place	Michaelis	Series 1, Episode 5: "1968 Sofia"	ABC3
**AACTA Awards**
**2011** (1st)
**2011** (1st)	**Richard Cawthorne**	**Killing Time**	**Dennis Allen**	**"Episode 2"**	**TV1**
**2011** (1st)	Aaron Fa'aoso	East West 101	Detective Sonny Koa	Season 3, Episode 8: "The Price of Salvation"	SBS One
**2011** (1st)	Jacek Koman	Spirited	Potter The Man	Series 2, Episode 2: "Time After Time"	W
**2011** (1st)	Todd Lasance	Cloudstreet	Quick Lamb	"Part 3"	Showcase
**2012** (2nd)
**2012** (2nd)	**Aaron Jeffery**	**Underbelly: Badness**	**Frank O'Rourke**	**Episode 3: "The Loaded Dog"**	**Nine Network**
**2012** (2nd)	Luke Carroll	Redfern Now	Lenny	Season 1, Episode 6: "Pretty Boy Blue"	ABC1
**2012** (2nd)	Abe Forsythe	Howzat! Kerry Packer's War	John Cornell	"Part 1"	Nine Network
**2012** (2nd)	Dan Wyllie	Puberty Blues	Roger Knight	Season 1, "Episode 4"	Network Ten
**2013** (3rd)
**2013** (3rd)	**Luke Ford**	**Power Games: The Packer-Murdoch War**	**Kerry Packer**	**"Part 2"**	**Nine Network**
**2013** (3rd)	Alexander England	Power Games: The Packer-Murdoch War	Clyde Packer	"Part 1"	Nine Network
**2013** (3rd)	Peter Mullan	Top of the Lake	Matt Mitcham	Episode 5: "The Dark Creator"	UKTV
**2013** (3rd)	David Wenham	Better Man	Julian McMahon	"Part 2"	SBS
**2014** (4th)
**2014** (4th)	**Eamon Farren**	**Carlotta**	**Danny / Ava**		**ABC**
**2014** (4th)	Andrew McFarlane	Devil's Playground	Father Marco Andrassi	Episode 1.5: "The Whirlwind and The Storm"	Foxtel – Showcase
**2014** (4th)	Andy Ryan	INXS: Never Tear Us Apart	Andrew Farriss	"Part 1"	Seven Network
**2014** (4th)	Daniel Wyllie	Rake	Mal	Series 3, Episode 1	ABC
**2015** (5th)
**2015** (5th)	**Ky Baldwin**	**Peter Allen: Not the Boy Next Door**	**Young Peter Allen**	**Episode 1**	**Seven Network**
**2015** (5th)	John Bach	Gallipoli	Sir Ian Hamilton	Episode 6	Nine Network
**2015** (5th)	Lachy Hulme	The Secret River	Thomas Blackwood	"Part 1"	ABC
**2015** (5th)	Rahel Romahn	The Principal	Tarek Ahmad	Episode 2	SBS
**2016** (6th)
**2016** (6th)	**Damon Herriman**	**Secret City**	**Kim Gordon**	**Episode 1: "A Donation to the Struggle"**	**Showcase**
**2016** (6th)	Russell Dykstra	Rake	Barney Meagher	Series 4, Episode 8	ABC
**2016** (6th)	Ben Gerrard	Molly	Caroline	"Part 1"	Seven Network
**2016** (6th)	Hamish Michael	Janet King – The Invisible Wound	Richard Stirling	Episode 8: "The Long Goodbye"	ABC
**2017** (7th)
**2017** (7th)	**Ewen Leslie**	**Top of the Lake: China Girl**			**Foxtel/BBC First**
**2017** (7th)	Anthony LaPaglia	Sunshine			SBS
**2017** (7th)	Matt Nable	Blue Murder: Killer Cop			Seven Network
**2017** (7th)	David Wenham	Wake in Fright			Ten Network
**2018** (8th)
**2018** (8th)	**Wayne Blair**	**Mystery Road**			
**2018** (8th)	Damien Garvey	Rake			
**2018** (8th)	Xavier Samuel	Riot			
**2018** (8th)	Dan Wyllie	Romper Stomper			
**2018** (8th)	Ashley Zukerman	Friday on My Mind			
**2019** (9th)
**2019** (9th)	**Richard Roxburgh**	**The Hunting**	Nick		
**2019** (9th)	Damon Herriman	Lambs of God	Father Bob		
**2019** (9th)	Damon Herriman	Mr Inbetween	Freddy		
**2019** (9th)	Ewen Leslie	Fighting Season	Captain Edward "Ted" Nordenfelt		
**2019** (9th)	John Stanton	Bloom	Max McKinnon		
**2020** (10th)
**2020** (10th)	**Darren Gilshenan**	**Stateless**			
**2020** (10th)	Rob Collins	Mystery Road			
**2020** (10th)	Damon Herriman	The Commons			
**2020** (10th)	Callan Mulvey	Mystery Road			
**2020** (10th)	Ed Oxenbould	Bloom			
**2021** (11th)
**2021** (11th)	**William McInnes**	**The Newsreader**			
**2021** (11th)	Harry Greenwood	Wakefield			
**2021** (11th)	Matt Nable	Mr Inbetween			
**2021** (11th)	Stephen Peacocke	The Newsreader			
**2021** (11th)	Justin Rosniak	Mr Inbetween			
**2022** (12th)
**2022** (12th)	**Thomas Weatherall**	**Heartbreak High**			
**2022** (12th)	Steve Bisley	Mystery Road: Origin			
**2022** (12th)	Brendan Cowell	The Twelve			
**2022** (12th)	Daniel Henshall	Mystery Road: Origin			
**2022** (12th)	Damon Herriman	The Tourist			

== See also ==
- AACTA Award for Best Guest or Supporting Actress in a Television Drama
- AACTA Awards
