= All Saints season 7 =

All Saints
- Season 7
- 2004 Season DVD
- No. of episodes: 40

Release
- Original network: Seven Network
- Original release: 17 February – 16 November 2004

Season chronology
- ← Previous; Season 6 Next → Season 8

The seventh season of the long-running Australian medical drama All Saints began airing on 17 February 2004 and concluded on 16 November 2004 with a total of 40 episodes.

== Plot ==
The aftermath of the shooting hangs like a dark cloud over everyone's head.

As Terri fights to save Ward 17 from permanent closure, the staff around her work through battles of their own.

Nelson finds himself in emotionally difficult territory after hitting a child on her bike with his car, and as Sterlo's drug usage worsens, he resorts to desperate measures when police come knocking.

Terri is forced to face her mortality upon being diagnosed with a rare heart tumour. The fight for Ward 17 is lost and staff that remain have a baptism by fire moving to the Emergency Department which is run by the hard-nosed Frank Campion.

Families in crisis at the hospital give both Frank and Charlotte cause to think about their own situations. Frank is struggling to deal with his autistic daughter Kathleen, and Charlotte has realised that becoming a mother is her priority however searching for a sperm donor threatens to destroy her relationship.

In romantic developments, Luke is moving to the US and Paula must decide whether to follow him. Terri finds herself looking at Jack in a new light, and Cate wonders if new Ambo Mac will ever admit his true feelings for her.

== Cast ==
=== Main cast ===
- Georgie Parker as Terri Sullivan (Note: Georgie Parker appeared in 39 of the 40 episodes in the season)
- Judith McGrath as Von Ryan (Note: Judith McGrath appeared in 35 of the 40 episodes in the season)
- Christopher Gabardi as Vincent Hughes
- Tammy MacIntosh as Charlotte Beaumont
- Paul Tassone as Nelson Curtis
- Celia Ireland as Regina Butcher (37 episodes)
- Wil Traval as Jack Quade (34 episodes, from episode 2)
- Conrad Coleby as Scott Zinenko (episodes 1–32)
- John Howard as Frank Campion (episodes 11–40)
- Natalie Saleeba as Jessica Singleton (episodes 11–40)
- Alexandra Davies as Cate McMasters (24 episodes, from episode 16)
- Henry Nixon as Sterling McCormack (episodes 1–18)
- Mark Priestley as Dan Goldman (16 episodes, from episode 24)
- Fletcher Humphrys as Alex Kearns (episodes 1–15)
- Jenni Baird as Paula Morgan (episodes 1–12)
- Martin Lynes as Luke Forlano (episodes 1–12)

=== Recurring cast ===
- Grant Bowler as Nigel 'Mac' MacPherson (12 episodes)
- Adrienne Pickering as Sophia Beaumont (9 episodes)
- Katrina Campbell as Addy (9 episodes)
- Kimberley Joseph as Grace Connelly (7 episodes)
- Jason Lee as Sean Lim (7 episodes)
- Liz Alexander as Dr Alison Newell (7 episodes)
- Anne Looby as Julia Archer (5 episodes)
- Troy Planet as Denis Pool (4 episodes)
- Roy Billing as Murray Blackwood (4 episodes)
- Trilby Beresford as Kathleen Campion (4 episodes)
- Jack Rickard as Max Morgan (3 episodes)
- Rhett Giles as Michael Plummer (3 episodes)
- Jaime Mears as Kerry Lytton (3 episodes)
- Helen Dallimore as Loretta Giorgio (2 episodes)
- Lois Ramsey as Norma Blunt (3 episodes)
- Kim Hilas as Joan Marden (2 episodes)

=== Guest cast ===
- Max Cullen as Moses (3 episodes)
- Robert Coleby as Professor Richard Craig (2 episodes)
- Emma Jackson as Megan (2 episodes)
- Elspeth Ballantyne as Anne Lytton (2 episodes)
- Josh Quong Tart as Matt Horner (1 episode)
- Rachael Coopes as Kirsten Horner (1 episode)
- Katie Spinks as Priscilla Horner (1 episode)
- Victoria Langley as Margaret O'Brien (1 episode)
- Jason Chong as Dr Oscar Wu (1 episode)
- Ray Barrett as Doc Connelly (1 episode)
- Russell Dykstra as Grant Jenkins (1 episode)
- Peter Kowitz as Ronnie Tucker (1 episode)
- Peter Rowsthorn as John Morton (1 episode)
- Edith Podesta as Lana Dawson (1 episode)
- David Koch as Elvis (1 episode)
- Melissa Tkautz as Andrea Stuart (1 episode)
- Gerard Kennedy as Neville West (1 episode)
- Bryan Marshall as Miles Gordon (1 episode)
- Leslie Dayman as Viv Woods (2 episode)

== Episodes ==
No. overall	No. in season	Title	Directed by	Written by	Original release date
255	1	"One Day at a Time"	Jean-Pierre Mignon	Sally Webb	17 February 2004
Ward 17 is under threat of closure, and Terri is forced to get by with limited means. The aftermath of the shooting still hangs like a dark cloud over everyone's head.
256	2	"Opening Up"	Catherine Roden	Harry West	17 February 2004
Terri begins the fight to save Ward 17. Regina plays cupid and spends the whole day making sure Terri can't back out of her date. Charlotte's nose is out of joint when a new young resident beats her to a diagnosis.
257	3	"Happy Families"	Geoffrey Nottage	John Banas	24 February 2004
A bucks' night prank goes horribly wrong for the Groom and Sterlo - his best man. Paula agrees to Michael having informal access to their son, Max. But Michael begins to subtly use the situation to turn the screws on Luke and Paula's relationship, whilst endearing himself to Max. While everyone thinks Sophia is Charlotte's estranged lover their real relationship is much closer.
258	4	"Wolf"	Kate Woods	John Concannon	2 March 2004
Opinions are split over the treatment of a pedophile, who has been admitted to All Saints following a violent assault. Some nurses refuse to assist in the surgery that will save the man's reproductive organs. Sophia and Charlotte find a family dispute reflects their own situation.
259	5	"In Too Deep"	Jean-Pierre Mignon	Louise Crane-Bowes	9 March 2004
Luke and Paula face their final decision as Michael makes a play for the family he wants. Sophia's lonely heart and her feelings for Vincent are revealed when she bonds with a patient who has an appointment to marry a man she met in an internet chatroom. Terri and Julia clash when Julia transfers Nelson off Ward 17.
260	6	"Peripheral Vision"	Catherine Roden	Louise Crane-Bowes	16 March 2004
Nelson finds himself in the emotionally difficult territory when a child, on her bike, shoots out in front of his car and ends up in ICU. Jack deals with a patient who wants a reversal of a tubal ligation ... without her husband's knowledge. Things reach boiling point for Nelson, when Terri turns up on his doorstep, urging him to open up to her.
261	7	"Fight or Flight"	Carla Drago	Louise Crane-Bowes	23 March 2004
Terri and Nelson find it tough to get past recent history. With help from Von and Nelson, Matt struggles to overcome a serious injury on what should be the best day of his life.
262	8	"Prison Walls"	Peter Fisk	Rick Held	30 March 2004
Nelson helps a young man confront his mother while attempting to confront his own drinking problem. Sophia nurses a menacing criminal. Charlotte and Von uncover a young woman's secret.
263	9	"Deceptions"	Jean-Pierre Mignon	Denise Morgan	6 April 2004
Terri is forced to face her mortality when she is diagnosed with a rare tumor in her heart. A man with an STD deceives his fiancee regarding his condition. Charlotte, prompted by Sophia takes matters into her own hands, clashing once more with Dr Alison Newell, this time with unexpected consequences. A terminally ill young man confronts his fear that his girlfriend only stays with him out of pity.
264	10	"A Place in the Heart"	Catherine Roden	David Hannam	13 April 2004
Terri undergoes open heart surgery to discover if her heart tumor is cancerous. The permanent closure of Ward 17 heralds the end of an era and generates much uncertainty among the nursing staff. Charlotte gets a heart-stopping induction into emergency medicine.
265	11	"Brave New World"	Catherine Millar	Sarah Walker	20 April 2004
The remaining staff of ward 17 have a baptism by fire in the emergency department, which is run by the hard-nosed Frank Campion. Sophia leads the charge for changes, only to find herself Frank's first victim. Terri shares a room with a troubled patient and teaches Jack a lesson or two.
266	12	"Bad Pennies"	Peter Zisk	John Banas	27 April 2004
Paula has to decide whether to go to the States with Luke as Terri prepares to come back to work and face the challenges presented by both her new boss and Jack Quade. Charlotte has an unusual decision to make and Scott and Alex discover that luck can be a fickle thing.
267	13	"Ground Zero"	Jean-Pierre Mignon	John Hugginson	4 May 2004
It's Terri's first day in Emergency ... a new environment, a new position and a new boss, she is at ground zero.
268	14	"Life After Death"	Catherine Roden	Kelly Lefever	11 May 2004
A senseless act of violence sees a Chinese boy left a potential organ donor - but no-one is keen on the way they have to get permission. Frank fights to do the non politically correct thing when he believes a Down's Syndrome mother should abort her child at her grandfather's behest.
269	15	"Zero Tolerance"	Catherine Millar	Sally Webb	18 May 2004
Alex witnesses a shooting and must make a moral choice which could affect the rest of his life. Charlotte's professionalism is cast into doubt when a patient's grieving parent threatens litigation. Terri continues to attract the attention of a much younger man.
270	16	"Meltdown"	Peter Fisk	Louise Crane-Bowes	25 May 2004
Tempers flare and the staff is put to the test when a contamination scare sees them all locked into the Emergency Department. Terri finds herself looking at Jack in a new light as he rises to the challenge.
271	17	"Into the Fire"	Jean-Pierre Mignon	Rick Held	1 June 2004
Sterlo resorts to desperate measures when police are called into investigating the theft of prohibited drugs. Terri and Jack deal with the awkwardness of "the morning after". Charlotte refuses to let Frank ruin the after-glow of her blossoming romance with Megan.
272	18	"Clean"	Catherine Roden	Andrew Kelly	8 June 2004
Charlotte treats a little girl who needs a bone marrow transplant and faces the difficult situation of keeping a secret - her father is not her biological father. Jack treats Josh, a ten-year-old with a mystery illness and absent parents. Sterlo collapses in the street with an infection from a dirty needle.
273	19	"Under the Skin"	Catherine Millar	Lesley Lewis & Catherine Millar	15 June 2004
Scott's demons are brought to the surface when the ambulance service is troubled by a serial hoaxer. Charlotte has to deal with a woman who blames her for the death of her son.
274	20	"Feet of Clay"	Bill Hughes	Denise Morgan	22 June 2004
Jack becomes impatient with his position in the E.D. and jumps at the chance to prove himself. But has he taken unnecessary risks? Elsewhere, Vincent meets his new Intern, Grace, and realizes there's much more to her than meets the eye.
275	21	"Pecking Order"	Jean-Pierre Mignon	John Concannon	29 June 2004
Vincent conflicts with a superior over the treatment of a young boy. A conference at the hospital has ramifications for everyone.
276	22	"Luck of the Draw"	Catherine Roden	John Hugginson	6 July 2004
Charlotte finishes her relationship with Addy when she makes a life-changing decision. Terri finally discovers the source of Frank's ongoing bad mood, but not before Frank and Jack almost come to blows in the middle of Emergency. Cate relives a painful memory when she watches one man give his life trying to save another.
277	23	"Consequences"	Catherine Millar	John Banas	13 July 2004
Families in crisis give both Frank and Charlotte pause for thought about their own domestic situations. When a badly beaten young woman is brought into the E.D. a whole family is torn apart. The traumatic events have particular resonance for Frank Campion, who is having increasing problems with his own daughter, and for Charlotte, who is desperate to have a child of her own.
278	24	"When Worlds Collide"	Bill Hughes	Susan Hore	20 July 2004
A tragic multi-vehicle accident unexpectedly brings people on different life trajectories together. Terri's offer to assist Frank in his personal crisis is met with resentment and rejection.
279	25	"Mind over Matter"	Jean-Pierre Mignon	Sally Webb	27 July 2004
A homeless man's injuries bring Terri and Jack into conflict. Scott and Cate have to deal with more than a robbery when the Ambulance is burgled. Jessica is disillusioned when Dan turns out to be a very red-blooded boy. Vincent is concerned about a surgeon's eccentricities.
280	26	"Falling From Grace"	Chris Martin-Jones	Louise Crane-Bowes	3 August 2004
Vincent elects to spend the weekend with Grace at her home, partly to help, partly because of the growing feelings he has for her. But he gets a reality check from a young patient and with a bit of his own investigation realizes that Grace and her father are not the angels he perceived them to be.
281	27	"Bad Seed"	Robert Marchand	Rick Held	10 August 2004
Terri fights to save the life of a pregnant woman and her unborn child. Jessica wrestles with the demons of post-traumatic stress. Charlotte's search for a donor threatens to destroy her newfound happiness with Addy. Cate accuses Scott of being jealous of Nigel.
282	28	"Out of Focus"	Mark Piper	Fiona Kelly	31 August 2004
The day in the life of Emergency through the eyes of a television crew brings out egos and reveals personal tensions in both staff and patients; leaving Terri to face a big decision about her future in the Department.
283	29	"Odd Couples"	Jean-Pierre Mignon	Sarah Walker	31 August 2004
Various couples in the ED are at odds with each other - Terri and Jack are on the rocks following Nelson and Frank's discovery of their affair. Scott is shocked when he finds that Cate has requested a new partner. When a prison van is involved in an accident, Jessica bonds with an injured nurse, bringing her into conflict with Dan who's concerned she's getting too involved with her patient.
284	30	"Benefit of the Doubt"	Chris Martin-Jones	David Hannam & Sarah Walker	7 September 2004
Terri's relationship with Jack looks too broken to fix as she takes over from Nelson as NUM of Emergency. When Jack intervenes on Jessica's behalf when she has a minor dispute with Terri, Terri resents Jack's interference and the end of their relationship is nigh. Regina is finding it difficult to cope with the new pressures she faces in ED.
285	31	"Don't Look Back"	Bill Hughes	Sue Hore	14 September 2004
A reckless moment between Charlotte and Jack forces them to face how much they stand to lose if their secret ever gets out. Conflict returns between Frank and Vincent over a pregnant Down's Syndrome girl. Frank's personal life influences Von to make a life-altering decision. Jack tries to win Terri back by using a young car crash patient's relationship with his older wife as his inspiration.
286	32	"Karma"	Mark Piper	John Hugginson	21 September 2004
Nelson's life is turned upside down when he drinks alcohol and has no recollection of what he did the night before. Vincent continues to grieve over Grace. Cate tries to figure out what her real feelings are for Scott.
287	33	"Panic Stations"	Jean-Pierre Mignon	Kelly Lefever	28 September 2004
All Saints is caught in a wave of hysteria when a cyanide 'spill' fills the ER with patients and makes it hard to tell who the real patients are from those panicking. Dan discovers Jessica's secret. Mac is anxious about his forthcoming dinner with his prospective in-laws and Charlotte has good reason to feel anxious - she's pregnant.
288	34	"Three Strikes"	Chris Martin-Jones	Charlie Strachan	5 October 2004
Charlotte is pushed to the brink when Frank puts pressure on her career and she's faced with telling Jack about the baby. Terri has to make a decision when Regina makes a claim of unfair dismissal. Dan intrigues Jessica when he becomes personally involved while treating a disturbed young girl.
289	35	"Out on a Limb"	Shawn Seet	Sally Webb	12 October 2004
Frank volunteers Jack and Terri to help when passengers and crew of a cruise ship are stricken with food poisoning. Cate and Mac investigate an underaged girl working at a brothel. Nelson puts himself further at odds with the ED staff by being overzealous in his new role as Staff Educator. Regina's first day back as Ward Clerk in the ED is not without its tensions.
290	36	"The Extra Mile"	Peter Fisk	Louise Crane-Bowes	19 October 2004
Charlotte's dedication to a patient may have dire consequences for her career. Dan and Nelson come to a new understanding. Vincent learns of Jessica's feelings for him.
291	37	"On the Brink"	Tony Tilse	Louise Crane-Bowes	26 October 2004
Mac and Cate are entrapped by a desperate gunman. The gunman's wounded victim wins Vincent's trust. Von returns to work with a new and unsettling attitude.
292	38	"The Last Resort"	Catherine Millar	Lesley Lewis	2 November 2004
Charlotte's concern about her unborn baby makes her confide in Nelson, and ultimately realize where her priorities really lie. A serious car accident in which a young man is impaled in his car provides a welcome distraction for Cate and Mac who are unwilling to deal with the issue of their growing feelings towards each other.
293	39	"Cries for Help"	Shawn Seet	Sean Nash	9 November 2004
Von is forced to deal with the residual grief from her sister's death when she tries to help a young boy and his mum come to terms with a family tragedy. The sexual secrets of the All Saints staff are highlighted when a man who has been unfaithful tries so hard to conceal his guilt that it almost costs him his life.
294	40	"The Season to be Jolly"	Catherine Roden	Sarah Walker	16 November 2004
Jack discovers Charlotte is pregnant with his child. Will it end the blissful new beginning he has found with Terri? Mac finally admits his true feelings for Cate. Dan finds himself compromised by an affair with a doctor when he suspects she is making fatal mistakes.
