= All Saints season 6 =

All Saints
- Season 6
- Season 6 cast
- No. of episodes: 43

Release
- Original network: Seven Network
- Original release: 11 February – 25 November 2003

Season chronology
- ← Previous; Season 5 Next → Season 7

The sixth season of the long-running Australian medical drama All Saints began airing on 11 February 2003 and concluded on 25 November 2003 with a total of 43 episodes.

== Plot ==
Bron and Ben's big day has arrived and despite his nerves and the unwelcome arrival of her father, they finally make it to the altar. Their beautiful wedding is the first of many for All Saints staff in 2003, a year of love, loss, and new beginnings. In blossoming relationships, Regina gets a date with the florist of her dreams and Matt falls for a patient, unaware of what is wrong with her. Luke tries endlessly to impress Paula's young son Max however it seems he can do no right.

Mitch's erratic behavior and increasing deafness bring him and a worried Terri to loggerheads until Mitch undergoes tests uncovering that his recent symptoms are the sign of something far worse than either of them had imagined. Special requests are being made of the doctors at All Saints, and their response will change lives and lead to explosive conflict on Ward 17. Tragically, as Christmas approaches an obsessive gunman embarks on a shooting spree, stalking through the hospital. The year brings teary farewells for two of All Saints' much loved and long serving staff as Bron and Mitch say goodbye forever.

== Cast ==
All cast correct to the opening credit block

=== Main cast ===
- Georgie Parker as Terri Sullivan
- Jenni Baird as Paula Morgan
- Natasha Beaumont as Rebecca Green (episodes 1–24)
- Conrad Coleby as Scott Zinenko (37 episodes)
- Christopher Gabardi as Vincent Hughes (episodes 12–43)
- Fletcher Humphrys as Alex Kearns (36 episodes, from episode 7)
- Celia Ireland as Regina Butcher
- Martin Lynes as Luke Forlano
- Tammy MacIntosh as Charlotte Beaumont
- Judith McGrath as Von Ryan
- Rachel McNamara as Frances Regan (25 episodes, from episodes 17 to 42)
- Henry Nixon as Sterling McCormack (episodes 10–43)
- Josh Quong Tart as Matt Horner (23 episodes, until episode 35)
- Libby Tanner as Bronwyn Markham (8 episodes, until episode 10)
- Ben Tari as Jared Levine (23 episodes, until episode 24)
- Paul Tassone as Nelson Curtis
- Erik Thomson as Mitch Stevens (episodes 1–10)
- Brian Vriends as Ben Markham (episodes 1–7)

=== Special Guest cast ===
- Angela Punch McGregor as Carmen Shaw (6 episodes)
- Victoria Langley as Margaret O'Brien (2 episodes)
- Brett Climo as Dr. Malcolm Pussle (2 episodes)
- Robert Coleby as Prof. Richard Craig (1 episode)

=== Recurring cast ===
- Rochelle Whyte as Cara Windom (18 episodes)
- David Downer as Colin Blackburn (13 episodes)
- Alan Flower as Morris the Florist (12 episodes)
- Genevieve O'Reilly as Leanne Curtis (10 episodes)
- Jack Rickard as Max Morgan (10 episodes)
- Penne Hackforth-Jones as Nicola Hartley (8 episodes)
- Nick Flint as Angus Drummond (7 episodes)
- Brett Stiller as Greg Roberts (7 episodes)
- Rachael Coopes as Kirsten Sutton (6 episodes)
- John Noble as Alan Madsen (6 episodes)
- Anne Looby as Julia Archer (5 episodes)
- Kate Sheil as Victoria Carlton (5 episodes)
- Emma Coppin as Lucy Stevens (5 episodes)
- Ben Tomkins as Jeff Carson (5 episodes)
- Joy Smithers as Rose Stevens (4 episodes)
- Jessica Gower as Harriet Stapleton (4 episodes)
- Lisa Flanagan as Chloe Hanson (4 episodes)
- Kim Hillas as Joan Marden (4 episodes)
- Victoria Thaine as Sasha Netterfield (3 episodes)
- Drayton Morley as Fred Netterfield (3 episodes)
- Rohan Nichol as Aaron Collingwood (3 episodes)
- Olivia Brown as Kendra Blackburn (3 episodes)
- Diane Richards as Vera Fleming (3 episodes)
- Melanie DeFerranti as Madeline Fleming (3 episodes)

=== Guest cast ===
- Travis Chapman as Charlie Green (3 episodes)
- Helmut Bakaitis as Sal Forlano (3 episodes)
- Sam O’Dell as Wayne Dunstan (3 episodes)
- Robyn Forsythe as Collette Pullman (2 episodes)
- Bevan Wilson as Prof. Walter Thomas (2 episodes)
- Patrick Thompson as Paul Stevens (2 episodes)
- Bartholomew John as Lindsay Green (2 episodes)
- Anne Grigg as Sonia Green (2 episodes)
- Beth Weston as Maureen Smith (2 episodes)
- Barry Quin as Dr Simon Byrne (2 episodes)
- Maggie Dence as June Markham (2 episodes)
- Troy Planet as Denis Pool (2 episodes)
- Liz Alexander as Dr. Alison Newell (2 episodes)
- Abigail Bianca as Miranda Maloney (2 episodes)
- Amelia Longhurst as Kerry Randle (2 episodes)
- Kathryn Hartman as Sue Everett (2 episodes)
- Rohan Mack as Tom Everett (2 episodes)
- Jack O’Shea as Brock Everett (2 episodes)
- Christopher Pitman as Rick Forlano (1 episode)
- Eliza Logan as Danielle Markham (1 episode)
- Margie McRae as Catherine Craig (1 episode)
- Terence Crawford as John O'Brien (1 episode)
- Bronte Doherty as Cassie O'Brien (1 episode)
- Melissa Jaffer as Eileen Sullivan (1 episode)
- Penny Pedersen as Glinda Moss (1 Episode)

== Episodes ==
No. overall	No. in season	Title	Directed by	Written by	Original release date	Australian viewers (millions)
212	1	"Trust"	Scott Feeney	Sarah Walker	11 February 2003	1.40
Despite a brawl at his bucks' night and her unwelcome father, Ben and Bron make it to the altar and get married. The new intern, Dr. Angus Drummond goes head-to-head with Mitch over a patient with amyloidosis. Rebecca catches Scott kissing another girl and warns him to never cheat on her again. Terri becomes concerned about Mitch's drinking habits which causes her to relive her father's abuse. Nelson gives Leanne money for shoes on the proviso she turns up at an AA meeting.
213	2	"Heroic Measures"	Catherine Roden	Sam Meikle	11 February 2003	1.40
Scott puts his life and job on the line to save the passengers of a car that plunged off a bridge into a river. Rebecca's disabled brother Charlie is admitted to hospital with appendicitis, revealing some deep cracks in the Green family. Angus accuses Mitch of giving a diabetes patient a heparin overdose, causing a drift between Mitch, Charlotte and Terri. A wheelchair has Nelson taking on the new maintenance man, Dennis and when he takes matters into his own hands, Dennis ends up with a prolapsed disc.
214	3	"Destiny's Child"	Aarne Neeme	Denise Morgan & Phillip Dalkin	18 February 2003	1.46
After feeling unwell and going to the doctor, Paula discovers she's pregnant with Ben's baby. When an ultrasound is conducted, Paula finds out the baby is seriously deformed and has an abortion. Terri and an increasingly deaf Mitch are at loggerheads when she sees him arguing with a casual nurse, that he sees as Rose. Ben and Luke disagree over a decision Luke makes which results in the death of a young girl. Nelson is given a promotion in the ED and tells Leanne to move out. Bron tells Ben to take the promotion.
215	4	"Broken English"	Geoffrey Nottage	Andrew Kelly	25 February 2003	1.37
Mitch's takes a drastic turn when he hits Terri in a drunken rage. Terri stays at Margaret's for the night and when Mitch discovers where she his, he punches John. When he undergoes a CT scan, Mitch and Terri discover he has a massive tumour occupying his brain. Charlotte gains the trust of a Polish man and discovers the horrible living conditions in the boarding house where he is staying. Paula is blamed for a minor neurological procedure going horribly wrong and Luke tries his hardest to cheer her up.
216	5	"All Our Tomorrows"	Scott Hartford-Davis	Sally Webb	4 March 2003	1.38
Charlotte is faced with an extraordinarily tough decision when her dog mauls one of the neighbourhood kids and Nelson informs the police. The day of Mitch's biopsy arrives and the tragic results arrive: Mitch's brain tumour is inoperable and he is going to die. Regina continues to fob Morris off, even though everyone in Ward 17 can see what he is trying to do. Luke and Paula's friendship grows deeper when he buys Max a bunny.
217	6	"Older & Wiser"	Julian Pringle	Chris Corbett	11 March 2003	1.31
When Luke's father, Sal is admitted to hospital after being involved in a two-car collision, Paula discovers that Luke wants more than a friendship. On Ben's last day, he and Scott take different sides over confliction accounts of the collision. A depressed Mitch returns to work and puts Terri in a difficult position, but he later bonds with Angus over a couple of beers. Bron urges Jared to apply for her 2IC job as her departure becomes imminent.
218	7	"Separation Pains"	Peter Fisk	John Concannon	18 March 2003	1.27
Nelson applies for the NUM job in the ED but, at the last minute, tells Joan Marden he doesn't want it. Bron spends her last day with Luke, treating a man who has had his arm amputated. Terri is left heartbroken when Mitch announces that he is going to freeze a sperm sample and finalises his will. Scott trains the new ambulance officer Alex, but their day turns chaotic when Scott is poisoned. Terri and Charlotte clash over a woman's decision about a hysterectomy. Charlotte and Bron have a hard time saying goodbye to each other.
219	8	"The Last Supper"	Jean-Pierre Mignon	Sarah Walker	25 March 2003	1.32
After deciding to have the operation, Luke and Mitch argue over the surgery. Mitch suffers his first seizure and is later surprised when Terri takes him out for lunch. To his surprise, she has lined up a celebrant and with Paul and Von present, Terri and Mitch get married. Rebecca nurses a man whose son has been missing since the boating accident that injured him. Charlotte learns that love never dies. Scott helps Alex come to terms with the differences between the city and country. Regina realises that Morris has a crush on her.
220	9	"Only the Good Die Young"	Scott Hartford-Davis	Louise Crane-Bowes	1 April 2003	1.45
Emotions run high as the day of Mitch's operation arrives. When Luke and the Professor open Mitch up, they discover that they can remove the whole tumour and do so. Paula and Charlotte work on a patient who tried to asphyxiate himself and his son. Mitch awakens after his operation and Terri and he pronounce their love for each other, however he later goes into cardiac arrest. Charlotte, Nelson, Luke, Von and Jared try everything, but he dies.
221	10	"Vale"	Chris Martin-Jones	John Banas	8 April 2003	1.41
The All Saints family gather to farewell Mitch Stevens. Emotions run high and tempers bubble over as the funeral of Mitch sees Bron's surprise return, as well as Rose's arrival and her "black widow" act. The new nurse, Sterlo makes enemies with the orderlies and they go on strike and Nelson discovers his secret: Colin Blackburn is his uncle. At the wake, Rose makes a few enemies and forgives Terri. Scott invites Sterlo to live with him, Jared and Rebecca. Rebecca cheats on Scott and sleeps with Jared.
222	11	"The Art of Flowers"	Geoff Bennett	David Hannam	15 April 2003	1.40
Terri isn't coping with grief over Mitch's death and after a dispute with Carmen, her neighbour, she discovers that her landlord has evicted her. Rebecca feels guilty after sleeping with Jared and when Scott supports her after a crisis with Charlie, she becomes even more guilty. After an awkward start, Sterlo saves a patient's life and in the process, bonds well with Charlotte. Matt returns to the hospital as an orderly. Paula, Luke and Von go out for dinner and Regina scores a date with Morris the Florist.
223	12	"Fanning the Flames"	Jean-Pierre Mignon	Denise Morgan	22 April 2003	1.30
A grieving Terri spends the night outside and is admitted to hospital with a bout of pneumonia. Matt meets an attractive patient, Kirsten and falls for her, but later learns her secret. Von and Luke both sit exams, however during the break between her two tests, Von is forced to save a lady after she is hit by a car. Scott acts as Alex's love helper, but the results aren't quite what either of them hoped for. Charlotte's ex-husband Vincent begins working at All Saints.
224	13	"Breathing Space"	Shawn Seet	Phillip Dalkin	29 April 2003	1.33
Terri stuns Nelson when she calls him and tells him she has resigned. Luke is shattered when he discovers that a job that was promised to him is now up for consideration. Jared puts Matt and Kirsten's blossoming romance to the test when he involves Matt in the care of a cancer patient. Vincent struggles to get to the bottom of an ovarian cyst patient's halitosis. Terri discovers the shocking truth about Carmen. Regina's flower design puts Von and Sterlo offside and they decide it has to go.
225	14	"Past Tense"	Scott Hartford-Davis	Sally Webb	6 May 2003	1.36
Vincent clashes with Terri, on her first day back, over a heart transplant patient who has a broken leg. Nelson and Von go out of their way to shield Terri from a brain tumour patient. Sterlo is accused of having an affair with the mother of one of the Under Seven's footy players he coaches. Jared interferes in Scott and Rebecca's relationship. Leanne Curtis starts working at the hospital making life difficult for Nelson and Jared. Paula and Luke share a kiss.
226	15	"Seeking Asylum"	Geoff Bennett	Sarah Walker	13 May 2003	1.36
Luke tries his hardest to bond with Max for Paula's sake. A case of tuberculosis hits a nerve with Vincent and he finally divulges the truth about his ex-wife Karen to Charlotte. Alex's girlfriend Chloe accidentally cuts off a lady's earlobe. Leanne's addition to the Ward 17 staff continues to shake the staff as Sterlo finds out that Jared was raped. Regina is traumatised when she is sexually assaulted and Terri fights with Colin and Vincent over Malcolm.
227	16	"In Control"	Carla Drago	Lesley Lewis	20 May 2003	1.42
Scott and Alex are horrified to find Rebecca's parents Lindsay and Sonya in a car accident. Rebecca violates hospital policy by stealing and wasting her father's blood alcohol sample. Luke continues to push football onto Max and Sterlo comes to work with a bruised rib. Terri and Charlotte break the rules by visiting Carmen outside of hospital and Colin finds out. Matt uncovers the truth about Kirsten. Leanne turns to alcohol after Nelson snubs her.
228	17	"Best Intentions"	Geoffrey Nottage	John Concannon	27 May 2003	1.48
A woman revisits a childhood nightmare after she is involved in a car accident with her son and she refuses to believe nursing staff that he has survived. Terri's plans for her neighbour, Carmen, end in disaster when she is transferred into the Psych Ward.
229	18	"Night Moves"	Catherine Roden	John Banas	3 June 2003	1.50
At the All Saints Annual Charity Ball, hearts are won and lost and Terri discovers that she may have misjudged Vincent Hughes. In the ward, Von confronts an enemy and comes face-to-face with the tragic fate of a woman whose life she has saved.
230	19	"Sins of the Past"	Bill Hughes	Louise Crane-Bowes	10 June 2003	1.54
Terri makes a serious mistake when she assumes she knows what her patient needs. Nelson and Jared disagree on how to best deal with a suicide attempt.
231	20	"No Place Like Home"	Peter Fisk	Sarah Walker	17 June 2003	1.55
Everyone at the hospital is talking about the death of Rose Stevens, and what could have pushed her to take the final step.
232	21	"Presumption of Guilt"	Geoffrey Nottage	Peter Neale	24 June 2003	1.54
Terri's enjoyable week playing mum to Lucy, while Victoria is in hospital, comes to an abrupt end when she is questioned by the police. It seems that Terri was the last person to visit.
233	22	"A Rock and a Hard Place"	Catherine Roden	Denise Morgan	1 July 2003	1.44
Terri is locked up at the local police station after being charged with the murder of Rose. She languishes in the cell throughout the night and the next day. Her co-worker and friend Von battles to come up with the bail money.
234	23	"The Things We Do For Love"	Bill Hughes	Peter Dalkin & Peter Neale	8 July 2003	1.48
It's becoming obvious to Jared that Leanne is an alcoholic. Her behaviour is getting worse and it's affecting her work, but what can he do about it? Treatment of a disturbed ex-navy man frustrates Vincent when the Navy won't take responsibility for his serious psychological problems.
235	24	"Suspicious Minds"	Scott Hartford-Davis	David Hannam	15 July 2003	1.51
Vincent becomes entangled in Rose Stevens' murder investigation. Even his ex-wife, Dr. Beaumont, is starting to have some doubts about him. A promotion at the hospital is shifting Luke's career into top gear, but his love-life takes a dive when he does everything wrong on a dinner date with the lovely Paula.
236	25	"Now You See Me"	Aarne Neeme	Sally Webb	22 July 2003	1.37
The investigation into Rose Stevens' murder reaches a dramatic conclusion. Extraordinary circumstances force Terri and Vincent to make a new beginning. A young, blind man fears that the operation to restore his sight will fail.
237	26	"A Second Look"	Catherine Roden	Loraine Rogers	29 July 2003	1.38
At a run down city club, an off-duty female All Saints staff member is given illegal party drugs, in her drink, causing her to foolishly dance in front of lusting male club goers. Charlotte's professional standing is damaged when she turns up in emergency, apparently under the influence and behaving inappropriately. Paula and Luke reconcile after Max is hit by a car. Von realises that Nelson is secretly carrying a torch for Terri.
238	27	"Some You Win..."	Bill Hughes	John Banas	5 August 2003	1.32
The usually gruff nursing sister Von Ryan has been doing everything she can to help a seriously ill patient and her daughter. But her world is shattered when the patient dies and the autopsy indicates Von may have been negligent in her care.
239	28	"Eyes Wide Open"	Scott Hartford-Davis	Rick Held	12 August 2003	1.31
Matt freaks out when the body he's just delivered to the morgue suddenly "wakes up". Pronounced dead in emergency, the woman named Ellen gives Matt the fright of his life when she opens her eyes on the slab.
240	29	"Friends in Need"	Peter Fisk	John Concannon	19 August 2003	1.33
Terri is put in the middle when Von clashes with a visitor. Charlotte gets a black eye and shows a fiercely independent streak, in contrast to Vincent's care. Sterlo reveals a little about his family when stuck with an obnoxious patient. Scott and Alex discover the joys of golf.
241	30	"Too Close for Comfort"	Geoffrey Nottage	Louise Crane-Bowes	26 August 2003	1.31
Three years after a bomb caused injury and chaos in the medical centre adjacent to All Saints General Hospital, another huge explosive device is set off by a disgruntled patient. This time, the bomb goes off in the hospital car park. As well as the immediate victims, there are ramifications for many in Ward 17.
242	31	"Complicity"	Andrew Prowse	Andrew Kelly	2 September 2003	1.28
The husband of Charlotte's ex-lover, Liz, dies of pneumonia. Liz asks Charlotte to make out the death certificate. But tongues soon begin to wag around All Saints Western General about the man's sudden death-and his wife's relationship with Charlotte.
243	32	"The Devil to Pay"	Bill Hughes	Denise Morgan	9 September 2003	1.25
When Matt discovers a dumped baby, little does he realise that he might be accused of being the child's father. Matt's day goes from bad to worse when he learns that he and Kristen are expecting a baby which Kristen may decide not to keep. Terri faces an administrative crisis when a young athlete develops a multi-resistant strain of staph.
244	33	"Wrong Call"	Scott Hartford-Davis	Sarah Walker	16 September 2003	1.24
Luke makes a life or death decision that results in a family tragedy which is likely to haunt him for a long, long time. When patient Charlie Ellis returns to the ward, Nelson and Terri clash over his treatment. Regina, trying to help a patient, makes a near-fatal mistake.
245	34	"To Forgive, Divine"	Geoffrey Nottage	Anthony Ellis & Rick Held	23 September 2003	1.30
When a bone marrow donor withdraws her consent, Terri and Charlotte battle to save her sister's life. Luke donates a kidney to his father, Sal. Alex is bitten by a deadly snake.
246	35	"Question of Guilt"	Bill Hughes	John Banas	30 September 2003	1.24
The day Von Ryan has been dreading is finally here. Walking into the courtroom for the trial of the civil suit against her, Von is confronted by Madeline Fleming, the young woman who is clearly out for revenge over the death of her mother. Madeline's lawyer does a fine job of putting Von in the worst light possible.
247	36	"Safety Net"	Andrew Prowse	Peter Neale & Suzanne Hawley	7 October 2003	1.24
The tension is palpable in Ward 17. The emergency department is in chaos, and there isn't a spare bed in the ward and Terri is under pressure to make room on her floor by discharging patients. With stress levels rising, Terri finds herself at loggerheads with Nelson over the discharge of a patient.
248	37	"Look Before You Leap"	Catherine Roden	Sam Meikle	14 October 2003	1.18
Alex's new temporary ambo partner, Harri, catches Sterlo's eye as they try to help Troy Davies, a young man coming to terms with his girlfriend's amnesia after a fall from a cliff. Vincent comes into conflict with his senior, Mr Madsen, over his treatment of car bomb blast victim, Lauren Wellham, when she returns to All Saints.
249	38	"Doctor of Choice"	Geoffrey Nottage	Sally Webb & Chris Hawkshaw	21 October 2003	1.11
Things have quickly turned passionate between Alex Kearns and his gorgeous and feisty new ambo partner, Harri Stapleton. The pair are indulging in yet another steamy moment when work suddenly calls. Attending to a patient suffering severe abdominal pains, the situation takes a dangerous turn when the patient attacks Alex and then runs off with the young ambo's supply of morphine.
250	39	"Harm's Way"	Bill Hughes	Alex Pope	28 October 2003	1.31
Arriving home from a long night at work, Dr Charlotte Beaumont is stunned when she finds Sasha, the troubled girl she has taken into her home, lying on the ground covered in blood. Sasha, who is clearly in a terrible state, says she has been raped. Charlotte rushes her to emergency, and Sasha is later admitted to Ward 17.
251	40	"Other People's Business"	Jean-Pierre Mignon	Graham Richards	4 November 2003	1.23
Von and Nelson have to work out how they are going to live and work together. Charlotte deals with a relative who feels his father is being used as a medical "guinea pig". Alex has trouble dealing with Harri's increasingly inappropriate behaviour.
252	41	"The Right Thing?"	Catherine Roden	Denise Morgan	11 November 2003	1.20
When Charlotte discovers hospital cleaner Greg Roberts with a wound to his head, she has no reason to doubt his story that he was involved in a fight with another cleaner. Even when Greg refuses to be taken into the hospital, saying he is worried he will be fired, Charlotte's suspicions are not aroused.
253	42	"Loser Pays"	Geoffrey Nottage	Tim Pye	25 November 2003	1.40
Greg Roberts gives Charlotte a moral headache when he assaults a patient who has robbed the ward of pethidine. Paula bonds with a woman who is looking after a husband with dementia. Luke asks Paula to marry him and she has to break the news that she never got around to divorcing Max's father, Michael.
254	43	"Never Forget"	Peter Fisk	David Hannam	25 November 2003	1.40
Charlotte puts her life on the line to lure Greg away from Ward 17 after he's shot Morris, Sterlo and Kurt. Alone in the tea room, Greg explains his need to see her. He's got a gift for her. He puts his gun to her head, telling her this is something nobody will ever forget.

== DVD release ==
Season 6 DVD

All Saints – 2003 Season
Set details	Special features	
43 episodes; 11-disc set; 1.78:1 aspect ratio; English (Dolby Digital 5.1); M (recommended for mature audiences: mature themes, sexual references and coarse language)	N/A	
Release Dates
Region 1	Region 2	Region 4
—	—	2 March 2011
