= List of All Saints characters =

This is a List of All Saints characters featuring all the main/permanent character, as well as the actors that portrayed them and a brief character synopsis, relating to the Australian medical drama All Saints.

== Main Cast ==
Character	Actor	Position	Duration	Episodes
Jazmina Hillerman	Sam Healy	Ward Clerk	February 1998 – April 1999	001–052
Jaz was the only main cast member on All Saints that did not have a medical profession. She was also the first main cast member to leave the show. Jaz was the ward clerk on Ward 17. She was date raped by her boyfriend Danny and fell pregnant, choosing to have an abortion. After coming face to face with her rapist again after he tried to commit suicide, she decided to go back to TAFE (Technical and Further Education) and get her HSC (Higher School Certificate) so she could get on with her life.
Dr. Peter Morrison	Andrew McKaige	Senior Psychiatric Registrar	February 1998 – April 1999	001–053
Peter was a close friend of Terri's, and one of the hospital's psychiatrists. His wife was in a car accident the day they were going to take a holiday together; she died a few weeks later in the ICU. He and Sophie Williams bonded as they had each lost a spouse. When she kissed him, he resisted because he realized he had feelings for Terri. He ended up temporarily disabled after Sophie accidentally shot him while he was struggling to get a gun away from her before she committed suicide. Terri stayed at his house and helped him and look after his children after he was released from hospital. After struggling for a while, he seemed to be well on the way to recovery and resigned, deciding to head up north to visit his parents.
Stephanie Markham	Kirrily White	Registered Nurse, Ward 17 2IC	February 1998 – July 2000, May 2001	001–106, 142
Steph was Terri's 2IC in Ward 17. She was very controlling and liked to have everything in order, like her mother. Steph was married to ambulance officer Ben Markham for several years, and didn't want children although he did. She also wanted to become a doctor, and was studying to further her education. She was very focused on her career and her patients. She fell pregnant, although it ended up being an ectopic pregnancy which required surgery to remove. She was not sad when she lost the baby, and later felt guilty over this. She and Ben split up for a brief period because of her telling him she didn't know if she ever wanted a baby and wanted to focus on her career, and him wanting to start a family. Steph went on one awkward date with Luke and eventually got back together with Ben. Later on Steph changed her mind and was more eager to have a baby, but ended up having a miscarriage. Steph was set to be in charge of Ward 17 for several months when Terri went on a retreat; however, on the second day into her new role, she died in a terrible car accident. Ben and his partner were the ambos called out to the scene. Steph later appeared to Ben in a dream.
Connor Costello	Jeremy Cumpston	Registered Nurse, Ward 17 2IC	February 1998 – September 2001	001–157
Connor was a nurse in Ward 17 and later became 2IC, and NUM in Terri's absence, after Steph's death. He was briefly the NUM of Ward 12 before coming back to Ward 17. Some of the Ward 12 staff disliked that he wanted to admit patients that weren't gastro patients (that ward's specialty) and accused him of trying to turn them into another "garbage ward." While he was NUM on that ward, he learned how to use the very frustrating "Nurse Manager 300" computer program that Ward 17 had so much trouble with. Connor lived with his two best friends, Bron and Jared for several years. Connor was in love with Bron, for many years before he decided to tell her; however, she did not feel the same way. Connor eventually fell in love with ward clerk Jodi Horner and she followed him to England after he went over there for a job opportunity.
Bronwyn Craig	Libby Tanner	Registered Nurse, Ambulance Officer	February 1998 – April 2003	001–218
Bron started as a nurse on Ward 17. She was the girl who always had a new boyfriend before having a fling with Luke. After they were discovered they stopped seeing each other for a while, but eventually got back together. Bron had a gambling addiction and seemed to always be behind on paying her share of the rent. Bron's relationship with her father renowned cardiac surgeon Richard Craig is very antagonistic. He claimed to be disappointed that she was "just a nurse" which he considered a waste. After a deal with her father (who is working on the ward in season 2), where he agreed to operate on a patient with HIV in exchange for her leaving the ward, Bron left Ward 17 and became a paramedic working alongside Ben Markham. It was eventually revealed that Bron's father didn't believe her when, as a child, Bron told him that her uncle molested her. Several seasons later, this uncle is being rushed to emergency surgery after being brutally attacked in prison, and begs Bron and his daughter for forgiveness. Bron forgives him because she doesn't want to keep living with the hate she has for him. Richard overhears this and calmly responds to Bron that "he saw now that she wasn't lying as a child, but she should have just stayed quiet about it." While working as an ambo, Bron also worked as an Agency Nurse picking up extra shifts to earn more money. She started dating Luke again, and he paid her rent since she was usually behind on payments due to her addiction of betting on horse races at the TAB. At one point Bron's credit card was declined and she watched as the horse she was going to bet on won; it would have paid out $20,000. For a while, Bron was able to stop her betting, but later met a patient who got her in touch with a bookie who gave a lot of credit. Ben and Bron became close friends, and after Steph died, Bron started spending more time with him. This, and finding out she was betting on the races again when he thought she had stopped led Luke to break up with her. He was petty about the gambling and told her he gave her the money for rent, not gambling and wanted her to pay him back. Bron got in a massive amount of debt to her bookie and when she couldn't pay him back immediately, he demanded that she steal pethidine from the hospital. Bron took the ampules from the box, but didn't give them to the bookie. She eventually told Ben what was going on, and he paid off her debt. Ben and Bron started dating, and Bron got a tip on the horse races from a patient who was involved in fixing races; she bet a lot of money and won. Bron threw a celebration for Ben and gave him the money and a watch, but after finding out where the money came from, he refused it and walked away. Bron tried to explain that this situation was different because it was a sure thing, but Ben didn't want to hear it. Ben and Bron eventually talked things through and decided to give things a go. Eventually they got engaged. Bron took some time off before the wedding and headed overseas. When she came back, she eventually told Ben that she had an affair in the UK; Ben felt betrayed and called off the engagement. During this time, Bron was still in love with Ben, and Ben (who had always wanted children) started dating OR nurse Paula who has a son, Max. (Paula looked a lot like Ben's dead wife, Steph.) Ben was in an accident and when he woke up in ICU asked for Bron. Ben eventually called off his romance with Paula as he was obviously still in love with Bron, and they got re-engaged and married. Ben was offered a promotion elsewhere, so they both left All Saints and moved to the country. Bron returned for Mitch's funeral a few weeks later.
Ben Markham	Brian Vriends	Ambulance Officer	February 1998 – March 2003	001–218
Ben was an ambulance officer (ambo) who was married to Stephanie, but always had a soft spot for Bronwyn. He suffered traumatic stress disorder from his job and eventually got help for it. He and Bron worked together as ambos for several years. After Stephanie died, he and Bron eventually got together. Before the engagement, Bron went on a trip by herself and cheated on Ben. After Ben found out, he broke things off with Bron and jumped into a relationship with Paula. After an accident that sent him to the ICU, Ben woke up and asked for Bron. He realized that he was still in love with her and he and Paula broke things off. Around this time Paula discovered that she was pregnant by Ben, but had to terminate because the fetus was ancephalic. Ben and Bron patched things up and got married. Soon after this, he got a promotion in the country, so they moved away.
Jared Levine	Ben Tari	Registered Nurse	February 1998 – July 2003, August 2005	001–235, 320
Jared was initially introduced as a medical student, and decided to stick with nursing. He was an uptight nurse who came from a wealthy background, a fact which Connor riled him about mercilessly. He was also quite naïve when it came to patients with drug problems. He nursed a young patient who came in with drug overdoses several times always believing that she had kicked that habit. He gave her money on various occasions, got her a job as a janitor at the hospital, and even let her stay at the house he shared with his flatmates, which they were not at all happy with. Jared had an on-again, off-again fiancé but she left him after he had an HIV scare. He later had a relationship with surgical intern Kylie Preece. Jared's father was arrested for fraud and Jared lost access to the family money. As a result, he started dangerously overworking himself, picking up agency shifts whenever he could. He is eventually called out by Kate who puts a stop to it. Jared eventually began work with Mitch Stevens in the addiction clinic he started at All Saints until it was burned down. While working for the clinic, he was raped by an addict while trying to follow up with clients living on the streets. Jared contracted gonorrhea from this attack, and finally admitted what happened and started to process the situation. He left All Saints to work in a drug addiction clinic at St. Angeles that was named after Mitch Stevens. He eventually reappeared in a small cameo as the new partner of Nelson's ex-wife, Leanne; they were about to have a baby.
Dr. Luciano 'Luke' Forlano	Martin Lynes	Surgical Registrar	February 1998 – April 2004	001–266
Luke was an ambitious young surgical registrar who had an on again/off again relationship with Bron, and later on a "friends with benefits" arrangement with (the second) hospital CEO Claudia MacKenzie. He then fell in love with OR nurse Paula and tried very hard to get along with her son. After a few rough starts, they worked things out and they left to be married and work overseas when Luke got a job offer in the United States. In between, he got mixed up with a dodgy underworld family, the O'Connells. Luke treated "Ma" O'Connell when she was in the hospital and as a "thank-you" for being straight with her, she had "Pa" O'Connell (who was in prison) look out for Luke's brother, Ricky, who was also incarcerated. Later in the series, Ricky was brought into hospital, and learned that Pa O'Connell had died and Ricky was being beaten. Luke made a deal with "Ma" to have Ricky protected until his release, and because of that was called in to do several "favours" for her. When Ma was later admitted with terminal cancer, she asked Luke to kill her and offered him a lot of money. He refused, so she asked Ricky. There was later an inquest into her death. Luke's father was also involved with shady characters and is stabbed when gangsters show up at his garage wanting repayment for a loan. Ricky was working there at the time and was also attacked; he later dies. Luke donates a kidney to his father and saves him.
Therese 'Terri' Sullivan	Georgie Parker	Registered Nurse, Ward 17 N.U.M., E.D. N.U.M., Christian Nun	February 1998 – June 2005	001–313
Terri was the major character in the early years and the whole premise of the show was about her adjustment to working in a hospital as a nun. Throughout the years, she shed the chains of sisterhood. This was gradual starting with her doing so much work as a NUM that she was missing meals and prayers with her community. When Dr. Mitch Stevens came onto the show, he told her that he liked her better when she had her legs wrapped around him. This eventually led Terri to the revelation that she entered the nunnery as an escape after a previous relationship with Mitch that ended badly. She had seen him angry, and was afraid he'd hurt her like her abusive father did to her mother. When she understood why she became a nun, that it wasn't truly a calling, but really an escape, she left. Terri's order suggested she move out on her own for a while before she came to this realization, and during this time she was stalked by a former patient Neil Phillips (who had been diagnosed with Munchausen Syndrome) who stole several things from her apartment, broke in and decorated a Christmas tree, and sent her a beautiful dress for the hospital ball. This all culminated with him showing up to take her to the ball and becoming angry when she refused and tried to get him to leave. He tried to rape her and she stabbed him with a pair of scissors. Neal showed up to the ball by himself bleeding to death with two stab wounds in his abdomen, and later died during surgery. Terri reported the attack to the police, but she herself was then investigated as Neil's final words to a police officer were that his girlfriend Terri Sullivan had stabbed him. Some of Terri's personal belongings (that had been stolen) and a diary full of entries about their relationship was found in Neil's apartment. Terri was put on trial for Neil's murder, but she was acquitted. After Terri re-entered public life she warily began dating Malcolm Pussle, a surgical registrar, but always mourned the loss of her relationship with Mitch, who had by then married Rose and had a baby with her. When Rose (suffering bi-polar disorder) became a menacing threat in her life, she tried hard to be a supportive friend to Mitch. She remained beside Mitch during the divorce between him and Rose, eventually the two were free to be together. It was shortly after the divorce that Mitch Stevens proposed to Terri and they publicly displayed their relationship. In the short period of time between finalizing the divorce and the engagement, Terri discovered she was pregnant. It was also during this time that she tripped on a soapy floor that one of her staff hadn't finished cleaning, causing a miscarriage. Eventually the relationship between the two became slightly rocky, as Mitch became started drinking. He hit Terri during one of his drunken nights, but didn't seem to have a recollection of it. He had a CT scan and discovered he that a brain tumour which causing his irrational outbursts and memory problems (he started hallucinating Rose showing up at the hospital and yelling at a nurse he thought was her). Once the brain tumour was diagnosed, Terri arranged a secret wedding for her and Mitch with their close friends. She gave Mitch the gift of having a star named after him. Soon after they were married, Mitch underwent a very risky surgery to remove the brain tumour; it was initially successful, as he survived the surgery and woke up, but he died soon after in recovery from a bleed. Terri fell apart as a result of this and spent most of her nights outside in her neighbour's yard, looking at Mitch's star. She was brought into the hospital with a bad pneumonia after her neighbour phoned a co-worker to get her out of her yard. She managed to get herself together to return to work, was diagnosed with a benign heart tumor, and had surgery for it the day Ward 17 was permanently shut down. Terri and her staff were reassigned to the Emergency Department, under Dr. Frank Campion. One of Frank's first conversations with her was to tell her that he wasn't going to baby her staff like she did, and they weren't her staff anymore. While working as an RN in the ER, Terri had a fling with Dr. Jack Quade, but was always uncomfortable about their age difference. Her closest confidante and friend was Von. Terri eventually becomes guardian of Mitch's child Lucy. Lucy's mum, Rose is murdered shortly after Mitch's death, and her grandmother Victoria who was looking after her for a couple of years dies in surgery. Terri leaves All Saints to spend as much time as possible with Lucy, starting with a holiday to Mitch's homeland of Scotland.
Yvonne 'Von' Ryan	Judith McGrath	Enrolled Nurse, Registered Nurse, Patient Liaison Officer	February 1998 – October 2009	001–493
Von Ryan was an enrolled nurse while on Ward 17 and she later takes classes to become a registered nurse. She becomes an RN just as Ward 17 is closed and starts her working in the ED. Von is a fantastic nurse but can be unpredictable, moody and snappy. She has a strong and sharp personality, is quick to the point and does not take whingeing, back chat, or sloppy working. She is very good friends with Terri Sullivan, supporting her through all of her hard times, including Terri's court case for the murder of Neil Phillips, and Mitch's death. She can be very motherly to everybody else and has the potential to be one of the nicest people on earth, when she wants to be. Von served as a nurse in Vietnam and later worked in a children's hospital in London before moving back to Australia. Von's true love died serving in Vietnam. While sitting her RN exams, a woman is struck by a car when the students are coming in from a break, and Von stays to administer CPR. She doesn't pass her exam because she runs out of time. Von later meets the student who refused to stay and help her while she's working as an Agency Nurse. She tells Von that the woman is still in the ICU and isn't going to recover. After she is taken off of life support, Von is sued by the dead woman's daughter for medical negligence. She ends up having to sell her house and moves in with Nelson as a flatmate. Throughout the series Von finds out that she has a half-sister who has cancer. She is at first reluctant, but meets and cares for her half-sister, and later on becomes friends with her niece, Kerry. Later on Kerry becomes engaged to Nelson Curtis. On the day of their wedding, Von finds Kerry fatally stabbed in her room after coming back from an errand. She feels guilt over this as she thought Kerry was with Nelson in there, and if she'd known differently she could have intervened and potentially prevented that. After a negligence hearing before the board following a patient falling in the ED and sustaining a head injury, Von leaves to work in Admin for a while. She returns as a nurse in the ED after the current NUM, Deanna Richards, resigns. Von spoke with the new NUM, Gabriella about not being happy in her role as an ED nurse because there was no follow up with the patients after they were discharged. She took a role as the Patient Advocate Liaison Nurse for the ED, arranging follow-up care, counselling, and home care to ED patients who are discharged according to their needs. Von got her own office (much to Frank's annoyance, as he still had to share his) and was in charge of organizing the home care roster. Von took part in providing homecare visits such as wound care, and outpatient chemotherapy as well. Von provided end-of-life care to Ann Maree and helped Bart come to terms with her death. During one of Von's outpatient visits that a patient with the mental capacity of a 6-year-old (due to an accident as a child) locked her in his bathroom so she would stay and play word games with him. This triggered flashbacks to Von's time in Vietnam where she was locked in a supply building and raped by a soldier. Von had started having flashbacks to this when the ED was held hostage by gunmen. Von later encountered and confronted a soldier who had been in the building and watched what happened and asked him why he didn't do anything to help her. After someone asked her what she was talking with him about she just said that "he had something of mine and I got it back." The TV show ends when Von retires from All Saints.
Dr. Mitchell 'Mitch' Stevens	Erik Thomson	Medical Registrar	March 1999 – April 2003	045–221
Mitch was a fabulous doctor and brilliant diagnostician. He would fight for the lives of his patients almost to the point of obsession. He was obsessed with saving people because he never tried to save his sister, Lucy, when they were children when he found her lying on the ground, he thought she was just playing dead. Mitch was hopelessly in love with Terri, and always had been, fleeing to Africa when she initially went into the convent. After repeatedly asking Terri if there was any chance for them to get back together, Mitch began a relationship with Rose and they eventually had a daughter named Lucy. Before he married Rose, when asked in court, he admitted that he still was in love with Terri and would do anything to protect her. For many reasons Mitch and Rose's relationship didn't work. There was a lack of trust between them after Mitch discovered that Rose had bipolar disorder and didn't tell him, and was making decisions after her medical care while pregnant without telling him. Rose's bipolar disorder led her to obsess over him and Terri. In the time leading up to their divorce, Rose took Lucy and rarely let Mitch see her. She eventually got help in a mental hospital, and after she was discharged, Mitch and Rose agreed to divorce as they had both said and done things that had caused too much hurt. After the divorce, Terri and Mitch started a relationship. Terri briefly became pregnant, but suffered a miscarriage when she slipped on a soapy floor. Mitch and Terri did not have a lot of time together before Mitch was diagnosed with a brain tumour, which explained his changing behaviour (drinking a lot and one time hitting Terri). Shortly after this diagnosis, Terri arranged a secret wedding for her and Mitch with their closest friends. Mitch opted to have a risky surgery in an attempt to remove the tumour, and although he survived the initial procedure he died following complications. Before he died, Mitch told Terri that he never once stopped loving her, and Terri replied, saying that she never once stopped loving him.
Scott Zinenko	Conrad Coleby	Ambulance Officer	February 2001 – October 2004	127–286
Scott was an ambulance officer, Ben's partner. Scott began dating Rebecca Green but it ended in season 6, 2003 because she slept with his best mate Jared Levine. He gets a new ambulance partner Cate McMasters and is reluctant to become friends at first after what happened with Rebecca. He becomes close friends with Alex his new ambulance partner but Alex leaves after witnessing an incident and has to go into the Witness Protection Program. Always having problems with the rules, Scott leaves wanting to move onto something else in his life.
Paula Morgan	Jenni Baird	Registered Nurse	November 2001 – April 2004	166–266
Paula was a nurse in the Operating Room before getting a full time position on Ward 17. She is the single-mother of her son, Max. She briefly dates Ben Markham and gets pregnant however there were complications with the pregnancy and she had to have an abortion. She eventually started dating Dr. Luke Forlano and after a few false starts they get engaged and they move to New York together.
Nelson Curtis	Paul Tassone	Nurse Practitioner, Registered Nurse, Ward 17 2IC, E.D. N.U.M.	November 2001 – May 2006	168–349
Nelson Curtis joined the show in 2001. He was an excellent nurse, despite battling his alcoholism. He was married twice, first to an Indigenous Australian girl who he admitted he "was too drunk to help her" after a car crash. It is later revealed he has a daughter, Kahlia, from this relationship. His second marriage was to another alcoholic (Leanne) who eventually ends up in a relationship with Jared. Nelson occasionally slipped back into drinking alcohol again, but thanks to co-workers like Terri Sullivan and Von Ryan, he had support for it. Nelson also was kind enough to let Von stay at his house after Von had to sell her flat due to a court case in which she loses her life savings. Nelson and Von's niece, Kerry, met when Von offered her a place to stay after she left her cheating boyfriend, Colin. Nelson and Kerry fell in love and Nelson began tying up some loose ends in his life by finally obtaining a divorce from his second wife Leanne, and by arranging to see his daughter, who had been in the care of her mother's family since she was a baby. Nelson and Kerry considered moving to the Northern Territory to live near Nelson's daughter after she visited, but decided against it, as she was happy there and that was what was important to Nelson. Nelson and Kerry then were engaged and were to be married in the finale of season 8. Kerry was late to the wedding and Von found her fatally stabbed in her room. She died in the ER and a grieving and angry Nelson went to her ex's house and beat him into a coma. Nelson faced assault charges after this, but nothing came of it as Colin committed suicide while in Rehab after sending Nelson a note saying "Goodbye. I win." Nelson became an accredited nurse practitioner in season 9. Nelson has a difficult time coping with Kerry's murder and eventually shows up at Frank's house asking him to section him (get him admitted to a psych ward), so he can get well and be a dad to his daughter. Frank tells the ER staff that Nelson has resigned and is moving to the Northern Territory to be with his daughter.
Dr. Charlotte Beaumont	Tammy MacIntosh	Medical Fellow/ED 2IC	May 2002 –October 2009	184–493
Charlotte becomes the 2IC in the ED (after Zoe left for St. Angeles) after having recently completed her medical fellowship and works under its director, Dr. Frank Campion. Charlotte came from a family where expectations in regard to education were very low but, inspired to exceed this, she dreamed of becoming a doctor since she was a teenager. Charlotte made her way through medical school achieving good results. She is very compassionate and dedicated to her job, although she can become a little hot-headed when it comes to things she is passionate about. Charlotte was introduced into the show in its fifth season, taking emergency and night shifts. Her first major event was when she was treating a suspected Ebola outbreak with Dr. Mitch Stevens. Charlotte's sister, Sophia Beaumont, had a brief stint as a nurse in the ED with them clashing a little. Sophia clashed a lot with Frank and quit her job as an ED nurse. Charlotte is respected by her colleagues, particularly by Frank with whom she holds a very tight friendship. She was previously married to Dr. Vincent Hughes when she was younger; this ended when she revealed to him that she was gay, although they remain close friends. Subsequent episodes show her as bisexual, as she has a sexual relationship with Doug "Spence" Spencer. She told Rhiannon later that "she'd spent years convincing herself that she was gay [because she'd left Vincent for a woman], but realized it was the person you fall in love with, not the gender." She had several rescue dogs whom she loved, but one of them had to be put down after he bit a neighbour, and the others were murdered by Vincent's deranged stalker, Beth Chandler, in a later season. Charlotte had a few relationships with women, but when she decided she wanted to have a baby, it led her to end things with her current girlfriend, who didn't want children. This was around the same time Terri broke things off with Jack Quade, and the two of them spent a drunken night together which resulted in a pregnancy. Her dream of a baby was cut short when she was hit by a car outside of the hospital and miscarried. Charlotte meets Doug "Spence" Spencer, a pediatrician who does overseas work at a medical conference. He is an old friend of Vince as they served together in Timor. The begin a relationship and Charlotte becomes pregnant with his child. Charlotte had a little boy, Zack, whom she loves very dearly. She does well at juggling her hectic working life with her family life, her son spending a lot time in the hospital crèche. Zack was fathered by Spence, who was unhappy with working in Australia, and went back to work in Somalia. He asked Charlotte and Zack to come with him, but Charlotte decided to stay. In May 2008 it appeared that a relationship may be unfolding between Charlotte and nurse Rhiannon, but instead Rhiannon confided her sexuality to Charlotte and also made a pass at her. When Charlotte gently let her down, Rhiannon chose instead to make a sexual harassment complaint against Charlotte, even though she was the actual instigator. Charlotte tried unsuccessfully to deal with the situation via the internal mechanisms of the hospital, but eventually decided to sue Rhiannon for defamation, at which point Rhiannon backed down and admitted that she had lied about the sexual harassment. Charlotte then discovered Rhiannon in her bathroom, who had slashed her wrists in an attempt to take her life.
Dr. Vincent Hughes	Christopher Gabardi	Medical Registrar	April 2003 – July 2007	223–396
Vincent is a brilliant doctor who works in the ER. He was Mitch's student until he died. Vincent was married to Dr. Charlotte Beaumont when they were younger, but the couple divorced when Charlotte discovered she was gay. Vincent was a captain in the army and spent time in Timor. He was married after Charlotte but his second wife died in a landmine accident there. Vincent has a short-lived relationship with Grace Connolly, his medical student in the ER. He goes with her to a remote community that she's from to help her and her aging doctor father, but on the way back their plane crashes and Grace dies. After Grace dies, Vincent tries to cope by having a lot of one-night-stands. One of the women he hooks up with on New Year's Eve, Beth Chandler, becomes obsessed with him and starts stalking him. She eventually takes him to court, lying about him stalking her, but then drops the case in the middle of the hearing. After this, she ups her game, following Vincent around, and hurting those close to him. This culminates with her kidnapping and drugging Cate and luring Vincent to her house where she tries to get him to confess his love for her, threatening to kill Cate if he doesn't. They get into a physical altercation as Vincent tries to take a knife from her and she runs though some glass doors and purposefully stabs herself in the heart. Despite all this, Vincent tries to save her life, but she dies later in the ICU. Vincent then has a relationship with nurse Cate, but she dumps him after he ignores her and displays jealousy seeing Charlotte in a relationship with his old friend Spence. Vincent goes to Canada for several months on an exchange and is surprised to find that Charlotte is pregnant by Spence on his return. Vincent and Spence patch things up between each other and Vince is there to see Charlotte's baby. Soon after, he decides he needs to move on with his life; he gets a job in Canada at the hospital where he worked on the exchange program and moves there.
Sterling McCormack	Henry Nixon	Nurse Register	March 2003 – June 2004	222–272
Sterlo was a good nurse but, like other past nurses, he occasionally messed things up. He was the (third) CEO's nephew but kept that a secret. He and Terri never saw eye to eye, but they grew to accept each other. He coached a local football game for kids that Luke really wanted Max to join (but Max hated it). Most people thought he was clumsy, especially Von and Terri, but he made good friends with most everyone else. On his first day on ward 17, he was making coffee and broke Mitch's cup. In the season 6 finale, Sterlo was shot by crazed gunman Greg (an ex-employee of the hospital). He survived, but developed an addiction to morphine after his surgery, which eventually led to him stealing out of the S8 cupboard, both to use it and sell it. When he is brought in as an overdose and survives thanks to his friends, he decides to go to rehab.
Dr. Jack Quade	Wil Traval	Medical Registrar	March 2004 – November 2008	256–455
The ease with which Jack Quade's medical career is blossoming is a pleasant surprise to him. It has not always been easy. He comes from a working-class background, a tough mining and steel town where his father, Peter, still works as a fitter and turner. Jack's father brought him up on a diet of uncompromising honesty, swift kicks up the bum and terrible cooking. The youngest of three boys, Jack ended up doing a lot of the kitchen duties but somehow still manages to enjoy cooking. Peter (Jack's father) had an affair with Jack's mother. His mother dumped him at Peter's doorstep when he was 2. His mother ends up coming into the ER to find Jack, she is dying but wants to tell Jack that he has a sister called Rebecca. Both Jack's half-brothers, Dave and Neville, became policemen and their kid brother might well have followed them into the force if Neville hadn't almost been killed in a petrol station hold up. Jack opted for a less dangerous career and one which might serve his brothers well if they get into any more strife. At twenty-five, Jack is good looking and younger than his responsibilities would seem to dictate. Despite taking his work and patients very seriously, has a healthy disregard for authority and can sometimes seem to be lacking in propriety. He has a great sense of humour. He has a brief fling with Terri Sullivan, but she breaks things off due to their age difference. Jack spends a drunken night with Charlotte after this, and she becomes pregnant. When she finally tells him about the baby, he is excited to be a father, but things aren't meant to be as she is in an accident and miscarries. Jack moved in with Dan when Dan's cousin moved out. Jack was briefly involved with temporary ED NUM Deanna Richardson while he was doing his surgical rotation, but eventually saw through her lies (falsely accusing Frank of sexual harassment in an attempt to get him fired, and all the conniving and manipulation of the nursing staff she was doing to try and keep the NUM job permanently) and broke things off with her. In Season 10, Jack treats a man who he recognizes as someone who abused him as a child. Trying to forget about his past, he finds he needs to confront it after he meets a young man named Travis Knight, who was also abused by this man, and who is trying to find people to help him press charges. Jack initially brushes off this request and keeps trying to ignore what happened. After finding out Travis is dying (of Wilson's disease, not HIV as he suspected), he agrees to help they eventually go forward with the court case only to have it be delayed. The abuser is later brought into the hospital with fatal stab wounds and Trevor admits that he did it. Jack pays his bail and checks up on him while he is under house arrest. He is brought in unresponsive and dies. Jack gets his life back in order and moves into the spare room at Gabrielle's place after he starts feeling like a third wheel around Dan and Erica. He moves into Gabrielle's spare room and there is some jealously directed at him from Stephan. Near the end of season 11, Jack treats a patient with mercury poisoning, but because of a computer switch-over, he can't get the lab results to calculate the dosage of the chelation therapy. He blames himself after the patient dies, even though he is cleared of any wrong-doing by the Board. Jack sticks to working in triage after this until Frank forces him to treat a higher acuity patient. He jumps to a worst-case scenario of what's wrong, scaring the patient's wife into not wanting him to run anymore tests, but things get sorted out. Frank gives Jack some time off to think and he decides to resign and do some travelling and volunteer work. His farewell is cancelled as the ED receives news of Erica's death.
Dr. Frank Campion	John Howard	Director of Emergency	April 2004 – October 2009	265–493
Dr. Frank Campion is one of All Saints main characters in later seasons, and one of All Saints Hospital's top doctors. He is the head of the emergency department, is a fantastic doctor and has had extensive training in the field. He is demanding, pushes, and is sometimes abusive to his staff, but he always makes his patients his top priority. Frank is supportive of his staff, but generally in private. He rarely thanks his staff, including those he depends on the most for all their hard work even though he does appreciate it, which leads to some hard feelings and conflict. Frank became particularly attached to his intern, Bart West, who he agreed to mentor, after Bart was shot and Frank felt it was his fault. Frank has been married once, to Dr. Alison Newell, with whom he has a 15-year-old daughter, Kathleen, who is severely autistic. After Kathleen accidentally took an overdose of pills, Frank told Alison when she was in the ED, and Alison decided to become involved in Kathleen's life. Alison left when Kathleen was quite young; one of her reasons was she was having trouble bonding with her and it seemed to come easy to Frank. Frank later becomes engaged to Eve Ballantyne, whom he went to great lengths to win over. This engagement ended when Eve became pregnant and they discovered their baby had spina bifida. Eve decided to have the pregnancy terminated and Frank objected. She left town as Frank could not support her decision. Frank was a big support to Bart when his girlfriend Ann-Maree died from cancer. Frank briefly resigned as Director of the ED in season 11 after the ED was held hostage by gunmen who planned an elaborate heist to steal drugs from the pharmacy. After the crisis, Frank made a statement to the media blaming the situation and lack of security on the Administration. The current administrator, Oliver Maroney, in an effort to get rid of Frank started making things increasing difficult for the staff - refusing requests for equipment, having the NUM have to get approval from him to hire agency staff, and then making the current staff shadow the agency staff if hired. He also offered Zoe the job of Director of ED as soon as Frank was gone. Frank offered his resignation in order to have him lay off the staff who were very overworked by these new mandates. Zoe refused the promotion and discussed the situation with the ED staff who all agreed to quit if Frank was let go. Frank was offered his job back, no questions asked after this as having to deal with an entire department quitting trying to replace them was not something administration wanted to deal with. Several episodes later, after Charlotte got her fellowship, Frank was told he couldn't have two Fellows in the ED because the budget only allowed for one. Zoe applied for and got a job as the Director of ED at St. Angeles, and Charlotte became the new 2IC.
Jessica Singleton	Natalie Saleeba	Registered Nurse	April 2004 – April 2006	265–344
Jessica has worked in the Emergency Department ever since she became a Registered Nurse. She loves the variety, the pace and the challenge. She's a serious but happy young woman with a real vocation; a great nurse, practical and efficient, though sometimes these qualities win over compassion. She loves everything about the job and she even likes the boss. Jessica is still coming to terms with witnessing a shooting in the ED. She now panics whenever an aggressive patient or relative begins to act out - and this happens often in the ED. But Jessica refuses to quit and does not see herself as a fearful, panicky person. Jessica comes from a solid, happy, thoroughly middle-class family - her dad is a surveyor, her mum is a housewife, and brother Adrian is studying to become an architect. After a short stint overseas, they're all pleased to have Jessica living at home again and very proud of her. Jessica lacks is the same kind of absolute confidence in her own ability that her family has. Despite being petite and attractive, she still thinks of herself as the frumpy, plain teenager she once was. Though she'd never admit it, Jessica is a closet romantic, devouring Mills and Boon novels, going to the movies to watch classic romantic movies. Jessica dates ambo Stuart for a short time. Jessica leaves All Saints after Deanna Richardson becomes Acting NUM of the ED. She takes a job at St. Angela's as NUM of the ED.
Cate McMasters	Alexandra Davies	Registered Nurse, Ambulance Officer	May 2004 – May 2007, September 2007 – 2008, recurring	270–4##
Cate leaves the ED in the first episode of 2007 and decides to rejoin the ambulance service. She had a huge crush on Mac, her ambo partner who is engaged to someone else. He eventually admits he likes her too, but soon after this they are both in an accident where a ceiling collapses in a nightclub they're in on New Year's Eve. Mac went back in to look for Cate, but was injured by debris and suffers a spinal injury. Cate cares for Mac throughout his rehab after his fiancée walks away, but once he's on the road to recovery, his fiancée comes back and they decide to make a go of it. Cate discovered Vlasek's morphine addiction and reported him, forcing him to deal with it. Cate briefly dated Vincent after Beth Chandler kidnapped and almost killed her. She ended things with Vincent because he was jealous of his ex-wife's new romance with an old friend of his. After having a small breakdown (likely fueled by the friendship she has with her wild, flirty friend Jo Henderson) and ending up in the ED with a GHB overdose. She then had a relationship with 'Mike' Vlasek in 2007, but she ended it when she discovered that he told her he had a son (who was admitted as a patient) It wasn't that he had a son that bothered her, but that he walked out on him and his mother while she was still pregnant.
Dan Goldman	Mark Priestley	Registered Nurse	July 2004 – November 2008	278–455
Dan comes from an ordinary, lower-middle-class family with two sisters and a brother who is now in a wheelchair. Dan is a loyal friend who will drive those around him crazy one minute and be the biggest support the next. His decision to take up nursing was influenced by the side benefit that he'd be surrounding by plenty of young, single women. If his mates ever think he's less of a bloke for being a nurse, he's very quick to point this out and they soon see where he's coming from. Dan is first introduced when he's on his way to work an agency shift at All Saints. Traffic is stopped because of an accident and he gets out to help. Frank Campion is there already taking charge (because he was also caught in traffic). After seeing Dan work under pressure, Frank offers him a job in the ED. Dan is an easy-going young guy. He's insightful enough to know that he should be looking towards maturing and becoming more stable in his personal life, but he still enjoys partying, and being young too much to quite let it go. He enjoys watching cricket, going to the pub with his mates, seeing live bands and getting picked up by good-looking women. Dan contracts hepatitis C from a needle stick while caring for a patient in Season 10, episode 22. He eventually starts Interfuron treatment for it and is cured. Dan proposes to his friend and coworker Erica Templeton, and when they go visit his parents, it's clear that his mother does not like her. Erica is understanding of this, but hurt. Dan's father collapses from a heart attack while they are visiting, and while Erica takes charge during CPR while waiting on the ambulance, his mother insists that only family come to the hospital. A few days later Dan's father has another heart attack in hospital and dies. Erica doesn't go to the funeral, understanding that it will just upset Dan's mother more. Dan tells Erica later that he's invited his mother and brother to stay with him for a few weeks, because he doesn't think his mother can take care of his brother in this situation (Luke, his paraplegic brother, had recently broken his collarbone and needed extra help looking after himself. He was going to stay with his parents for a few weeks because he had been at Dan's for a while already). Dan and Erica sort things out with his mother, who isn't coping with her husband's death well, and then finish planning the wedding. The night before, Dan is staying in trying to get some rest, when his brother and some mates grab him from his bed and take him out for a buck's night. As a joke, they tied him to a tree and drove off, but got in a car accident. Dan got free and called an ambulance. Dan and Erica end up spending the night working in the ED, and the morning of the wedding Dan wants to call it off. A few words from Frank sets him right and they decide to go ahead with the wedding as planned. A few weeks after their honeymoon, Erica gets a letter that she's been accepted into a 6-week emergency nursing course at a university in Armidale. While she and Dan are not happy at being separated for 6 weeks, Dan encourages her to go and take the course, promising that he'll drive up in 3 weeks to visit. Erica never makes it to the university and Dan can't get a hold of her. After a day and a half, he reports her missing to the police. Dan and Bart even spend a night and a day driving the route she would have taken and stopping at every truck stop and diner they could find to ask about her, but they have no success. Three weeks later, the police turn up at All Saints to talk to Dan. He leaves with them, and later when he calls Frank he tells him that they found Erica's body in the bushland and are treating this as a murder. Dan goes back to his family's farm to be with his them indefinitely. Erica was originally going to be found alive, but after the actor playing Dan Mark Priestly died tragically in August 2008, the ending was re-shot. Jolene Anderson said she could no longer go on playing her character.
Dr. Sean Everleigh	Chris Vance	Medical Registrar	November 2005 – June 2007	334–393
Dr. Everleigh hails from the UK but moved to Australia as a teenager. He was originally a brain surgeon before transferring to the ED. His young niece is operated on and it is revealed that he operated on his young nephew several years before but he died in surgery. Sean dated Dr. Zoe Gallagher. He was hit by a car on a date with her and died later that night.
Erica Templeton	Jolene Anderson	Registered Nurse	April 2006 – September 2008	345–448
Erica is an ED nurse who is a kind, bright, and happy person. She is committed to her job and, although she has very limited experience, always looks for a challenge and does her best. She is a down-to-earth (if a little naive), loyal, and respectful person. She goes by the nickname Ricky. Erica has an older brother who she loves very much but who has a way of getting himself into trouble. He spent much of his life in gaol and in juvenile institutions. She'd do anything for him, even if she knew he would not repay her or even if he is lying; above all, she knows that he is good underneath. Erica's brother showed up in the ED after a stabbing in the prison where a guard was killed. He later escaped during a prisoner transfer and because he was injured, showed up at Dan's house and threatened to kill him if he didn't help him. Dan eventually convinced him to let him call and ambulance, but by the time he got to the ED it was too late and he died. Erica and Dan fall in love with each other, and although Dan foolishly breaks things off before he starts his Interferon treatment (that he doesn't tell her he's doing because of its unpleasant side effects). They patch things up and get engaged (August 2008) although Dan's mother is originally unhappy about the idea. Dan and Erica almost call off their wedding due to them both working an unexpected night shift right before it was supposed to take place, but decide to go through with it after a few choice words from Frank. Several weeks after their marriage, Erica gets a letter that she has been accepted into a 6-week emergency nursing course at a university in Armadile. Dan isn't happy about her having to be gone for 6 weeks, but encourages her to go because it's something she wanted to do. Erica never makes it to the university. She goes missing and three weeks later the police find her body in the bushland. They are treating this as a murder investigation; unfortunately, the murderer was never caught. The original plan was to have her found alive, but the end of this episode was re-written after the tragic death of Mark Priestley, so his character could be written off the show. Jolene Anderson said she could no longer play her character.
Dr. Bartholomew 'Bart' West	Andrew Supanz	Medical Intern, Medical Registrar	May 2006 – October 2009	349–493
Bart, 'Homer' to Frank, was the intern in the ED since 2006. Bart is a very switched on doctor and, according to Frank, "A Born Physician". Late in 2006, Bart was accidentally shot in the ED by an angry family member of a patient and his life became very hard. The angry patient had confronted Frank and meant to shoot him; which is why Frank felt it was his fault. He had Bart move in with him during his rehab. In 2007, at the end of his internship, Frank realised that he could not keep Bart on as a permanent staff member as the budget wouldn't allow it. Upon telling Bart the unfortunate news, Bart left the ED straight away to start his surgical rotation with Mike. It was then that Mike offered him a permanent position the Surgery Department which Bart accepted, knowing little about how much effort Frank was going to, to find a way that Bart could stay in the ED. After Steven Taylor was let go from the ED for alcoholism, Bart was offered his job and accepted it. In late 2007, Bart found his way into a relationship with one of his patients, Anne-Maree Preston, played by Yael Stone. She had cancer, and died not long after. This left Bart heart-broken, and he has not been in love since. In 2009, he slept with Frank's niece Amy, and broke the relationship later after that. In episode 13 of season 12, he and Amy become a couple.
Dr. Miklos 'Mike' Vlasek	John Waters	Director of Surgery/Director of Medical Response Unit	June 2006 – October 2009	350–493
Miklos Vlasek is an unlucky in love surgeon. It was revealed in late 2007 that he had abandoned his girlfriend (24 years ago) when she became pregnant. He donated his kidney to his long lost son when he turned up at the E.D. During this time, he was seeing ambo Cate McMasters, but she ended the relationship when she found out that he neglected to tell her about walking out on his pregnant girlfriend; leaving Mike single again. Mike has managed to maintain a 20-year relationship with his morphine addiction. In 2007, Cate discovered his nasty secret and after reporting it to Frank, he was forced to undergo detox or stop being a surgeon. During this time he had to routinely undergo drug checks and attend regular counselling sessions with Sonia Moore (played by Lucy Bell). He has since started up the All Saints Medical Response Unit and recruited Jo Mathieson (played by Mirrah Foulkes) and Steve Taylor (played by Jack Campbell) as part of the team.
Gabrielle Jaeger	Virginia Gay	Registered Nurse, E.D. N.U.M.	June 2006 – October 2009	353–493
Gabrielle, although still fairly young, has worked her way up through the ranks and has become the Nursing Unit Manager of All Saints' Emergency Department, after Deanna Richardson was forced to leave. Gabby is one of the most independent and gutsy members of the ED teams and is not pushed around by anyone, including Frank. She comes from the country and has a good sense of right and wrong, and is not afraid of anything. She operates by morals and is a very kind person. Gabby is a fantastic nurse and one who is there "when the chips are down". She would do anything for a patient or a colleague, but also knows when something is wrong, or when someone is taking advantage of her. She is not afraid of speaking her mind or disciplining her staff when needed. It was quite a shock for her it was Dr. Steve Taylor arrived at All Saints. They had grown up together in the country and had a previous relationship. It wasn't too long before the chemistry reappeared and Gabby and Steve were drawn together again. Gabby tries to help Steve with his alcohol problem. She eventually called Frank over to help him detox and Frank got him into an alcohol rehab program. Gabby and Steve are in a relationship of sorts. She is currently pregnant with Steve Taylor's baby.
Dr. Zoe Gallagher	Allison Cratchley	E.D. 2IC/ Medical Fellow	August 2006 – June 2008	359–436
Zoe Gallagher is the 2IC in the ED and works under its director, Dr. Frank Campion. She was previously an intern under Frank. She works in this position until Season 11, where she takes a job at St. Angeles. Zoe is an intelligent, independent and sophisticated woman; and she is highly ambitious. Zoe is straightforward and assertive in dealing with people. Zoe graduated medical school with top results and knew that she always wanted to work in the Emergency Department, where the action is. Upon her arrival, she was not warmly welcomed to the ED, especially as she ends up with the 2IC job; a job that Charlotte was thought she would have. Zoe is weary of relationships, fearing she'll make the mistakes that ended her previous marriage. This is made worse by the tragic loss of her boyfriend and fellow doctor, Sean Everleigh. Zoe and Charlotte have a contentious relationship in the ED, but can work well together.
Dr. Steven Taylor	Jack Campbell	Medical Registrar	August 2007 – October 2009	401–493
Steve is a country boy, from the same part of the world as Gabrielle. After graduating from University, he spent years working in rural areas across Australia as a locum. He never stayed at any hospital for too long, telling everyone that he was a "gypsy" by nature, desirous of changing scenery, new faces, and new experiences. We find out that his unsettled lifestyle has more to do with his love of alcohol then to his love of wandering. He is a strong and fit man who is comfortable in his own skin and can handle himself in any situation. He has a strong work ethic and a natural curiosity. A passionate, competitive, and brilliant doctor, Steve isn't one to run from a challenge, professionally or personally. Steve has a temper though and it doesn't take much to set it off. He burns his romantic bridges with Gabrielle, whom he loved dearly and will always have a soft spot for, but comes to the point where he has been able to forgive himself for the sins of his past and look to a more promising future. After Frank fires Steven for being drunk at work, he goes on a bender and then shows up at Gabrielle's. She calls Frank, as he's going through withdrawal and having DTs (delirium tremons) and Frank show us to treat him and gets him into an alcohol rehabilitation program. Challenge is what he craves most and the new Medical Response Unit feels like the right place to offer him those challenges. Steve is the father of Gabrielle's baby which he helps to raise.
Dr. Adam Rossi	Kip Gamblin	Medical Locum	October 2008 – October 2009	452–493
Adam is every patient's dream - a doctor who genuinely cares about them. Nothing is too much trouble, no ailment too insignificant - if it is affecting your quality of life in any way, then it needs Doctor Freeman's healing touch. This probably has a lot to do with his upbringing. Adam's earliest memories are of hiding with his brothers from an abusive father who liked to take out his frustrations on his wife and children. By the age of 14, Adam had had enough. After a particularly nasty night of violence in his home, he took to the streets. He did his best to nurse his injuries until he finally collapsed and was rushed to the local hospital. He was nursed in the Paediatric ward by Von Ryan, who saw something in him that other nurses didn't see: the bright spark that had almost, but not quite, been extinguished, his intelligence, and his good humour. Von saw the potential in a boy who was going to end up dead if someone didn't intervene, so she did. To this day, Adam views Von as the one and only person who actually cared about him. Through her faith in him and the work she did to get him into care and back to school, Adam thrived in both body and soul. On the day he graduated with a medical degree, there was only one person he invited to the ceremony - Von - and she attended with pride. Adam is a man of boundless energy and he'd argue that his inability to stop and take time out for himself is because that energy has to be channelled into something or he'll explode. He's a natural communicator and protector of women. Abuse of any description makes Adam lose all perspective. He can behave quite badly under these circumstances, becoming unpredictable and even dangerous at times. He hates himself when he loses his temper, because it reminds him a little too much of his father. He knows the statistics of the "abused becoming the abuser" and fights against it at every turn. Intimacy is difficult for Adam and long-term relationships scare the hell out of him. On top of this, Adam's compassion and eagerness to help often leads him into dangerous territory - not necessarily for those around him but for his own psychological well-being. His greatest asset is often his downfall - Adam cares too much. He's unable to create and maintain the professional barrier that so many Doctors use to keep their sanity intact. This often leads to dark, sleepless nights or a need to escape for a while and run off the feelings that threaten to overwhelm him. If he could step back occasionally and realise that "intention" and "result" don't always match, he'd be a much healthier soul.
Claire Anderson	Ella Scott Lynch	Registered Nurse	November 2008 – October 2009	453–493
Claire is a vibrant young woman, whose compassion for patients and competence as a nurse is immediately apparent to those around her. She is able to deal with the most confronting of situations with seeming ease and as a result, people tend to trust in her quickly and look to her for advice. However, it isn't quite as easy for Claire to trust others. Claire is calm, composed and rational in almost all arenas of her life but one thing she cannot cope with is aggression. She's had too much of that in her life. Her younger years were tainted with alcohol-fuelled rages from her father, and Claire made the mistake of falling in love with a man who had very similar tendencies. Any conflict in their relationship was solved with a fist, and Claire found herself making all the same excuses for black eyes and split lips that her mother used to make. After a particularly bad night, when her partner took out his frustrations over losing a job on her, Claire decided she'd had enough. Once he fell into a stupor, Claire packed the bare minimum of belongings and took off. She hasn't looked back, hasn't contacted him, and would be happy if she never laid eyes on him again. Determined to make a new start, Claire moved to NSW (New South Wales). She has not yet found her professional feet in a new health system and had been agency nursing for a few months now while she looking for the right permanent position in the right place, which ended up being in All Saints. Claire would love nothing more than to be in a healthy relationship with a new partner, but is glad she is now safe. She is alone, with no friends or no family nearby, but feel's that's a small price to pay. She's not a victim, she's a survivor, and nothing that has happened in her life has managed to undermine her innate sense of optimism and desire to connect with people.
Joanna 'Jo' Mathieson	Mirrah Foulkes	Specialist Rescue Paramedic	February 2009 – October 2009	457–493
Jo is in her mid 20s and is a "real action girl." Her father is the only one who calls her “Joanna.” She is a specialist Rescue Paramedic who is just as much at ease climbing down a cliff face as she is with the one-on-one medical scenarios her job exposes her to. Growing up in a large family, Jo learned at an early age to stand up or be overlooked. She's brilliant at what she does, fit and focused, with the ability to think outside the box. But these attributes are also her undoing as she tends to be impulsive and rebellious if a rule doesn't make sense to her. She gets a real buzz from the adrenaline rush of the rescues she participates in, but that's not to the exclusion of empathy or compassion. She knows when to be tough, when to hold a hand, and how command trust from a patient. A fiercely loyal friend and a team player, Jo has not made much room in her life for romance. She's had a few relationships but most have ended prematurely with the man in her life finding her strength and independence, often the things that attracted them to her in the first place, too hard to handle in the long run.
