= Ben Tari =

Australian actor

Ben Tari is a Hungarian born Australian actor most known for his work as Jared Levine on All Saints, an Australian hospital drama.

He is a graduate of the Australian National Institute of Dramatic Arts (NIDA). He joined all Saints from 1998 to 2003, (Season 1–6) and stayed for consecutive 235 episodes and guest starred in 2005 in episode 320, season 8. In 2008 he joined Home and Away playing an environmental officer for 15 episodes.

Tari has appeared on stage in productions such as Viewing Blue Poles at Belvoir Theatre in 2000, The Harp on the Willow at the Ensemble Theatre in 2003 and The Pessoptimist at the Sidetrack Theatre, Marrickville in 2005.
