= Paul Tassone =

Australian actor (born 1969)

- Born: 27 October 1969 (age 57); Perth, Western Australia
- Occupation: Actor
- Known for: All Saints; Underbelly; Home and Away

Paul Tassone (born 27 October 1969) is an Australian actor most known for his work as Nelson Curtis on All Saints, an Australian hospital drama. In late 2007–2008, he played a reverend who turned out to be a violent stalker as a result of a brain tumor on Home and Away. Tassone also starred as corrupt cop Dennis Kelly in the drama Underbelly: A Tale of Two Cities and reprised the role for the third season which is titled Underbelly: The Golden Mile. He has also had guest appearances on City Homicide and Rescue: Special Ops.

In 2020, Tassone provided the voice and motion capture for the video game Mafia: Definitive Edition.

In 2022, Tassone appeared in Russell Crowe thriller Poker Face.

On 8 December 2024, Tassone was announced in the cast for series 3 of Foxtel legal drama The Twelve.

== Filmography ==
=== Film ===
Year	Title	Role	Notes	Ref
2000	Twitch	Sam	Short film	
2005	Fingerprints	Cop	Short film	
2006	Darklovestory	Spruiker 2		
2008	Winners & Losers	William James McGavick	Short film	
2008	The Ground Beneath	Father	Short film	
2008	Men's Group	Moses	Feature film	
2011	Driver	Bruce	Short film	
2013	Saving Mr. Banks	Refreshment tent man	Feature film	
2014	Concealed	Richard		
2017	Those Left Behind	Jim (40)		
2022	Poker Face	Victor	Feature film	
2024	The Circus Monkey	Arthur	Short film	

=== Television ===
Year	Title	Role	Notes	Ref
1996	Sweat	Don Majors	TV series, 26 episodes	
1997	Bullpitt!	Marcel de Pasquale	1 episode	
1998	All Saints	Colin	TV series, 1 episode: "Truth or Dare"	
1998	Water Rats	Warwick Richard	TV series, 1 episode: "War Games"	
1999	Mumbo Jumbo	Murray	TV film	
1999	Silent Predators	Stranded motorist	TV film	
1999	First Daughter	Mark	TV film	
1999	All Saints	Jake Bosac	TV series, 1 episode: "Three's a Crowd"	
1999	Airtight	Murchie	TV film	
2000	All Saints	Race Caller	TV series, 1 episode: "Lottery of Life"	
2001	Love Is a Four Letter Word	Eddie Bird	TV series, 7 episodes	
2001–2006	All Saints	Nelson Curtis	Main cast (138 episodes); Recurring cast (38 episodes); Guest cast (1 episode)	
2007–2008	Home and Away	Reverend John Hall (recurring cast)	TV series, 15 episodes	
2009	Underbelly: A Tale of Two Cities	Det. Sgt. Dennis Kelly (recurring cast)	TV series, 11 episodes	
2009	City Homicide	Normal Duval	TV series, 1 episode: "Baker's Dozen"	
2009	Rescue: Special Ops	Glen Collins	TV series, 1 episode	
2010	Underbelly: The Golden Mile	Chief Insp. Dennis Kelly (main cast)	TV series	
2010	Packed to the Rafters	Lewis	TV series, 1 episode: "Lessons in Happiness"	
2011	Panic at Rock Island	Robert Abood	TV film	
2014	The Code	Andy King (main cast)	TV series	
2015	NCIS: Los Angeles	CIA Agent Walter	TV series, 1 episode: "In the Line of Duty"	
2018	The Good Place	Taxi Driver	T V series, 1 episode: "Jeremy Bearimy"	
2019	Squinters	Simon	TV series, 1 episode	
2020	From Now		Podcast series, 1 episode	
2025	Good Cop / Bad Cop	Bill Flanagan	TV series: 2 episodes	
2025	Scrublands: Silver	Amory Ashton	TV series: 1 episode	
2025	The Twelve	Blake Gibson	TV series: season 3	
TBA	Reckless	TBA	In Production	

=== Video games ===
Year	Title	Role	Notes
2020	Mafia: Definitive Edition	Vincenzo Ricci	Voice & motion capture
