= Wil Traval =

Australian actor (born 1980)

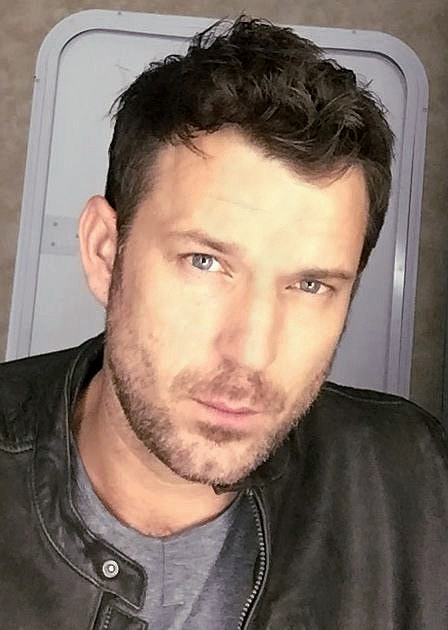
- Traval in August 2016
- Born: William Traval; 9 July 1980 (age 46); Victoria, Australia
- Occupation: Actor
- Years active: 2003–present
- Spouse: Terasa Livingstone (m. 2014)

William Traval is an Australian actor, known for his work as Dr. Jack Quade on the Australian hospital drama All Saints (2004–2008), and as Will Simpson on the Netflix superhero drama series Jessica Jones (2015–2018).

== Early life ==
Traval was born on a strawberry farm near Colac in Victoria, Australia, and is of part Russian descent. He graduated from high school at the age of 16. His passion for acting began in high school when he and his friends spent their time making short films. He cast himself in many roles including a werewolf and a psychopath. Traval studied Media and Literature at La Trobe University, but later he decided he would prefer to study at the National Institute of Dramatic Art (NIDA).

== Career ==
In 2003, Traval was cast in White Collar Blue. From 2004 to 2008, he was a main cast member of All Saints as Jack Quade. Traval was a main cast member on Jessica Jones in 2015 and recurring in 2018. He was a main cast member of Red Widow in 2013. Traval was a main cast member on Messiah in 2020. He has made guest appearances on Once Upon a Time, Arrow, Grimm, Chicago P.D., and Dynasty. In September 2026, it was announced Traval had joined the cast of General Hospital in the role of Jude — later revealed to be Jude Jacks. He made his first appearance on 16 October of the same year.

== Personal life ==
Traval married Terasa Livingstone in 2014.

== Filmography ==
=== Film ===
Year	Title	Role	Notes
2006	The Last Days of Connie Hays	Val	Short film
2010	Primal	Dace	
2013	Five Thirteen	Richard	
2018	Antidote	James	

=== Television ===
Year	Title	Role	Notes
2003	White Collar Blue	Uniformed cop / Constable Tom Saunders	3 episodes
2004–08	All Saints	Jack Quade	Main cast (seasons 7–11)
2004	McLeod's Daughters	Dylan Abbott	Episode: "Fool for Love"
2004	Jessica	Billy Simple	Miniseries
2009–11	Rescue: Special Ops	Hamish McIntyre	8 episodes
2010	Underbelly: The Golden Mile	Joe Dooley	Main cast; 13 episodes
2011	Leverage	Craig Mattingly	Episode: "The Girls' Night Out Job"
2012	The Glades	Neil Gannon	Episode: "Islandia"
2012	Dexter	Tony Rush	Episode: "Sunshine and Frosty Swirl"
2012	The Inbetweeners	Johnno	2 episodes
2013	Red Widow	Irwin Petrov	8 episodes
2013–15, 2017	Once Upon a Time	Keith / Sheriff of Nottingham	5 episodes
2013	Rizzoli & Isles	Jim Blackman	Episode: "Somebody's Watching Me"
2015	CSI: Crime Scene Investigation	Carlo Derosa	Episode: "The Last Ride"
2015–18	Jessica Jones	Will Simpson	Main cast (season 1); Guest cast (season 2); 10 episodes
2016–18	Arrow	Christopher Chance / Human Target	2 episodes
2017	Grimm	Zerstörer	Season 6, 2 Episodes
2017	Chicago P.D.	Sean McGrady	Episode: "Fallen"
2018	Deadly Matrimony	Kyle Gardner	Made-for-TV movie directed by Jake Helgren
2020–21	Dynasty	Father Caleb Collins	8 episodes
2020	Messiah	Will Matthews	Main cast
2026	General Hospital	Jude Jacks	Series regular
