= Alexandra Davies =

Australian actress (born 1977)

- Born: 8 March 1977 (age 49); Newcastle upon Tyne, United Kingdom
- Years active: 1989–present
- Spouse: Justin Hanrahan (m.2008, div.2017)
- Children: 1

Alexandra Davies (born 8 March 1977) is an English-born Australian actress. She is known for her roles in Young Lions, as Det. Sr. Const. Donna Parry, and All Saints, as Cate McMasters.

== Biography ==
She attended Castle Hill High school from 1989 to 1994

Davies graduated from the University of Western Sydney with a Bachelor of Arts in Performance

In her breakthrough role, Davies played Donna Parry in the Australian police drama Young Lions in 2002. She was a Most Popular New Female Talent nominee at the 2003 Logie Awards.

Davies also starred in the sitcom Flat Chat and has made guest appearances on Water Rats, McLeod's Daughters and The Secret Life of Us.

In 2005 she also had a very brief role in the film Stealth.

Since 2004 Davies has portrayed character Cate McMasters in the medical drama All Saints. She previously appeared in two early episodes of the show as a woman with whom previous character Ben Markham had a fling.

== Personal life ==
Davies married to Justin "Jay" Hanrahan, a cameraman she met while on All Saints, in January 2008. The couple give a birth to a son. In 2016 they separated and filed divorce on 20 March 2017 by the Los Angeles County Superior Court.

== Filmography ==
Film
| Year | Title | Role | Notes |
|---|---|---|---|
| 2021 | The Dunes | Mrs Night | |
| 2019 | Gates of Darkness | Emily | |
| 2019 | The Way We Weren't | Judy | |
| 2017 | Weddings Inc | Pamela | Short |
| 2016 | Seattle Road | Gwen | |
| 2016 | Platonic | Mysterious Woman | Short |
| 2015 | Distance to Now | Lacey | Short |
| 2015 | Run | Allison Saunders | Short |
| 2014 | Past Imperfect | Helena | Short |
| 2010 | Artic Blast | Emma Tate | |
| 2009 | Fragment | Claire | |
| 2009 | X-Men Origins: Wolverine | Woman of the Night | |
| 2006 | Reasons Beyond Me | Ali | Short |
| 2005 | Stealth (film) | Ben's Date | |
| 2000 | After the Rain | Sally | |

Television
| Year | Title | Role | Notes |
|---|---|---|---|
| 1993 | Home and Away | Danielle | Season 6, Episode 25 (#1170) |
| 1995 | Echo Point | Anna | Season 1, Episode 67 |
| 1999 | All Saints | Naomi Collins | Season 2, Episode 29 / Season 3, Episode 20 |
| 1999 | Home and Away | Gillian 'Amber' Williams | Season 12, Episode 175 (#2700) |
| 2000–2001 | Beastmaster | Zuraya | Season 1, Episode 12 / Season 3, Episode 7 |
| 2000 | Water Rats | Elyse Pritchard | Season 5, Episode 5 & 6 |
| 2001 | Flat Chat | Julie Coyne | Season 1 (main role, 13 episodes) |
| 2002 | Head Start | Ali | Season 1, Episodes 38, 39 & 40 |
| 2002 | McLeod's Daughters | Briony Masters | Season 1, Episode 21 / Season 2, Episodes 9 & 10 |
| 2002 | Young Lions | Det. Sr. Const. Donna Parry | Season 1 (main role, 22 episodes) |
| 2003 | The Secret Life of Us | Marnie | Season 3, Episode 7 |
| 2008 | All Saints | Cate McMasters | Seasons 7–10 (main role, 133 episodes) / Season 11, Episodes 1 & 7 (guest role) |
| 2009 | McLeod's Daughters | Monique Black | Season 8, Episodes 21 & 22 |
| 2009 | The Cut | Brandi Holland | Season 1, Episode 5 |
| 2013 | Reef Doctors | Gillian | Season 1, Episode 10 |
| 2023 | The Artful Dodger | Miss Tinkler | Season 1, Episode 1 |

Video games
| Year | Title | Role | Notes |
|---|---|---|---|
| 2016 | Uncharted 4: A Thief's End | Additional voices | Video Game |
