= Mark Priestley =

Australian actor and comedian (1976–2008)

- Born: 9 August 1976; Perth, Western Australia, Australia
- Died: 27 August 2008 (aged 32); Sydney, New South Wales, Australia
- Education: National Institute of Dramatic Art
- Alma mater: Aquinas College, Perth
- Occupation: Actor comedian

Mark Damien Priestley (9 August 1976 – 27 August 2008) was an Australian actor and comedian. Born in Perth, Western Australia, he graduated from the National Institute of Dramatic Art (NIDA) with a degree in Performing Arts (acting) in 1999. His first big TV break was when he appeared in The Farm in 2000 and met director Kate Woods. She gave him a role in her mini-series Changi in 2001.

== Career ==
Priestley played a semi-regular role in The Secret Life of Us, had roles in two ABC mini-series-Changi and The Farm and appeared in Blue Heelers before his first on-air appearance in All Saints in July 2004. Priestley was a long-time friend of Wil Traval, his co-star on All Saints. The two were known to get up to countless pranks on set.

Priestley also had some notable theatre credits. He worked with the Bell Shakespeare Company, playing Silvio in The Servant of Two Masters, as well as with The Sydney Theatre Company in Major Barbara, both in 2003.

== All Saints ==
Priestley's character on the Australian television program All Saints (Dan Goldman) was involved with a storyline with his on-screen wife Erica when the actor took his own life. Coincidentally, the final two episodes Priestley was to play in on the program (written before his death) also involved much tragedy and sadness.

== Personal life ==
Priestley was the partner of actress and writer Kate Mulvany.

=== Death ===
On the afternoon of 27 August 2008 Priestley checked into the Swissotel in Market Street, Sydney, under the name 'Damien Barker'. He jumped from a window at the hotel at about 2PM. Police confirmed that his body was found in an awning. A police spokesperson said that the incident was not being treated as suspicious. The actor was believed to have been suffering from depression. Priestley continued to be seen posthumously in his All Saints role until 18 November 2008.

Priestley's funeral was held on 4 September 2008 at Perth's Holy Family Catholic Church in Como, with more than 500 people in attendance. Press and camera crews were allowed to enter the church at the permission of the family, under the condition that no details of the eulogy be released in public. Priestley was privately cremated after the ceremony.

Priestley was rewarded for his acclaimed work on All Saints in April 2009, nominated for a posthumous Logie Award for Most Popular Male Actor on Television but lost out to Home and Away actor Todd Lasance. It is also noted at the end of the Channel Seven Perth Telethon 2008 telecast as being in memory of him.

== Notable roles ==
- All Saints (2004–2008) – Nurse Dan Goldman
- The Secret Life of Us (2005) – Marcus Nelson
- Loot (2004) – McLachlan Jutsum
- Blurred (2002) – Calvin Jutsum the Holden Boy
- Changi (2001) – John 'Curley' Foster
- The Farm (2001) – Johnno McCormick
- Better Than Sex (2000) – Guy A
- Warlords Battlecry (2000) (voice in videogame)
- Water Rats (2000) – Luke Harris
- Marriage Acts (2000) – Dan Hawkins
