= Babes in the Wood (disambiguation) =

Babes in the Wood is a traditional children's tale.

Babes in the Wood may also refer to:

== Film and television ==
- Babes in the Woods, a 1932 animated short film in the Silly Symphony series
- Babes in the Wood (TV series), a British sitcom from 1998 to 1999

=== Television episodes ===
- "Babe in the Woods", Mannix season 5, episode 16 (1972)
- "Babes in the Wood", Over the Garden Wall episode 8 (2014)
- "Babes in the Wood", SuperMansion season 1, episode 10 (2015)
- "Babes in the Woods", 227 season 4, episode 14 (1989)
- "Babes in the Woods", All Saints season 1, episode 17 (1998)
- "Babes in the Woods", The Hogan Family season 2, episode 21 (1987)
- "Babes in the Woods", Lassie season 12, episode 26 (1966)
- "Babes in the Woods", Life Goes On season 4, episode 7 (1992)
- "Babes in the Woods", My Sister Sam season 1, episode 9 (1986)
- "Babes in the Woods", Primeval: New World episode 7 (2012)
- "Babes in the Woods", The Reppies season 1, episode 1 (1996)
- "Babes in the Woods", The Simple Life season 5, episode 8 (2007)

== Literature ==
- Babes in the Wood, a 1910 novel by Bithia Mary Croker
- Babes in the Wood, a 1929 novel by Michael Arlen
- Babes in the Wood, a 2020 non-fiction book by Graham Bartlett and Peter James
- Babes in the Woods, a 1960 novel by Lawrence Block, ghostwritten as William Ard
- Babes in the Woods, a 1965 novel by Lillian O'Donnell
- Babes in the Woods, a 1997 novel by Chris Lynch
- Babes in the Woods, a 2003 novel by Carolyn Haines, writing as Caroline Burnes
- The Babe in the Wood, a 1976 novel by Roger Longrigg
- The Babes in the Wood, an 1875 novel by James De Mille
- The Babes in the Wood, an 1879 picture book by Randolph Caldecott
- "The Babes in the Wood", an 1896 short story by E. Nesbit
- The Babes in the Wood, a 2002 novel by Ruth Rendell

== Music ==
- Babes in the Wood, a 1991 album by Mary Black

== Plays ==
- The Babes in the Wood! and the Good Little Fairy Birds!, an 1859 play by Henry James Byron
- The Babes in the Wood, an 1870 play by Tom Taylor (dramatist)
- The Babes in the Wood, a 1935 play by V.C. Clinton-Baddeley
- Babes in the Wood, a 1938 play by James Bridie

== See also ==
- Babes in the Wood murders (disambiguation), various events so-called for their resemblances to the traditional tale
- Boobs in the Woods (1925 film), a short silent film by Mack Sennett starring Harry Langdon
- Boobs in the Woods, a 1940 short film starring Andy Clyde
- Boobs in the Woods, a 1950 cartoon in the Looney Tunes series
- "Boobs in the Woods", a Hokey Wolf cartoon in The Huckleberry Hound Show
- Babes in the Darkling Wood, a 1940 novel by H. G. Wells
- Dead Babes in the Wood, a. k. a. Enrollment Cancelled, a 1952 novel by Dolores Hitchens, writing as D. B. Olsen
- Old Babes in the Wood, a 2023 short story collection by Margaret Atwood
