= Essex murders =

The Essex murders may refer to several murders in the county of Essex, England:

- Babes in the Wood murders (Epping Forest), 1970 murder of two children
- White House Farm murders, 1985 murder of Bamber family members
- Rettendon murders, 1995 murder of three drug dealers in a Range Rover
- 2014 Colchester murders, by 15-year-old James Fairweather
