= Babes in the Wood =

Traditional children's tale

Colour plates from Randolph Caldecott's book of the rhyme

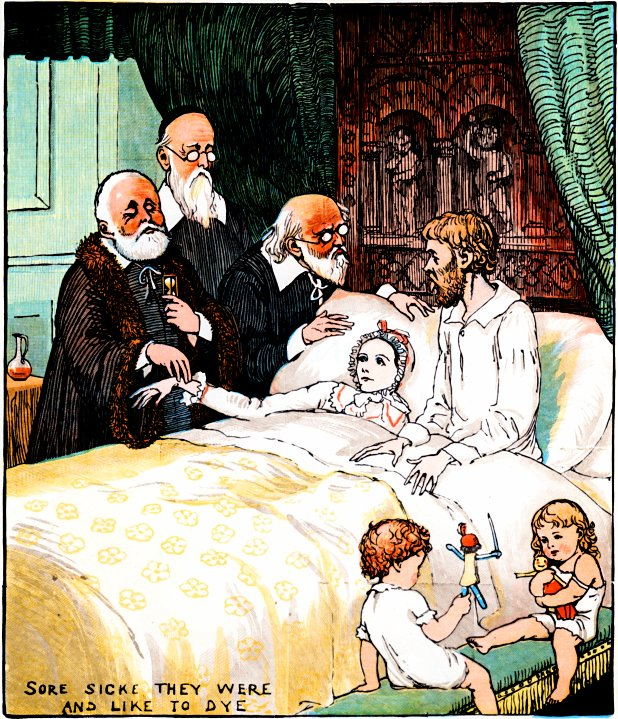
The parents: so sick they were and like to die

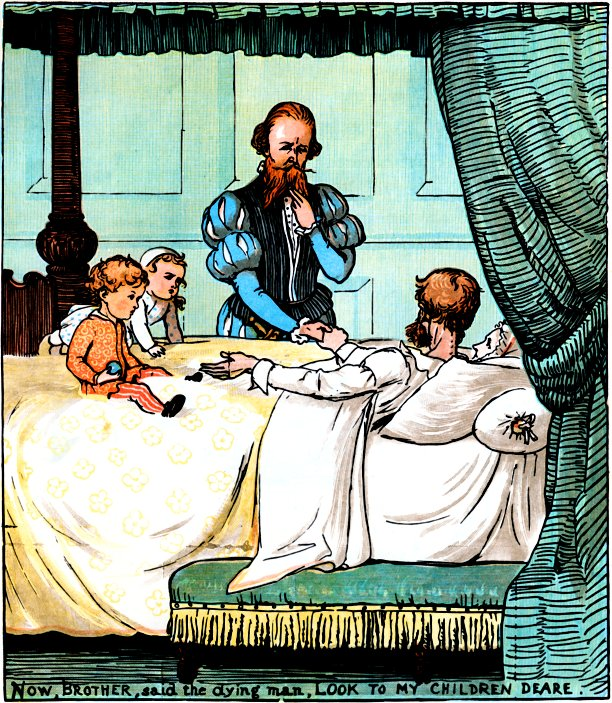
"Now, brother", said the dying man, "look to my children dear"

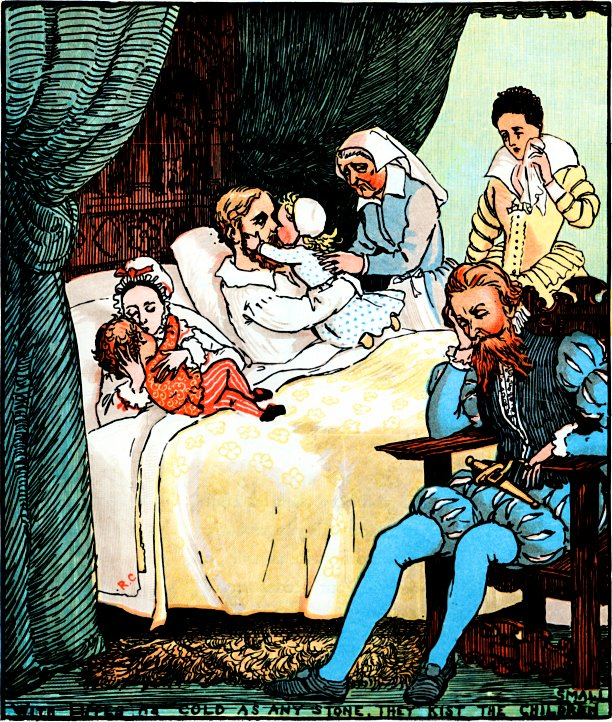
With lips as cold as any stone, they kiss the children small

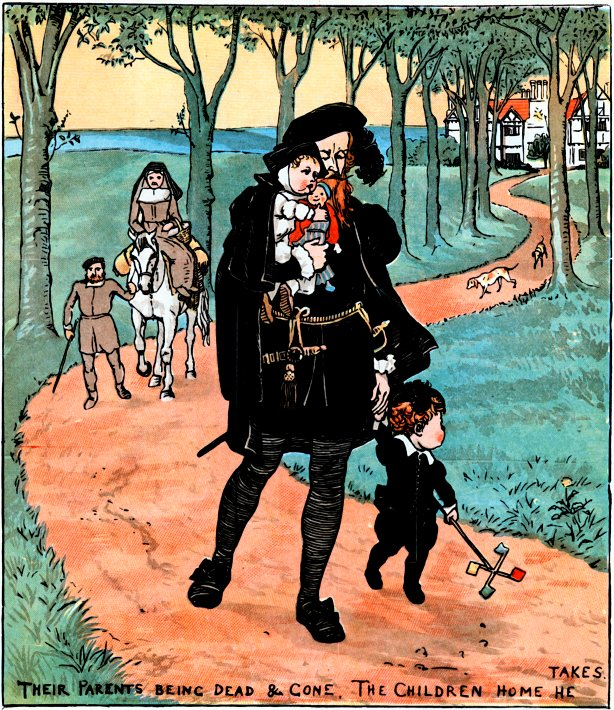
The parents being dead and gone, the children home he takes

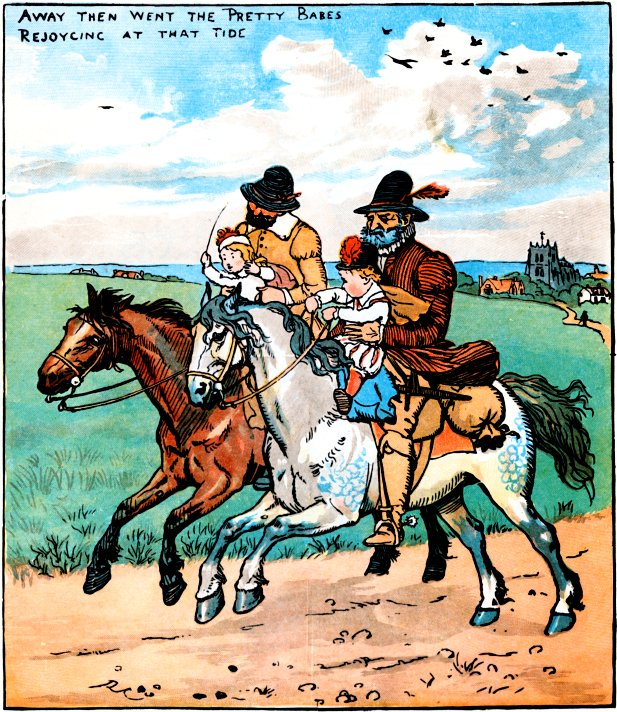
Away then went those pretty babes, rejoicing at that tide

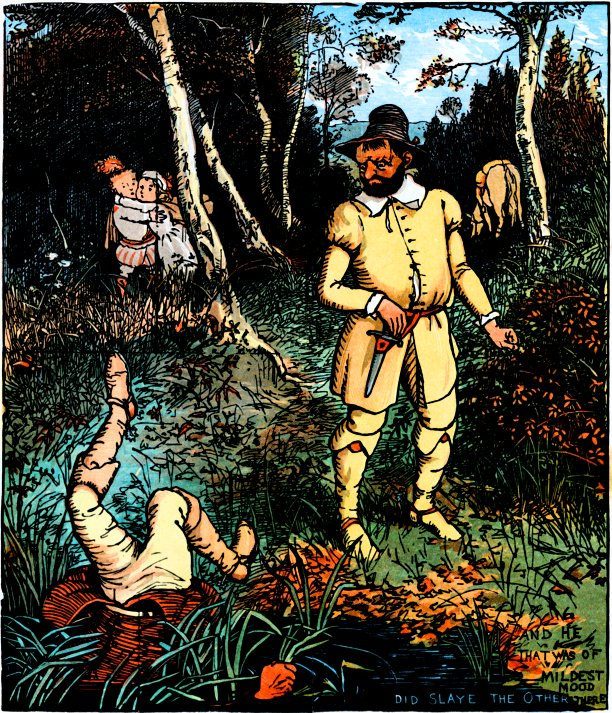
And he that was of mildest mood, did slaye the other there

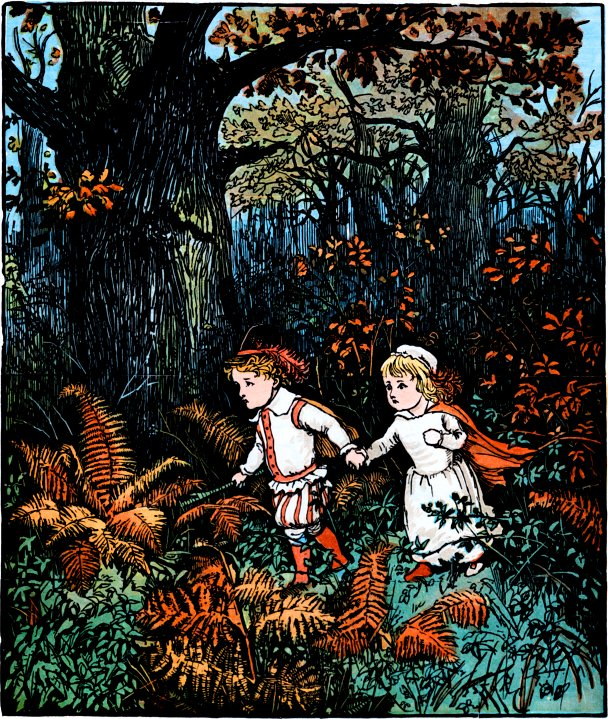
These pretty babes, with hand in hand, went wandering up and down

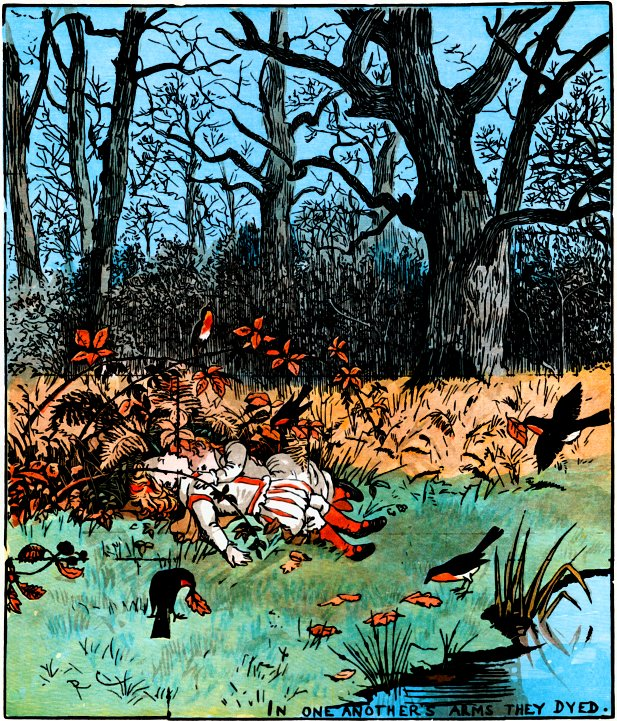
In one another's arms they died

Babes in the Wood is a traditional English children's tale, as well as a popular pantomime subject. It has also been the name of some other unrelated works. The expression has passed into common language, referring to inexperienced innocents entering unawares into any potentially dangerous or hostile situation.

== Traditional tale ==
The traditional children's tale is of two children abandoned in a wood, who die and are covered with leaves by robins.

It was first published as an anonymous broadside ballad by Thomas Millington in Norwich in 1595 with the title "The Norfolk gent his will and Testament and howe he Commytted the keepinge of his Children to his own brother whoe delte most wickedly with them and howe God plagued him for it".

The tale has been reworked in many forms; it frequently appears attributed as a Mother Goose rhyme. Around 1840, Richard Barham included a spoof of the story in his Ingoldsby Legends, under the title of The Babes in the Wood; or, the Norfolk Tragedy. Harris cheekily claims in an endnote that the true history of the children is, 'or ought to be,' in "Bloomfield's [sic] History of Norfolk", but that work's Wayland section does not mention it. The anonymous ballad was also illustrated by Randolph Caldecott in a book published in London in 1879.

The story tells of two small children left in the care of an uncle and aunt after their parents' deaths. The uncle gives the children to ruffians to be killed, in order to acquire their inheritance, telling his wife they are being sent to London for their upbringing. The murderers fall out, and the milder of the two kills the other. He tells the children he will return with provisions, but they do not see him again. The children wander alone in the woods until they die; their bodies are covered with leaves by the birds. Like many morality tales, the story continues with a description of the retribution befalling the uncle. In sanitized versions, the children are bodily taken to Heaven. The story ends with a warning to those who have to take care of orphans and others' children not to inflict God's wrath upon themselves. The story is also used as a basis for pantomimes. However, for various reasons including both the brevity of the original and the target pantomime audience of young children, modern pantomimes by this name usually combine this tale with parts of the modern Robin Hood story (employing the supporting characters from it, such as Maid Marian, rather than Robin himself) to lengthen it.

== Adaptations ==
=== Live-action short ===
Fox Film produced a 36-minute short of the story, The Babes in the Woods, adapted by screenwriter Bernard McConville in 1917. Fox's treatment included a wicked witch and a house of candy, elements borrowed from the "Hansel and Gretel" folk story. This film provides a happy ending for the children, with Robin Hood and his company rescuing them in the end.

=== Animated short ===
Walt Disney re-worked this tale for his 1932 short animated film Babes in the Woods, incorporating some material from "Hansel and Gretel" by the Brothers Grimm, and adding a village of friendly elves (a feature not traditionally present in either tale) and a happy ending.

=== TV pantomime ===
On Christmas Eve 1973, Junior Showtime did a Babes in the Wood pantomime episode at the Bradford Alhambra theatre. It starred Bobby Bennett as Robin Hood, Peter Goodwright as Alan A'Dale, Susan Maughan as Maid Marian, Roy Rolland as Nanny Riley, John Gower as the Sheriff of Nottingham, Eddie Large as Private Large, Syd Little as Private Little, Colin Prince as Little John, Norman Collier as Will Scarlett, Bonnie Langford as Babe Tilly, and Mark Curry as Babe Willy.

== Folklore ==
Folklore has it that the events told in Babes in the Wood originally happened in Wayland Wood in Norfolk, England. It is said that the uncle lived at the nearby Griston Hall. The ghosts of the murdered children are said to haunt Wayland Wood. The village signs at Griston and nearby Watton depict the story. In the folklore version, the uncle resents the task and pays two men to take the children into the woods and kill them. Finding themselves unable to go through with the act, the criminals abandon the children in the wood where, unable to fend for themselves, they eventually die.

Another version, from Lancashire, has it that the tale is based on real events of 1374, when "the villainous Robert de Holland" illegally seized the land of 13 year-old Roger de Langley and his young bride. The children flee to the nearby woods and are cared for by loyal retainers until they are rescued by their legal guardian John of Gaunt.

== Other cultural references ==
=== Music ===
The 1915 Broadway musical Very Good Eddie featured a song entitled Babes in the Wood by composer Jerome Kern and lyricist Schuyler Greene. Main character Eddie Kettle comforts former love Elsie Darling in a duet in which each refers to the traditional tale. A recording of this song was included in the 1993 CD Jerome Kern Treasury, sung by Hugh Panaro (Eddie) and Rebecca Luker (Elsie), and conducted by John McGlinn (Angel CDC 7 54883 2).

Eddie: Then put on your little hood,
And we'll both be, Oh, so good!
Like the babes in the wood.

Elsie: When the babes were lost in the gloomy wood,
It's no wonder they were so very good.
Fourteen angels were watching them,
So all the story books state,
Sandman's coming now, it is getting late.

Cole Porter's song Babes in the Wood, from his 1928 musical Paris, is a modern and sardonic rewriting of the story:

They were lying there in the freezing air
When fortunately there appeared
A rich old man in a big sedan
And a very, very fancy beard
He saw those girls and cheered
Then he drove them down to New York Town
Where he covered them with useful things
Such as bonds and stocks, and Paris frocks

Traditional English singers Bob and Ron Copper sang Babes in the Wood and their version was released on the EFDSS LP Traditional Songs from Rottingdean. According to Steve Roud, the Coppers' abridged version of the story and the song's tune came from musician and composer William Gardiner.

=== Murders ===
Several murders of children in English-speaking countries have been nicknamed the "Babes in the Wood murders":

- Babes in the Wood murders (Pine Grove Furnace), 1934; between Maryland and Pennsylvania, USA
- Babes in the Wood murders (Stanley Park), c. 1947; Vancouver, Canada
- Babes in the Wood murders (Epping Forest), 1970; Essex, England
- Babes in the Wood murders (Brighton), 1986; Sussex, England
