= Babes in the Wood murders =

The Babes in the Wood murders may refer to any of the following child murder cases:

- Babes in the Wood murders (Pine Grove Furnace), 1934; between Maryland and Pennsylvania, USA
- Babes in the Wood murders (Stanley Park), c. 1947; Vancouver, Canada
- Babes in the Wood murders (Epping Forest), 1970; Essex, England
- Babes in the Wood murders (Brighton), 1986; Sussex, England

== See also ==
- Babes in the Wood, also known as Children of the Wood, a traditional children's tale.
- Babes in the Wood (disambiguation)
