= All Saints season 2 =

All Saints
- Season 2
- No. of episodes: 43

Release
- Original network: Seven Network
- Original release: 9 February – 23 November 1999

Season chronology
- ← Previous; Season 1 Next → Season 3

The second season of the long-running Australian medical drama All Saints began airing on 9 February 1999 and concluded on 23 November 1999 with a total of 43 episodes.

== Plot ==
From car accidents to mental health, the doctors of All Saints continue to tirelessly tend to the patients.

== Cast ==
=== Main ===
- Georgie Parker as Terri Sullivan
- Jeremy Cumpston as Connor Costello
- Judith McGrath as Von Ryan
- Libby Tanner as Bronwyn Craig
- Ben Tari as Jared Levine
- Kirrily White as Stephanie Markham
- Martin Lynes as Luke Forlano (41 episodes)
- Erik Thomson as Mitch Stevens (episodes 4–43)
- Sam Healy as Jaz Hillerman (10 episodes, up to episode 11)
- Andrew McKaige as Peter Morrison (9 episodes, up to episode 12)

=== Recurring ===
- Brian Vriends as Ben Markham (39 episodes)
- Justine Clarke as Samantha O'Hara (13 episodes)
- Jake Blundell as Tony Hurst (13 episodes)
- Celia Ireland as Regina Butcher (12 episodes)
- Joy Smithers as Rose Carlton (4 episodes)
- Ling-Hsueh Tang as Kylie Preece (4 episodes)
- Elizabeth Maywald as Sophie Williams (2 episodes)

=== Guest ===
- Kim Hilas as Joan Marden (6 episodes)
- Peter Lamb as Neil Phillips (7 episodes)
- James Roden as Dr. Stan Ridgeway (5 episodes)
- Alexandra Fowler as Juliette McAllister (3 episodes)
- Terry Serio as Greg Costello (3 episodes)
- Pippa Grandison as Simone Carlisle (3 episodes)
- Melissa Jaffer as Eileen Sullivan (3 episodes)
- Martin Vaughan as Ryan Sullivan (2 episodes)
- Henri Szeps as George Bresnic (2 episodes)
- Bill Hunter as Ron Williams (2 episodes)
- Kristian Schmid as Thomas Ferry (2 episodes)
- Myles Pollard as Robert Ford (2 episodes)
- Grant Bowler as Darren Rigg (2 episodes)
- Kath Gordon as Astrid Langley (1 episode)
- Andy Anderson as Alan Mitchell (1 episode)
- Monroe Reimers as Ashok Patel (1 episode)
- Rhondda Findleton as Sharon Ellison (1 episode)
- Lois Ramsey as Thelma Franklin (1 episode)
- Andrea Moor as Alana Devlin (1 episode)
- Betty Bobbitt as Olivia Macreadie (1 episode)
- Gosia Dobrowlska as Lillian Gehler (1 episode)
- Tina Bursill as Margaret Evans (1 episode)
- Aaron Blabey as Scott Lacey (1 episode)
- Rebecca Smart as Charlie Wilde (1 episode)
- Carole Skinner as Sandra Gillespie (1 episode)
- Eric Bana as Rob Biletsky (1 episode)
- Stephen O'Connor as Julian Ridgeway (1 episode)

== Episodes ==
No. overall	No. in season	Title	Directed by	Written by	Original release date
42	1	"Truth & Consequence – Part 1"	Grant Brown	Louise Crane-Bowes	9 February 1999
Terri and Peter help Sophie fight for custody of her children. Bronwyn becomes emotionally involved in the fate of a car accident victim and his young daughter.
43	2	"Truth & Consequence – Part 2"	Robert Klenner	Louise Crane-Bowes	9 February 1999
Terri, Peter and Ron find themselves in a siege situation when Sophie cracks. Bronwyn's fundraising netball game disintegrates. Von's New Year's resolution seems destined to go up in smoke.
44	3	"Aftershocks"	Peter Fisk	Sally Webb	16 February 1999
Terri struggles to deal with what has happened to her friends. Bronwyn learns about the hierarchy in the ambulance organisation.
45	4	"The Longest Day"	Scott Feeney	Christina Milligan	23 February 1999
A busy day on the ward turns to chaos when the Health Minister is brought in as a patient. A lack of beds means a patient is left to recover from her operation on a trolley in the corridor.
46	5	"If These Walls Could Talk"	Grant Brown	Cathy Strickland & Andy Ryan	2 March 1999
Terri's emotional equilibrium is tipped when an old flame and colleague, Dr. Mitch Stevens, returns to All Saints after a ten year absence.
47	6	"Getting to Know You"	Robert Klenner	Anthony Ellis-Morris	9 March 1999
Mitch Stevens's unorthodox doctoring style brings tension – and humor – to Terri's ward. Ben's first day back brings unanticipated challenges for Bronwyn.
48	7	"Dependence Day"	Peter Fisk	Andy Ryan & Shane Porteous	16 March 1999
A street kid holds Mitch hostage in an attempt to abduct his drug addict friend from Ward 17.
49	8	"Bloodlines"	Geoff Cawthorn	Annette Moore	23 March 1999
When a Jehovah's Witness patient is admitted for treatment, Terri and Luke find themselves on opposing sides of an ethical dilemma.
50	9	"More Things in Heaven and Earth"	Malcolm McDonald	Bevan Lee	30 March 1999
Terri finds herself torn between her duty as a nurse and as a nun when she tries to help a young man confused about his sexuality.
51	10	"Pushed to the Limit"	Robert Klenner	Margaret Wilson	6 April 1999
Peter is pushed to the limit when his life seems to be falling apart and he considers taking drastic measures.
52	11	"Friends and Lovers"	Peter Fisk	Louise Crane-Bowes	13 April 1999
It's a guilt-stricken time for Peter when his son goes missing and he realises he needs to be a good father again.
53	12	"Judgement Day"	Peter Fisk	Charlie Strachan	20 April 1999
Emotions run high when Peter decides to leave All Saints. Connor's security guard friend Stewie is brought to the ward after being shot whilst preventing a robbery.
54	13	"Roll the Dice"	Catherine Roden	Michaeley O'Brien	27 April 1999
Professional boundaries are overstepped when Mitch and Luke clash over treatment for a girl with an aneurysm.
55	14	"My Mother, Myself"	Robert Klenner	Anthony Ellis	4 May 1999
Jared and Samantha's relationship is strained when her mother is admitted to Ward 17 and he learns why she hides her personal life from him.
56	15	"Get a Life"	Peter Fisk	Christina Milligan	11 May 1999
Mitch is forced to confront his fears when a cancer patient refuses treatment. Stephanie gets starry-eyed about a possible promotion.
57	16	"An Irish Lullaby"	Geoff Cawthorn	Lesley and Jenny Lewis	18 May 1999
It's a heartbreaking time for Samantha when her mother's condition worsens. Mitch uses his voodoo skills to help a deluded patient.
58	17	"Head to Head"	Catherine Roden	Kristen Dunphy	25 May 1999
It's a hard day out in the field for Ben and Luke when they come into conflict over their differing approaches to saving a man with his arm caught in a machine.
59	18	"Desperate Remedies"	Robert Klenner	Anthony Ellis & Alexa Wyatt	1 June 1999
Emotions run high when a patient claims to have been fully conscious during an agonising operation.
60	19	"The Human Touch"	Peter Fisk	Louise Crane-Bowes	8 June 1999
The ward staff break hospital rules to save a patient's life – but will they pay heavy consequences?
61	20	"Disaster Plan"	Geoff Cawthorn	Margaret Wilson	15 June 1999
Ward 17 is in turmoil when a suicide victim's body starts exuding toxic gas and everyone must be evacuated.
62	21	"Forget-Me-Nots"	Catherine Roden	Charlie Strachan	22 June 1999
Luke performs a simple tonsillectomy on a young singer and then finds himself using all his medical skills in a race against time to save his patient's life.
63	22	"Shoot the Messenger"	Robert Klenner	Grace Morris	29 June 1999
A teenager is guilt-stricken when he is given the green light to receive donor lungs and his twin brother, suffering the same illness, is not.
64	23	"In With the New"	Peter Fisk	Annette Moore & Sally Webb	6 July 1999
Bronwyn becomes involved in the plight of a severely mentally disabled man whose only relative has just died.
65	24	"Second Chance"	Geoff Cawthorn	Bevan Lee	13 July 1999
Stephanie and Ben's marriage is put to the test when a patient alleges he assaulted her.
66	25	"Endgame"	Catherine Roden	Christina Milligan	20 July 1999
Terri begins to become suspicious of Neil and after indicating that she believes he could be suffering from Münchausen's, he leaves the ward. Luke's intern keeps going against his wishes. Connor feels uncomfortable around new, gay ward clerk Tony. Bron learns the truth about the seriousness of Ben and Steph's arguing. After trying to kill herself on Steph's watch, suicidal artist Cathy realises there's more to life after a trip to the morgue with Mitch. Neil puts a drill through his arm.
67	26	"Behind Closed Curtains"	Robert Klenner	David Phillips	27 July 1999
Von's mystery condition deepens after she believes she's responsible for a patient's internal bleed. Steph confides in Luke and tells him about her separation from Ben. Mitch attends a dinner with Terri and her parents. Terri helps her mother escape the violence of her father. Bron and Ben bring in a couple who are cheating on their spouses and Jared later mistakenly reveals the affair. Connor continues to act awkward around Tony. After a phone call from Ben's mother, Steph begins to re-evaluate her separation.
68	27	"Lesser of Two Evils"	Peter Fisk	Louise Crane-Bowes	3 August 1999
Connor's procedural mistake leads to a patient falsely accusing him of theft. Steph becomes annoyed while dealing with a family of hypochondriacs. After he and Bron get called out to a man who never got to propose to his late girlfriend, Ben begins to realise that his separation with Steph was the wrong way to go. Von and Terri clash over a mother's religious beliefs and the effects that she is having on her daughter. Luke, Tony and Connor have very different views on Jared's patient with sizable genitalia.
69	28	"A Whole Lot to Lose"	Di Drew	John Banas	10 August 1999
Luke and Terri fight against time to save a priest who fears hospitals. Von bonds with the mother of the CEO of the hospital. Steph and Mitch work on a drug addict who fakes having kidney stones to get free pethidine. Between Connor's homophobic behaviour and Mitch's persistence, Tony sticks himself on the needle of a Hepatitis C patient. Ben becomes jealous when Bron tells him that Luke and Steph are going on a date. Von's test results come back and Mitch reveals that she has lupus.
70	29	"Just Like a Woman"	Geoff Bennett	Alexa Wyatt	17 August 1999
Steph tries to push the blame of her separation onto Bron. Connor has trouble treating a transsexual woman when he discovers that it is his old football coach. Von deals with a difficult chef who has diabetes. Terri is slightly jealous when she sees Mitch and Juliette kissing. Tony waits patiently for his blood test results. Luke tries to hide the truth about how bad his date with Steph went. Mitch tries to get Von to seek treatment for her condition. After taking a patient to the hospital, Ben has sex with her.
71	30	"Three's a Crowd"	Catherine Roden	Chris Hawkshaw	24 August 1999
Kylie and Steph clash over a diabetic patient with hypertension. After his Cougars tickets go through the washing machine, Connor tries to score his patient's tickets only to learn he was bluffing. Jared nurses an elderly patient with a bad heart who has a very close friend. Von begins drinking soy milk in order to help her condition. Ben and Bron get prank called by a group of children. Tony and Connor bond over their mutual love for football. The doctors and nurses continue to get on each other's nerves.
72	31	"Time Bombs"	Peter Fisk	Peter Neale	31 August 1999
Tony and Connor are starstruck when Cougars footballer, Darren Rigg is admitted to the ward after a fall. Jared nurses a patient that he hit with his car. Terri has her clothes and underpants stolen. Mitch convinces Simone to have a liver biopsy. Ben receives an anonymous letter. Steph, Luke and Connor race against the clock to save an overweight lady who throat swells. Terri bumps into Neil Phillips. Jared goes to a gym and is impressed by a personal trainer. Ben and Steph get back together.
73	32	"Memories by Moonlight"	Peter Sharp	Charlie Strachan	7 September 1999
Bron and Ben are called out to a party overdose but run into some troubles when a group of teenage boys won't let them go. Von nurses a patient who suffers from a rare form of herpes that causes short-term memory loss. Connor grows frustrated with a sleepwalking patient. Steph, Von and Connor run into some trouble with the night shift manager. Mitch and Juliette's date is interrupted when Terri's mother turns up unexpectedly, after being hit by her father. Kylie and Steph forgive each other for their mistakes.
74	33	"True Love and the Blues"	Geoff Bennett	Serge Lazareff	14 September 1999
Luke and Bron's romance continues to blossom and they are brought even closer after Bron is bitten by a funnel web spider. Terri nurses a local court judge who gets shot by his son and realises how much she hates her father. Ben and Bron are called out to a young bug collector's house when she gets caught under her house. Simone and Darren are back in Ward 17 after she has a miscarriage and she tells him the truth about her history. Connor becomes jealous of Bron and Luke.
75	34	"Knowing Me, Knowing You"	Catherine Roden	David Phillips	21 September 1999
Connor nurses an Arabic patient who doesn't speak a word of English who is trying to tell him his diabetic son is locked in a car. Mitch and Von start exercising together. Steph nurses a patient with dementia and has to hold the peace between the patient's husband and daughter. Terri feels incredibly uncomfortable when the plumber that she hires turns out to be Neil Phillips. After a tough day at work, Steph and Ben reproclaim their love for each other. Bron is happy when she finds Ben and Steph having sex in the ambulance.
76	35	"When Duty Calls"	Peter Fisk	Louise Crane-Bowes	28 September 1999
Tony's test results come in and he learns he has hepatitis. Bron is ecstatic when she defibrillates a person for the first time, however this later turns to fear when her partner freezes. Tony and Mitch have some fun when a picture of the former and Connor is printed on the front page of the newspaper. Von asks off the case when she discovers her patient has polio and is forced to tell Terri about her SLE. Steph is slightly jealous when Terri assigns the polio case to Jared. Terri introduces Mitch and Rose for the first time.
77	36	"The Ties That Bind"	Mark Piper	Anthony Ellis	5 October 1999
Luke returns from Alaska and he and Bron have sex like bunny rabbits including once in Terri's office, only to be caught by Von. Connor runs into problems when he has to deal with a homosexual patient, dying with melanoma whose mother is a blatant homophobe. Steph nurses a young rockstar patient with cystic fibrosis who ends up trying to commit suicide with her boyfriend. Terri comes into work when she learns that there was an almost suicide on the ward. Bron splurges on a heater for the house.
78	37	"Lost and Found"	Geoff Bennett	Margaret Wilson	12 October 1999
Connor nurses Gabrielle Flanagan, a bone marrow donor whose child was stolen from her years prior. Terri works closely with the patient on the receiving end of the bone marrow as she deals with learning that she was adopted. Von and Mitch work on an elderly patient whose dying wish is to marry his lover. Bron and Ben are called out to a house whether they are forced to work on a couch because of a mentally unstable patient. Tony helps the couple organise their wedding before resigning and saying goodbye to Ward 17.
79	38	"The Stuff of Dreams"	Catherine Roden	Annette Moore	19 October 1999
Jared nurses a patient who has swallowed 20 condoms full of cocaine and when the patient's boyfriend arrives, shots are fired and Steph, Mitch and Luke are taken hostage. Ben and Bron work on a teenage boy whose scrotum got caught in his pant zipper. When Ward 17 gets an influx of patients after the hospital goes into lockdown, Connor has to put a patient on dialysis and Terri goes head-to-head with Dr Daley. Terri becomes jealous of Mitch and Rose as they embark on a dinner date.
80	39	"Outside the Square"	Peter Fisk	Andy Ryan	26 October 1999
Regina is distraught when she contacts a patient's son who is living in England and it turns out they aren't related at all, Ben runs into trouble when his ambulance is hijacked by a mentally unstable wannabe ambo. Luke and Steph both have trouble nursing a patient who is incredibly determined to have an abortion. Terri and Mitch work on the patient from England and have to tell him that he is riddled with cancer. Steph gets her exam results. Ben decides to tell Steph about his one-night stand.
81	40	"Everyone Loves a Winner"	Mark Piper	Chris Hawkshaw	2 November 1999
It's race day and tensions are running high as Bron begins gambling again. Sandra Gillespie, the new agency nurse, tries to make all the other nurses look bad. After Terri performs a tracheostomy on a neighbours child, Mitch takes her home and cooks her breakfast. After Mitch takes a scraping of Regina's rash and discovers that she has leprosy, it becomes apparent she has a crush on him. After being told she could move out of her apartment, Terri decides to have dinner with her Order.
82	41	"Blood and Water"	Kevin Carlin	Serge Lazareff	9 November 1999
Terri organises an anniversary breakfast for Ryan and Eileen, which later leads to a trip to Ward 17 when Terri defends her mother from her father. Jared deals with a hungover patient that does nude runs through the ward and urinates on his leg. Connor and Mitch deal with Eddie, a patient who was in a boat crash. Rob, a person on the boat with Eddie, tells the ward that if they help Eddie, they all deserve to die. Ben becomes suspicious that one of the hospital's anaesthetist is an addict. Terri and Eileen discover Ryan is dying of cancer.
83	42	"Life Class"	Catherine Roden	Charlie Strachan	16 November 1999
Ben and Bron are called out to a car crash and have to entail the help of Luke and the trauma team. The CEO's son, Julian does work experience alongside Von. Terminal patient, Dave Armstrong returns to the ward and decides that he wants to have treatment for his cancer. Luke has to perform open heart surgery at the scene of the crash. Terri has trouble treating Dave as it reminds her of her father. Von an Julian work on an unresponsive patient. Connor has a terrible sunburn that doesn't help his nursing.
84	43	"Ghosts of Christmas Past"	Peter Fisk	Louise Crane-Bowes	23 November 1999
Mitch and Connor tend to a patient who is paralysed. Mitch delivers Terri a Christmas tree. Jared works on a pregnant Jewish woman whose boyfriend's family don't approve of her. Regina tries and succeeds in getting Mitch to kiss her under the mistletoe. Connor is forced to play Joseph in the Christmas pageant. Mitch is forced to ask Terri if there is any chance for them and she reassures them there isn't. Steph delivers Ben some early Christmas news – she's pregnant. Terri invites everyone over for Christmas drinks and her tree has been decorated. Rose tells Terri that she's in love with Mitch. Neil watches Terri from outside her house.

== DVD release ==
The Complete Second Season
Set Details	Special Features
43 Episodes (1910 Mins.); Episodes 42–84; 11-Disc Set; 1:33:1 Fullscreen Aspect Ratio; English (Dolby Digital 2.0 Stereo); Distributed by EMI; Rated M; All Region Compatible	Slipcase Packaging
Release Dates	Slipcase Packaging
Australia	Slipcase Packaging
20 June 2006	Slipcase Packaging
