= Lawrence Block bibliography =

American author's publication list

This is a list of works by Lawrence Block, an American author of mystery fiction, with a career spanning six decades.

== Matthew Scudder novels ==
1. The Sins of the Fathers (1976)
2. Time to Murder and Create (1976)
3. In the Midst of Death (1976)
4. A Stab in the Dark (1981)
5. Eight Million Ways to Die (1982)
6. When the Sacred Ginmill Closes (1986)
7. Out on the Cutting Edge (1989)
8. A Ticket to the Boneyard (1990)
9. A Dance at the Slaughterhouse (1991)
10. A Walk Among the Tombstones (1992)
11. The Devil Knows You're Dead (1993)
12. A Long Line of Dead Men (1994)
13. Even the Wicked (1997)
14. Everybody Dies (1998)
15. Hope to Die (2001)
16. All the Flowers Are Dying (2005)
17. A Drop of the Hard Stuff (2011)
18. The Night and the Music (2013) (A collection of Matthew Scudder short stories and novelettes, 11 in total)
19. A Time to Scatter Stones (2019) (Novella)
20. The Autobiography of Matthew Scudder (2023)

== Bernie Rhodenbarr novels ==
1. Burglars Can't Be Choosers (1977)
2. The Burglar in the Closet (1978)
3. The Burglar Who Liked to Quote Kipling (1979)
4. The Burglar Who Studied Spinoza (1980)
5. The Burglar Who Painted Like Mondrian (1983)
6. The Burglar Who Traded Ted Williams (1994)
7. The Burglar Who Thought He Was Bogart (1995)
8. The Burglar in the Library (1997)
9. The Burglar in the Rye (1999)
10. The Burglar on the Prowl (2004)
11. The Burglar Who Counted the Spoons (2013)
12. The Burglar in Short Order (2020)
13. The Burglar who Met Fredric Brown (2022)

There are also three Bernie Rhodenbarr short stories: "Like a Thief in the Night" (Cosmopolitan, May 1983), "The Burglar Who Dropped In On Elvis" (Playboy, April 1990), and "The Burglar Who Smelled Smoke" (Mary Higgins Clark Mystery Magazine, Summer/Fall 1997). These stories are collected in the 2002 anthology Enough Rope, and in the Rhodenbarr book, The Burglar in Short Order.

== Evan Tanner novels ==
1. The Thief Who Couldn't Sleep (1966)
2. The Canceled Czech (1966)
3. Tanner's Twelve Swingers (1967)
4. The Scoreless Thai (also known as Two for Tanner; 1968)
5. Tanner's Tiger (1968)
6. Here Comes a Hero (also known as Tanner's Virgin; 1968)
7. Me Tanner, You Jane (1970)
8. Tanner on Ice (1998)

== Chip Harrison novels/stories (as Chip Harrison) ==
1. No Score (1970)
2. Chip Harrison Scores Again (1971)
3. Make Out With Murder (a.k.a. The Five Little Rich Girls) (1974)
4. The Topless Tulip Caper (1975)
5. "As Dark As Christmas Gets" (1997), a Chip Harrison short story written specifically for customers of the Otto Penzler–owned Mysterious Bookshop; printed in booklet format for the 1997 holiday season, and collected in Christmas at The Mysterious Bookshop (Vanguard Press 2010, ISBN 978-1-59315-617-6)

A collection of eighty-four short stories, Enough Rope (2002), contains two Chip Harrison stories.

== Keller novels ==
1. Hit Man (1998)
2. Hit List (2000)
3. Hit Parade (2006)
4. Hit and Run (2008)
5. Hit Me (2013)
6. Keller's Fedora (2016) (Novella)

A collection of eighty-four short stories, Enough Rope (2002), contains excerpts from the five Keller novels, plus the novella.

== Written as Jill Emerson ==
- Warm and Willing (1964)
- Enough of Sorrow (1965)
- Thirty (1970)
- Threesome (1970)
- A Madwoman's Diary (1972)
- The Trouble with Eden (1973)
- A Week as Andrea Benstock (1975)
- Getting Off (2011)
- Shadows (2016) (reissue of Strange Are the Ways of Love)

== Written as Paul Kavanagh ==
- Such Men Are Dangerous (1969)
- The Triumph of Evil (1971)
- Not Comin' Home to You (1974)

== Written as Sheldon Lord ==
- Carla (Midwood Books, 1958)
- Born to Be Bad (Tower Publications, 1959)
- 69 Barrow Street (Tower Publications, 1959)
- A Strange Kind of Love (Tower Publications, 1960)
- Of Shame and Joy: An Original Novel (Midwood Books, 1960)
- A Woman Must Love (Tower Publications, 1960)
- Kept Midwood 035 (Tower Publications, 1960)
- Candy (Tower Publications, 1960)
- 21 Gay Street: An Original Novel (Tower Publications, 1960)
- April North (Beacon Books, 1961)
- Pads are for Passion (Beacon Books, 1961) (reissued by Hard Case Crime as A Diet of Treacle)
- Community of Women (Beacon Books, 1963)
- The Sex Shuffle (Beacon Books, 1964) (reissued by Hard Case Crime as Lucky at Cards)
- Savage Lover (Softcover Library, 1968) (written in 1958; reissued by Hard Case Crime as Sinner Man)

== Written as Andrew Shaw ==
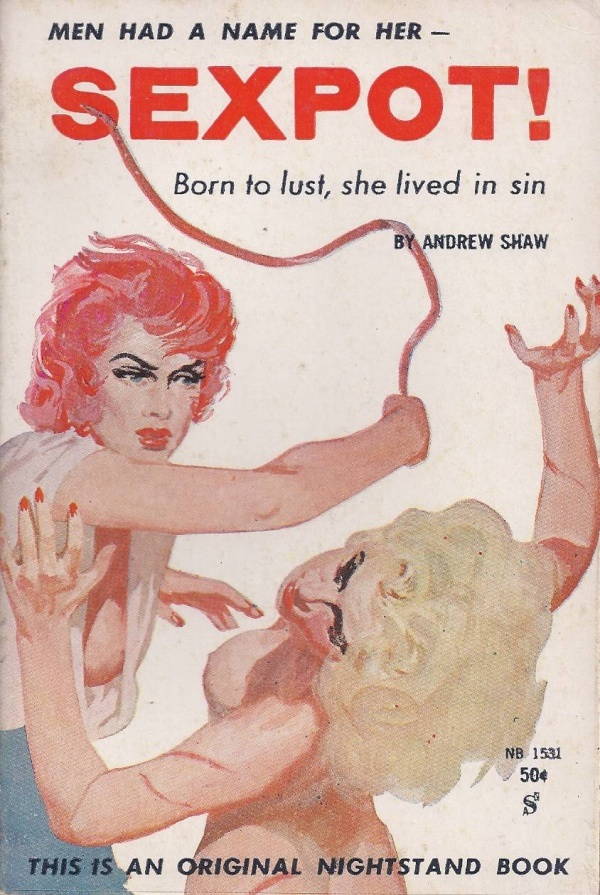
Sexpot!, published under the pseudonym of Andrew Shaw. Cover illustration by Harold W. McCauley (1960).

- Campus Tramp (Nightstand Books, 1959)
- The Adulterers (Corinth Publications, 1960)
- High School Sex Club (Nightstand Books, 1960)
- College for Sinners (Corinth Publications, 1960)
- Sexpot! (Nightstand Books, 1960)
- The Twisted Ones (Nightstand Books, 1961)
- $20 Lust (Corinth Publications, 1961) (reissued as Cinderella Sims by Greenleaf Classics)
- Gutter Girl (Bedstand Books, 1961)
- Lover (Nightstand Books, 1961) (reissued as Gigolo Johnny Wells)
- Sin Devil (Nightstand Books, 1961)
- Four Lives at the Crossroads (1962)

== Written as Don Holliday ==
- Circle of Sinners (1961) - in collaboration with Hal Dresner
- Border Lust (1962) (reissued by Hard Case Crime as Borderline)

== Written as Lesley Evans ==
- Strange Are the Ways of Love (1959) (reissued in 2016 as Shadows, by Jill Emerson)

== Written as Lee Duncan ==
- Fidel Castro Assassinated (1961) (reissued by Hard Case Crime as Killing Castro)

== Written as Anne Campbell Clark ==
- Passport to Peril (1967)

== Written as Ben Christopher ==
- Strange Embrace (1962) - written as a tie-in to TV series Johnny Midnight

== In collaboration with Donald E. Westlake ==
- A Girl Called Honey (Midwood Books, 1960, credited to Sheldon Lord and Alan Marshall)
- So Willing (Midwood Books, 1960, credited to Sheldon Lord and Alan Marshall)
- Sin Hellcat (Nightstand Books, 1961, credited to Andrew Shaw)

== Other fiction ==
- Babe in the Woods (1960) - Block ghostwrote this novel following the death of author William Ard (only Ard is credited)
- Death Pulls a Doublecross (1961) (reissued as Coward's Kiss)
- Mona (1961) (reissued as Sweet Slow Death and by Hard Case Crime as Grifter's Game)
- Markham (1961) (reissued as You Could Call It Murder) - written and published as a tie-in to TV series Markham
- The Girl with the Long Green Heart (1965)
- Deadly Honeymoon (1967)
- After the First Death (1969)
- The Specialists (1969)
- Ronald Rabbit Is a Dirty Old Man (1971)
- Ariel (1980)
- Code of Arms (1981)
- Into the Night (1987) - Block completed this novel from a manuscript by Cornell Woolrich
- Random Walk (1988)
- Small Town (2003)
- The Girl with the Deep Blue Eyes (2015)
- Dead Girl Blues (2020)

== Short Stories & Collections ==
- Sometimes They Bite (1983)
- Like a Lamb to Slaughter (1984)
- Some Days You Get the Bear: Collected Stories (1994)
- Enough Rope: Collected Stories (2002)
- One Night Stands and Lost Weekends (2009)
- "Dolly's Trash and Treasures" (written for audio presentation in The Sounds of Crime) (2010)
- The Night and the Music (2011)
- Ehrengraf for the Defense (2012)
- Catch and Release (2013)
- "I Know How to Pick Em" (2013) (short story in anthology Dangerous Women) (2013)
- Defender of the Innocent: The Casebook of Martin Ehrengraf (2014)
- Dark City Lights: New York Stories (2015)
- In Sunlight or in Shadow (editor and contributor, 2016)
- Resume Speed and Other Stories (2018)

== Screenplay ==
- My Blueberry Nights (2007, co-written with Wong Kar-wai)

== Books for writers ==
- Writing the Novel from Plot to Print (1979)
- Telling Lies for Fun & Profit (1981) [a collection of his slightly re-edited fiction how-to column from Writer's Digest]
- Write for Your Life (1986)
- Spider, Spin Me a Web (1987)
- The Liar's Bible (2011)
- The Liar's Companion (2011)
- Afterthoughts (2011)
- Writing the Novel From Plot to Print to Pixel (2016)

== Memoirs ==
- Step by Step: A Pedestrian Memoir (2009)
- A Writer Prepares (2021)
