= Babes in the Wood murders (Epping Forest) =

Double murder in England in 1970

- The April 1970 Metropolitan Police circular distributed in the manhunt to locate Blatchford and Hanlon
- Date: 31 March 1970
- Location: Epping Forest, Essex, England, UK 51.657°N 0.004°E (approximate)
- Cause: Strangulation
- Motive: Child sexual abuse Rape
- Inquest: Open verdict (1970); Murder (1998)
- Convicted: Ronald Jebson
- Charges: Murder
- Sentence: Life imprisonment

The Babes in the Wood murders are the murders of two children which occurred in a copse in Sewardstone, Essex on 31 March 1970. The victims, Susan Muriel Blatchford (age 11) and Gary John Hanlon (age 12), were lured from an unknown location close to their north London homes into a copse on the outskirts of Epping Forest, where they were raped and murdered by known paedophile Ronald Jebson. Their bodies were discovered on 17 June, 78 days after the two were reported missing by their parents.

The case remained unsolved for almost thirty years until 61-year-old Jebson, serving a life sentence for the 1974 murder of an eight-year-old girl named Rosemary Papper, confessed to their rape and murder in 1998. He was convicted of both murders in May 2000. Jebson subsequently died in prison in 2015.

Blatchford and Hanlon became known as the "Babes in the Wood" due to the location of their murders and the subsequent discovery of their bodies. They also became known by this epithet as the coroner was unable to determine if they died of exposure or foul play at the initial inquest into their deaths, leaving an initial possibility the children had died by misadventure.

== Disappearance ==
Shortly after 4:30 p.m. on the afternoon of 31 March 1970, 11-year-old Susan Blatchford left her home in Riley Road, Enfield, north London, to call at the home of her school friend, 12-year-old Gary Hanlon, who lived in nearby Marrilyne Avenue. Hanlon's mother, Beryl, answered the door. According to Beryl, Blatchford simply asked the question, "Is Gary there?" Shortly after her son joined his friend outside the front door, he asked his mother for permission to join his friend for a walk. His mother agreed, upon the promise he would return in one hour for dinner. The two are known to have walked down Marrilyne Avenue hand-in-hand, with Hanlon holding his football beneath one arm.

The final verifiable sighting of Blatchford and Hanlon occurred at approximately 5:30 p.m. On this occasion, the two were seen walking across a nearby field. No known subsequent sightings of the two were reported to police. Missing person reports were filed by both sets of parents at Ponders End police station at approximately 8 p.m. the same evening.

=== Investigation ===
The following day, the Metropolitan Police launched an intense manhunt to locate the children. This operation was headed by Chief Superintendent Leonard Read, and at its peak 600 officers were assigned full-time to the case. Concern for the children's welfare was heightened by the fact that on the night of their disappearance, the temperature had fallen below freezing point, and the morning of 1 April saw a snowfall across Enfield.

On 1 April, Superintendent Read visited both families to learn more about their children's friendship. Read quickly discovered Blatchford—the youngest of four sisters—was the more confident character of the two, and although she occasionally experimented with make-up and had recently begun flirting with boys her age, was very much a tomboy and enjoyed playing football, climbing trees and playing with boys' toys such as Hornby train sets. Furthermore, at the time of her disappearance, Blatchford was markedly excited about the upcoming wedding of her sister Linda, in which she was to be a bridesmaid. Hanlon, although described by his family as a "plucky boy", was shy by comparison. Hanlon was the youngest of three siblings. He enjoyed exercise, and his one great love was football. This shared interest had been a major factor in the children's friendship.

Investigators quickly discounted any possibility of the children having run away, as neither had taken any personal possessions and the two had only recently become acquainted at Albany School. Missing person posters distributed described Blatchford as 5 ft (150 cm) in height and wearing a green raincoat with red, stitched pockets, a floral blouse, and brown corduroy slacks. Hanlon was described as being just 4 ft 2in (130 cm) in height and was last seen wearing a brown cardigan, a fawn patterned pullover, and blue jeans. (Note: Blatchford was physically well-developed for her age. Contemporary reports describe her as appearing one or two years older than her eleven years. Hanlon was markedly small for a twelve-year-old and appeared one or two years younger.)

Police conducted house-to-house inquiries at over 4,350 homes locally, and over 15,000 people—including several known sex offenders—were interviewed. Over 200 potential sightings of the children were investigated, although each failed to prove fruitful. Underwater search and recovery units searched local rivers, canals, reservoirs, and flooded gravel pits. Search and rescue dogs were also used to scour over 5,000 acres of local fields and woodland, and on 14 April, the Daily Mirror published a national front-page article, offering £1,000 for the children's safe return. Despite these efforts, no clue as to the location or fate of either child was uncovered. By mid-April, Scotland Yard had become active in the manhunt, and the search for Blatchford and Hanlon had expanded nationwide.

== Discovery ==
Eleven weeks later, on the evening of 17 June 1970, the bodies of both children were discovered in a bird-watchers' hide inside a densely wooded copse by a young man named Leonard Cook, who had been walking his Labrador dog through the edge of Epping Forest. According to Cook's statement to investigators, his dog had entered the copse and refused to return. When he had entered the copse to search for his dog, he observed a child's foot inside what appeared to be a hide fashioned from branches and bracken. The copse was less than six walking miles from the children's homes, within sight of Sewardstone Road at Lippitts Hill, and had been searched by police officers and search dogs on 9 April. (Note: Due to the fact the area where the bodies were actually discovered was so overgrown, police had allowed search and rescue dogs to examine this section of the copse alone. When the searchers were later asked how they expected such dogs to react to discovering a body, one officer simply replied he did not know, whereas the other stated he expected the dog to refuse to move from the location.)

Both children were discovered lying on their backs, side by side, with Blatchford's arm found draped across Hanlon's body. Their bodies were covered with leaves, twigs and branches. Clothing belonging to both—including underwear—had been removed from their bodies, and Blatchford's slacks had been torn along the inner seams in a manner suggesting the garment had been purposely ripped from the waist downwards. Both bodies were so badly decomposed that pathologist James Cameron could only confirm their identities via dental records.

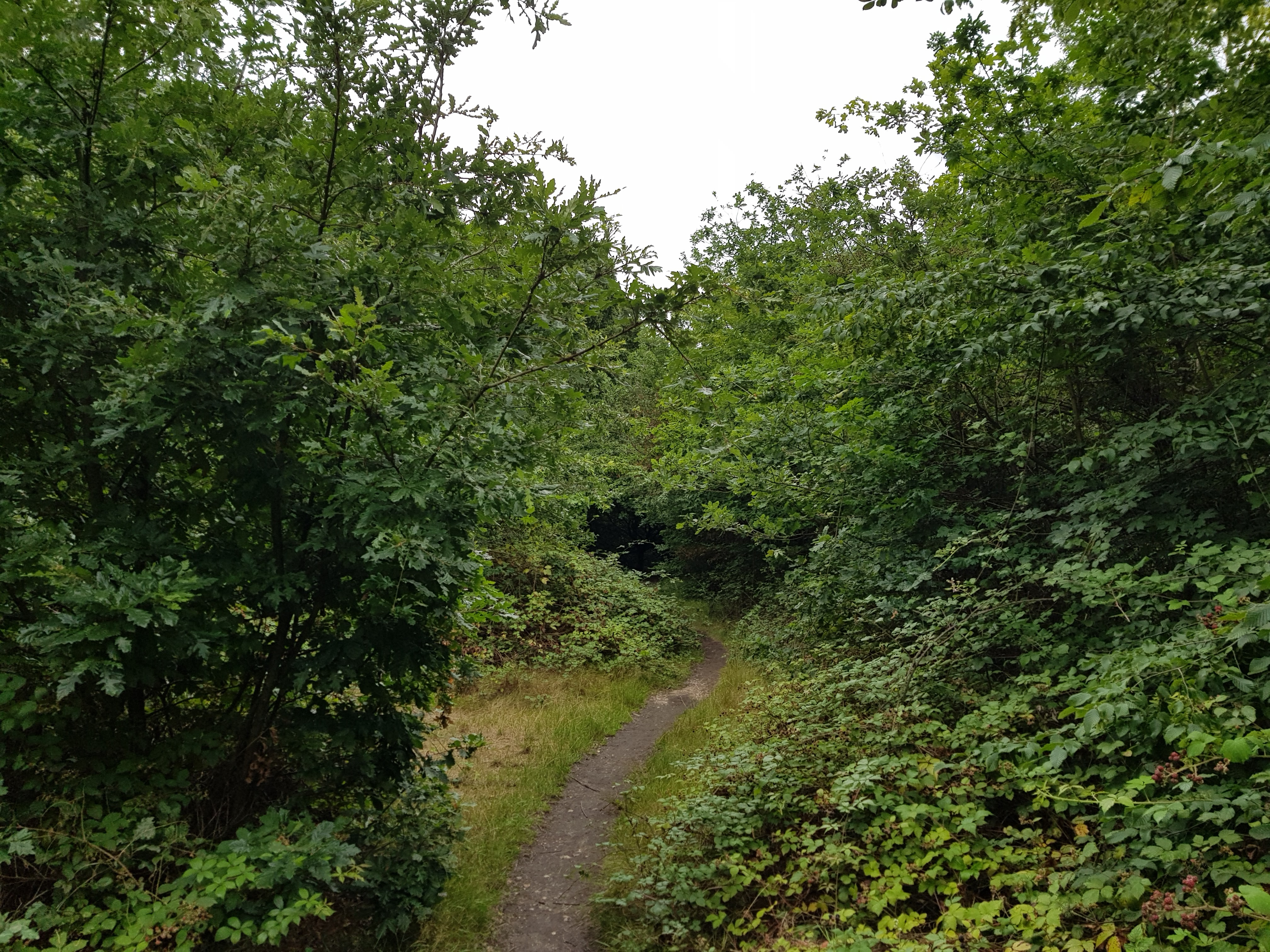
An overgrown section of Epping Forest. The bodies of Blatchford and Hanlon were discovered in a largely impenetrable location such as this on 17 June 1970.

Although sections of the press speculated the children had died of exposure due to the climate on 31 March and 1 April, the clothing of each child strongly indicated both had been redressed after their deaths, leading both sets of parents and several police officers to strongly suspect they had not died of natural causes. (Note: Hanlon's shoes were found several feet from his body, whereas Blatchford's bra, knickers, tights, socks and shoes had been removed.) However, due to the extensive decomposition of both bodies, very little forensic evidence remained.

== Initial inquest ==
The inquest into the deaths of Blatchford and Hanlon was held in September 1970. At this hearing, the coroner, Charles Clarke, was unable to determine a cause of death for either child or determine whether either had been the victim of any form of sexual assault. As such, Clarke returned an open verdict in the case, ruling the missing and removed clothing may have been caused by the wild animals which had evidently extensively attacked both bodies. Although Superintendent Read attempted to convince his superiors at Scotland Yard that all the known facts of the case clearly indicated the children had been abducted and murdered, he was informed that no financial or physical resources could continue to be used on a case of murder he could not prove had been committed.

=== Cold case ===
The deaths of Blatchford and Hanlon were never classified as a murder investigation, and none of the physical evidence recovered at the crime scene was preserved. The case gradually became cold, although several senior investigators never doubted the insistence of Read that the deaths were a clear case of murder. In his final report pertaining to the case, Read wrote: "Unless somebody surrenders himself or comes into custody and admits this offence, it is most unlikely that it will ever be resolved."

Both sets of parents also remained convinced that their children had not died via a form of misadventure or natural causes. Blatchford's mother, Muriel, is known to have repeatedly remarked to reporters following the coroner's inquest that the "only animal" capable of removing her daughter's underwear, tights, and bra but leaving her raincoat and blouse intact must have been a human male.

== Contact with authorities ==
In May 1996, convicted paedophile and child killer Ronald Jebson contacted Scotland Yard to offer information regarding the Babes in the Wood murders. Initially, Jebson claimed to have witnessed the children's murder, but to have not been responsible for their deaths, which he blamed on Robert and Maureen Papper—the parents of the eight-year-old girl he had murdered in 1974 and for whose murder he was serving a term of life imprisonment at HM Prison Wakefield. His claims the two had lured both children into his car, then "raped and buggered" both in a cellar for several days before discarding their bodies on the outskirts of Epping Forest—with his being an accessory after the fact with regards to the disposal of their bodies—were investigated, but quickly discounted. (Note: The 1996 questioning of Jebson revealed his years of incarceration had fuelled rich psychological fantasies regarding many aspects of Jebson's past within his mind. According to one investigator, Jebson "and the truth had long since parted company". His motive for blaming the Pappers for the Babes in the Wood murders was likely a form of gratuitous revenge sourcing from previous grudges.)

== Perpetrator ==
Ronald Jebson was born Ronald Harper in August 1938. He was conceived outside of wedlock and was adopted as an infant. His adoptive parents subsequently changed his surname to Jebson.

Jebson was raised in Hatfield, Hertfordshire. He was a loner who had been convicted of indecent exposure at age 15 and had begun actively sexually abusing children shortly thereafter. He is also known to have formed a close friendship with paedophile Sidney Cooke. By 1958, Jebson was an alcoholic and amphetamine addict. Unable to hold any form of employment for a length of time, he had enlisted in the British Army in 1960 but had been discharged following a period of being absent without leave.

By 1970, Jebson had amassed a lengthy criminal record for various offences ranging from petty theft to rape. His most recent conviction had been for the December 1968 sexual assault of a six-year-old girl of acquaintances of his whom he had molested in her bedroom. He had been released from custody for this offence on 2 March 1970, meaning he had been at liberty for just 29 days when he abducted Blatchford and Hanlon.

Eleven days after the murders, Jebson was arrested in Nottingham for sexually abusing an 11-year-old boy whom he had lured into his car and driven to nearby woodland. He was sentenced to five years' imprisonment for this offence, to be served at HM Prison Wandsworth.

=== Third murder ===
Jebson was released from prison in 1973 and subsequently moved into the Hatfield home of his former school friend Robert Papper, concealing the truth behind his criminal convictions for child molestation from the family. He left the Pappers' household in the spring of 1974 following an argument stemming from Maureen Papper's general unease regarding his demeanour around their six children, particularly their eight-year-old daughter, Rosemary Ann. According to Robert Papper, his wife discreetly informed him: "I don't like him. There's just something about him I just don't like."

Reportedly, Jebson informed the Pappers as he left their household: "I'll do something you'll regret. I'll get even!" Shortly thereafter, in June 1974, he lured Rosemary from her school to a field where he forced the child to participate in sexual acts before strangling her with a piece of twine as he again raped her. Jebson then concealed Papper's body in a corner of the field. He was arrested the following day, and readily admitted to the murder.

Sentenced to life imprisonment with a recommendation he serve a minimum of twenty years' imprisonment for Papper's murder, Jebson was incarcerated at HM Prison Wakefield.

=== Confession ===
Two years after Jebson had initially contacted authorities, on 24 August 1998, he contacted Edmonton Police Station from HM Prison Wakefield. On this occasion, he expressed his wish to formally confess to the Babes in the Wood murders.

According to Jebson, early in the evening of 31 March 1970, he had encountered Blatchford and Hanlon by chance as he drove home from a job interview at a firm located on Ordnance Road, Enfield. (Note: Ordnance Road is located less than half a mile from Hanlon's Marrilyne Avenue home.) He had lured the children into his Standard Ten vehicle, plied both with alcohol and cannabis and driven the two to the edge of Epping Forest, where he had earlier constructed a hide with willow branches. Near this location, Jebson observed an open gateway, which he drove through before parking his vehicle at a location outside the actual copse where he had constructed this hide, but obscured from the view of potential witnesses.

Inside the copse, Jebson claimed his "aggressive nature" emerged as his alter ego—which he termed "Little Ron"—came to the fore although, to his frustration, both Blatchford and Hanlon resisted his initial efforts to sexually interfere with them. (Note: The verbatim of this section of Jebson's confession reads: "Inside the copse, my ... aggressive nature started to show. Susan didn't want to play, nor did Gary ... I tried again.") He had then become violent, first sexually assaulting, then strangling Blatchford as Hanlon watched in disbelief "not knowing what to do". When the boy remarked that he "[wanted] to go home", Jebson shouted, "You're going nowhere!" Hanlon then attempted to fight Jebson, who struck the boy in the face, then raped him as he strangled him. He had subsequently remained in the copse with their bodies until the early hours of the following morning before returning home. Both bodies were redressed and left lying side by side, approximately one foot apart. He had then left the crime scene, taking Blatchford's underwear as a keepsake.

Jebson further elaborated that, as a convicted child sex offender living locally, he had been questioned by police in relation to the disappearances in the days following the children's murder, but had denied any involvement. Sections of the false account as to his movements on the afternoon and evening in question which he provided to investigators were corroborated by independent witnesses, who had seen Jebson inside an Enfield labour exchange shortly before Blatchford and Hanlon disappeared. However, the sections of Jebson's statement regarding his movements following his job interview at the Ordnance Road firm in the hours following the children's disappearance were never verified.

=== Exhumation ===
Blatchford's body was exhumed from the grounds of St James's Church to undergo a second forensic examination in an effort to verify Jebson's verbal confession. (Note: Investigators were unable to examine Hanlon's body for injuries to corroborate Jebson's confession to having bludgeoned the boy's face and body prior to his strangulation murder, as his body had been cremated.) The bleeding noted within Blatchford's ribs was inconsistent with the symptoms of the bout of pneumonia she is known to have suffered shortly before her disappearance, but consistent with Jebson's verbal account of having beaten and strangled the child as he knelt upon her ribs.

== Conviction and imprisonment ==
On 28 March 2000, Jebson appeared at Brent Magistrates' Court to be formally charged with the Babes in the Wood murders. He later entered a formal plea of guilty to both murders before Judge David Stokes at the Old Bailey on 9 May, with his defence counsel, John Evison, arguing his client had chosen to confess because he did not wish to take his crimes to his grave. (Note: In reference to this argument, Detective Chief Inspector Declan Donnelly would later remark: "I personally do not think he confessed to clear his conscience. I think there is a certain element of status building [among paedophiles] in prison.")

Following a ninety-minute hearing, during which the prosecution played an audio recording of Jebson's confession to the courtroom, Jebson was sentenced to two further terms of life imprisonment, to be served concurrently with his existing life sentence.

Upon passing sentence, Judge Stokes branded Jebson a "wicked and perverted" individual, adding: "Thirty years ago you abducted, sexually assaulted and murdered two young children. What [these children] went through before they died does not bear thinking about. The only point that can be made on your part is that you have owned up to what you did, which caused a small degree of comfort to their close relatives, who are here to see justice done." (Note: Jebson's audio confession brought fresh anguish to the families of Blatchford and Hanlon—both of whom had hoped their child had not been subjected to sexual interference prior to their murder. Hanlon's mother, Beryl, later recollected: "That ... that, that, that was ... [h]is sort of thing, you know? What he done. That's what he did to children. For me it's been worse since I actually knew. I knew he'd been murdered. But, I couldn't cope with knowing he'd been, he'd been touched by somebody.")

"I always knew the children had been murdered, but, I had ... almost given up hope that the case would be solved. Jebson is a very, very sad man."

— Retired Chief Superintendent Leonard Read, addressing the media following Jebson's conviction of both murders. 9 May 2000.

== Aftermath ==
Following Jebson's conviction, Victims of Crime Trust spokesman and former police officer Norman Brennan informed the media: "The torment and torture that the families of these victims have gone through for thirty years is beyond words."

On the day of Jebson's conviction, the families of Blatchford and Hanlon congratulated retired Chief Superintendent Leonard Read and his successor, Detective Chief Inspector Declan Donnelly, for their collective insistence their children had been murdered despite the coroner's initial open verdict and their perseverance in ensuring the perpetrator's eventual confession and conviction. The parents of both children subsequently appealed to the Home Secretary, Jack Straw, to impose a whole life tariff to ensure Jebson died in jail.

Both mothers thanked Read for his initial efforts in attempting to keep the case active as a murder inquiry in spite of the legal obstacles he had faced, although Read emphasised to the families and media that, had Donnelly not been persistent in his efforts to obtain Jebson's confession following his own retirement, the case would likely have remained unsolved.

In 2002, Jebson was transferred from HM Prison Wakefield to HM Prison Frankland in County Durham. He was never paroled from his life sentences. Altogether, he spent more than forty years in prison for the murders of Rosemary Papper, Susan Blatchford and Gary Hanlon.

Ronald Jebson died of kidney failure at the University Hospital of North Durham on 17 April 2015 at the age of 76, having signed an order instructing medical personnel that he not be resuscitated. He died alone, had no friends or family and informed staff he had no contacts whom he wished to be informed of his death, which was not disclosed to the media until 27 April.

== Media ==
=== Television ===
- The documentary television series Real Crime has broadcast a fifty-minute documentary focusing upon the Babes in the Wood murders. Directed by Frank Simmonds, this documentary, titled The Truth about the Babes in the Wood, was initially broadcast in July 2002.
- The Crime & Investigation Network have broadcast an episode focusing on the murders committed by Ronald Jebson as part of their Murder Casebook series. Presented by Fred Dinenage, this 45-minute episode was first broadcast in November 2013 and features interviews with criminologist David Wilson.

=== Literature ===
- Innes, Brian (2000). Bodies of Evidence. Amber Books Ltd. ISBN 978-1-856-05623-6.
- Lane, Brian (1991). The Murder Guide to Great Britain. Robinson Publishing Ltd. ISBN 978-1-845-02937-1.
- McRery, Nigel (2013). Silent Witnesses: A History of Forensic Science. Random House Books. ISBN 978-1-845-02937-1.
- Morris, Jim (2015). The Who's Who of British Crime in the Twentieth Century. Amberley Publishing. ISBN 978-1-445-63924-6
- Odell, Robin (2010). The Mammoth Book of Bizarre Crimes. Robinson Publishing. ISBN 978-1-849-01436-6.
- Sanders, John (2008). Inside the Mind of the Sex Killer. Forum Press. ISBN 978-1-874-35840-4
- Weir, Nigel (2011). British Serial Killers. Author House Publishing. ISBN 978-1-467-88139-5

== See also ==
- Child abduction
- Child abuse
- Child sexual abuse
- Cold case
- List of serial killers by number of victims
- List of solved missing person cases: 1950–1999
- Recidivism – Person repeating an undesirable behavior following punishment

== Cited works and further reading ==
- Berry-Dee, Christopher (2021). A Special Place in Hell: The World's Most Depraved Serial Killers. Ad Lib Publishers Ltd. ISBN 978-1-913-54375-4.
- Duffy, Wendy (2003). Children and Bereavement. Church House Publishing. ISBN 0-715-14998-9.
- Forsyth, Frederick (2003). Reader's Digest: Crime Files. Reader's Digest. ISBN 978-0-276-42810-4.
- Gudjonsson, Gisli (1999). The Psychology of Interrogations, Confessions and Testimony. John Wiley & Sons, Inc. ISBN 978-0-471-96177-2.
- Hickey, Eric W. (2009). Serial Murderers and Their Victims. Wadsworth Publishing Co. ISBN 978-0-495-60081-7.
- Lane, Brian (1995), Chronicle of 20th Century Murder. Select Editions, ISBN 978-0-425-14649-1
- Morris, Jim (2015). The Who's Who of British Crime in the Twentieth Century. Amberley Publishing. ISBN 978-1-445-63924-6
- Ramsland, Katherine; McGrain, Patrick N. (2010). Inside the Minds of Sexual Predators. Praeger Publishing. ISBN 978-0-313-37960-4.
- Weir, Nigel (2012). British Serial Killers. Author House Publishing. ISBN 978-1-467-88139-5.
