= All Saints season 1 =

All Saints
- Season 1
- Season 1, Volume 4 DVD
- No. of episodes: 41

Release
- Original network: Seven Network
- Original release: 24 February – 17 November 1998

Season chronology
- Next → Season 2

The first season of the long-running Australian medical drama All Saints began airing on 24 February 1998 and concluded on 17 November 1998 with a total of 41 episodes.

== Plot ==
Medical drama focusing on the working and personal lives of the doctors and nurses working on the front line of a busy inner city Emergency Department at All Saints Hospital.

== Cast and characters ==
=== Regular ===
- Georgie Parker as Terri Sullivan
- Jeremy Cumpston as Connor Costello
- Sam Healy as Jaz Hillerman
- Martin Lynes as Luke Forlano
- Judith McGrath as Von Ryan
- Andrew McKaige as Peter Morrison
- Libby Tanner as Bronwyn Craig
- Ben Tari as Jared Levine
- Kirrily White as Stephanie Markham

=== Semi-Regular ===
- Brian Vriends as Ben Markham (29 episodes)
- Elizabeth Maywald as Sophie Williams (17 episodes)
- Justine Clarke as Samantha O'Hara (8 episodes)

=== Recurring ===
- Steve Jacobs as Harry Williams (2 episodes)

=== Guest ===
- Kim Hillas as Joan Marden (5 episodes)
- Michael Caton as Bob Parkin (7 episodes)

Maggie Dence, Kym Wilson, Bridie Carter, Peter Gwynne, June Salter, Matt Doran, Linda Hartley, Max Phipps, Rod Mullinar, Virginia Hey, Joyce Jacobs, Betty Bobbitt, Charles "Bud" Tingwell, Anna Hruby, and John Walton.

== Episodes ==
| No. overall | No. in season | Title | Directed by | Written by | Original release date |
|---|---|---|---|---|---|
| 1 | 1 | "Body and Soul" | Peter Sharp | Howard Griffiths | 24 February 1998 |
Nurse Unit Manager Terri Sullivan manages the 'general medical ward' at All Saints Western General Hospital. Affectionately known as "The Garbage Ward", it takes the overflow of patients from all the other wards.
| 2 | 2 | "Everybody's Human" | Mark Piper | Susan Bower | 24 February 1998 |
Terri arrives at work to find Dr. Harry Williams has been admitted to the ward with a mild cardiac condition and he becomes the patient from Hell.
| 3 | 3 | "Gut Feeling" | Grant Brown | Susan Bower | 3 March 1998 |
Ben saves the life of a drug dealer who is the victim of a stabbing attack. Connor disputes the diagnosis of a new intern while he is looking after Scott, an anxious country boy.
| 4 | 4 | "A Question of Strength" | Richard Sarell | Bevan Lee | 10 March 1998 |
Bron faces the dilemma of becoming too attached to a patient. Jared discovers that Angie lied to him about continuing her out-patients treatment. Terri goes into battle with the bureaucrats.
| 5 | 5 | "Night Shift" | Richard Jasek | Anthony Ellis | 17 March 1998 |
When Jaz collapses after being slipped a party drug, Connor and Bron put their careers on the line to care for her. Jared introduces his fiance to Ben and Stephanie.
| 6 | 6 | "Give and Take" | Mark Piper | Grant Fraser | 24 March 1998 |
Preparations for a sibling kidney transplant go awry. Bron's professionalism is put to the test and Jared has an unexpected admirer.
| 7 | 7 | "Combat Zone" | Peter Sharp | Ro Hume | 31 March 1998 |
Von has to come to terms with her past when a long lost friend is admitted to Ward 17. Terri encourages a young woman from a different culture to make her own choices.
| 8 | 8 | "Think Positive" | Mark Piper | Grant Fraser & Andy Ryan | 7 April 1998 |
Bron's favourite patient, is readmitted with pneumonia and is stunned with the news that his illness could be HIV related. Sophie has difficulty juggling work and being a single mother.
| 9 | 9 | "Forget Me Not" | Karl Zwicky | Greg Haddrick | 14 April 1998 |
Jared worries when a new mother rejects her child, and when the baby goes missing, the teenage mum is the prime suspect.
| 10 | 10 | "A Little Magic" | Richard Sarell | Louise Crane-Bowes | 21 April 1998 |
Terri finds herself unable to separate professional ethics from her personal beliefs when a witch is admitted to the ward.
| 11 | 11 | "Terminal Speed" | Peter Sharp | Annette Moore | 28 April 1998 |
Raelene is admitted to the ward and Peter and Connor suspect that she is bulimic. Steph finally decides to act upon her dream of becoming a doctor.
| 12 | 12 | "Heart to Heart" | Di Drew | David Phillips | 5 May 1998 |
A high profile lawyer arrives for a coronary by-pass, but her irresponsible attitude towards her own health makes the surgeons decide to postpone the operation.
| 13 | 13 | "The Hard Yards" | Scott Feeney | Margaret Wilson | 12 May 1998 |
Connor is horrified to learn that his rugby hero has been admitted to Ward 17. Jared's ex-girlfriend turns up wanting to talk about their break-up.
| 14 | 14 | "Goodnight Sweetheart" | Karl Zwicky | David Allen | 19 May 1998 |
Terri has been up all night comforting Peter who cannot accept that his wife is brain-dead. She also has the difficult task of asking Peter to give consent for Jenny's organs to be donated.
| 15 | 15 | "Crimes of the Heart" | Paul Faint | Julie Monton | 26 May 1998 |
Terri mourns for Jenny and struggles with the breakdown of her friendship with Peter. Connor finds himself nursing an AIDS patient through his last days.
| 16 | 16 | "Nothing But the Truth" | Di Drew | Andy Ryan & Katherine Thomson | 2 June 1998 |
The arrival of two high-dependency patients and an incompetent agency nurse increase the stress and workload in Ward 17.
| 17 | 17 | "Babes in the Woods" | Scott Feeney | Louise Crane-Bowes | 9 June 1998 |
Terri and Peter are forced to put a young girl's emotional health at risk in order to save the life of a newborn baby. Jared is thrilled by Angie's attempts to get her life back on track.
| 18 | 18 | "Sounds of Silence" | Grant Brown | Chris Phillips | 16 June 1998 |
Stephanie supports a woman's decision to have a cochlear implant against her deaf husband's wishes. Jared teaches an old man how to be independent and learns a lesson in return.
| 19 | 19 | "Hard Day's Night" | Leigh Spence | Grant McAloon | 23 June 1998 |
Luke is put through the wringer when a patient deteriorates before his eyes. Jared learns more harsh truths about Angie.
| 20 | 20 | "Revelations" | Paul Faint | Anthony Ellis-Morris | 30 June 1998 |
A young mother has a cardiac arrest and a near death experience. Jaz helps three elderly patients feel worthwhile. Von brings out the devil in an otherwise shy, gentleman patient.
| 21 | 21 | "Smooth Operator" | Karl Zwicky | Marcia Gardner | 7 July 1998 |
Luke falls under the spell of a man-hungry female surgical consultant. Jared ignores his instincts and botches the treatment of a patient.
| 22 | 22 | "Truth or Dare" | Karl Steinberg | Ro Hume | 14 July 1998 |
Von tries to help a diabetic youth adjust to life in the workforce. Ben is lured into a deserted park which results in him being a patient in Accident and Emergency.
| 23 | 23 | "Possession" | Leigh Spence | Ro Hume | 21 July 1998 |
Terri faces echoes from her past when she helps a victim of domestic violence. Bronwyn has an unpleasant shock when the new head of cardiothoracic surgery arrives at All Saints.
| 24 | 24 | "The Price You Pay" | Peter Sharp | Peter Kinloch & Louise Crane | 28 July 1998 |
A rookie cop is brought into the ward suffering from a gunshot wound and suspected spinal injuries. Bronwyn tries to teach a young binge drinker about his serious medical condition.
| 25 | 25 | "A Mother's Love" | Geoff Cawthorn | Tracey Trinder-Doig & Andy Ryan | 4 August 1998 |
While Stephanie tries to adjust to the idea of being pregnant, she is assigned to nurse a dying woman who wants to hold on for the birth of her grandchild.
| 26 | 26 | "Touch and Go" | Robert Klenner | Bevan Lee | 11 August 1998 |
Terri's faith is tested when her best friend and mentor, Sister Marguerite, undergoes a startling personality change.
| 27 | 27 | "Yesterday's News" | Catherine Roden | Louise Crane-Bowes | 18 August 1998 |
Professor Craig drops a bombshell on the staff of Ward 17 - with dire consequences for Bronwyn and Luke's relationship.
| 28 | 28 | "Family Feud" | Peter Sharp | Sally Webb | 25 August 1998 |
Richard Craig is all set to perform ground breaking heart surgery, but when the patient changes his mind, Richard places the blame on Bronwyn.
| 29 | 29 | "Little White Lies" | Geoff Cawthorn | Carol Williams & Andy Ryan | 1 September 1998 |
Stephanie is placed in an ethical dilemma when she is forced to lie. Jared fears he may have contracted HIV while giving First-Aid to a dying drug addict.
| 30 | 30 | "Best Laid Plans" | Robert Klenner | David Phillips | 8 September 1998 |
Terri fills in as Assistant Director of Nursing for the day, leaving Stephanie in charge of Ward 17. Richard forces Bronwyn into making a huge sacrifice.
| 31 | 31 | "Parting Friends" | Catherine Roden | Chris Hawkshaw | 15 September 1998 |
Bronwyn faces crisis upon crises as she hands in her resignation and her dear friend's life-saving operation goes terribly wrong.
| 32 | 32 | "Cards on the Table" | Scott Feeney | Grant Fraser | 22 September 1998 |
A patient's flirtation with Jared becomes serious when she accuses him of rape. A patient's honesty and optimism gives Stephanie the strength to tell Ben she may never want children.
| 33 | 33 | "Boys Will Be Boys" | Geoff Cawthorn | David Phillips | 29 September 1998 |
Bronwyn is looking for action on her first day of ambulance duty - and she gets more than she bargained for.
| 34 | 34 | "Live Now, Pay Later" | Robert Klenner | Michaeley O'Brien | 29 September 1998 |
Stephanie and Luke work together to solve a medical mystery but with devastating consequences. Terri has to deal with a nudist on the ward. Bronwyn realises Ben has post traumatic stress syndrome.
| 35 | 35 | "Out of Control" | Catherine Roden | Grant McAloon & Annette Moore | 6 October 1998 |
Terri is placed in mortal danger by the husband of a patient who has been the victim of domestic violence. Jaz tries to come to terms with the fact she was date-raped by Danny.
| 36 | 36 | "Mirror, Mirror on the Wall" | Scott Feeney | Louise Crane-Bowes | 13 October 1998 |
Ward 17 reels from the consequences when they learn about Jaz's ordeal. Ben discovers an elderly patient who isn't at all what she appears to be.
| 37 | 37 | "The Price of Love" | Mark Piper | Alexa Wyatt | 20 October 1998 |
Stephanie faces a moral dilemma when she suspects an old friend of performing euthanasia on her dying husband. Peter is troubled by thoughts of who received his late wife's organs.
| 38 | 38 | "Happy Death Day" | Grant Brown | Charlie Strachan | 27 October 1998 |
Terri is forced to nurse a patient who is determined to commit suicide - he is admitted with a drug overdose as well as legal papers to say he is not to be resuscitated.
| 39 | 39 | "Moment of Truth" | Peter Fisk | Anne Lucas | 3 November 1998 |
Stephanie's life is on the line when she and two patients contract a rare disease. Luke is forced to question his abilities as a doctor when faced with an ungrateful patient.
| 40 | 40 | "Hard Rain" | Scott Feeney | Marcia Gardner | 10 November 1998 |
Ben and Bronwyn are called to save a little girl who has fallen down a storm water drain. Terri reveals another side to her nature when a patient pushes her too far.
| 41 | 41 | "Christmas Spice" | Mark Piper | Margaret Wilson | 17 November 1998 |
As Ward 17 celebrates Christmas, a sick child hopes that her wish will come true, an elderly man asks Santa for a special gift for his ailing wife, and Bronwyn is in for a surprise.

== DVD release ==
The Complete First Season
| Set Details | Special Features |
| 41 Episodes (1811 Mins.); Episodes 1 - 41; 10-Disc Set; 1:33:1 Fullscreen Aspect Ratio; English (Dolby Digital 2.0 Stereo); Distributed by EMI; Rated M; All Region Compatible | Slipcase Packaging |
| Release Dates | Slipcase Packaging |
| Australia | Slipcase Packaging |
| 28 November 2005 | Slipcase Packaging |
