= Norman Brennan =

British police officer

Norman Brennan is a British campaigner on issues of policing and law and order. He was a police officer in the British Transport Police, based in London, England, and left the police in 2009 after 31 years.

== Career ==
During his law enforcement career, Brennan stated he was assaulted on multiple occasions and decided he did not want any colleague to go through the types of assault and consequences that he had. He therefore launched a campaign group called "Protect the Protectors", calling for better protection for police officers.

He became a regular contributor to the media on police issues.

He also set up Victims of Crime Trust registered as a charity in 1994, which gave a voice for victims of crime and specialised in helping families bereaved through murder or manslaughter. The trust failed to submit returns to the Charity Commission from 2005 onwards, and its registration was removed in 2010 on the grounds that it had "ceased to exist".

== Reactions to his work ==
Police Review described Brennan as probably being the best known face and voice in British policing and said that "Protect the Protectors" was the primary reason the government of the day reversed its policy on issuing police officers with a side-handled baton which had been originally refused.

Some members of the Police Federation, the Association of Chief Police Officers (ACPO) and the Home Office were critical of Brennan's outspoken positions. One Police Federation member was quoted as saying that Brennan "gives outrageous soundbites and simplistic solutions to complex issues. I don't think he represents the views of many officers."

In 2013, The Independent offered critical coverage questioning whether Brennan is a convenient "rent-a-mouth" for the media pointing out his propensity to comment on a wide array of matters unrelated to policing, ranging from asylum-seekers to prison gyms. The newspaper also suggested that some in the police force viewed Brennan as "an unelected, unrepresentative, hardline reactionary."
