= Victims of Crime Trust =

Former English charity

The Victims of Crime Trust was an English charity which aimed at providing care assistance to victims of serious crime, as well as raising awareness of the issues that are faced by victims of crime in the aftermath of the crime.

It was founded in 1994, and from 1996 was extensively involved in support for families of murder and manslaughter victims.

Its founder and director was Norman Brennan, a former police officer.

Its accounts and Annual Returns which should have been sent to the Charity Commission were several years overdue in July 2010 and its website withdrawn from service.

The Charity Commission removed the trust's registration on 9 December 2010 on the grounds that it had "ceased to exist".
