= 2014 Colchester murders =

Serial killings of two people in Colchester, United Kingdom

James Fairweather
- Born: 5 August 1998 (age 28)
- Occupation: Schoolboy
- Status: Found guilty
- Motive: Psychosis (claimed, rejected by court)
- Conviction: Murder (2 counts)
- Criminal charges: Two charges of murder
- Penalty: Life imprisonment with minimum term of 27 years

Details
- Victims: James Attfield; Nahid Almanea
- Date: 29 March and 17 June 2014
- Locations: Castle Park and Salary Brook Trail, Colchester, Essex
- Target: Random
- Killed: Two
- Weapon: Knife
- Date apprehended: 27 May 2015

On 29 March 2014, 33-year-old James Attfield, who had a brain injury, was stabbed to death in Colchester, Essex. Three months later, on 17 June, Nahid Almanea, a 31-year-old Saudi student of the University of Essex, was also stabbed and killed. Teenager James Fairweather was apprehended while planning a third murder in May 2015, and in January 2016 he pleaded responsible for both deaths. In April 2016, he was found guilty of both murders and sentenced to life imprisonment with a minimum term of 27 years.

== Perpetrator ==
James Fairweather was 15 years old when he committed his murders, and 17 at his conviction. He attended Colchester Academy. He was bullied for his prominent ears. He struggled at school, in part due to dyslexia, which was not diagnosed until he was detained. In 2012, he was badly affected by the death of his grandmother.

Fairweather was convicted of knifepoint robbery of cigars in January 2014, and sentenced to a year's supervision. He was also convicted of criminal damage of a house in 2013.

== Murders ==
Attfield was a father of five who 'had suffered a head injury after a car crash a few years before he was killed.' He was lying on the grass at Castle Park after drinking, when he was attacked by Fairweather. He was found bleeding to death by paramedics, who could not save his life. The violence committed towards him with over a hundred stab wounds startled the police, and the BBC decided that the details were too "gruesome to describe". In court, Fairweather said that voices had chosen Attfield to be his victim, and the voices began to laugh as he stabbed him. Attfield had defensive wounds on his arms and hands, indicating that he was conscious enough to attempt to fight off Fairweather.

Almanea was killed in overgrowth on Salary Brook Trail near her home. Fairweather stabbed her in the abdomen before forcing the knife into her eyes and ultimately her brain, so that she could not "see evil".

== Legal proceedings ==
=== Initial investigation ===
Essex Police questioned 70 locals with a history of knife crime, including Fairweather, who gave an alibi and was not questioned further.

As of January 2015, more than 900 potential witnesses had been interviewed. Nine people from various towns in East Anglia were arrested and bailed by officers investigating Attfield's murder. Det Supt Hawkings, Head of Major Crimes for Essex Police called the attack "brazen" for occurring in a public space where passersby were likely. Police said that despite no firm evidence, one line of enquiry in the murder of Almanea was a possible hate crime. During the trial, by which time it was known that Almanea and Attfield were killed by the same person, it was announced that both had been selected randomly. Premature assumptions that it was a hate crime led the Islamic State of Iraq and the Levant (ISIL) to threaten revenge attacks, using the Twitter hashtag #Colchester.

The fact that Almanea and Attfield were unconnected people, and had been killed at different times of the day, led to a line of investigation that there could have been two separate killers. Fewer people went out in Colchester in public, and overgrowth was cleared to remove hiding places.

=== Arrest and investigation of Fairweather ===
Fairweather did not attempt another murder for almost a year because the public were wary of the danger: on 27 May 2015 he was spotted loitering early in the morning by a concerned dogwalker. The police were called and interviewed Fairweather, who was wearing rubber-gripped gloves and bearing a knife. He was arrested. In August 2015, he told a psychiatrist some of the "most anti-social and violent thoughts" the professional had heard, saying that voices were telling him to burn babies and maim prostitutes. Searches of Fairweather's possessions included documentaries about serial killers such as the Yorkshire Ripper, but prosecutor Paul Scothern clarified that not all people with such interests are intent on imitating the killers.

=== Trial and sentencing ===
At the Old Bailey, the following January, his name not disclosed to the public for reasons of age, he denied two charges of murder and possessing an illegal weapon, but admitted to two charges of manslaughter on the grounds of diminished responsibility. Fairweather claimed to have psychosis, which was not found by a court psychiatrist. Fairweather was found unanimously guilty by the jury on 22 April 2016, and was to be sentenced a week later, with Judge Robin Spencer, QC, saying that the minimum sentence would be 12 years.

After the conviction, Attfield's mother Julie decried Fairweather as a "monster", condemning his cruelty to her son.

On 29 April 2016, Fairweather was sentenced to life imprisonment with a minimum of 27 years. Fairweather tried to appeal the sentence in September on the grounds of his age, but this was rejected as it was deemed that the judge was aware of both his age and the abnormality of his mental function.

== Documentaries ==
The murders were the subject of an episode of Teens Who Kill on CBS Reality in March 2017. It was covered in October 2017 on an episode of Jo Frost on Britain's Killer Kids. In May 2019, the case was covered by Britain's Deadliest Kids on Quest Red, with interviews from relatives, lawyers, the police, councillors and journalists. On 4 July 2022, the case was the subject of an episode of The Real Manhunter on the Sky Crime channel.
