= William Gardiner (English composer) =

English composer

William Gardiner (15 March 1770, in Leicester – 16 November 1853) was an English composer who is best known for his hymns. He published two collections of his works: Sacred Melodies (1808) and Music and Friends (1838). Gardiner's promotion of Ludwig van Beethoven led to the first performances of Beethoven's music in England in 1794.

In his Music and Friends, Gardiner told the story of how the first work of Beethoven became known in Britain after arriving in a violin case of a priest fleeing the French Revolutionary army.

== Vegetarianism ==
Gardiner was a teetotaller and vegetarian. He lived on a milk and vegetable diet for several years but gave it up after a life-changing experience. Gardiner stated that on one occasion he was dining with a "Mr. Brooke" an eccentric who placed a beef-steak on the table. He was offended that Gardiner refused to eat meat. Mr. Brooke put a horse pistol to Gardiner's head and declared he would shoot him if he did not eat the beef-steak. After this experience Gardiner gave up his vegetarian diet and resumed his former mode of living.

== Selected publications ==
- Music and Friends (3 volumes, 1838-1853)
- The Music of Nature (1849)
