= Random Walk =

1988 novel by Lawrence Block

Cover art for the first edition, which Block has described as "lame" and "science-fictiony".(sic)

Random Walk is a 1988 novel by Lawrence Block. It was first published by Tor Books.

== Synopsis ==
One day, Guthrie Wagner hears a voice telling him to abandon his life and go for a walk. He does so, and is soon joined by other similarly-inspired "walkers", who all begin to develop superpowers and experience miracles.

== Reception ==
Critical reception of Random Walk was poor. Publishers Weekly considered it a "tiresome journey" for anyone not interested in New Age philosophy, with "no surprises", and stated that Block should have "channeled his positive energy elsewhere". Kirkus Reviews declared it to be "naive, preachy, and dull", and "psychospiritual babble", with the only suspense being several vignettes about a serial killer who eventually joins the walkers. At the New York Times, Marilyn Stasio similarly felt that the text was improved by the serial killer, whose presence she found reminiscent of Block's earlier works, but ultimately judged the conclusion as "too elusive to sustain the narrative". AudioFile, reviewing the 2003 audiobook version, was even blunter, calling the book "truly dopey", with "mawkishness (of) insufferable proportions".

== Origins ==
Block has described the writing of Random Walk as "the most extraordinary writing experience (he) ever had": one day in 1987, he thought of the central image of a man literally walking away from his life, and found it interesting; he then thought about it in greater detail for three days while driving from his Florida home to the Virginia Center for the Creative Arts. There, he wrote the entire novel without even having made an outline, "twenty pages a day for three weeks and a day".
