= Rowan of Rin (novel) =

Novel by Jennifer Rowe

- Author: Emily Rodda
- Illustrator: Matt Wilson
- Language: English
- Series: Rowan of Rin
- Release number: 1st in series
- Genre: Fantasy novel
- Publisher: Omnibus Books / Scholastic Australia
- Publication date: 1993 (first released)
- Publication place: Australia
- Media type: Print (hardback & paperback); Audiobook
- Pages: 138
- ISBN: 1-86291-182-7
- Followed by: Rowan and the Travellers

Rowan of Rin is a children's fantasy novel by Australian author Emily Rodda. It is the first in the five-book series of the same name. It was first published in 1993 and re-released in 2003 with the fifth and final novel in the series: Rowan of the Bukshah. In 1994, the novel won the Children's Book of the Year Award for Younger Readers.

The Rowan of Rin series takes place in the same universe and on the same world as Emily Rodda's Deltora Quest book series, a fantasy universe popularly referred to as the Roddaverse by fans.

== Plot summary ==
One morning the people of Rin wake up to find that the stream that flows down from the mountain has slowed to a trickle. By nightfall, it dries up completely; the villagers are alarmed and distressed by this unprecedented crisis. The stream is essential for the survival of the bukshah, the herd of animals that plow the land and are rich sources of wool and milk, and hence also for the survival of the people of Rin. Because of the severity of the situation, six of the strongest, bravest villagers decide to climb the mountain - considered forbidden territory, with tales telling of a dragon living at its peak - in order to see what is wrong at the source of the stream. Strong Jonn of the Orchard, Bronden the furniture-maker, Marlie the weaver, Allun the baker, and Val and Ellis, the twin millers, volunteer to make the perilous journey. When it turns out that Rowan, the village weakling, has been given a map of the mountain that only reveals the path when he is holding it, the group reluctantly agree that Rowan must join them.

During the journey, the group must unravel riddles and persevere despite frightening situations to progress. One by one, each of the villagers breaks down and returns to the village when forced to confront their own greatest fears. Rowan, the most fearful of them all, proves to be the bravest after facing and overcoming each threat despite his fear. Having reached the dragon's lair at the top of the mountain, Rowan is able to remove a bone stuck in the dragon's throat, enabling it to breathe fire again and melt the ice in and around its lair. The melted ice rushes down a channel inside the mountain and becomes the stream that runs down to the village of Rin, carrying the remaining villagers back home with it.

== Awards ==
List of accolades awarded to Rowan of Rin:

- 1994 Children's Book of the Year Award: Younger Readers
- 1994 YABBA Award - Older Readers
- 1996 IBBY Honour Book
- 1999 Dymocks Children's Choice Award - Favourite Australian Younger Reader Book and Author

== Rowan of Rin series ==
The other books in the Rowan of Rin series are:

1. Rowan of Rin
2. Rowan and the Travellers
3. Rowan and the Keeper of the Crystal
4. Rowan and the Zebak
5. Rowan of the Bukshah
