= List of Murder Call episodes =

The following is a list of episodes for the Australian television programme Murder Call (1997–2000), originally based on the novels of Jennifer Rowe.

The episodes were produced over two production seasons, however the network chose to split them into three televised seasons. When the series was cancelled, the final 9 episodes of the third season were held back and ultimately aired after a yearlong hiatus.

The entire series was released on DVD in 2019. It is currently available for streaming on 7plus, with episodes arranged in production order rather than broadcast order.

== Series overview ==
Season	Episodes	Originally aired		Network
Season	Episodes	Season premiere	Season finale	Network
1	16	11 August 1997	23 November 1997	Nine Network
2	20	7 July 1998	24 November 1998	Nine Network
3	20	21 April 1999	9 October 2000	Nine Network

== Episodes ==
=== Series 1 (1997) ===
No. overall	No. in series	Title	Directed by	Written by	Original release date	Prod. code
1	1	"Ashes to Ashes"	Geoffrey Cawthorn	Rick Maier (story by Jennifer Rowe)	11 August 1997	1.05
An early morning surfer gets more than he bargained for when he comes across a floating corpse. When unorthodox Detective Tessa Vance's (Lucy Bell) ex-boyfriend is murdered, she soon finds her own life in danger. Guest stars: Ian Bliss, Penne Hackforth-Jones
2	2	"The Burial"	Mark Piper	David Phillips (story by Jennifer Rowe)	18 August 1997	1.03
When a dead man is found buried up to his neck at the beach, Tessa and her partner, no-nonsense Detective Steve Hayden (Peter Mochrie) investigate if his death was a stupid party prank gone wrong or something more sinister.
3	3	"Cat and Mouse"	Richard Jasek	Catherine Stryckland (story by Jennifer Rowe)	25 August 1997	1.02
Steve and Tessa must track a serial killer who meets his victims through the internet, a task made more complicated when one of the victims has a personal connection to the team's investigating constable, Dee Suzeraine (Jennifer Kent).
4	4	"Dead Clean"	Ian Watson	Ted Roberts (story by Jennifer Rowe)	1 September 1997	1.06
While investigating a series of bizarre murders, Steve and Tessa are drawn to the local community centre, a drop in for ex-mental patients. With a handful of suspects, but no real clues, Steve and Tessa must race against the clock to find the killer before he strikes again.
5	5	"Who Killed Cock Robin? [streaming title: Who Killed Robin Cochrane?]"	Chris Martin-Jones	Shelley Birse (story by Jennifer Rowe)	8 September 1997	1.01
To the outside world Robin Cochrane was a picture of charm, but when he is found poisoned by a chemical solvent Tessa and Steve are forced to put together a picture of the not so pleasant, private Robin Cochrane. Guest star: Jessica Napier
6	6	"Hot Shot"	Richard Sarell	Kristen Dunphy (story by Jennifer Rowe)	15 September 1997	1.07
When Maddie Herman, a paparazzi photographer who made her living out of the gossip and innuendo of the lives of others, is found murdered, Steve and Tessa have a wide pool of suspects. Guest stars: Melissa George, Nicolle Dickson
7	7	"Black Friday"	Richard Sarell	David Phillips (story by Jennifer Rowe)	22 September 1997	1.11
Steve and Tessa are called in to solve the murder of Trevor Parkin, found dead in a gorilla suit at a local zoo.
8	8	"Last Stop"	Richard Jasek	Denise Morgan (story by Jennifer Rowe)	29 September 1997	1.13
A model train enthusiast is found dead in a model neighbourhood, seemingly poisoned by cyanide.
9	9	"Something Wicked"	Geoffrey Cawthorn	Denise Morgan (story by Jennifer Rowe)	6 October 1997	1.04
Tessa and Steve are confronted with a conspiracy of silence when they are investigating the death of a man with a history of abuse.
10	10	"Drop Dead Gorgeous"	Ian Watson	Chris Hawkshaw (story by Jennifer Rowe)	13 October 1997	1.09
Steve and Tessa are baffled when a footballer is stabbed to death in a lift and a missing woman's handbag is found next to the body.
11	11	"Dead and Gone"	Mark Piper	Daniel Krige (story by Jennifer Rowe)	20 October 1997	1.08
When Krystyan Balzan is found dead at the bottom of the stairs in his house, Steve and Tessa believe he came home unexpectedly and disturbed a robbery in progress. They are disturbed when the team's Forensics expert, Lance Fisk (Geoff Morrell) has a connection to the case.
12	12	"Wages of Sin"	Geoffrey Cawthorn	Sally Webb (story by Jennifer Rowe)	27 October 1997	1.10
Steve and Tessa investigate the death of a woman found in an area notorious for prostitutes. When they learn the woman was a pregnant nun and not a prostitute, their investigation takes a new turn.
13	13	"An Eye for an Eye"	Julian McSwiney	Andrew Kelly (story by Jennifer Rowe)	3 November 1997	1.12
When a mummified body is found in an empty house, it is identified as that of a woman who went missing two years earlier. Revelations from their quirky autopsy doctor "Tootsie" Soames (Glenda Linscott) force Steve and Tessa to reopen a case that was supposedly solved by their own superior, Detective Inspector Thorne (Gary Day).
14	14	"Blood Heat"	Grant Brown	Rick Maier (story by Jennifer Rowe)	10 November 1997	1.20
A video store owner who has been opposed by a group of conservative residents for his violent and sexual products is brutally murdered.
15	15	"Fall from Grace"	Geoffrey Cawthorn	Christine McCourt and Denise Morgan (story by Jennifer Rowe)	17 November 1997	1.14
Tessa suspects an apparent suicide is really an elaborate scam designed to cover a woman's disappearance.
16	16	"Heartstopper"	Grant Brown	Cathryn Strickland (story by Jennifer Rowe)	23 November 1997	1.22
"When the general manager of a department store is found dead during the store's opening, the owner and employees are the main suspects. Steve is haunted by a face from the past, and Tessa pursues the case alone."

=== Series 2 (1998) ===
No. overall	No. in series	Title	Directed by	Written by	Original release date	Prod. code
17	1	"Dared to Death"	Grant Brown	Andrew Kelly	7 July 1998	2.12
When a professional stuntman is found dead, hanging in a harness outside the window of his apartment, Steve and Tessa must determine whether it was an accident, suicide or murder. Guest Stars: Helen Thomson, Dee Smart
18	2	"Many Unhappy Returns"	Richard Jasek	Kristen Dunphy (story by Jennifer Rowe)	14 July 1998	2.01
Steve and Tessa rush to solve the crime of a man who is murdered on his 50th birthday. Guest Star: Kate Fitzpatrick
19	3	"Skin Deep"	Julian McSwiney	Chris Hawkshaw (story by Jennifer Rowe)	21 July 1998	1.19
When Dr. Theo Magnus, a leading cosmetic surgeon, is ambushed in his clinic and brutally murdered with a scalpel, his family and staff shed little light on the mystery.
20	4	"Fatal Charm"	Geoffrey Cawthorn	Chris Hawkshaw (story by Jennifer Rowe)	28 July 1998	2.09
Steve and Tessa investigate when the body of a young women is found, having been killed by a blow to the head before being set alight.
21	5	"Short Circuit"	Ian Watson	David Phillips (story by Jennifer Rowe)	4 August 1998	1.18
When a young woman is electrocuted by her twin brother's robot, the subsequent investigation leads Tessa and Steve to uncover a bizarre tangle of relationships. Guest Star: Anne Tenney
22	6	"Cold Comfort"	Geoffrey Cawthorn	Robyn Sinclair (story by Jennifer Rowe)	11 August 1998	2.16
The body of a beautiful woman, victim of hit-and-run accident, is taken to the morgue. Tootsie arrives shortly afterwards to find the body missing and her new assistant murdered. Guest Stars: Valerie Bader, John Batchelor, Roy Billing, Matt Boesenberg, Jo Briant, Andrew Crabbe, Greg Davis, Susan Hoerlein, Dean Nottle.
23	7	"Murder in Reverse"	Grant Brown	Kristen Dunphy	18 August 1998	2.05
When a woman's body is found in a local dump, Tessa and Steve's investigation uncovers a series of kidnappings. But are these kidnappings an elaborate ruse to disguise a murder?
24	8	"More Than Meets The Eye"	Julian McSwiney	Deborah Parsons (story by Jennifer Rowe)	25 August 1998	1.15
A gruesome discovery draws Steve and Tessa into a case that leads them into the dark stormwater tunnels of the city.
25	9	"Dead Fall"	Geoffrey Cawthorn	David Phillips	9 September 1998	2.04
Guest Stars: Gary Baxter, Graeme Blundell, Andrew Buchanan, Kelly Butler, Thom Clunie, Essie Davis, Tony Poli, Roxane Wilson, Greg Robinson.
26	10	"Deadline (Part 1)"	Richard Sarell	Andrew Kelly (story by Jennifer Rowe)	22 September 1998	1.23a
Guest Stars: Barry Otto, Malcolm Kennard, Sam Wilcox, Carole Skinner, Fiona Mahl, Emily Dawe, Damon Herriman, Nick Belomis, Sue Moses, Chris King, Rudi Baker, Todd Dwyer, Tahnee Stroet, Jan Merriman, Kelly Crauer, Richard O'Brien, Gabrielle Link, Greg Marchant, Anthony Hunt.
27	11	"Deadline (Part 2)"	Richard Sarell	Andrew Kelly (story by Jennifer Rowe)	22 September 1998	1.23b
Guest Stars: Barry Otto, Malcolm Kennard, Sam Wilcox, Carole Skinner, Fiona Mahl, Emily Dawe, Damon Herriman, Nick Belomis, Sue Moses, Chris King, Rudi Baker, Todd Dwyer, Tahnee Stroet, Jan Merriman, Kelly Crauer, Richard O'Brien, Gabrielle Link, Greg Marchant, Anthony Hunt.
28	12	"Something Fishy"	Ray Quint	Deborah Parsons	29 September 1998	2.11
Guest Stars: Elizabeth Alexander, Stephen Apps, Patrick Dickson, Suzzanne Eskine, Rhondda Findleton, Peter Melov, Mariette Rups-Donnelly.
29	13	"A Dress to Die For"	Grant Brown	Peter Gawler	6 October 1998	2.10
Guest Stars: Maggie Blinco, Ian Bolt, Steve Cox, Anthony Hayes, Brendan Higgins, Mark Hogan, Tony Sheldon, Peter Sumner, Jane Wilcox, Rick McClure.
30	14	"Menu for Murder"	Karl Steinberg	Sally Webb	13 October 1998	2.06
Guest Stars: Simon Burke, Deborah Galanos, Martin Jacobs, Kerry-Ella McAulay, Eszter Marrosszeky, Brian Meegan, Sean O'Shea, Brendon Packer.
31	15	"Cry Wolf"	Chris Martin-Jones	Denise Morgan (story by Jennifer Rowe)	20 October 1998	1.17
Guest Stars: Christine Stephen-Daly, Julie Herbert, Andrew McDonell, Will Usic, Neda Lucantonia, Joshua Rosenthal, Simon Elrahi, Zoe Georgakis, Gareth Gillahm.
32	16	"A View to Kill"	Richard Jasek	Louise Crane	27 October 1998	2.07
Guest Stars: Andrew Blaxland, Jason Clarke, Martin Dingle-Wall, Lewis Fitz-Gerald, Phillip Holland, Susie Lindeman, Tamblyn Lord, Susan Lyons, Brent Murphy, Vanessa Steele.
33	17	"Blowing the Whistle"	Ray Quint	Denise Morgan	3 November 1998	2.14
Guest Stars: Kerrie Erwin, Paul Gleeson, Sarah Kants, Ivar Kants, Lara Mulcahy, Anna Lise Phillips, Gail Watson.
34	18	"Instrument of Death"	Richard Sarell	Margaret Morgan	10 November 1998	2.13
Guest Stars: Ann Burbrook, Richard Cotter, Justin Monjo as Roland Lacey, Sarah Peirse, Keith Robinson, Andrew Siedlecki.
35	19	"Bone Dead"	Richard Jasek	Peter Gawler	17 November 1998	2.32
Guest Stars: Thuy Duong, Kate Fischer, John Gibson, Melissa Madden Gray, Errol R.J. Morrison, Leo Taylor, Eliza Mealey.
36	20	"Mix n Match"	Russell Burton	Denise Morgan	24 November 1998	2.28
Guest Stars: Betty Lucas, Joe James, Elspeth MacTavish, Christopher Pitman, Raechelle Lee, Nick Jones, Andrew Vial.

=== Series 3 (1999) ===
No. overall	No. in series	Title	Directed by	Written by	Original release date	Prod. code
37	1	"Dead Offerings"	Chris Martin-Jones	Deborah Parsons (story by Jennifer Rowe)	21 April 1999	2.25
38	2	"Evil Chances"	Paul Faint	Andrew Kelly (story by Jennifer Rowe)	28 April 1999	2.26
39	3	"Tongue Tied"	Chris Martin-Jones	Peter Gawler (story by Jennifer Rowe)	5 May 1999	2.21
40	4	"Dying Day"	Geoffrey Cawthorn	Rick Maier (story by Jennifer Rowe)	12 May 1999	1.16
41	5	"Death in the Family"	Chris Martin-Jones	Cathryn Stickland (story by Jennifer Rowe)	19 May 1999	1.21
42	6	"Death Down Market"	Karl Steinberg	Denise Morgan	2 June 1999	2.03
43	7	"A Blow to the Heart"	Karl Steinberg	Margaret Wilson	16 June 1999	2.08
44	8	"Bad Business"	Geoffrey Cawthorn	Louise Crane (story by Jennifer Rowe)	30 June 1999	2.02
45	9	"Hide & Seek"	Russell Burton	Chris McCourt (story by Jennifer Rowe)	14 July 1999	2.15
46	10	"Booming Business"	Julian McSwiney	Daniel Krige and Louise Crane (story by Jennifer Rowe)	28 July 1999	2.17
47	11	"Cut & Dried"	Ray Quint	Louise Crane (story by Jennifer Rowe)	4 August 1999	2.18
48	12	"A Stab in the Dark"	Julian McSwiney	David Phillips (story by Jennifer Rowe)	14 August 2000	2.19
49	13	"Paid in Full"	Julian McSwiney	Chris Hawkshaw (story by Jennifer Rowe)	28 August 2000	2.22
50	14	"Grave Matters"	Richard Sarell	Sally Webb	21 August 2000	2.20
51	15	"Last Act"	Steve Mann	Margaret Wilson (story by Jennifer Rowe)	4 September 2000	2.23
52	16	"Scent of Evil"	Steve Mann	Susan Hore	11 September 2000	2.24
53	17	"Still Life"	Karl Steinberg	David Phillips	18 September 2000	2.27
54	18	"Absent Friends"	Chris Martin-Jones	Katherine Thomson (story by Jennifer Rowe)	25 September 2000	2.29
55	19	"House of Spirits"	Grant Brown	Charlie Strachan	2 October 2000	2.30
56	20	"Done to Death"	Paul Faint	Deborah Parsons	9 October 2000	2.31
