= The Golden Door =

The Golden Door may refer to:

- Nuovomondo, a 2006 film about an Italian immigrant to the US, whose English title is Golden Door
- The Golden Door (play), a play by Toronto playwright Catherine Frid
- The Golden Door, the first book in The Three Doors book series
