= The Third Wish =

The Third Wish may refer to:

- The 3rd Wish: To Rock the World, a 1999 album by SPM
- Third Wish, a novel by Robert Fulghum
- The Third Wish (film), a 2005 film with Armand Assante and Betty White
- The Third Wish, a 2003 novel by Emily Rodda in the Fairy Realm series
