= Jim Holt (actor) =

Australian actor

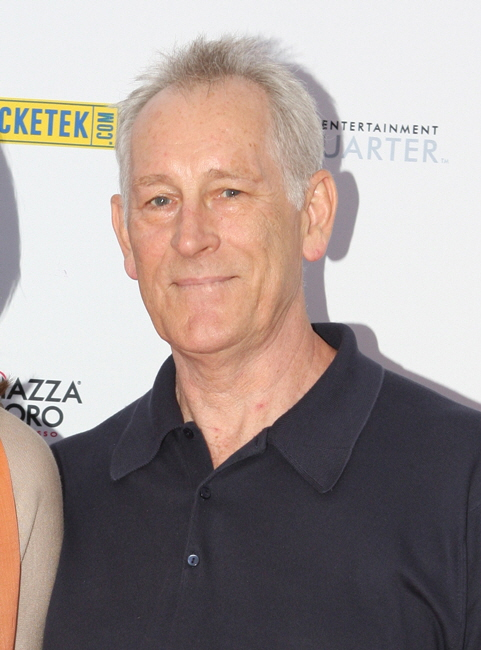
- Holt in January 2013
- Born: James David Holt; 15 January 1956 (age 70); Liverpool, England
- Occupation: Actor
- Years active: 1983–present
- Spouse: Robyn Jean Holt (m. 1985)

James David Holt (born 15 January 1956) is an English-born actor who has appeared in many Australian television shows and films.

Holt is also a magician, and has had the opportunity to incorporate this talent into some of his television appearances. Well known productions in which he has appeared include Bodyline, Anzacs, Crocodile Dundee II, A Country Practice, Embassy, G. P., Heartbreak High, Wildside, and most recently in an episode of Packed to the Rafters (2009).

He is married to publishing executive Robyn Holt, and they have a daughter named Hannah. From around 2002 to early 2006, he was based in Russia while his wife was the Managing Director of Condé Nast Zao.

== Filmography ==
=== Acting ===
Year	Film	Role	Notes
1981	The Young Doctors	Wayne Archer	TV soap
1983	Under Capricorn	William Winter	TV mini-series
1983	Who Killed Baby Azaria?	Detective Sergeant Charlwood	TV mini-series
1984	Bodyline	Harold Larwood	TV mini-series
1985	Stock Squad		TV
1985	Anzacs	Pte. Dinny "Dingo" Gordon	TV mini-series
1986	The Humpty Dumpty Man	Russell Wilkes	
1986	Five Times Dizzy		TV series
1986	Short Changed	Serizio	
1987	Captain James Cook	Lt. John Williamson	TV mini-series
1987	Twelfth Night	Valentine	Film
1987	Vietnam	Lt. Smart	TV mini-series
1987	Going Sane	Irwin Grant	
1987	The Time Guardian	Rafferty	
1988	Os Emissários de Khalom	Lord Costigan	Film (Portuguese)
1988	Crocodile Dundee II	Erskine	
1988	Fever	Morris	
1988	Evil Angels	John Eldridge	Film: released outside Australia and New Zealand as A Cry in the Dark. Based on the 1985 book Evil Angels.
1989	How Wonderful!	Lord Costigan	
1989	The Flying Doctors	Brian	TV series - 1 episode
1982–1990	A Country Practice	Kevin Carson (1982)/Cole Swetz(1983)/Dr Ian Parker (1988)/Sgt Bruce Sharp (1990)	TV series - 8 episodes
1990	Hey Dad..!	Brian Edwards	TV series - 1 episode
1991	Strangers	Graham	TV
1992	The Last Man Hanged	Journalist	TV
1992	Backsliding	Jack Tyson	
1991–1992	Embassy	James Peake	TV series - 4 episodes
1993–1994	G. P.	Justin Browning	TV series - 2 episodes
1995	Blue Murder	Brian Alexander	TV mini-series
1996	The Man from Snowy River	Noah Bates	TV series - 1 episode (released in the UK & US as Snowy River: The McGregor Saga)
1997	Big Sky	Mark Campbell	TV
1997	Diana & Me	Detective	
1997–1998	Heartbreak High	Tony Black	TV series - 4 episodes
1998	Children's Hospital	Duncan	TV series - 1 episode
1998–1999	Wildside	Sgt Graham Holbeck	TV series - 10 episodes
1999	Murder Call	Graham Hart	TV
2000	The Potato Factory	Harris	TV mini-series
2000	The Monkey's Mask	Bill McDonald	Film: aka Cercle intime (France), aka La maschera di scimmia (Italy), aka Poetry, Sex (Japan: English title)
2001	My Husband My Killer	Porter	TV
2002	Sway	Minister	
2002	Young Lions	David Brooks	TV series - 1 episode
2006	The Prince and Me 2: The Royal Wedding	Prince Albert	Straight-to-Video release
2009	Packed to the Rafters	Bill Tonks	TV series - 1 episode
