= Ian Bone (author) =

Australian writer

- Born: 1956 (age 69–70); Geelong, Victoria, Australia
- Occupation: Author
- Notable work: The Song of an Innocent Bystander

Ian Bone (born 1956) is an Australian writer, author and novelist.

== Biography ==
Born in Geelong, Victoria in 1956, Bone has authored over twenty-five books, which have been commended and shortlisted in numerous awards, including the NSW Premier's Award, the Ned Kelly Awards for crime fiction (twice) and the Family Awards for Children's Literature. He has nine titles that have been included in the Notable Books list by the Children's Book Council of Australia, including Sleep Rough Tonight, published in 2004. His novel The Song of an Innocent Bystander was shortlisted for the South Australian Festival Awards for Literature, the Children's Book Council Book of the Year Awards, was nominated for inclusion on the American Library Association's Best Books for Young Adults list, and is being adapted by a major Australian film director into a feature film.

He has also been working on children's television programs for ABC TV including Play School, Swap Shop, Couch Potato and Finders Keepers.

Ian's work is published in the United Kingdom, the United States, Germany and Korea. A graduate of the Australian Film and Television School, he has made many award-winning TV programs, and creates online educational programs and e-learning for tertiary students in his spare time. He is married with three children, and lives in Adelaide.

== Multimedia producer ==
Ian has also been working as multimedia producer creating online e-learning programs for a variety of clients, including the Digital media dept of the South Australian Women and Children's Hospital.

== Books ==
- Philomena Wonderpen is a Teeny Weeny Doll (Puffin Books, 2007)
- Philomena Wonderpen is a Very Naughty Teacher (Puffin Books, 2006)
- Love Cuts (Young Adult, Penguin Books, 2006)
- Sleep Rough Tonight (Young Adult, Penguin Books, 2004)
- The Song of an Innocent Bystander (Young Adult, Penguin Books Australia, 2002, Dutton USA 2004)
- Geständnis Einer Unschuldigen (German edition of 'The Song of an Innocent Bystander' – Ravensburger Buchverlag, 2002)
- That Dolphin Thing (Upper Primary & Secondary, Puffin, 2001)
- Ich Hab Dir Meer Versprochen (German edition of 'That Dolphin Thing' – Ravensburger Buchverlag, 2004)
- Tin Soldiers (Young Adult, Lothian Books, 2000)
- Spy Babies (Middle & Upper Primary, Lothian Books, 2000)
- Fat Boy Saves World (Young Adult, Lothian Books 1998)
- Scarlets Bat' (Puffin Books, 2004)
- A Dangerous Secret (Book No. 1 of 'Vidz' – Random House Australia & Delacorte Press USA, 2003)
- Time Trap (Book No. 2 of 'Vidz' – Random House Australia & Delacorte Press USA, 2003)
- The Quivering Spy (Book No. 3 of 'Vidz' – Random House Australia 2004)
- The X Factor (Book No. 4 of 'Vidz' – Random House Australia 2004)
- Winning Back Dad (Middle Primary Readers – Walker Books UK & Australia, 1999)
- Baby Days (Picture book – Omnibus Books)
- Dancing Night Tonight (Picture book – Scholastic Australia)

== Awards ==
- 2000 Australian Family Therapists' Award for Children's Literature — Older Readers, commended for Winning Back Dad
- 2003 Children's Book of the Year Award: Older Readers, shortlisted for The Song of an Innocent Bystander
- 2004 South Australian Literary Awards – Young Adult Division, shortlisted for The Song of an Innocent Bystander
- 2004 American Librarians Association's "Best Book for Young Adults" list, nominated for The Song of an Innocent Bystander
