= Nowhere to Run =

Nowhere to Run may refer to:

== Film and television ==
- Nowhere to Run (1989 film), an American film directed by Carl Franklin
- Nowhere to Run (1993 film), an American action film starring Jean-Claude Van Damme
- Nowhere to Run (1978 film), an American TV film starring David Janssen
- Nowhere to Run (2015 film), a Chinese film directed by Wang Mengyuan
- Nowhere to Run, a documentary film by Anthony Sherwood
- Nowhere to Run, a video compilation of episodes of Animorphs
- "Nowhere to Run" (Blue Heelers), a 1994 TV episode
- "Nowhere to Run" (Degrassi), a 2011 TV episode
- "Nowhere to Run" (Gunsmoke), a 1968 TV episode
- "Nowhere to Run" (Highlander: The Series), a 1993 TV episode
- "Nowhere to Run" (Instant Star), a 2007 TV episode
- "Nowhere to Run" (Quantum Leap), a 1992 TV episode
- 2048: Nowhere to Run, a 2017 short film set in the Blade Runner universe

== Music ==
=== Songs ===
- "Nowhere to Run" (song), by Martha and the Vandellas
- "Nowhere to Run", by The Crystal Method and others from the soundtrack album Chef Aid: The South Park Album
- "Nowhere to Run", by Fozzy
- "Nowhere to Run", by Girlschool from Running Wild
- "Nowhere to Run", by J. J. Cale from Naturally
- "Nowhere to Run", by Jon Oliva's Pain from 'Tage Mahal
- "Nowhere to Run", by Kiss from Killers
- "Nowhere to Run", by The Korgis from Sticky George
- "Nowhere to Run", by Lillix from Tigerlily
- "Nowhere to Run", by Pete Townshend and Ronnie Lane from Rough Mix
- "Nowhere to Run", by Santana from Shangó
- "No Where to Run", by King Gordy from King of Horrorcore

=== Albums ===
- Nowhere to Run, by 50 Lions
- Nowhere to Run, by Agression
- Nowhere to Run, by Chron Gen
- Nowhere to Run, by Ted Hawkins

== Other media ==
- Nowhere to Run, a Hardy Boys Casefiles novel
- Nowhere to Run, a novel in the Teen Power Inc. series
- Nowhere to Run, the first novel in Series Three (Unstoppable) of The 39 Clues
- Spy Hunter: Nowhere to Run (video game), a 2006 racing game

== See also ==
- "Nowhere to Run, Nowhere to Hide", song by Gravediggaz, interpolating the Martha and the Vandellas song
