= Golden Door =

Golden Door may refer to:

- America's Golden Door, a nickname for Jersey City
- Ellis Island, the "golden door" through which many immigrants to the USA have passed
- Golden Door Film Festival
- The New Colossus, a poem which ends with the phrase
- Nuovomondo, a 2006 film known in English as "Golden Door"
- The Golden Door, the first book in The Three Doors book series
