= Finders Keepers (Australian TV series) =

- Genre: Children's; Science fiction
- Created by: Emily Rodda
- Directed by: Scott Hicks; Andrew Ellis; Peter Lindon
- Starring: Jeremy Schwerdt; Paul Tresnan; Jethro Heyson-Hicks; Grant Piro; Jackie Kerin; Joey Kennedy; Penny Macgraith; Patrick Frost; Sam Prest
- Music by: The Circular Sound
- Country of origin: Australia
- No. of seasons: 2
- No. of episodes: 10

Production
- Executive producer: Margot Phillipson
- Producer: Ian Bone
- Running time: 20 minutes

Original release
- Network: ABC TV
- Release: 28 October 1991 – 13 December 1992

Finders Keepers, also known as The Finder, is an Australian children's television series, directed by Scott Hicks, that first aired on 28 October 1991, based on a book by Emily Rodda. The story revolves around a boy called Patrick who, whilst playing on a computer, receives an invitation to take part on a TV game show called "Finders Keepers" through a store in a shopping arcade. He accepts the invitation and is sucked into another world where he is given clues to find missing treasures from his own world and take part in an interdimensional hunt.

The show aired on ABC TV and covered the book in two seasons, each consisting of five episodes.

== Cast ==
=== Main cast ===
- Jeremy Schwerdt as Patrick
- Grant Piro as Max
- Paul Tresnan as Lucky
- Sam Prest as The Time Keeper
- Joey Kennedy as Estelle
- Kate Smith as Claire
- Caroline Winnall as Carol
- Jacki Kerin as Boopie
- Penny Maegraith as Mum
- Patrick Frost as Dad

=== Recurring cast ===
- Tony Mack as McCready
- Geoff Revell as Parsons
- John Crouch as Ross
- Annese as Glide
- Jethro Heysen-Hicks as Danny
- Hannah Birdsey as Wendy Melini
- Judy Dick as Eleanor Doon
- Celine O'Leary as Anna Varga
- Graham Duckett as Clyde O'Brien
- Scott Withers as Ted
- Scott Ellery as Bad Guard
- Dorinda Hafner as Ruby

=== Minor cast ===
- Michael Habib as Taxi Driver
- Allan Lyne as TV Shop Man
- Oriana Panozzo as Gift Shop Owner
- Dylan Wells as Boy on the Bus 1
- Karen Lawrence as Margret
- Richard Mulhullen as Boy on the Bus 2
- Gary George as Computer Shop Owner
- !Matthew Randell as Stage Hand

== Episodes ==
=== The Invitation ===
Episode 1.1

Patrick loves computers. One day, whilst he is playing a computer game, he is invited to play in the million-dollar game of Finders Keepers. No one will believe that the game exists, as it is on Channel 8 and there is no such station in Patrick's city. Patrick keeps hearing about the game until the time comes for him to play. He is almost foiled but eventually he crosses the time barrier via a TV set and begins the Finders Keepers game.

=== The Search ===
Episode 1.2

Patrick is given the task of finding a missing object that has been lost on his side of the barrier. Armed with only a clue and a beeper brooch (that beeps if he is near the object) he is sent back to his own world. He searches the zoo and the shopping centre where the brooch goes off at a gift shop. There are a few twists and turns until Patrick finally crosses the time barrier again with his "find".

=== The Barrier ===
Episode 1.3

Patrick agrees to play on in Finders Keepers. He is about to be transported back when the system breaks down, leaving him temporarily stuck on the other side. Wendy takes him to see the time barrier (the people on the other side can actually see and touch the time barrier, the audience cannot). Patrick sees objects pass through the barrier and also learns about the effects of TBE. When Patrick returns to the TV station the system breaks down even further. He is afraid he will never get home.

=== The Visitor ===
Episode 1.4

Patrick is finally sent back home only to find that Eleanor Doon's clue leads him to Estelle's ring. Patrick is torn by the dilemma of either taking Estelle's ring or missing out on winning a computer. As he debates with himself over what to do he begins to learn the truth about Estelle. He finally crosses over for the third time.

=== The Return ===
Episode 1.5

Estelle is reunited with Boopie and Patrick returns the find to Eleanor Doon, thus winning his computer. Unfortunately the system breaks down again, this time badly. Max is able to return Patrick home but without his computer. Patrick says good bye to his new friends and returns to his own side of the barrier. A few days later he receives an intriguing "present".

=== The Clock ===
Episode 2.1

Patrick finds an urgent message on his computer from Max—he needs Patrick's help. Patrick makes his way to the TV shop to be transported across the time barrier, leaving his cousin Carol at the clock. She discovers a strange ball and when she goes to tell Patrick about it she sees him transported into the barrier. Carol runs to the spot where Patrick went and she too is transported. Things are bad on the other side, there could be disaster. Carol is left stranded on the other side of the barrier, lost in a hostile environment. Max prepares to send Patrick back to find the clockmaker and fix the clock but just as Max is about to send him home agents burst in and arrest him.

=== The Ball ===
Episode 2.2

Patrick makes it through to the shopping centre only to find that time has passed and the clock has been taken away. He runs into a distraught Claire who has been looking for Carol. Patrick realises that Carol must have followed him to the other side and they rush home to contact Max, who is being interrogated by the agents. They let Max go but lock his room—he cannot get to his computer. Carol has her own encounter with some agents who try to take her ball away—it displays magic qualities and burns one of the agent's hands. Patrick, with the help of Claire, tracks the clock down to a warehouse. Carol is left to be confronted by Parsons, a senior agent.

=== The Clock Maker ===
Episode 2.3

Carol eludes the agents yet again and makes her way to be next to the barrier. This affects the barrier and causes a serious outbreak of time stream. Patrick and Claire find a poem on the clock that helps them locate the clockmaker, Anna Varga. She is sick in hospital and Patrick goes to find her. The time stream has travelled from the barrier into the TV stations where it knocks down a wall. Max works out a way to get back into his room. Patrick finds Anna Varga and tells her that the clock has been moved. She must get to the clock immediately. Carol will not move from the barrier as night falls. Parsons decides to fire a mend gun at Carol and push her into the barrier.

=== The Regulator ===
Episode 2.4

McCready, the senior agent, stops Parsons and Carol is saved. Max makes a device to affect Lucky so he can get back into his room. Patrick arrives at the clock with Anna Varga and she does a temporary repair on its crystal mechanism. The regulator is missing on the clock. Max contacts Patrick and learns from Anna Varga that she is linked to the clock in some way. McCready wants Max arrested again. He is sure that Max is somehow connected to this girl and her strange ball. Estelle sees Carol at the barrier and tries to bring her down but Parsons interferes and Carol runs into the barrier with fright. Patrick goes into the barrier after Carol and the program ends as he searches for her.

=== The Time Keeper ===
Episode 2.5

Patrick locates Carol but he loses the transport device. They are lost in the barrier. Max is thrown into isolation but not before he tells McCready all about the time keeper clock and the missing regulator. Claire helps Anna Varga move the clock back to the shopping centre. Meanwhile, McCready, who knows there are two children stuck in the barrier, has doubts, maybe Max is right. He goes to Max's room to move Patrick and Carol out, and is confronted by Estelle. Max arrives and he, with the help of Anna Varga, moves Patrick and Carol to the shopping centre. The regulator is replaced in the time keeper and the clock returns to normal. Claire gets Patrick and Carol home minutes before mum and dad return.

== Filming locations ==
Most of the shopping centre scenes were filmed at Northpark Shopping Centre in Prospect, Adelaide, South Australia, which has been heavily renovated since the airing of the show. Some scenes were filmed at Sefton Plaza directly across the road which remains largely unchanged. The show simply pretends both shopping centres are the same place. Other locations include Botanic Park (directly outside of the Adelaide Zoo) and the Dry Creek salt pans (north of Adelaide).

== See also ==
- South Australian Film Corporation
