= Grim Pickings =

- Genre: Murder mystery
- Based on: Grim Pickings by Jennifer Rowe
- Written by: Graeme Koetsveld
- Directed by: Ricardo Pellizzeri
- Starring: Lorraine Bayly; Liddy Clark; Max Cullen; Brian Vriends; Catherine Wilkin
- Country of origin: Australia
- Original language: English
- No. of episodes: 2 x 2 hours

Production
- Producer: Damien Parer
- Cinematography: Roger Dowling
- Running time: 183 minutes

Original release
- Network: Nine Network
- Release: 15 November – 16 November 1989

Grim Pickings is a 1989 Australian television miniseries. The miniseries was adapted from the 1987 Jennifer Rowe novel of the same name, the first in her Verity Birdwood series of murder mysteries.

== Cast ==
- Lorraine Bayly as Betsy Tender
- Liddy Clark as Verity Birdwood
- Max Cullen as Inspector Toby
- Catherine Wilkin as Kate
- Neil Fitzpatrick as Wilf Tender
- Rosey Jones as Susie
- David Cameron as Jeremy
- Eva Hamburg as Anna
- Phyllis Burford as Aunt Alice
- Helen O'Connor as Jill
- Stuart McCreery as Nick
- Scott Higgins as Chris
- Lynda Gibson as Theresa Sullivan
- Tony Harvey as Detective Constable McClinchy
- Brian Vriends as Damian Treloar
- Caroline Winnall as Zoe

== Plot ==
Every winter, the Tender family make a pilgrimage to the orchard of elderly Aunt Alice (Phyllis Burford) for the apple harvest. On the first day of the harvest, various family tensions emerge among the 13 adults, largely centred around family matriarch Betsy Tender (Lorraine Bayly), who has a desire to control and manipulate all around her. Dinner is interrupted by the arrival of Damian Treloar (Brian Vriends), the recently divorced ex-husband of Betsy's daughter Anna (Eva Hamburg). Treloar is disliked by almost every member of the group, and ultimately spends the night in his van outside the house. The next morning he is found dead in the orchard, wearing Betsy's parka, next to several half-eaten apples that appear to have been deliberately sprayed with pesticide.

Wily and unorthodox Inspector Toby (Max Cullen) and his bewildered new assistant Detective Constable McClinchy (Tony Harvey) arrive to investigate. The suspects include Anna; Aunt Alice; Betsy; her meek husband Wilf (Neil Fitzpatrick); their loyal son Chris (Scott Higgins) and his wife, nurse Susie (Rosey Jones), who feels oppressed by the family; Chris' longtime friend Nick, a jealous academic specialising in psychology (Stuart McCreery) and his de facto partner, Jill (Helen O'Connor), an editor who was recently working on a book with Damian; and a single mother who lives across the street, Theresa (Lynda Gibson). Also in attendance are another couple who are friends of the family, Kate (Catherine Wilkin) and Jeremy (David Cameron) and their young daughter Zoe (Caroline Winnall). This year, Kate has brought her friend - eccentric freelance researcher Verity Birdwood (Liddy Clark).

An outsider with limited people skills but a keen eye, Verity begins to suspect the death is not what it seems when she learns that the elderly Aunt Alice - whom most people think is going senile – is adamant that she didn't spray the apples this year. When Nick leaves immediately after the body is discovered, and doesn't come back for 24 hours, he becomes the prime suspect for Inspector Toby. Verity doesn't believe he can be the killer, so she sets out to investigate.

== Production ==
The novel is set in the New South Wales Blue Mountains, but the film was shot in the Adelaide Hills. The miniseries was produced by the South Australian Film Corporation and aired on the Nine Network. The miniseries was released on DVD by Umbrella Entertainment in 2021.

The miniseries is largely faithful to the novel. However the character of Verity is portrayed quite differently. She is blonde rather than brunette, and a more extroverted and confident figure on screen. Rodney is the only character from the novel who was removed from the miniseries. Inspector Toby is a handsome character in the books who ultimately becomes a love interest to Verity; in the miniseries, this role is taken by Det. Con McClinchy, with Toby becoming an older and very eccentric figure.

== Reception ==
Stephen Knight in the Sydney Morning Herald writes "Visually re-presented as it is in a form very faithful to a fine novel, Grim Pickings is a triumph for Liddy Clark, a well-deserved outlet for Jennifer Rowe, and a source of thoughtful enjoyment for an audience that may, from early accounts of good sales overseas, become world-wide." Also in Sydney Morning Herald Marion MacDonald says "Grim Pickings, the book, was a neat and lively whodunnit. Grim Pickings, the mini-series, was a drab and messy whocares." Barbara Hooks of the Age says "The director, Ricardo Pellizzeri, has labored the comic relationship between the mandatory amateur sleuth (Liddy Clark) and the clod-hopping plod (Max Cullen). The result is an uneasy spoof in which the suspects (every other member of the cast) begin to behave as if being accused of the dastardly deed is just another jolly jape in a week frittered away on Auntie's farm."
