= Fairy Realm =

Fantasy novels

Fairy Realm is a series of ten children's fantasy novels by Australian author Jennifer Rowe, writing under the pseudonyms Mary-Anne Dickinson and Emily Rodda. Rowe is also the author of the series Deltora Quest and Rowan of Rin. In the U.K, the series was published under the title Fairy Charm.

== Plot ==
The series follows the adventures of Jessie, an unsuspecting girl, whose grandmother happens to be a fairy queen who ran away to the human world with her human husband, Robert Belairs. The series chronicles Jessie's travels to the magical world of the Fairy Realm. In each story, she obtains a new charm for her bracelet. Jessie also travels to defeat Valda, her grandmother's evil cousin, and deals with real-world issues such as family disagreements, fitting in at a new school, and a teacher who dislikes her.

== Major themes ==
The main themes of the Fairy Realm series are the value of hospitality, kindness, and friendship, as well as the necessity of hope. In each book, Jessie benefits from the hospitality of magical creatures, and works together with her new friends to solve a magical problem in the Fairy Realm. Even when other characters are upset or panicked, Jessie maintains an attitude of bravery and optimism, which enables her to solve her problems.

== Publishing details ==
The first six books were published between 1994 and 1996 by Bantam Books, Sydney, under the collective title of the Storytelling Charms Series, written by Mary-Anne Dickinson and illustrated by Veronica Oborn. The first book came with the bracelet of the title, and the five subsequent books came with the charm received by Jessie in the story. The first six books were later re-released under the author's second pen name, Emily Rodda.

All of the covers for the books were illustrated by Raoul Vitale.

== Novels ==
1. The Charm Bracelet (1994). Jessie visits her grandmother, who seems more forgetful than usual, and the charm bracelet her grandmother always wears is gone. Jessie discovers a realm of magic where her grandmother is the rightful queen. So begins the adventure to save the realm from its enemies, the Outlanders.
2. The Flower Fairies (1994)
3. The Third Wish (1995)
4. The Last Fairy-Apple Tree (1995)
5. The Magic Key (1995)
6. The Unicorn (1996)
7. The Star Cloak (2005)
8. The Water Sprites (2005)
9. The Peskie Spell (2006)
10. The Rainbow Wand (2006)

Various compendiums have also been published in Australia and the U.K.
