= Kideo (TV series) =

Australian educational television show (1993–94)

Kideo is an Australian educational television show for kids. Each episode focused on a different topic and it was broadcast by the ABC on Sunday mornings. Beginning in 1993 it was a 25 minute show which was shown during the Couch Potato wrapper show.

Kideo was directed by John Clark, written by Clark with Karl Kruszelnicki and produced by Ian Iveson. It was co-presented by teenagers Stephanie Hardy and Daniel Taylor. It featured the Question Man (Rory O'Donoghue), Mrs Nobel (Sheila Kennelly) and the comedy duo the Empty Pockets (Matthew Quartermaine and Matthew Parkinson).

== Episodes ==
- Sunlight
- Art
- Humans
- Numbers
- Gravity
- Getting Lost
- Weather
- Animals
- Fire & Ice
- Space
- Ecology
- Flight
- No Time For Dances

== See also ==
- List of Australian television series
