= Liddy Clark =

Australian politician and actress

Minister for Aboriginal and Torres Strait Islander Policy
- In office 12 February 2004 – 3 March 2005
- Premier: Peter Beattie
- Preceded by: Judy Spence
- Succeeded by: John Mickel

Member of the Queensland Legislative Assembly for Clayfield
- In office 17 February 2001 – 9 September 2006
- Preceded by: Santo Santoro
- Succeeded by: Tim Nicholls

Personal details
- Born: Elizabeth Anne Clark; 6 November 1953 (age 72) Adelaide, South Australia, Australia
- Party: Labor
- Occupation: Politician (former); Actress; Director; Producer; TV presenter

Elizabeth Anne Clark (born 6 November 1953) is an Australian former politician with the Labor Party in the Queensland Legislature who held the seat for Clayfield and also an actress of television and film, director, producer and presenter, credited as Liddy Clark and Liddy Clarke.

== Acting career ==
Clark has various film and television credits to her name. She is possibly best known however, for her two small screen roles in the cult series Prisoner. She played child killer Bella Albrecht for two episodes in 1979 and Sharon Smart, the victim of a crooked religious cult, for six episodes in 1983.

In 1988, Clark played the role of battered wife Kerry Barlow in Home and Away. She was a regular cast member in the series Fire and has made guest appearances in Cop Shop, Matlock Police, The Sullivans, Kingswood Country, A Country Practice and Echo Point. She also featured in the Prisoner re-imagining series Wentworth.

She was a presenter on the long-running children's program Play School.

Clark's film credits include Mad Dog Morgan, Blue Fin, The Chant of Jimmie Blacksmith, Touch and Go, Kitty and the Bagman and Annie's Coming Out.

== Political career ==
In the 1998 Queensland state election, she challenged Liberal minister Santo Santoro in the normally safe Liberal seat of Clayfield. While Santoro defeated her on the first count, Clark picked up a seven percent two-party swing to make the seat marginal.

In 2001 she challenged Santoro again, and this time won. Even allowing for the massive Labor wave that swept through the state in that election, Clark's election was considered a shock result. She was reelected in 2004.

She was briefly Minister for Indigenous Affairs in the government of Peter Beattie. She was involved in the so-called "Winegate" affair. A bottle of wine was taken aboard a government jet travelling to a "dry" indigenous community in North Queensland. Two of Clark's staff were moved from their jobs over the affair, and after an independent inquiry Clark was cleared of any wrongdoing.

She resigned from the Ministry in March 2005.

== Filmography ==
=== Film ===
Year	Title	Role	Type
1975	Sidecar Racers	Cashier	Feature film
1976	Caddie	Receptionist	Feature film
1976	Mad Dog Morgan	Alice	Feature film
1977	The Importance of Keeping Perfectly Still		Film short
1977	Blue Fire Lady	Betty (as Liddy Clarke)	Feature film
1978	Blue Fin	Ruth Pascoe	Feature film
1978	The Chant of Jimmie Blacksmith	Kate	Feature film
1980	Touch and Go	Helen	Feature film
1982	Cargo		Film short
1982	Kitty and the Bagman	Kitty O'Rourke	Feature film
1983	On Guard	Amelia	Film short
1984	Annie's Coming Out	Sally Clements	Feature film
1986	Push Start		Film short
1989	To Forget Ghosts		Film short
1993	The Nostradamus Kid	'General Booth Enters Heaven' Strolling Player	Feature film
1998	Waste		Feature film
2003	About Face		Film short

=== Television ===
Year	Title	Role	Type
1974	Matlock Police	Patti	TV series, 1 episode
1977	Bluey	Esme Fulcher	TV series, 1 episode
1977	The Sullivans	Marge	TV series, 4 episodes
1978–1981	Cop Shop	Joanne McPherson / Karen Ashby / Kathy Simpson / Sandra Mazzorino	TV series, 6 episodes
1979	Ride on Stranger	Shannon	TV miniseries, 4 episodes
1979–1980	Don't Ask Us	Various characters	TV series
1981	A Sporting Chance	Jo Travinska	TV series, 10 episodes
1981	Holiday Island	Meredith	TV series, 1 episode
1982; 1992	A Country Practice	Louisa Kennedy / Faith Finlay	TV series, 5 episodes
1982	Living Together		TV pilot
1982	Jonah	Pinkey	TV miniseries, 4 episodes
1982–1984	Play School	Presenter	TV series, 5 episodes
1982	Watch This Space	Herself	TV series
1981; 1983	Prisoner	Bella Ulbricht / Sharon Smart	TV series, 8 episodes
1980; 1984	Kingswood Country	Jennifer / Vicki	TV series, 2 episodes
1986	The Challenge		TV miniseries, 3 episodes
1987	Coda	Sally Reid	TV movie
1988	Home and Away	Kerry Barlow	TV series, 10 episodes
1988	Swap Shop	Dot	TV series
1988	Barlow and Chambers: A Long Way From Home (aka Dadah Is Death)	Gilda Rickman	TV miniseries, 2 episodes
1988; 1989	Rafferty's Rules	Faye Irwin	TV series, 3 episodes
1989	Grim Pickings	Verity ‘Birdie’ Birdwood	TV miniseries, 2 episodes
1989	Living With The Law		TV series
1990	The Flying Doctors	Carol	TV series, 1 episode
1991	G.P.		TV series, 1 episode
1995	Echo Point	Iris Delaney	TV series, 11 episodes
1995–1996	Fire	Jean Diamond	TV series, 17 episodes
2012	Tangle	Dr. Taylor	TV series, 1 episode
2015	Wentworth	Hazel Fullager	TV series, 1 episode
2025	The White Lotus	Australian Woman	1 episode

== Stage ==
=== As actor ===
Year	Title	Role	Type
1974	Doctor in the House	Miss Winslow 'Riggie', a nurse	Princess Theatre, Melbourne, Warner Theatre, Adelaide, Newcastle Civic Theatre with AETT & Crawford Theatre Productions
1976	The Foursome		VCA, Melbourne with MTC
1976	City Sugar	Nicola Davies	St Martins Theatre, Melbourne with MTC
1977	No Worries	Wendy	La Mama, Melbourne
1977	Ravages: Dropping In	Jean	La Mama, Melbourne
1977	Obsessive Behaviour in Small Spaces	Spider Prentiss	UNSW Old Tote Parade Theatre, Sydney
1978	Makassar Reef	Camilla Ostrov	Russell Street Theatre, Melbourne with MTC
1978	Freaks	Petunia	Playbox Theatre, Melbourne with Hoopla Theatre Foundation
1980	Ticka-Tocka-Linga		Victorian regional tour with Victoria State Opera
1980	Big River	Monica Hindmarsh	Arts Theatre, Adelaide, Canberra Theatre, Russell Street Theatre, Melbourne, with MTC
1983	On Our Selection	Lily White	Melbourne Athenaeum with MTC
1984	Don's Party		North Qld regional tour with New Moon Theatre Company
1984	Beach Blanket Tempest	Kelly	North Qld & NT regional tour, Playhouse, Adelaide, Canberra Theatre, University of Sydney with New Moon Theatre Company
1985–1986	Sons of Cain	Crystal	Playhouse, Melbourne, Theatre Royal Sydney, Suncorp Theatre, Brisbane, Wyndham's Theatre, London, with MTC
1987	Educating Rita	Rita	Playhouse, Newcastle, with Hunter Valley Theatre Company
1987	Away		Townsville Civic Hall with New Moon Theatre Company
1989	Nice Girls	Prue	Anthill Theatre, Melbourne, Monash University with Playbox Theatre Company
1989	The Man from Mukinupin		Suncorp Theatre, Brisbane with QTC
1990	After Dinner		New England Theatre Company, Armidale
1990	Beach Blanket Tempest		Q Theatre, Penrith
1993	Summer of the Aliens		Cremorne Theatre, Brisbane, with Metaluna Theatre Company & QPAC
1993	Canaries Sometimes Sing		Marian Street Theatre, Sydney
1994	A Bedfull of Foreigners		Newcastle Civic Theatre, Canberra Theatre with Les Currie Productions
	Chapter Two		MTC
	Benefactors		MTC

=== As director ===
Year	Title	Role	Type
1992	Robin Hood and the Cheryl of Nottingham	Director	Tilbury Hotel, Sydney

Parliament of Queensland
Preceded by Santo Santoro	Member for Clayfield; 2001–2006	Succeeded by Tim Nicholls
