= Rondo (series) =

Book series by Jennifer Rowe

The Rondo series is a children's fantasy novel trilogy written by Jennifer Rowe under the pen name Emily Rodda.

== The Key to Rondo ==
The Key to Rondo is the first book of the Rondo trilogy.

=== Plot ===
After Leo's Great Aunt Bethany dies, Leo receives a family heirloom - an elaborate and fancy music box. There are four rules to the box:

1. Never turn the key more than three times.

2. Never wind the box when the music plays.

3. Never close the lid before the music stops.

4. Never move the box while the music is playing.

Leo, being the predictable, responsible boy he is, never even considers breaking the rules. And if he hadn't, perhaps for the rest of his life, the music box would have remained just that - a music box. He never expected his cousin Mimi Langlander to enter the equation.

Mimi is sour, sarcastic and short-tempered; therefore it comes as no surprise to Leo that she is friendless. Even her own family can’t stand her. Things are exacerbated when Mimi, disregarding the rules, makes Leo turn the box five times. Out steps the evil Blue Queen, who introduces the kingdom of Rondo, the world inside the music box, to the Langlander cousins. The Blue Queen informs the cousins that for generations, Langlanders have traveled to Rondo using the Key of Rondo, which allows them entry to both worlds. The Blue Queen attempts to lure the Langlanders into Rondo, and when they refuse, she steals Mimi's dog Mutt back into Rondo, leaving the 'Key', a ring, behind.

Heartbroken and distressed by the loss of her dog, Mimi takes the 'Key’ and - despite Leo's warnings - enters Rondo. What Mimi doesn’t count on is Leo being dragged along into Rondo with her. As Mimi refuses to return to her world without Mutt, Leo reluctantly agrees to join Mimi in her quest to retrieve her dog. In the process, they expose several ancient secrets, defeat the Blue Queen, recover Mutt the dog, and discover the real Key; a pendant Mimi inherited from her Great Aunt Bethany. With that Key, Mimi, Leo and Mutt exchange farewells with their new friends and travel back to their world.

=== Main characters ===
- Leo Zifkak: (also a Langlander) The owner of the magical music box in which Rondo is situated. He and his cousin Mimi travel to Rondo and defeat the Blue Queen.
- Mimi Langlander: Leo's cousin and owner of the Key of Rondo.
- Mutt: Mimi's mustard coloured dog
- Bertha: Farmer McDonald's watchpig
- Hal: (Formerly known as Henry Langlander) The wizard who, with the help from Conker, Freda and Tye, depleted the Blue Queen's power and put an end to the Dark Time (the Blue Queen's reign).. It is rumored that Hal lost his magical powers in that battle. He now acts, secretly, as a hero.
- Conker: A dot-catcher, and one of Hal's old companions at the last battle, where he helped, along with Freda and Tye, to end the Blue Queen's reign.
- Freda: Conker's talking duck, friend, companion and dot-catching helper. The feathers around her eyes look like a mask.
- Tye: A mysterious woman and the last of the Terlemaine. She is part human, the rest Tiger. The Terlemaine was a great species and race of a people. The Blue Queen destroyed most of them, with her sorcery in the Dark Times
- Spoiler: (Also known as "Wicked" Uncle George) The Blue Queen's assistant, he became a thief once the Dark Time ended.
- The Blue Queen: An evil witch and queen. Her real name is Indigo. She had once taken over the world and land of Rondo, but her reign was ended by Hal, Conker, Freda and Tye. The Blue Queen is demented and wicked.

=== Creatures ===
- Dots: Small cruel creatures who steal everything they can get. It's like a variant of our rat plague, just in Rondo.
- Terlemaines: A currently destroyed and devastated race of unique people. They are strange-looking, like the body of a tiger with black markings on their yellowish skin. Tye is the last of them now.
- Trolls: Trolls are also creatures that can be found in Rondo, or at least found under its bridge on the way to the Blue Queen's castle.
- Dragons: Dragons are also creatures that lives in Rondo. Sometimes a dragon can be seen flying in the sky.
- Talking animals: Talking animals are perhaps normal in Rondo. A lot of animal-characters that can talk appears in the series and book, which includes: Bertha the pig, Sly the fox, Freda the duck etc.
- Ogres: Ogres are just like trolls, but tend to be a lot more greedy and selfish. They take what they want and hold people captive. They are quite terrified but a guard comes to there rescue. That is the end

=== Awards ===
- 2007 Short-listed, Aurealis awards: Best children's (8–12 years) long fiction
- 2008 Short-listed Children's Book Council of Australia Book of the Year for Younger Readers Award
- 2008 Short-listed, NSW Premier's Literary awards: Patricia Wrightson Prize for Children
- 2008 Short-listed, Children's Choice Book awards (KROC, KOALA, YABBA & COOL awards): Fiction for Older Readers

== The Wizard of Rondo ==
The Wizard of Rondo is the second book in the Rondo series. It was published in 2008. It is the sequel to The Key to Rondo and is followed by The Battle for Rondo

The book's main characters are Leo and Mimi. They have a magical music box that can transport them to the world of Rondo, with the help of the key to Rondo, a medallion and necklace that contains the "hair" of the tip of the brush that painted the music box's beautiful sides as the world of Rondo's landscapes, and other than transporting one from the world and back to our own, it also gives the ability to the wearer to change everything they want to. But that power should not be misused.

=== Plot ===
Leo and Mimi have their roles to play in the world of Rondo. They need to visit Rondo occasionally to make sure the people of the world don't find out that they're not from Rondo, but they still have to deal with the evil Blue Queen. Suddenly, a great danger raises: the cloud palace.

They go on a quest to help find a wizard named Bing with the help of Conker and his talking duck and friend.

=== Characters ===
- Leo Zifkak: A sensible and reliable boy, not like his cousin Mimi. He is a Langlander, and one of the two "real main characters and protagonists".
- Mimi Langlander: Leo's cousin, a Langlander, one of the two "real" main characters/protagonists, and an imaginative, isolated, independent-minded girl whom no one outside Rondo likes very much. Leo and herself became friends in the first book. She is the owner of the Key to Rondo, a locket that contains hairs from the paintbrush that long ago created the music box. For this reason, the Key affords its owner absolute power over Rondo.
- Conker: An old man, Leo and Mimi's friend, and a reliable priceless companion. He is a friend of Hal (aka Henry Langlander) and stopped the Dark Times and ended the Blue Queen's reign by helping Hal in his old days, together with his talking duck Freda, and their companion, the last of the terlemaines Tye. Conker is a dot-catcher, that catches the strange pests of Rondo, dots.
- Freda: A talking duck, and Conker's friend and dot-catching assistant. She likes to eat dots. She can be very sarcastic. It can be dangerous to tease her, because she is very strong. She has black masked eyes.
- Wizard Bing: A wizard of Rondo. He is also the wizard whom Leo, Mimi, Conker, and Freda go on a quest to find in the second book.

== The Battle for Rondo ==
The Battle for Rondo is the third book in the Rondo series. It was published in 2009.
