= Rowan and the Zebak =

Book by Jennifer Rowe

- First edition (publ. Omnibus Books)
- Author: Emily Rodda
- Series: Rowan of Rin
- Publisher: Omnibus Books
- Publication date: 1999
- ISBN: 9781862913035
- Preceded by: Rowan and the Keeper of the Crystal (1998)
- Followed by: Rowan of the Bukshah (2003)

Rowan and the Zebak is a 1999 children's fantasy novel by Australian author Emily Rodda. It is the fourth book in the Rowan of Rin series.

== Plot summary ==
Rowan's younger sister, Annad, is snatched from Rin by a flying monster. Rowan must travel to the land of the Zebak – Rin's greatest enemies – in order to rescue her. As she has several times before, the witch Sheba gives a prophecy to guide them on their quest:

Five strange fingers form fate's hand,
Each plays a part at fate's command,
The fiery blaze the answer keeps,
And till its time each secret sleeps,
When pain is truth and truth is pain,
The painted shadows live again,
Five leave but five do not return,
Vain hope in pride and terror burn

The five fingers become Rowan, his Zebak born traveller friend Zeel, Allun the baker, A Maris friend, Perlain, and Sheba through correspondence.

During the journey to Zebak City, Rowan and his companions have their own strengths that allow the four to safely reach the city. Rowan is given a gift by Sheba, that she tell him that he can only open then he's on Zebak land. Sheba turns the fire into green flames, burns Rowan's hand, and summons pain in his arm, only to have something to laugh at. Later, this gift should become handy, as it contained a special metal medallion owned by the people of Rin's ancestors, a bunch of dry branches, that by burning them, would summon the green flames again, show Sheba's face, and tell a new prophecy. And a little bit of grass from Rin, gathered by Sheba, for a grach.

There they discover a forgotten truth. Once long ago, their people had been varied in nature and strength, 'strong' and 'weak'. This had been when Rowan's people were in captivity by the Zebak. Three hundred years ago, the Zebak captors separated the prisoners, they took the 'strong' people as their warrior slaves, brainwashing them into forgetting the families they left behind.

The story of what happened to the warriors was known, turning on their Zebak masters the helped the Travelers and the Maris repel them, and eventually settled into what is now Rin, but what happened to those left behind was not. The people left, gentle and timid, with the loss of their people began to decline, so when Rowan and his companions hear this tale there are only three survivors, a grandfather and his grandchildren, Shaaran, gentle like Rowan, and Norris- a throwback to his warrior lineage.

Five leave Rin, but five do not return, because along with bringing Annad home, Rowan and the others also bring the grandchildren to rejoin their people after many centuries apart.

== Characters ==
- Rowan of Rin/of the Bukshah: The "Thumb" on the hand of fate. Rowan plays his part by helping Unos a working grach fly to Rin.
- Sheba the Wise Woman: The "Pointer" on the hand of fate. Sheba leads the quest but through correspondence. She plays her part by giving the rhymes.
- Zeel of the Travelers: The "Middle" on the hand of fate. Zeel played her part by disguising herself as a Zebak Guard and taking the group to where the slaves are. Zeel is one of three Forerunners of the Travelers, and own a white kite of silk. She was born Zebak, but then she was two-years-old she was smuggled into the ocean by her parents, to help her escape the dangerous and terrible Zebak City.
- Allun the Baker: The "Ring finger" on the hand of fate. Allun played his part by keeping the groups minds of the Zebak and on Allun's jokes.
- Perlain of the Pandellis (Maris): The "Pinky" on the hand of fate. Perlain Plays his part at sea by helping the group get to shore.
- Annad of Rin: Snatched by a fighting grach. The group rescued her in the end.
- Shaaran the Slave: Shaaran is a timid slave to the Zebak. The group rescue her in the end.
- Norris the Slav:. Norris is a strong slave to the Zebak. The group rescue him in the end.
- Theiry the Slave: Theiry is an old man who is a timid slave to the Zebak. Theiry made an oath never to escape on his grach. Theiry dies because of a Zebak guard called Zanel. When Theiry died the group and slaves could ride back to Rin on his grach.

== Reception ==
Kirkus Reviews called Rowan and the Zebak "solid" and highlighted how "the tale flows smoothly with threatening episodes paced to keep the plot moving". However, they found the novel to be "lacking depth in terms of exploring grand ideas".

Booklist provided a starred review.
