= Witch Hunt (1999 film) =

- Genre: Crime Drama
- Written by: Shane Brennan
- Directed by: Scott Hartford-Davis
- Starring: Jacqueline Bisset; Cameron Daddo; Jerome Ehlers
- Theme music composer: Cezary Skubiszewski
- Country of origin: Australia
- Original language: English

Production
- Producers: Alan Hardy; Jackie O'Sullivan
- Cinematography: David Connell
- Editor: Bill Murphy
- Running time: 90 minutes
- Production company: Golden Square Pictures

Original release
- Network: Network Ten
- Release: 2 May 1999

Witch Hunt is a 1999 Australian crime drama TV movie, directed by Scott Hartford-Davis and written by NCIS: Los Angeles creator, Shane Brennan. It premiered on Australia's Network Ten on 2 May 1999 and also aired on Lifetime in the United States on October 29, 2000.

== Plot ==
A young girl goes missing and her father (Daddo) accuses his mother-in-law, Barbara (Bisset) of abducting her. He speculates about Barbara's deep involvement in the occult with the accusation that she is a witch. Barbara responds by accusing her son-in-law of abusing her granddaughter.

== Cast ==
- Jacqueline Bisset as Barbara Thomas
- Cameron Daddo as David Overton
- Jerome Ehlers as Detective Jack Maitland
- Suzi Dougherty as Jenny Page
- William Gluth as Ray Thomas
- Alexandra Schepisi as Linda Thomas
- Sullivan Stapleton as Craig Thomas
- Gerald Lepkowski as Kisho
- Grant Piro as Conlon
- Andrew Curry as Constable Grady
- Jane Hall as Reporter #1
