= Rowan and the Keeper of the Crystal =

Book by Jennifer Rowe

- First edition (publ. Omnibus Books)
- Author: Emily Rodda
- Series: Rowan of Rin
- Publisher: Omnibus Books
- Publication date: 1996
- ISBN: 9781862912618
- Preceded by: Rowan and the Travellers (1996)
- Followed by: Rowan and the Zebak (1999)

Rowan and the Keeper of the Crystal is a 1996 children's fantasy novel by Australian author Emily Rodda. It is the third book in the Rowan of Rin series.

== Plot summary ==
The Keeper of the Crystal – leader of the Maris people – is dying and a messenger brings this news to Rin

The Crystal dims. The Chooser is summoned...

Rowan of Rin learns that his mother, Jiller, is to choose the new leader from one of the three warring Maris clans. Doss of Pandellis, Asha of Umbray and Seaborn of Fisk are their names. When she falls victim to a strong poison, however, Rowan finds himself in the Chooser's position as well as trying to create the antidote to wake his mother from Death Sleep. Rowan then receives a riddle of how to make an antidote by bonding with the crystal and finding the recipe against the Keeper's will.

To mix the brew that wakes death sleep

Fill one spread hand with silver deep.
In a hungry pool moons raise their heads:
Pluck one and add the tears it sheds.
Stir slowly with new fighters quill,
Three times, no more, and let it still.
Add venom from your greatest fear--

One drop—and then the truth is clear.

They then exit the cavern of the keeper to go to the island where Orin the first keeper went to make the antidote. They think that the water will be the answer to the second line, however Doss says that it is too obvious and that it would not be the sea water. Rowan then sights a slight glint in the trees and runs toward it. They discover that it is a pool of clear water. Seaborn is then asked to retrieve the water but once his hand touches the water, clear tubular leeches then get attached to his hand. He screams in pain and gives Rowan the water. Then a bird swoops down towards them, but is actually diving toward to the pool to grab some leeches. The pool then turns silver as the leeches bury themselves under the silver sand. In the centre of the pool is a moon flower and they decide that they will have to grab the flower with their hands since the "tears" that they need is the sap. Rowan then remembers that in Rin they use scarecrows to scare away crows and they construct a bird like kite using Seaborn's cape and sticks. They fly the kite near the pool and Rowan puts his hand in the pool and grabs for the moonflower because all the other refuse to do it.

The 5th line means a quill from the bird that has not been plucked and exposed to air for a long time. They use Asha's cape which is silver as a mirror to attract the bird.

The venom of your greatest fear is the venom from the Great Serpent. They got the venom from the serpent while it was laying its eggs into the pool where Rowan got the moonflower from.

Links to Deltora Quest: Maris is the name given by the people of Deltora to an island that lies in the Silver Sea. The island lies to the west of Deltora, and is home to the village of Rin. To the east of Maris lies the dangerous Land of the Zebak. Deltorans call the island "Maris" because for centuries they have traded with the fish-like Maris people who live on the island's east coast in the village of Maris.

== Characters ==
- Asha of Umbray, one of the three candidates, tall for a Maris. Rowan could not choose her because she followed every single tradition and would not think differently.
- Doss of Pandellis, one of the three candidates, youngest of all the candidates. The Zebak controlled him until he became the new keeper because he thought about his people.
- Seaborn of Fisk, one of the three candidates, taller than Asha. He was not chosen because he thinks too quickly without knowing what his action might bring.
- Orin of Mirill, the first keeper and the first brewer of the death sleep antidote.
- Rowan of Rin or Rowan of the Bukshah, a young boy that becomes the Chooser after his mother Jiller is victimized.
- Jiller, Rowan's mother and the Chooser.
- Keeper, the keeper of the crystal.
- Strong Jonn of the Orchard, a strong man from Rin.
- Star, Rowan's bukshah and the most elite of the bukshah herd.
- Annad, Rowan's little sister.
- Timon, the teacher of Rin.
- Perlain of Pandellis, a Marris man that is the messenger of the Maris.
- Zebak- Evil people that have tried time and time again to destroy and capture Marris and Rin.

== Reception ==
Kirkus Reviews referred to Rowan and the Keeper of the Crystal as a "suspenseful, clever" follow-up to Rowan and the Travellers and highlighted the main character's "generous helpings of wit and courage".

Booklist also reviewed the novel.
