= Couch Potato (TV series) =

Australian children's television show

Couch Potato is an Australian children's television show broadcast on ABC TV in Australia and a staple of Classic ABC.

Airing on Sunday mornings, it was a "wrapper" show linking three or four animated or live action shows aimed at older pre-teen and young teenage audiences.

== Programs ==
- The Adventures of Sam
- Alias the Jester
- Alvin and the Chipmunks
- The Angry Beavers
- The Animals of Farthing Wood
- Animated Classic Showcase
- Aquila
- Archibald the Koala
- The Baby-Sitters Club
- Bananaman
- Bangers and Mash
- The Biz
- Bump in the Night
- The Cat Came Back
- Clowning Around
- Cro
- Danger: Marmalade At Work
- Danger Mouse
- The Demon Headmaster
- Dog Tracer
- The Dreamstone
- EC Plays Lift Off
- Educating Marmalade
- Escape from Jupiter
- Finders Keepers
- The Genie From Down Under
- Ghostwriter
- Inspector Gadget
- Johnson and Friends
- Kideo
- Lift Off
- Minty
- Mot
- Odysseus: The Greatest Hero of Them All
- Orson and Olivia
- Plasmo
- The Real Story of...
- Return to Jupiter
- Rocko's Modern Life
- Roland Rat
- Roland Rat Goes East
- Roland Rat's Winter Wonderland
- Round the Bend
- Round the Twist
- Santo Bugito
- The Secret World of Alex Mack
- Simon and the Witch
- SimsalaGrimm
- Ship to Shore
- Stickin' Around
- Sun on the Stubble
- SuperTed
- Toucan Tecs
- The Trap Door
- True Tilda
- The Twisted Tales of Felix the Cat
- Watt on Earth
- The World of Peter Rabbit and Friends
- You Can't Do That on Television

== Presenters ==
Grant Piro was the original host and stayed on the show for six years from 1991 to 1996. During its run, Couch Potato's presenters included Grant Piro, David Erskine a.k.a. Gilbert Gusset, Joey Kennedy, Jess Keeley, Jane Nield, Sam Prest, David Heinrich and Abby Coleman.

== History ==
- The show debuted on 17 March 1991 and ended on 24 June 2001.
- Originally intended to be an educational program for children, Grant Piro was asked to host by an Adelaide producer of the ABC. Ten episodes were initially filmed, based on science experiments in conjunction with the education department at the ABC.
- According to Grant Piro, "a producer and I decided to hijack the program. We said, 'how about we try and make it a bit more anarchic?’ We decided to break some of the ABC's rules and see how much we could get away with and we ended up breaking a lot of rules over the next six years. Couch Potato stopped being educational and became more about comic sketches and I think that's where the appeal took off”.
- In February 2005, Couch Potato had a spiritual successor in a similar show called RollerCoaster which aired on weekday afternoons and Sunday mornings until 30 January 2010.

== See also ==
- ABC
- ABC Kids
