= Rowan of the Bukshah =

2003 novel by Jennifer Rowe

- First edition cover
- Author: Emily Rodda
- Series: Rowan of Rin
- Genre: Children's literature; Fantasy
- Publisher: Omnibus Books
- Publication date: 2003
- ISBN: 1-862-91495-8
- Preceded by: Rowan and the Zebak (1999)

Rowan of the Bukshah (titled Rowan and the Ice Creepers in North America) is a 2003 children's fantasy novel by Australian author Emily Rodda.

It is the fifth and final book in the Rowan of Rin series.

== Plot summary ==
The beasts are wiser than we know
And where they lead, four souls must go.
One to weep and one to fight,
One to dream and one for flight.
Four must make their sacrifice.
In the realm twixt fire and ice
The hunger will not be denied,
The hunger must be satisfied.
And in that blast of fiery breath,
The quest unites both life and death.

Winters have been getting colder and longer the past few years, posing mounting problems for the people of the valley of Rin. This year, in what should be spring the people are still in the dead of winter, with no end to the cold in sight. The people are worried, because if the winter continues much longer, their food storehouses will be empty. A decision is made to evacuate to the coast, to finish the winter with the Travelers and the Maris. The group departs, leaving behind Rowan, Brondon, Sharron and Norris. Rowan will care for his beloved Bukshah; Brondon will care for Lann, the elderly village leader; and the other two are newcomers to the group who returned with Rowan from the Land of the Zebak. When a new enemy, the ice creepers, are discovered, Rowan follows Sheba's advice. He takes Norris and Sharron, and sets off on a long trek through the land following the Bukshah. Along the way, Zeel joins the trek (thus completing the introductory rhyme; Sharron to weep, Norris to fight, Rowan to dream, and Zeel for flight). The Bukshah lead them to the mountain, where they learn some new and terrifying facts.

When the Bukshah are fenced, they cannot go up the mountain to eat the seals on the ice creeper nests, preventing the numbers from growing and the habitual spreading. When the ice creepers multiply they cause the cold to grow. When the Bukshah are free to roam, they make an annual pilgrimage to the mountain and keep the ice creepers under control, preventing the rise of a cold time.

Far more chilling is the extended truth about what happened to the people of the Valley of the Gold. In Travelers, Rowan already discovered the truth about the destruction of the Valley of Gold. Due to the mountain berry plants the soil was loosened and the Valley was destroyed by a landslide. Here he learns much more.

When the Zebak invaded and word of the invasion was sent to the Valley, the message was received. Leaving only two behind (the Keepers of the Bukshah and the Silks), the villagers set out for the coast. On their way they were ambushed by the Zebak, captured and taken as slaves. One man escaped and returned to the Valley to warn the others. Fearing other attacks the three followed the Bukshah into the heart of the mountain where they were trapped by the landslide that destroyed the Valley as they knew it. Rowan and his companions learn this from the silks that were kept as up-to-date as possible. From this they learn the truth, that the people of Rin were once the people of the Valley of the Gold, that the land is their home, and has always been their home.

"Yes," he said. "At last the people truly can come home."

== Critical reception ==
Sally Murphy, writing on the Aussie Reviews website, noted: "This is the fifth and final book in the Rowan series, and Rodda does not disappoint. Favourite characters from previous episodes work alongside Rowan to face his biggest challenge yet, and all dig deep to find the answer to Rin’s problems. A satisfying conclusion to the series."

In The Age Lorien Kaye stated: "Because it has such a tight plot, the book can stand alone, but it is more satisfying if read as part of the series. Rowan's development over the series is one of its most satisfying aspects and, in the last book, the history of Rodda's invented world is fleshed out...Young readers will enjoy trying to guess the meaning of the prophetic rhymes that Rowan mysteriously receives to guide him. They will also enjoy being terrified by the scary monsters."

== Publication history ==
After the book's initial publication by Omnibus Books in 2003, it was reprinted by the same publisher in 2004 and 2006, and included in the author's collection, The Journey in 2023, also from the same publisher.

The novel was also translated into Japanese in 2003 and Danish in 2005.
