= Grant Piro =

Australian actor

Grant Piro is an Australian actor. He is best known as the host of the children's television show Couch Potato on the ABC. He also appeared as Captain Schnepel in Escape From Pretoria.

== Personal life ==
Piro is married to Australian soprano and musical theatre icon Marina Prior. They have five children in a blended family. Two of the children (Jackson and Madison) are biologically Piro's from a former relationship, while three are biologically Prior's, from a former relationship.

== Career ==
Piro began his career in 1983 in the Australian television soap opera Sons and Daughters.

After completing George Miller's film Bushfire Moon (Miracle Down Under) in 1987, a chance meeting with British comedy legend Ray Cooney led to a three-year stint in the UK where he appeared in several of Ray's plays: It Runs in the Family, Wife Begins at Forty, the latter alongside the great Jimmy Edwards, as well as TV programs such as Casualty and Shelley.

He returned to Australia in 1990 to become the host of the ABC children's television program Couch Potato. During the 1990s, Grant appeared in a large number of Australian television dramas that included Janus, Correlli, G.P., Halifax f.p., Blue Heelers, SeaChange, Wildside, Good Guys Bad Guys, McLeod's Daughters, The River Kings, The Territorians, Stingers, Twisted Tales, Tales of the South Seas, Witch Hunt, and more. This trend continued beyond 2000 with appearances in Blue Heelers and Stingers again, Marshall Law, Crashburn, Headland, Rain Shadow, The Librarians, The Elephant Princess, Sea Patrol, and Miss Fisher's Murder Mysteries.

Grant Piro became one of Australia's most respected theatre actors, with performances in Under Milk Wood, Whose Life Is It Anyway, Moby Dick, The Merry Widow, Laughter on the 23rd Floor, The Producers, The 39 Steps, Cat On A Hot Tin Roof, Dirty Rotten Scoundrels, The Drowsy Chaperone, Hairspray, His Girl Friday, and Hate.

His performance in the MTC's production of Realism saw him critically acclaimed for his display of the acting technique known as biomechanics. He appeared as several characters in the Rolf de Heer cult film Bad Boy Bubby, worked with film director Scott Hicks on his films Call Me Mr. Brown and Sebastian and the Sparrow, with Paul Hogan in Crocodile Dundee in Los Angeles, appeared in the French feature L'Amour En Embuscade (Love in Ambush) for Carl Shultz, and the films The Outsider, Darkness Falls, The Condemned, Save Your Legs, and Crime & Punishment.

== Filmography ==
=== Television ===
Year	Title	Role	notes	Ref
1983-84	Sons and Daughters	Tony Parker	TV series, 119 episodes	
1986	Push Start		TV movie	
1987	Pals	Rocky	TV series	
1988	Captain Johnno	Kevin	TV movie	
1989	Casualty	Glenn Buchanan	TV series, 1 episode	
1989	Shelley	George	TV series, 1 episode	
1990	Second Childhood	Mr Cruikshank	TV movie	
1991	Couch Potato	Host/Presenter	TV series	
1991	Finders Keepers (aka The Finder)	Max	TV series, 10 episodes	
1991	The River Kings	Spud	TV miniseries, 3 episodes	
1994	Janus	Cassidy	TV series, 2 episodes	
1995	Glad Rags	Warren Hamm	TV series, 6 episodes	
1995	Correlli	Toby Miller	TV miniseries, 8 episodes	
1996	The Devil Game	Costello	TV movie	
1996	McLeod's Daughters	Steve Creeley	TV movie	
1996	The Territorians	Danny Leydon	TV movie	
1996	The Bite	Miles	TV miniseries	
1996	Twisted Tales	Merrill	TV series, 1 episode	
1997	Love in Ambush	Jon Kincaid	TV movie	
1997	Good Guys Bad Guys	Gavin 'The Goat' La Rousse	TV series, 1 episode	
1998	SeaChange	Bryce Reardon	TV series, 3 episodes	
1998	Halifax f.p.	Terry Lansdown	TV series, Season 3, episode 2	
1998	Tales of the South Seas		TV series	
1998	Driven Crazy	Wobbly Gurgle	TV series, 1 episode	
1999	Wildside	Peter Gilmour	TV series, 1 episode	
1999	Witch Hunt	Conlon	TV movie	
1999	Airtight	Freddy	TV movie	
2002	MDA	David Smith	TV series, 1 episode	
1999-2003	Stingers	Brian Dennison / Tony Tennant || TV series, 2 episodes		
2002	Marshall Law	Hallion	TV miniseries, 4 episodes	
2003	CrashBurn	Adam	TV series, 13 episodes	
2006	Headland	Doctor Baker	TV series, 1 episode	
2007	Rain Shadow	James Campbell	TV miniseries, 6 episodes	
2007	The Librarians	Piero Chiappi	TV series, 5 episodes	
2007-10	City Homicide	Craig Pierce / Wayne Styles	TV series, 3 episodes	
2008-09	The Elephant Princess	Jim Wilson	TV series, 18 episodes	
2009	Sea Patrol	Jay Fennelly	TV series, 1 episode	
2012	Winners & Losers	Mime Evans	TV series, 1 episode	
2014	INXS: Never Tear Us Apart	Molly Meldrum	TV miniseries, 2 episodes	
2015	Miss Fisher's Murder Mysteries	Mighty Merve MacKenzie	TV series, 1 episode	
2016	Jack Irish	Senator Mackie	TV series, 5 episodes	
2017	Sherazade: The Untold Stories	Porter / Ali Baba (voice)	TV series, 22 episodes	
2017	Hoges: The Paul Hogan Story	Dustin Hoffman	TV miniseries, 1 episode	
2017	Newton's Law	Sergeant Robert Malouf	TV miniseries, 5 episodes	
2017	The Ex-PM	Bambino	TV series, 1 episode	
2018	Olivia Newton-John: Hopelessly Devoted to You	Grossman	TV miniseries, 1 episode	
2018	Wentworth	Doctor Chamberlain	TV series, 1 episode	
2018	True Story with Hamish & Andy	Gordon	TV series, 1 episode	
2018	Wanted	Gary	TV series, 2 episodes	
2018	How to Stay Married	Michael Fassmember	TV series, 1 episode	
2019	My Life is Murder	Bob nNble	TV series, 1 episode	
2023	Utopia	Patrick	TV series, 1 episode	
2023	Warnie	Graham Halbish	TV miniseries:1 episode	
2025	The Newsreader	Wayne	TV series: 4 episodes	

=== Film ===
Year	Title	Role	Notes	Ref
1984	Abduction... Who's Next?	Ben	Short film	
1986	Playing Beatie Bow	Pino	Feature film	
1986	Call Me Mr. Brown	Mt. Isa Miner	Feature film	
1987	The Lighthorsemen	Charlie	Feature film	
1987	Bushfire Moon	Angus Watson	Feature film	
1988	Sebastian and the Sparrow		Feature film	
1988	Wife Begins at 40	Leonard Harper		
1993	Bad Boy Bubby	Salesman	Feature film	
1996	The Big Maybe	Husband	Short film	
1997	Amy	PC Franklin	Feature film	
1997	Joey	John O'Bannon	Feature film	
2000	Mr. Accident	Lyndon	Feature film	
2001	Crocodile Dundee in Los Angeles	Guide	Feature film	
2002	The Outsider	Woodrow Wharton	Feature film	
2003	Darkness Falls	Larry Fleishman	Feature film	
2007	The Independent	Bradley Evans	Feature film	
2007	The Condemned	Moyer	Feature film	
2010	Don't Be Afraid of the Dark	Creature (voice)	Feature film	
2010	The Adjustable Cosmos	Emperor Frederick (voice)	Short film	
2012	Save Your Legs	Punter	Feature film	
2014	Predestination	Boxing Commentator / News Report Announcer	Feature film	
2014	The Mule	Professor Dylan Kanarakis	Feature film	
2015	Sneezing Baby Panda: The Movie	Voice		
2015	Crime & Punishment	Quincey	Feature film	
2016	Spirit of the Game	Ken Watson	Feature film	
2020	Escape from Pretoria	Captain Schnepel	Feature film	
2025	Sacrifice	Charlie Hunter		

== Theatre ==
Year	Title	Role	Notes	Ref
1986	Pravda	Cartoonist / Bewildered Walking Man / Reporter / Photographer	Playhouse Adelaide	
1987	It Runs in the Family			
1987	Much Ado About Nothing	Boy / Messenger / Hugh Oatcake	Playhouse Adelaide	
1988	Wife Begins at Forty	Leonard Harper	Playhouse Adelaide, Comedy Theatre, Melbourne	
1993	Taking Steps		Playhouse Adelaide	
1993	Under Milk Wood		Playhouse Adelaide	
1994	Short Blacks with Shepard Pie: Red Cross		Promethean Theatre, Adelaide	
1994	Whose Life is it Anyway?		Price Theatre, Adelaide	
1996	Station 2: Eye of Another	Nick / Jed / Dominic / Frank	251 Wakefield Street, Adelaide	
1999	The Merry Widow	Njegus	State Theatre Melbourne, Festival Theatre Adelaide, Lyric Theatre Sydney	
2002	Hello, Dolly!	Ambrose Kemper / Rudolph Reisenweber	State Theatre, Melbourne	
2002	Laughter on the 23rd Floor		Playhouse Melbourne	
2004–05	The Producers	Carmen Ghia	Princess Theatre Melbourne, Lyric Theatre Brisbane, Lyric Theatre Sydney	
2007	The Madwoman of Chaillot		Playhouse Melbourne	
2008	Whose Life is it Anyway?		Lion Arts Centre, Adelaide	
2008	The 39 Steps		Playhouse Melbourne, Geelong Performing Arts Centre	
2008	Cat on a Hot Tin Roof	Gooper	Playhouse Melbourne	
2008	Gala		Southbank Theatre	
2009	Realism		Southbank Theatre with Melbourne Theatre Company	
2009	Master of the Revels		Southbank Theatre	
2009	Dirty Rotten Scoundrels	Andre Thibault	State Theatre Melbourne	
2010	The Drowsy Chaperone	Gangster	Playhouse Melbourne	
2010-11	Hairspray	Wilbur Turnblad	Princess Theatre Melbourne, Lyric Theatre Sydney	
2012	His Girl Friday		Playhouse Melbourne	
2013	Hate		Malthouse Theatre	
2016	Around the World in 80 Days	Detective Fix		
2017	Hello, Dolly!	Horace Vandergelder	Playhouse Melbourne	
2018	Oklahoma!	Ali Hakim	State Theatre, Melbourne	
2022	Girl from the North Country	Reverend Marlowe	Theatre Royal, Sydney, Her Majesty's Theatre, Adelaide, Comedy Theatre, Melbourne, Civic Theatre, Auckland, Wellington Opera House, Canberra Theatre, Lyric Theatre Brisbane	
2022	When the Rain Stops Falling		Space 28, Southbank	
	Moby Dick			
2024	A Christmas Carol	Fezziwig	Comedy Theatre	
2025	Follies		Palais Theatre	
