= Verity Birdwood =

Series of novels by Jennifer Rowe

- First appearance: Grim Pickings
- Last appearance: Lamb to the Slaughter
- Created by: Jennifer Rowe
- Portrayed by: Liddy Clark

In-universe information
- Gender: Female
- Occupation: Television researcher
- Nationality: Australian

Verity "Birdie" Birdwood is a fictional character, and the protagonist in a series of six murder mystery novels by Jennifer Rowe. Birdwood is a "scrappy TV researcher" who detects criminals in novels set against Australian backgrounds.

== Background ==
Verity Birdwood is the only child of Angus Birdwood, a wealthy lawyer. Her mother died in a car crash. Scruffy and unkempt, Birdie's most striking feature is her brown eyes, which she keeps hidden behind thick-rimmed glasses. Little is known about Birdie, but in Murder By The Book she invites Detective Dan Toby into her loft in Annandale, Sydney, for a drink.

== Titles ==
All first editions published by Allen & Unwin, Sydney, Australia.

- Grim Pickings (1987)
- Murder by the Book (1989)
- Death in Store (1991)
- The Makeover Murders (1992)
- Stranglehold (1993)
- Lamb to the Slaughter (1995)

== Mini-Series ==
The first book of the series Grim Pickings was made into a two part (four-hour) mini-series by the South Australian Film Corporation which aired on the Nine Network on 15 and 16 November 1989. Filmed in locations within the Adelaide Hills and Barossa Valley regions of South Australia, the series starred Lorraine Bayly, Max Cullen, Catherine Wilkin and Liddy Clark in the role of Verity "Birdie" Birdwood. Clark's "Birdie" was notably different in both appearance (Clark had short, blonde hair) and manner (Clark portrayed a more extroverted, outwardly confident Birdie).
