= Sporting Chance (TV series) =

1981 Australian television series

- Developed by: Peter Yeldham
- Written by: Peter Yeldham; Robert Caswell; Laura Jones
- Starring: Ray Barrett; Liddy Clark
- Country of origin: Australia
- Original language: English
- No. of seasons: 1
- No. of episodes: 10

Production
- Producer: Ray Alchin
- Running time: 50 minutes

Original release
- Network: ABC
- Release: September 3 – November 5, 1981

Sporting Chance is an Australian television series that aired on ABC in 1981. It featured Ray Barrett as a sports journalist and Libby Clark as his new assistant. Each episode sees them reporting on different sports. The show was shot on film and was created over a period of six months.

== Cast ==
- Ray Barrett as Robbo
- Liddy Clark as Jo Travinska
