= Murder Call =

1997-2000 Australian television series

- Main cast
- Created by: Hal McElroy; Jennifer Rowe
- Starring: Lucy Bell; Peter Mochrie; Geoff Morrell; Glenda Linscott; Jennifer Kent; Gary Day
- Country of origin: Australia
- No. of seasons: 3
- No. of episodes: 56 (list of episodes)

Production
- Executive producer: Kris Noble
- Producer: Peter Askew
- Production location: Sydney
- Running time: approx. 45 minutes
- Production company: Southern Star Entertainment

Original release
- Network: Nine Network
- Release: 11 August 1997 – 9 October 2000

Murder Call is an Australian television series, created by Hal McElroy for the Southern Star Entertainment and broadcast on the Nine Network between 1997 and 2000. The series was inspired by the Tessa Vance novels by Jennifer Rowe, both of which were adapted as episodes, while Rowe also developed story treatments for 38 episodes throughout the series.

== Synopsis ==
Murder Call focuses on cases confronted by an unconventional team of homicide detectives, Tessa Vance and Steve Hayden. Steve is an often light-hearted "man's man" who is moving up the career hierarchy. Tessa is more introspective and no-nonsense, and often solves the murder with her intuition and insight. Their team includes boss Inspector Malcolm Thorne, police Constable Dee Suzeraine, forensic services expert Lance Fisk, and unorthodox doctor Imogen "Tootsie" Soames.

== Production ==
Murder Call was initially conceived as an adaptation of the Verity Birdwood murder mystery novels by Jennifer Rowe. Birdwood is an amateur private investigator, who spends her time as a freelance journalist for the ABC. Sigrid Thornton was attached to play the role, with the program given a 26-episode order by the Seven Network under the title Murder Calling. Ultimately, creative differences - reportedly over whether or not the series should adopt a cosy Murder, She Wrote-style approach - saw the Seven Network let go of the property. Production moved to the Nine Network, with a relocation from Melbourne to Sydney during which time Thornton dropped out. The series was retitled Murder Calls before settling on its final name. Ultimately, desiring to create a series with a darker vein than the Verity Birdwood novels, McElroy switched to Rowe's Tessa Vance series, comprising the novels Suspect/Deadline and Something Wicked. Rowe provided story treatments for 38 of the series' 56 episodes, which were then expanded upon by the screenwriters.

Murder Call was filmed in Sydney and often shot the less spectacular side of the city. The exterior of the Homicide station was filmed at Ashington House (formerly AFT House/Delfin House), on O'Connell Street in Sydney.

The first production season consisted of 22 episodes as well as a TV movie, Deadline, based on the novel of the same name by Rowe (which would ultimately air in two parts). The second production season consisted of 32 episodes, which were designed to be aired over two years.

Ultimately, Nine aired the episodes over three televised seasons, dramatically out of production order. The third season commenced airing in 1999 but was cancelled in August of that year to budget concerns. The series was taken off air, with the final 9 episodes airing in late 2000. When the episodes were added to the 7plus streaming service in 2021, they were available in the original two production seasons, in order of production.

== Cast ==
=== Main ===
- Lucy Bell as Detective Tessa Vance
- Peter Mochrie as Detective Steve Hayden
- Glenda Linscott as Dr. Imogen 'Tootsie' Soames
- Geoff Morrell as Sergeant Lance Fisk
- Jennifer Kent as Constable Dee Suzeraine
- Gary Day as Detective Inspector Malcolm Thorne

=== Season 1 guests (1997) ===
- Alan David Lee as Robin Elbin (E12: "Wages of Sin")
- Bob Baines as Max May (E16: "Heartstopper")
- Brett Climo as Kim Kouros (E7: "Black Friday")
- Chris Haywood as Jack Teller (E6: "Hot Shot")
- Daniel Wyllie as Rorie Coombe (1 episode)
- Danny Roberts as Matt Propert (E7: "Black Friday")
- Diana McLean as Adele Andriette (E1: "Ashes to Ashes")
- Gosia Dobrowolska as Vida Kristov (E4: "Dead Clean")
- Ian Bliss as Scott McKenna (E1: "Ashes to Ashes")
- Inge Hornstra as Bliss Bridie (E9: "Something Wicked")
- Jacqueline Brennan as Leonie
- Jennifer Cluff as Elly Jago (E8: "Last Stop")
- Jeremy Callaghan as Ezra Sims (E1: "Ashes to Ashes")
- Jessica Napier as Brodie Cochrane (E5: "Who Killed Cock Robin?")
- Judi Farr as Mrs Parkins (E7: "Black Friday")
- Kieran Darcy-Smith as Felix Kiver (E3: "Cat and Mouse")
- Leeanna Walsman as Camilla Collins (E14: "Blood Heat")
- Lyn Collingwood as Mother Agnes (E12: "Wages of Sin")
- Melissa George as Petra Salinis (E6: "Hot Shot")
- Nicolle Dickson as Maddie Herman (E6: "Hot Shot")
- Paul Bishop as Mike Olsen (E15: "Fall from Grace")
- Paula Arundell as Rebecca Voss (E2: "The Burial")
- Penne Hackforth-Jones as Ena Rooth (E1: "Ashes to Ashes")
- Teo Gebert as Simon Kristov (E4: "Dead Clean")
- Victoria Longley as Cynthia Chase (E6: "Hot Shot")

=== Season 2 guests (1998) ===
- Helen Thomson as Chyna Gold (E1: "Dared to Death")
- Dee Smart as Mariena Soeteman (E1: "Dared to Death")
- Kate Fitzpatrick as Madeleine Gault (E2: "Many Unhappy Returns")
- Tory Mussett as Melissa Hindwood (E4: "Fatal Charm")
- Rebecca Smart as Claudine Kent (E4: "Fatal Charm")
- Anne Tenney as Nerida Hertzberg (E5: "Short Circuit")
- John Batchelor as Wayne Pax (E6: "Cold Comfort")
- Roy Billing as Harry Polding (E6: "Cold Comfort")
- Matt Boesenberg as Constable Ferris (E6: "Cold Comfort")
- Danielle Carter as Sharon Gavin (E7: "Murder in Reverse")
- Essie Davis as Judy St. John (E9: "Deadfall")
- Graeme Blundell as Morgan Mason (E9: "Dead Fall")
- Roxane Wilson as Kristen Charlton (E9: "Dead Fall")
- Barry Otto as Otis Farrow (E10-11: "Deadline (Parts 1 & 2)")
- Malcolm Kennard as Marty Matthewa (E10-11: "Deadline (Parts 1 & 2)")
- Carole Skinner as Mickey Lane (E10-11: "Deadline (Parts 1 & 2)")
- Damon Herriman as Lindsay Cramer (E10-11: "Deadline (Parts 1 & 2)")
- Richard O'Brien (E10-11: "Deadline (Parts 1 & 2)")
- Elizabeth Alexander as Hilary Windsor (E12: "Something Fishy")
- Rhondda Findleton as Freda Holland (E12: "Something Fishy")
- Anthony Hayes as Eddie Lamb (E13: "A Dress to Die For")
- Peter Sumner as Bette Fidler / Vic Bamford (E13: "A Dress to Die For")
- Brendan Higgins as Carl Sanderson (E13: "A Dress to Die For")
- Tony Sheldon as Garth Boyle (E13: "A Dress to Die For")
- Simon Burke as Guy Searle (E14: "Menu for Murder")
- Deborah Galanos as Paige Christian (E14: "Menu for Murder")
- Christine Stephen-Daly as Sonia Black (E15: "Cry Wolf")
- Jason Clarke as Zac Hartman (E16: "A View to a Kill")
- Martin Dingle-Wall as Drug Dealer (E16: "A View to Kill")
- Lewis Fitz-Gerald as Lionel MacKenzie (E16: "A View to Kill")
- Ivar Kants as Hugo Riccadelli (E17: "Blowing the Whistle")
- Anna Lise Phillips as Eileen Watson (E17: "Blowing the Whistle")
- Ann Burbrook as Celia Stemitt (E18: "Instrument of Death")
- Justin Monjo as Roland Lacey (E18: "Instrument of Death")
- Kate Fischer as Gabby Minogue (E19: "Bone Dead")
- Melissa Madden Gray as Rowena Brewster (E19: "Bone Dead")
- Jason Chong as Claude Wang
- Betty Lucas as Prudence Smith (1 episode)
- Susan Lyons as Amanda MacKenzie (E16: "A View to a Kill")
- Sarah Peirse as Harriet Fratelli (1 episode)

=== Season 3 guests (1999-2000) ===
- Aaron Jeffery as Rory Simmons (1 episode)
- Andrew McFarlane as Adrian MacKerras (1 episode)
- Annie Byron as Magda Trebor (E1: "Dead Offerings")
- Arianthe Galani as Antoinette de Bono
- Bartholomew John as Sebastian Tombs (E12: "A Stab in the Dark")
- Brian Rooney as Nero (1 episode)
- Bridie Carter as Jessica Millay (E20: "Done to Death")
- Josef Ber as Michael Frampton (1 episode)
- Justin Rosniak as Luchano Andrea (1 episode)
- Kate Raison as Abigail Easton (1 episode)
- Lenka Kripac as Lily Aureli (1 episode)
- Ling-Hsueh Tang as Emma (1 episode)
- Michala Banas as Kylie McDonald (E11: "Cut & Dried")
- Michael Denkha as Carlo (1 episode)
- Nicholas Bishop as Marshall Bowdon (1 episode)
- Norman Kaye as Vic Popov (1 episode)
- Paul Mercurio as Travis Draper (1 episode)
- Peter Kowitz as Richard Nossiter (1 episode)
- Rose Byrne as Sarah Watson (E17: "Still Life")
- Sandy Gore as Penny Satchwell (1 episode)
- Sarah Aubrey as Amy Simms
- Steve Le Marquand as David Hand (1 episode)
- Zoe Carides as Dr. Constance Young (E7: "A Blow to the Heart")

== Episodes ==
Murder Call ran for three seasons and produced 56 episodes.

Season	Episodes	Originally aired		Network
Season	Episodes	Season premiere	Season finale	Network
1	16	11 August 1997	23 November 1997	Nine Network
2	20	7 July 1998	24 November 1998	Nine Network
3	20	21 April 1999	9 October 2000	Nine Network

== Home media ==
It was announced by Via Vision Entertainment in March 2019 that they would be releasing the complete collection of Murder Call on DVD.

As of 2022, the series is available for streaming on Amazon Prime and 7plus. The episodes are rearranged into production, rather than broadcast, order.

Title	Format	Episodes	Discs	Region 4 (Australia)	Special features	Distributors
Murder Call Season 01	DVD	16	3	3 April 2019	None	Via Vision Entertainment
Murder Call Season 02	DVD	20	5	5 June 2019	The TV movie Deadline is included as a special feature, as it aired alongside this television season.	Via Vision Entertainment
Murder Call Season 03	DVD	21	5	4 September 2019	None	Via Vision Entertainment
Murder Call Complete Collection	DVD	57	13	7 October 2020	None	Via Vision Entertainment
