= Embassy (TV series) =

- Genre: Drama
- Created by: Ian Bradley
- Written by: Shane Brennan; Denise Morgan
- Directed by: Richard Sarell; Kate Woods; Chris Langman; David Evans; Karl Steinberg
- Starring: Bryan Marshall; Jim Holt; Gerard Maguire; Janet Andrewartha; Alan Fletcher; Nina Landis; Frankie J. Holden; Lex Marinos; Jim Holt; Catherine Wilkin; Gerard Maguire; John Polson
- Composer: Peter Sullivan
- Country of origin: Australia
- Original language: English
- No. of series: 3
- No. of episodes: 39

Production
- Executive producers: Ian Bradley; Jill Robb
- Producer: Alan Hardy
- Production locations: Melbourne and Rippon Lea, Australia; Suva, Fiji
- Editor: Chris Branigan
- Running time: 50 minutes
- Production companies: Australian Broadcasting Corporation; Grundy Motion Pictures

Original release
- Network: ABC
- Release: 12 September 1990 – 20 August 1992

Embassy is an Australian television series originally broadcast by ABC Television from 1990 to 1992. Three series were produced with a total of 39 episodes. The program is set in the Australian embassy of a fictional South-East Asian country called Ragaan, located half-way up the Malay Peninsula, somewhere between Thailand and Malaysia. It features stories about Australian ambassadors and their staff.

== Creation and production ==
Embassy was created by Grundy Television director Ian Bradley, producer of Prisoner, who first proposed the idea for a diplomatic series during the Iran hostage crisis in 1979.

It was produced by ABC Television with assistance from the Department of Foreign Affairs and Trade. The Minister for Foreign Affairs, Gareth Evans, was offered a cameo role. The script and story consultant was Garry Woodward, a former ambassador to Burma and China.

According to Woodward, the name Ragaan was 'a bastardisation' of Pagaan, the ancient capital of Burma. Producer Alan Hardy said the fictitious setting for the military dictatorship was 'based on about 20 countries'. 'It's an accurate representation of the lives of diplomats and how they have to deal with situations.'

The serial was filmed partly in Fiji. Suva was selected by producers as an ideal tropical shooting location for Port Victoria, the imaginary, run-down former British colonial capital of Ragaan.

== Reception ==
Embassy earned modest domestic viewing figures in Australia. It has been criticised as an example of Orientalism, and more specifically as 'an exercise in stereotyping as a confirmation of an Anglo-Australian cultural hegemony in which non-Anglo nationalities are reduced to a homogeneous, imaginary "other"'.

The star of the third series, New Zealand actress Catherine Wilkin, defended the program-makers' approach: 'Even though you obviously get the Western viewpoint of things in this mythical Muslim country, every effort is made to bring the other point of view across as well.'

Although Embassy was not broadcast in Malaysia, its production was one of a series of events in the late 1980s and early 1990s, chiefly involving Australian concerns over human rights and the environment, that in June 1990 led to a temporary freezing of relations between Kuala Lumpur and Canberra.

The show caused a diplomatic row between the two Commonwealth allies due to an assumption in Kuala Lumpur that the show's setting was a thinly-disguised depiction of Malaysia, and that ABC Television, which produced the show, was, as a state broadcaster, government-controlled. The Malaysian Prime Minister, Mahathir Mohamad, demanded that Embassy be taken off the air, complaining that it was an insult to his country and its official religion, Islam. Malaysia also banned an issue of the Asian Wall Street Journal covering the controversy.

In 1991 the second series of Embassy opened with the hanging of two drug traffickers, including scenes reminiscent of the hanging of two Australians in Kuala Lumpur in 1986, which the Australian Prime Minister, Bob Hawke, had famously condemned as 'barbaric'. In retaliation for the screening, TV3 in Malaysia showed a four-part news series about racism in Australia. RTM also broadcast a discussion forum with journalists about anti-Asian media bias in Australia.

The diplomatic downgrading damaged Australian investments and risked traditionally strong military ties with Malaysia. The Australian Foreign Minister, Gareth Evans, expressed his government's regret for the offence Embassy had caused, but played down the spat as one of the 'bumps and grinds that occur in regional relations'.

When Embassy was cancelled at the end of its third series, the ABC blamed declining ratings and denied its decision to end the controversial program had been influenced by outside pressures. Nevertheless, suspicions were voiced by Australian media and academia that diplomatic tensions had been a contributing factor in the cancellation.

== Cast ==
- Bryan Marshall as Ambassador Duncan Stewart
- Janet Andrewartha as his wife, Marion
- Alan Fletcher as Michael Clayton, the consul and political officer
- Nina Landis as Susan Derek, the Embassy's second secretary
- Nicki Wendt as Belinda Avery, the Ambassador's secretary
- Frankie J. Holden as Terry Blake, the press attache
- Shapoor Batliwalla as Rufus, the office manager
- Joseph Spano as Colonel (later General) Mahmoud
- Lex Marinos as Tariq Abdullah, Ragaan's Minister for Foreign Affairs
- Jim Holt as James Peake
- Catherine Wilkin as Ambassador Katherine Jensen
- Gerard Maguire as Freddie
- Anthony Wong as Lee, a political revolutionary
- John Polson as Vince Cooper
- Ria Yazaki
- Cecilia Trandang

=== Guests ===
- Ailsa Piper as Renare (1 episode)
- Brett Climo as Joshua (1 episode)
- Darren Yap as Hung (1 episode)
- Graham Harvey as Tom (1 episode)
- Heather Mitchell as Gillian (1 episode)
- Khym Lam as Lily / Josie (2 episodes)
- Kym Gyngell as Richardson (1 episode)
- Les Foxcroft as Harry (1 episode)
- Neil Melville as Phil Hartman (2 episodes)
- Nicholas Eadie as Edward Logan (1 episode)
- Penne Hackforth-Jones (1 episode)
- Irene Jones as Hannah (3 episodes)
- Peter Curtin as Green (1 episode)
- Robert Mammone as Rashid (1 episode)
- Robin Ramsay as Alex (1 episode)
- William McInnes as John Hancock (1 episode)
- Wynn Roberts as Dave (1 episode)

== See also ==
- List of Australian television series
