= Teen Power Inc. =

Book series created by Emily Rodda

Teen Power Inc., now known as Raven Hill Mysteries is a series of books created by notable Australian author Emily Rodda, even though many of the books are actually penned by other authors who receive credit on the inside title page. The series, originally published in the mid-1990s was reprinted under the name Raven Hill Mysteries. As of 2006, the first six titles have been reissued.

== Premise ==
The series revolves around six teenagers who have set up a part-time job agency, Teen Power Inc. (changed to Help-for-Hire in the American republished editions) to work for cash before and after school. Usually, their jobs end up getting them into trouble and each book in the series generally revolves around one main mystery for the gang to go through; with the narrator being the crime-solver. The squad consists of: Richelle Brinkley, Sunny Chan, Liz Free, Nick Kontellis, Tom Moysten and Elmo Zimmer.

== Structure ==
Each novel in the series is narrated by a different person. For the first fourteen books, the narration followed the cycle order of Liz-Tom-Richelle-Elmo-Sunny-Nick. However, after book 14 (Tom), book 15 was narrated by Sunny instead of Richelle. The series reverted to the original order for the fourth cycle (books 19–24) but then scrambled again for the fifth and last cycle (books 25–30), with Richelle starting the narration instead of Liz. However, each cycle of six books without exception has one contribution from every member of the Teen Power Inc group.

== The Raven Hill Mysteries reprint ==
The Teen Power Inc books were relaunched in the US in 2006 under the name Raven Hill Mysteries. In the reprints, the name of the job agency is changed to "Help-for-hire" and certain book titles were also changed (such as St Elmo's Fire becoming Deep Secrets). Further, the order of the reprints has been scrambled, causing major continuity problems given that the final book in the original series (Dead End) which dealt with a criminal from Teen Power's past coming back to seek revenge on the gang which put him in jail, has been published sixth in the new series and prior to the book which first introduced this criminal.

== Books ==
- #1 - The Ghost of Raven Hill - Narrated by Liz
- #2 - The Sorcerer's Apprentice - Narrated by Tom (co-author John St Claire)
- #3 - The Disappearing TV Star - Narrated by Richelle (co-author Mary Forrest)
- #4 - Cry of the Cat - Narrated by Elmo (co-author Mary Forrest)
- #5 - Beware the Gingerbread House - Narrated by Sunny
- #6 - Green for Danger - Narrated by Nick (co-author John St Clair)
- #7 - Breaking Point - Narrated by Liz
- #8 - The Secret of Banyan Bay - Narrated by Tom (co-author John St Clair)
- #9 - The Bad Dog Mystery - Narrated by Richelle (co-author Mary Forrest)
- #10 - Poison Pen - Narrated by Elmo (co-author Mary Forrest)
- #11 - The Missing Millionaire - Narrated by Sunny
- #12 - Crime in the Picture - Narrated by Nick (co-author John St Clair)
- #13 - Nowhere to Run - Narrated by Liz
- #14 - Dangerous Game - Narrated by Tom (co-author Robert Sexton)
- #15 - Haunted House - Narrated by Sunny
- #16 - The Case of Crazy Claude - Narrated by Nick (co-author Robert Sexton)
- #17 - Fear in Fashion - Narrated by Richelle (co-author Mary Forrest)
- #18 - Danger in Rhyme - Narrated by Elmo (co-author Mary Forrest)
- #19 - Cry Wolf - Narrated by Liz
- #20 - Photo Finish - Narrated by Tom (co-author Robert Sexton)
- #21 - Stage Fright - Narrated by Richelle (co-author Sam Kester)
- #22 - Saint Elmo's Fire - Narrated by Elmo (co-author Robert Sexton)
- #23 - Bad Apples - Narrated by Sunny
- #24 - The War of the Work Demons - Narrated by Nick (co-author Robert Sexton)
- #25 - Dirty Tricks - Narrated by Richelle (co-author Kate Rowe)
- #26 - Hot Pursuit - Narrated by Elmo (co-author Kate Rowe)
- #27 - Hit or Miss - Narrated by Liz (co-author Kate Rowe)
- #28 - Deep Freeze - Narrated by Tom (co-author Kate Rowe)
- #29 - The Secret Enemy - Narrated by Sunny
- #30 - Dead End - Narrated by Nick

== Characters ==
=== Main characters ===
- Liz (Elizabeth) Free - Liz is the de facto leader of the gang. It was originally her idea to set up Teen Power Inc., and she is very protective of it. She is the most sentimental out of the group, and genuinely cares a lot about others. Liz Free describes herself as "plain" - average height, average weight and shoulder-length brown hair. She enjoys op shopping and making her own clothes to wear. The daughter of a real estate father and bank teller mother, she has one younger brother Pete (although a continuity error in Breaking Point sees her brother renamed Danny) and a large shaggy dog Christo. Every Friday, she goes to the retirement home, 'Craigend', to visit Pearl Plummer and do her shopping for her.
- Tom (Thomas) Moysten - Tom is the typical class clown who likes to tell jokes and muck around in class. Despite this, he is a very talented artist and this is one of his key characteristics in the series, along with his fondness for eating. Tom is very tall and lanky. He has gangly arms and legs, and braces on his teeth. He is a messy dresser, which reflects his messy personality. His parents are divorced and he lives with his mother Grace and her new husband Brian, an ancient history teacher at Raven Hill High, and his two half-brothers Adam and Jonathan. There is high tension between Brian and Tom, although this eases towards the later books as each begins to understand the other a little more. Tom's biological father, Mel, is a painter who lives in Banyan Bay with his new wife Faye (Banyan Bay and Mel Moysten are both featured prominently in the book The Secret of Banyan Bay). He cannot swim. Tom and Sunny get on well because they both know what it is like to have divorced parents.
- Richelle Brinkley - Richelle is the frequently vague and rather vain member. She has known Liz since kindergarten, and they are still friends, although they have little in common. Richelle is tall with blue eyes and blonde hair. She dreams of being a model or a movie star. She often surprises her friends with perspicacious remarks. Richelle lives with her mum Delia and timberyard manager dad John, and her older sister Tiffany and younger brother Jason.
- Elmo Zimmer III - Elmo is the only member of the gang who was not part of the original grouping in the first book, The Ghost of Raven Hill, even though he appears as a character almost from the beginning when he joins Teen Power Inc. to deliver the local paper The Pen. His father, also Elmo Zimmer, is the editor of The Pen, and the first book traces the history of the Zimmer family through to Elmo's grandfather (also Elmo Zimmer and the original editor of The Pen) and the survival of the local paper against the rival Star. Elmo's mother Sarah died when Elmo was very young, and Elmo, following his father and his grandfather before him, dreams of running The Pen when he grows up. Elmo is a quiet and keen boy who is interested in local news.
- Sunny (Alice) Chan - Sunny is Liz's best friend. She is the most athletic out of the gang and is active in gymnastics, yoga and Tae-kwon-do. She lives with her mother and her three sisters Sarah, Amy and Penny. Her eldest sister Cathie, with whom she used to share a room, married her boyfriend Lindsay Shearer in book #29 (The Secret Enemy). Her father Roy Chan is a famous tennis player in America, and divorced Sunny's mother when Sunny was aged four. This forms the basis of much of the storyline in book #5 (Beware the Gingerbread House). Sunny is a calm and practical girl who knows how to get out of tight situations.
- Nick (Nicholas) Kontellis - Nick is the slicked-back cool guy of the group and often acts sarcastic and superior. His father Demetrios, originally from Greece, is a well-off importer-exporter and the Kontellis family live in the wealthier parts of Raven Hill. His mother Toula is very protective of him, as her only child. Nick likes computer games and business, and is usually the member most concerned with the money aspect of each job. He is the brains of the group. He and Tom frequently clash due to their different personalities though they are the best of friends.

=== Other frequent characters ===
- Elmo Zimmer II - Also known as Zim, Elmo Zimmer II is the father of Elmo Zimmer III and owns the local newspaper, The Pen. He is always willing to help Teen Power Inc. out. He was first introduced in the first book, The Ghost of Raven Hill, where he is described as a 'small man with a round face' and 'odd'. After the death of his wife, he bought a Burmese cat, Shadow, for his son Elmo.
- Miss Moss - Christened 'Mossy' by Elmo Zimmer (Elmo Zimmer II's Father/Elmo Zimmer III's Grandfather), she is introduced in The Ghost of Raven Hill as the crabby receptionist at The Pen. After she plays a pivotal role in ensuring The Pens continued survival, she and the gang get along much better. She is a very efficient receptionist and organiser, and as the series progresses, almost becomes a mother figure to Elmo.
- Constable Greta Vortek - Stationed at Raven Hill, Greta is the police officer who appears most throughout the series (although other police officers such as Detective-Constable Crispin and Detective Angela Maroni are mentioned in a couple of books, they do not appear to have much continuity as characters). A great believer in the Teen Power gang, she is reluctant to believe that they have turned to crime in book #30 Dead End, but is forced to face what she thinks is clear evidence.
- Stephen Spiers - Another victim of continuity issues, Stephen is the senior reporter at The Pen throughout the whole series despite taking a job with a rival paper in the first book. He is usually used as a way to introduce information to the reader.
- Ms. Adair - An English teacher at Raven Hill High, she first appears in book #10 Poison Pen and again in book #13 Nowhere to Run. She is one of the more popular teachers at the school and has great respect for the Teen Power gang.
- Mrs. Fenelli - First making her appearance in book #13 Nowhere to Run as a crabby teacher leading a school camp, she makes her second and final showing in book #30 Dead End as the teacher who accuses Teen Power Inc. of spray-painting graffiti onto a building. Particularly in book #30, she is portrayed as a mean, vindictive and unreasonable teacher who refuses to listen to any other person's point of view.
- The Work Demons - A gang of six boys who have copied Teen Power Inc.'s idea of setting up a job agency, they are often used as a source of conflict with the gang. They particularly hate Tom, and the later books narrated by Tom show him frequently scrapping with the Work Demons; a plot point which is also used to some degree of success in book #24 The War of the Work Demons. Led by Bradley Henshaw (who in Beware the Gingerbread house was called Darren Henshaw; this was a continuity error in the original series, although the reprints have Darren and Bradley as separate characters, and brothers), the Demons often leave jobs half finished and incomplete, earning them the nicknames of the "Worst Demons" and the "Work Dumbos" by most of Raven Hill. They often stir up trouble for the Teen Power gang, including an occasion where they once broke into a shop after Teen Power had finished cleaning it to make it dirty and to make it seem like Teen Power had done a bad job.
- The Wolf - A big-time criminal who resides in Raven Hill during the summer. he is a huge, fat man. He causes trouble for the gang for the first time in Beware of the Gingerbread House and reappears numerous times, most notably in Dead End.
- Mrs. Drisk-Haskell - A wealthy, middle-aged widow from one of the oldest and most distinguished families in Raven Hill. She first hires the Teen Power gang in book #10 Poison Pen to clean her house after firing her former cleaning lady, Mrs. Flower, for suspected pilfering. She is impressed by Liz, Elmo, Tom, Sunny and Richelle because they all come from old Raven Hill families, but she is dismissive of Nick, probably because of his nouveau riche background.

== Locations ==
- The Glen - A piece of bushland in Raven Hill Park, this is where the gang hang out and discuss future jobs and mysteries around Raven Hill. It has historical value, as it existed at the time of Elmo's grandfather, but was threatened to be demolished in The Ghost of Raven Hill and Photo Finish.
- The Pen - Raven Hill's local newspaper, The Pen, is owned by Elmo's father. The office provides resources for the gang to work out mysteries and to carry out research, and is sometimes a quiet place for the gang to relax.
- Raven Hill High - Raven Hill's local high school is the place to be for Teen Power Inc., on normal days. The school provides a social setting in which the gang can catch gossip or as a place where the Work Demons get to catch up with the gang.
- Raven Hill Primary - Raven Hill's local primary school. Tom's brothers Jonathon and Adam and Liz's brother Pete attend this school.
- Raven Hill Mall - The local shopping mall provides many employment opportunities (for example, in the books: Fear in Fashion and Beware the Gingerbread House, where the gang are hired by local businesses) as well as a hangout in which the gang can talk or relax.
- The Black Cat Cafe - A café where Teen Power Inc. occasionally meet and have breakfast every Thursday after delivering the Pen.
