= Rowan of Rin =

Book series

- Rowan of Rin (1993); Rowan and the Travellers (1994); Rowan and the Keeper of the Crystal (1996); Rowan and the Zebak (1999); Rowan of the Bukshah (2003)
- Author: Emily Rodda
- Illustrator: Matt Wilson
- Country: Australia
- Genre: Juvenile fiction Fantasy novel
- Publisher: Omnibus Books
- Published: 1993-2003
- Media type: Print (hardcover and paperback) and audio-CD

Rowan of Rin is a series of five children's fantasy novels by an Australian author Emily Rodda. It follows the adventures of a shy village boy, Rowan. The series was first published in Australia in 1993 by Omnibus Books, a corporate division of Scholastic. When Scholastic released Emily Rodda's Star of Deltora fantasy series, the Rowan of Rin series was revealed to be part of the world of Deltora, and the lands mentioned in the books are islands located to the west of Deltora. This makes Rowan of Rin the fourth series set in the world of Deltora, sixth if you count the collective Deltora Quest series as three separate series. The other series are Deltora Quest (Deltora Quest, Deltora Quest 2 and Deltora Quest 3), the Three Doors trilogy and Star of Deltora.

== World ==
The Rowan stories take place in a fictional world, on an island known as Maris. Each book always begins in the small village of Rin, in an isolated valley that rests at the foot of the forbidden Mountain. West of the Mountain is an unnavigable wasteland, and east of Rin lies a river that runs into the sea. On the coast is the larger, more populous city of Maris, home to the fish-like Maris people. Maris is the only point on the coast where ships can land safely, as north and south of Maris the coast is lined by hazardous rocks and steep cliffs. Across the sea, to the east, lies the Land of the Zebak; the Zebak territory is a desert, its city reunited in steel walls and protected from land threats by the desolate, hazard-ridden Wastelands. Further east, across the Silver Sea, lies the continent of Deltora.

== History ==
Long before the time of humans, the bukshah travelled up the Mountain every winter to feast on a grey fungus produced by the ice creepers. The bukshah were sustained for the winter, and the heat from the river of molten gold at Mountain Heart radiated into the ice creepers' cavern, maintaining a balance that controlled the population of the ice creepers and subdued the elemental rage in Mountain Heart. The valley behind the Mountain was eventually settled, and named the Valley of Gold. The people of this Valley learned the secrets of Mountain Heart, and deliberately prevented the bukshah from traveling up there; the fungus, uneaten, caused the river to flow with greater pressure, giving the people of the Valley more gold and riches. However, this also made the ice creepers more populous, causing the first Cold Time. The people eventually allowed the Bukshah to climb the mountain again, and the balance was restored - but they never told their Traveller friends the Mountain's secret. Many years later, the people of the Valley of Gold discovered the mountain berries, but that winter, before the berries completed their life-cycle, the Zebak took a foothold in Maris and messengers were sent to the Valley asking for reinforcements. The people of the Valley left for the coast, but the keeper of the bukshah remained with the keeper of the silks, and soon one warrior returned - the people of the Valley had been captured by the Zebak before they'd even reached the coast. When the Bukshah left the Valley for Mountain Heart, the three companions followed them, hiding in the cave after the beasts had left. As the snow receded, the Mountain berries in the Valley spread, and overnight the abandoned Valley was overrun by the devil trees, transformed into the abhorred Pit of Unrin. The Mountain wall, undermined by the roots of the trees, collapsed, and Mountain Heart was blocked, sealing the companions inside. The people of the Valley of Gold, enslaved by the Zebak, founded the first village of Rin behind the walls of the Zebak city. Above their abandoned home, the companions lay dying and the Bukshah were kept from Mountain Heart, leaving the creepers to breed and multiply.

Hundreds of years later, the Zebak took the strongest of the Rin slaves as warriors to fight against the Travellers and the Maris-folk. The cunning works of the Keeper of the Crystal of Maris led to the Rin slaves turning against their Zebak masters, defeating the invaders. The Rin people then headed west and settled at the foot of the Mountain. Minds wiped by the Zebak, they remained unaware that half of their kinsmen were still enslaved across the sea, keeping their sad history recorded on silk paintings, as the people of the Valley of Gold had done also.

Three hundred years later, the Zebak devise a plan to invade Rin via the air, using flying creatures called grach, then taking the Travellers and Maris-folk by surprise through a land attack. Rowan of Rin travels to the Zebak city to find his sister, and returns with Norris and Shaaran as well, the last two descendants of the original Rin slaves. Shaaran brings the silks with her to the new Rin, causing the leader of the Travellers, Ogden, to suspect that the people of Rin and the people of the Valley of Gold are one and the same. When the cold time hits Rin and the ice creepers come down from the mountain 4 follow the bukshah and go through many challenges before reaching the top where they find more ancient silks from the others that came with the bukshah before them, leading them to the conclusion that the people of the valley of gold and Rin were the one and the same.

== Books in the series ==
- Rowan of Rin (1993)
- Rowan and the Travellers (1996)
- Rowan and the Keeper of the Crystal (1998)
- Rowan and the Zebak (1999)
- Rowan of the Bukshah (titled Rowan and the Ice Creepers in some countries) (2003)

=== Rowan and the Keeper of the Crystal ===
Rowan and his mother must travel to the beaches where the Maris civilisation dwell all in order to choose the next Keeper of the Crystal. Rowan suspects nothing until his mother is poisoned and he must take her place, but Rowan refuses to elect the new Keeper, deciding that he needs the antidote to save his mother. He and the three candidates battling to be the next Keeper must go to find the antidote to save his mother.

=== Rowan and the Zebak ===
Everything seems to be very well and usual in the valley of Rin. But, somehow, Rowan, Perlain and Ogden all sense danger in the land. Rowan knows he must do something, but he doesn't want to disturb the wedding of Jiller, his mom, and Jonn, his step father. Unexpectedly, before the wedding ceremony ended, Annad is snatched by a flying creature known as the Zebak grach. With guilt and despair Rowan sets off for his journey to rescue Annad. Accompanied by his three companions and Sheba's prophecies, Rowan must travel to the land of his ancient enemy - the Zebak. But what if the Zebak find them, and what danger is waiting for them in the land of the Zebak?

=== Rowan of the Bukshah ===
(Retitled to Rowan and the Ice Creepers in North America) An endless winter has begun in the land of Rin. The Rin folk have fled to the Maris and only a few remain in the village, but Rowan must still embark on a deadly quest. He journeys up the mountain in his beloved bukshah's wake to cease the endless frost and ice, but doing so may endanger not only himself, but his loved ones as well.

== Critical reception ==
Rowan of Rin has been praised by critics for its worldbuilding and pacing with Kirkus Reviews stating that Rowan and the Zebak "flows smoothly with threatening episodes paced to keep the plot moving." Another reviewer stated that Rowan and the Travellers was "beautifully constructed." The series was also praised by critics for its "gentle and exciting introduction to traditional fantasy" that is "perfect for any child." However, Rowan and the Travellers was also criticized for its story, with one reviewer stating that "thanks to plenty of heavy hints, readers will have solved the riddle long before Rowan." Rowan of the Bukshah was also criticized for plot conveniences and lack of a sense of danger; however, it was praised for its "genuinely creepy creatures."
