= Catherine Wilkin =

New Zealand actress

- Born: October 1950 (age 75); New Zealand
- Occupation: Actress
- Years active: 1977 – present
- Spouse: Peter McCauley (? - present)

Catherine Wilkin (born October 1950) is a New Zealand actor who has worked in New Zealand and Australia.

== Career ==
Wilkin has acted in many Australian television shows, with a mix of guest and multi-episode recurring roles.

She played the recurring role lawyer Kate McGrath in Cop Shop in 1981. Her then-partner, Bill Stalker, was at that time a regular in the series. In 1983 she played Janice Young in Prisoner. Other roles include Paulyne Grey in Rafferty's Rules, Katherine Jensen in Embassy, Sally Downie in Blue Heelers and Liz Ryan in McLeod's Daughters. Wilkin also starred in the Saddle Club as the well-loved Mrs. Reg, the mother of the owner of the stable, in 2001.

Theatre performances include Miss Prism in The Importance of Being Earnest by Oscar Wilde in 2010 for Auckland Theatre Company. In 2012 she played Linda in the Peach Theatre Company production of Death of a Salesman.

== Personal life ==
She was injured in the November 1981 motorcycle accident that killed her then-partner, actor Bill Stalker.

== Filmography ==
=== Film ===
Year	Title	Role	Type
1996	Brilliant Lies	Marion Lee	Feature film
2013	The Weight of Elephants	Gran	Feature film
2016	The Couple	Wife	Film Short
2017	Theodora	Meredith / Theodora	Film Short
2020	This Town	Grandma Ruth	Feature film, NZ

=== Television ===
Year	Title	Role	Type	Ref
1979	Close to Home	Anne	TV series, 1 episode	
1979	Skyways	Hanna Clayton	TV series, 1 episode: "Hard Case Hanna"	
1980-81; 1982	Cop Shop	Kate McGrath	TV series, 42 episodes	
1982	Home	Maggie	TV series, 2 episodes	
1982	Cop Shop	Kim Lambert	TV series, 2 episodes	
1983	Carson's Law	Mrs. Rosemary Ward	TV series, 2 episodes	
1983	Prisoner	Janice Young	TV series, Season 5, 9 episodes	
1984	Children of the Dog Star	Helen Elliott	TV miniseries, 6 episodes	
1984	The Keepers	Aggie French	TV series, 9 episodes	
1985	The Flying Doctors	Pamela Stoneham	TV miniseries, 2 episodes	
1985	A Fortunate Life	May Prang	TV miniseries, 1 episode: "Journey"	
1986	The Great Bookie Robbery	Carol Power	TV miniseries, 3 episodes	
1987-88	Rafferty's Rules	Pauline Grey	TV series, 46 episodes	
1987	The Flying Doctors	Jessie Logan	TV series, 1 episode: "No Quarter Asked"	
1989	This Man... This Woman	Marion Clarke	TV miniseries, 2 episodes	
1989	The Magistrate	Claire Boyd	TV miniseries, 6 episodes	
1989	Grim Pickings	Kate	TV miniseries, 2 episodes	
1991	Shark in the Park	Catherine Pierce	TV series, 5 episodes	
1992	Embassy	Ambassador Katherine Jenson	TV series, 13 episodes	
	Marlin Bay		TV series	
1993	Snowy	Molly Logan	TV series, Season 1, 13 episodes	
1994	Good Morning Australia	Guest	TV series, 1 episode	
1995	Swimming Lessons	Margaret Sadler	TV movie, NZ	
1996	Brilliant Lies: Interviews	Herself	Short film documentary	
1997	Ocean Girl	Madame President	TV series, 3 episodes	
1997	In the Shadow of King Lear	Herself	Film documentary	
1997	Duggan	Lynette Bridges	TV series, 1 episode: "Death in Paradise"	
1997-1999	Blue Heelers	Sally Downie/Downe	TV series, 14 episodes	
1998	Duggan	Lynette Bridges	TV series, episode: "Sins of the Fathers"	
1998, 2001	Halifax f.p.	Marion Walters	TV film series, 2, episodes, S3 E3: "Afraid Of The Dark", S6 E2: “Playing God”	
1998	The Chosen	Andrea Gordon	TV movie	
1998	State Coroner	Olwen Parsons	TV series, 1 episode: "Sunday in the Country"	
1999	Good Morning Australia	Guest - Herself	TV series, 1 episode	
1999, 2002	The Lost World	Adama, Jessie Challenger	TV series, 2 episodes: "Nectar" & "The Elixir"	
2001-2003	The Saddle Club	Elizabeth Regnery / Mrs. Reg	TV series, Seasons 1–2, 51 episodes	
2001-03, 2004, 2006	McLeod's Daughters	Liz Ryan	TV series, Seasons 1–3, 4 & 6, 26 episodes	
2006	Leo's Pride	Dame Sister Mary Leo	TV movie	
2007	Outrageous Fortune	Sonya	TV series, 1 episode: "The Secret Parts of Fortune"	
2011	Tangiwai: A Love Story	Emma Blair	TV movie	
2016	Wanted	Beverley Delaney	TV series, 1 episode	
2017	The Brokenwood Mysteries	Catherine Alderston	TV series, 1 episode	
2019	Shortland Street	Jean King	TV series, 28 episodes	
2020	Stateless	Elka Werner	TV miniseries, 3 episodes	
2021-24	Under the Vines	Hilary	TV series, 18 episodes	
