= Rowan and the Travellers =

Book by Jennifer Rowe

- Author: Emily Rodda
- Illustrator: Matt Wilson
- Language: English
- Series: Rowan of Rin
- Release number: 2nd in series
- Genre: Fantasy novel
- Publisher: Omnibus Books / Scholastic Australia
- Publication date: 1994 (first released)
- Publication place: Australia
- Media type: Print; Audiobook

Rowan and the Travellers is a fantasy novel written by Australian author Emily Rodda and the second novel in the Rowan of Rin series. The plot follows Rowan and his experience with the Travellers who are suspected of carrying a dangerous sickness that causes the people of Rin to fall into a deep and heavy sleep.

The novel was first published in 1994 by Omnibus Books, an imprint of Scholastic Corporation.

== Plot ==
The book picks up where the first one, Rowan of Rin (novel), ended. Rowan and the Travellers tells the story of a tribe of Travellers which mysteriously arrive in the town of Rin. After their even more mysterious departure, a sleeping sickness appears in Rin and the Travellers are suspected of causing it. Rowan and Allun go to find the Travellers and ask them to stop the sickness. They find the Travellers heading to the horrific Pit of Unrin, where they find that the sickness originally descends from a dangerous kind of fruit called Mountain-berries brought down from the Mountain next to Rin. Its scent lulls people into a deep and heavy sleep. It turns out that the berries are the smaller and infantile form of big trees growing beneath the Mountain itself. Rowan, Allun and the Travellers must save the town with the help of a potion Sheba made of slip-daisy roots.

== Characters ==
=== Rowan of the Bukshah ===
Rowan is a shy and weak boy of the town of Rin, but nevertheless he is the main character and protagonist, as he appears to be very brave when it is needed.

Other than that, he is very strong-minded and intelligent, and can solve riddles easily. He is both clever and warm hearted, but easy to scare away. Strong Jonn is in love with Jiller, Rowan's mother, and Rowan easily spots that each time they meet.

=== Strong Jonn ===
Strong Jonn, as he's called, is one of the strongest but friendliest townspeople, and a man of honesty. But he can get irate. He's a fearless soul, and he's in love with Jiller, Rowan's mother, which Rowan spots easily each time they're together. After the death of Rowan's father Strong John joins Rowan up the Mountain. A strong man yas

=== Allun ===
Allun is the half-Traveller baker of Rin.

Allun was the one who brought down the new and foreign fruit of the Mountain called Mountain-berries. The perfume from the plants puts everyone into a comatose state.

=== Jiller ===
Rowan's mother, and a kindly soul. She's in love with Strong Jonn, who's in love with her as well.
