= Finders Keepers (Rodda novel) =

1990 novel by Emily Rodda

- Author: Emily Rodda
- Illustrator: Noela Young
- Genre: Juvenile fiction Fantasy novel
- Publisher: Omnibus Books
- Publication date: 1990
- Publication place: Australia
- Media type: Print (hardcover and paperback)
- Followed by: The Timekeeper

Finders Keepers is a 1990 science fiction novel by Australian author Emily Rodda. In 1991, it won the Children's Book Council of Australia's Book of the Year for Younger Readers.
