= The Three Doors =

Fantasy novel trilogy by Emily Rodda

- First editions
- The Golden Door; The Silver Door; The Third Door
- Author: Emily Rodda
- Country: Australia
- Language: English
- Genre: Fantasy
- Publisher: Omnibus Books / Scholastic Australia
- Published: 2011 - 2012
- Media type: Print (hardback & paperback); E-book

The Three Doors is a series of three fantasy novels written by Australian author Emily Rodda. The series follows a sixteen-year-old boy named Rye as he journeys through three mysterious doors in search of his missing brothers. The story takes place on an island called Dorne, located in the same ocean as the land of Deltora, the prominent setting in Rodda's Deltora Quest series. The series was first published in 2011 by Omnibus Books, a corporate division of Scholastic Press. It was published in the United States in October, 2012 and a compiled set was published in 2013.

== Plot ==
=== The Golden Door ===
The first novel in the series follows a young boy named Rye who lives in the walled city of Weld, on the island of Dorne. He lives with his mother, Lisbeth, a beekeeper, and his two older brothers: Dirk, a worker that maintains that wall of the city, and Sholto, a solitary individual studying to become a doctor. For years Weld has been attacked by beasts known as 'Skimmers', described as bat-like creatures, they attack in hordes, searching for either human or animal prey. The Warden of Weld offers a reward to any young man who can find and defeat whoever is sending the Skimmers. Dirk is quick to volunteer; however after some time passes he is presumed dead. Sholto then volunteers and in his absence Rye and Lisbeth face financial struggles; they are soon forced to move to the Wardens Keep where shelter is provided to those in need in return for work. They are split up and Rye instead decides to volunteer in search of his brothers, he lies about his age and is given the choice between three magical doors: a golden door, a silver door, and a wooden door. Rye is drawn to the wooden door, but he chooses to go through the golden door as he believes that Dirk would have also chosen it. As Rye is about to leave he is blackmailed by a girl named Sonia to bring her with him through the door, or else she will inform the warden that he lied about his age. Rye reluctantly agrees and he leaves Weld with the girl. They arrive in the 'Fell-zone' where Rye is soon gifted a bag of nine magical objects by the Fellan, an ancient group of magical beings. The pair are later helped by a farmer called FitzFee, who takes them with him to the horse trading town of Fleet, there they meet Faene, who they learn is in a relationship with Dirk. However, Sonia and Faene are suddenly captured by soldiers of a tyrant known as Olt, for a sacrificial ceremony called 'The Gifting'. Rye sets off to rescue them and learns that Dirk has also been captured for The Gifting. During the ceremony, Dirk, Sonia, and Faene are chained to rocks while sea serpents are summoned to kill them. Rye uses his magical objects to rescue them and drives the serpents away. In anger, Olt tries to attack Rye; however, he is instead eaten by a serpent and the reunited companions are able to take back control of the land.

=== The Silver Door ===
The second novel continues directly after the events of The Golden Door. The companions travel back to Weld where they leave Faene in the safety of the keep with the Warden's daughter, Annocki. They then continue their quest through the silver door which Rye believes Sholto would have chosen due to its mysterious aura. They are transported to 'the Saltings', a rocky environment inhabited by flesh-eating snails. They meet a man called Bones, who leads them to Cap, the leader of a group of survivors. They soon learn of a place called the Harbour operated by the mysterious 'Shadow Lord' which they believe to be where the Skimmers come from; they stowaway on a vehicle owned by a trader to shorten their journey to it. However, their plan goes awry when a group of rebels, also hiding in the vehicle, attack them and abandon Dirk, and Rye's bag of magical objects. The rebels take control of the vehicle and head towards a place called 'the Diggings', a mine that uses slave labor, in an attempt to rescue their friends and families that are forced to work there; they also force Rye to help them by threatening to kill Sonia. Rye pretends to be a servant working for the Shadow Lord that was sent to collects the workers; however the plans goes wrong when a real servant of the Shadow Lord, Kyte, arrives. Rye, Sonia, and the rebels are captured and brought to the Harbour, which Rye soon discovers is the source of the Skimmers. At the Harbour they reunite with Sholto, who is secretly trying to destroy the Skimmers while pretending to work for the Shadow Lord. Dirk arrives after being deserted and gives Rye his bag of magical objects, with his powers restored, Rye opens a hole in the wall of the facility that leads to the sea, drowning the Skimmers. The companions and the rebels then make their escape through a vent in the roof and the prisoners of the mine return to their families.

=== The Third Door ===
The companions travel back to Weld through the silver door where they find the Keep in disarray due to increasing Skimmer attacks and they discover that they were not able to kill all of the Skimmers at the Harbour. They decide to journey through the wooden door to finally put a stop to the attacks. They find themselves within the Fell-zone and soon discover the town of Fell End, whose people have also suffered from Skimmer attacks. While gathering information about the town, Rye notices a monster and rushes to fight it; however he is knocked to the ground, and develops amnesia, forgetting his name and who he is. He is taken in by the chief of the town, named Farr. After recovering his memories, Rye is told a story of three brothers, Annoltis, Malverlain, and Eldannen, whose father once ruled the land of Dorne. After their father's death, Malverlain attacked Annoltis and tried to take the throne for himself; however with Eldannen's help, Annoltis was able to defeat him. Together they exiled Malverlain from Dorne, where over time he became the Shadow Lord. As time passed, Annoltis slowly became more wicked, eventually coming to be known as the tyrant Olt; revoted by what Annoltis had become, Eldannen left with his followers to found the city of Weld. With this information Rye realises that the three doors lead to different time periods: the golden door leads to Dorne's past, the silver door leads to Dorne's future, and the wooden door leads to the present. Rye speculates that the three doors must have been created by Eldannen to show the land he left behind, and to show what effect Olt would have on its future. Rye later discovers that the Skimmers live within the wall that surrounds Weld, using his powers and explosives, he destroys the wall and the Skimmers are driven away. The people of Weld celebrate and plan to remove the wall in its entirety, Rye is hailed as a hero and is proclaimed the new Warden of Weld; however he instead chooses Sonia to be leader, and she reveals that she is the Warden's daughter, not Annocki.

== Origin ==
Author Emily Rodda spoke about her inspiration for the series in an interview with Sydney Writers' Centre where she stated that:

I'm very interested in the idea of choices, the choices you make makes such a difference in your life, you could decide to go down one road and you might meet a friend who you'll have all your life, or on the other hand, you might fall over and break a leg and not be able to go into that basketball competition... but there can be much bigger choices than that, and fairytales of course... are full of these sorts of choices, often between— for example, three caskets... you have to choose which one, and the thing that is inside is going to determine your future... I'm very interested in those things... I decided to make my choice between three doors.

Rodda also stated in another interview that while writing The Golden Door she had become "very interested in doors" in the sense that she sees "libraries and bookshops as rooms filled with doors into other worlds and minds"

== Critical reception ==
The Three Doors trilogy received positive reviews from critics, who initially praised the series for its writing, worldbuilding, and subversion of gender stereotypes, with one critic stating that The Golden Door's "concise prose builds strong images of Rye's world and the people and creatures he encounters." The reviewer also praised the characterization of Rye and how his "strengths are hidden and his weaknesses obvious." However, the reviewer also criticized the novel for being "considerably less rich and complex" than other works by Rodda. Another reviewer praised The Golden Door for its "promising urgency" and how it "avoids two-dimensional stereotypes entirely." A critic from the Seattle Post-Intelligencer also commended Rodda's writing, stating that "she manages to put a new spin on the ages old format" and throughout the novel "raises some fairly sophisticated and pertinent social issues."The Golden Door also received criticism for being slow-paced.The Silver Door was praised for its writing, with one review stating that the novel was "full of lively descriptions of wonderfully imagined creatures." The Third Door also received acclaim from Kirkus Reviews, who stated that the novel was "a satisfying finish to a rousing trilogy" and further praised its "richly detailed landscapes... engaging characters" and "surprising twists."

== Awards ==
Accolades awarded to The Three Doors trilogy:

- The Golden Door: 2012 Children's Book of the Year Award: Younger Readers, honour.
- The Golden Door: 2013 KOALA Award Fiction for young readers, winner.
- The Third Door: 2014 KOALA Award Fiction for young readers, honour.
