= Jennifer Rowe =

Australian writer of crime & children's fiction (born 1948)

Jennifer Rowe AC
- Born: 2 April 1948 (age 78); Sydney, New South Wales, Australia
- Other names: Emily Rodda, Mary-Anne Dickinson
- Education: University of Sydney
- Occupation: Author
- Known for: Deltora Quest, Rowan of Rin, Teen Power Inc., Verity Birdwood series, Tessa Vance series
- Website: http://www.emilyrodda.com/

Jennifer June Rowe, AC (born 2 April 1948), is an Australian author. Her crime fiction for adults is published under her own name, while her children's fiction is published under the pseudonyms Emily Rodda and Mary-Anne Dickinson.

She is well known for the children's fantasy series Deltora Quest, Rowan of Rin, Fairy Realm, Teen Power Inc., the Rondo trilogy and The Three Doors trilogy, and her latest His Name Was Walter. Her crime fiction includes the Verity Birdwood and Tessa Vance series.

== Biography ==
Jennifer Rowe was born in Sydney, New South Wales, on 2 April 1948, and raised with two younger brothers in Sydney's North Shore. Her father was Jim Oswin, the founding general manager of ATN7 in Sydney, and was responsible for classic 1960s TV shows such as My Name's McGooley, What's Yours? and The Mavis Bramston Show. She attended Abbotsleigh School for Girls on the Upper North Shore of Sydney. She attained her Masters of Arts in English Literature at the University of Sydney in 1973.

Rowe's first job was assistant editor at Paul Hamlyn publishing. She later worked at Angus and Robertson Publishers, where she remained for fourteen years as editor, senior editor, managing director, deputy publisher and finally publisher. During this time she began writing children's books under the pseudonym Emily Rodda (her grandmother's name). Her first book, Something Special, was published in 1984 and won the Australian Children's Book Council Book of the Year for Younger Readers Award. She went on to win that award a record six times. From 1984 to 1992, Rowe continued her career in publishing, then as editor of the Australian Women's Weekly while writing novels in her 'spare time'. In 1994 Rowe became a full-time writer.

She now divides her working day between consultancies for book publishers and her own writing. She lives in the Blue Mountains in New South Wales with her husband Bob Ryan and her four children. She enjoys reading murder mystery novels, which have inspired her to add mysterious plots and hidden clues to her works.

Rowe's Verity Birdwood murder mysteries for adults, written under her own name are: Grim Pickings (1988) (made into an Australian TV mini-series), Murder by the Book, Death in Store, The Makeover Murders, Stranglehold, and Lamb to the Slaughter. Later she also wrote about Homicide Detective Tessa Vance in Suspect (also published as Deadline) and Something Wicked, and both books were incorporated as episode story lines in the Australian TV-show Murder Call. Rowe also edited a collection of crime stories Love Lies Bleeding and contributed to the 1997 "Crimes for Summer" collection, Moonlight Becomes You. In 2011, after a 13-year absence from crime writing, she released Love, Honour and O'Brien, a humorous mystery which introduced readers to a new sleuth, Holly Love.

=== Emily Rodda ===
The most notable of her children's works, authored under the pseudonym Emily Rodda, are the series Deltora Quest, Teen Power Inc., Fairy Realm, Star of Deltora and Rowan of Rin. The pseudonym is based on her grandmother's name.

The Deltora Quest series has been published in Australia, New Zealand, the United States, Canada, Japan, Italy, Brazil, China, the Czech Republic, Denmark, France, Finland, Germany, Hungary, Indonesia, the Netherlands, Norway, Poland, Portugal, Romania, Russia, Serbia, South Korea, Spain, Sweden, Taiwan, Thailand, Turkey and the United Kingdom, with total worldwide sales across all books in excess of 18 million. A Deltora Quest anime series was broadcast on Japanese television in early 2007.

Among her other successful novels is the 1990 science fiction novel Finders Keepers, which was made into a television series called The Finder, and the Teen Power Inc. series (re-published as The Raven Hill Mysteries), a mystery series involving six teenagers. Both of these are written for young adults.

Rodda's Star of Deltora series is set in the same world as Deltora Quest, The Three Doors and Rowan of Rin, and focuses on a girl, Britta, who wants to be a trader like her father and sail the nine seas. The first book, Shadows of the Master, was released on 1 August 2015, the second book, Two Moons, on 1 November 2015, the third book, The Towers of Illica, on 1 April 2016, and the fourth and final book, The Hungry Isle, on 1 September 2016.

Rodda has written two children's fantasy novels released by HarperCollins Australia: The Shop at Hooper's Bend was released on 7 August 2017, and His Name Was Walter was released on 27 July 2018.

== Awards ==
- 1985 – Children's Book Council of Australia (CBCA): Junior Book of the Year – Something Special
- 1987 – CBCA: Junior Book of the Year – Pigs Might Fly
- 1989 – CBCA: Book of the Year for Younger Readers – The Best-Kept Secret
- 1991 – CBCA: Book of the Year for Younger Readers – Finders Keepers
- 1994 – CBCA: Book of the Year for Younger Readers – Rowan of Rin
- 1995 – The Dromkeen Medal
- 1997 – CBCA: Honour Book for Younger Readers – Rowan and the Keeper of the Crystal
- 1999 – Dymock's Children's Choice Awards: Favourite Australian Younger Reader Book – Rowan of Rin Series
- 2000 – COOL Awards Fiction for Younger Readers Award for Bob The Builder and the Elves
- 2002 – KOALA award (NSW children's choice) – Deltora Quest series
- 2002 – Aurealis Awards: Peter McNamara Convenors' Award – Deltora Quest series
- 2002 – WA Young Reader's Book Awards: Most Popular Book – Deltora Quest – The Forests of Silence
- 2003 – YABBA award (VIC children's choice) – Deltora Quest 2
- 2003 – COOL Awards Fiction for Younger Readers Award for the Deltora Quest 2 series
- 2004 – COOL Awards Fiction for Younger Readers Award for the Deltora Quest 3 series
- 2008 – Aurealis Awards Best Children's Novel for The Wizard of Rondo
- 2012 – Children's Book of the Year Award: Younger Readers, honour, for The Golden Door
- 2013 – KOALA Award Fiction for young readers, winner, for The Golden Door
- 2014 – KOALA Award Fiction for young readers, honour, for The Third Door
- 2018 – The Goodest Prize – The Shop at Hoopers Bend
- 2019 – Companion of the Order of Australia for services to literature
- 2019 – CBCA: Book of the Year for Younger Readers – His Name Was Walter
- 2019 – Prime Minister's Literary Award for Children's literature – His Name Was Walter

== Select bibliography ==
=== Fiction as Jennifer Rowe ===
- Verity Birdwood series (1987–1995)
- Tessa Vance series (1998)
- Angela's Mandrake & Other Feisty Fables (2000) [published in the UK as Fairy Tales for Grown-Ups (2002)]
- Love, Honour and O'Brien (2011)

=== Fiction edited as Jennifer Rowe ===
- Love Lies Bleeding (Allen & Unwin, 1994), anthology of crime short fiction

=== Non-fiction as Jennifer Rowe ===
- The Commonsense International Cookery Book (1978)
- The Best of Women's Weekly Craft (Ed. Jennifer Rowe, 1989)

=== Novels as Emily Rodda ===
- Something Special (1984)
- Pigs might Fly (1986) (also published as The Pigs are flying)
- The Best-kept Secret (1988)
- Finders Keepers (1990) and sequel The Timekeeper (1992)
- Teen Power Inc. series (1994–1999) (re-published as The Raven Hill Mysteries 2006)
- Fairy Realm series (1994–2006) (also published as the Fairy Charm series)
- Rowan of Rin series (1993–2003)
- The Julia Tapes (1999)
- Deltora Quest series (2000–2009) (3 series plus supplementary works. Includes titles also published as Deltora Shadowlands and Dragons of Deltora)
- Dog Tales (2001)
- Squeak Street series (2005)
- Rondo trilogy (2007–2009)
- The Three Doors trilogy (2011–2012)
- Star of Deltora series (2015–2016)
- The Shop at Hoopers Bend (2017)
- His Name Was Walter (2018)
- The Glimme (2019)
- Landovel trilogy (2024)

=== "Early Readers" books as Emily Rodda ===
- Bob the Builder and the Elves, illustrated by Craig Smith (1998) (re-published as Bob and the House Elves)
- Fuzz the Famous Fly, illustrated by Tom Jellet (1999)
- Gobbleguts, illustrated by Stephen Axelsen (2000)
- Bungawitta, illustrated by Craig Smith (2011)

=== Picture Storybooks as Emily Rodda ===
- Power and Glory, illustrated by Geoff Kelly (1994)
- Yay!, illustrated by Craig Smith (1996)
- Game Plan, illustrated by Craig Smith (1998)
- Green Fingers, illustrated by Craig Smith (1998)
- Where Do You Hide Two Elephants?, illustrated by Andrew Mclean (1998)
- The Long Way Home, illustrated by Danny Snell (2001)

=== Film and television ===
- Grim Pickings, television mini series (1989), based on a novel and scripted by Peter Gawler and Graeme Koetsveld.
- Finders Keepers, children's television series (1991–1992)
- Blue Heelers, television police drama (1996)
- Murder Call, television drama (56 episodes, 1997 – 2000) writer and creative consultant
- Deltora Quest anime series for Japanese television (2007)
