= Barde =

Barde is a surname. Notable people with the surname include:

- Abubakar Barde (1938–2002), Governor of Gongola State, Nigeria (1979 to 1983)
- André Barde, the pseudonym of André Bourdonneau (1874–1945), a French writer
- Bidushi Dash Barde (1989–2012), Indian actress and model
- Konrad Barde (1897–1945), general in the Wehrmacht during World War II
- Yakubu Umar Barde, Nigerian politician
- Yeshwant Barde (born 1973), Indian former first-class cricketer
- Yves-Alain Barde FRS, Professor of Neurobiology at Cardiff University
- Idi Barde Gubana (born 1960), Nigerian Karai-Karai politician

== See also ==
- La Barde, commune in the Nouvelle-Aquitaine region in southwestern France
- El Barde District, district of the southwestern Bakool region of Somalia
- Barda (disambiguation)
- Bardeh (disambiguation)
- Bardi (disambiguation)
