= Barda =

Barda or BARDA may refer to:

== Geography ==
- Barda District, a district in Azerbaijan
- Barda, Azerbaijan, a town in Azerbaijan
- Bârda, a village in Malovăț Commune, Mehedinți County, Romania
- Barda, Russia, several rural localities in Russia
- Barda Village, Haryana, a village in India; birthplace of Richhpal Ram, an Indian recipient of the Victoria Cross
- Barda (river), a river in Perm Krai, Russia
- Barda, Purba Medinipur, a census town in Sutahata CD block, Purba Medinipur district, West Bengal, India

== People ==
- Arvīds Bārda (1901–1940), Latvian association football player
- Clive Barda (born 1945), British photographer
- Edvīns Bārda (1900–1947), Latvian association football player and manager
- Elyaniv Barda (born 1981), Israeli association football player
- Franciszek Barda (1880–1964), Polish clergyman
- Fricis Bārda (1880–1919), Latvian poet
- Henri Barda, French classical pianist
- Jean-Pierre Barda (born 1967), Swedish pop singer
- Michal Barda (born 1955), Czech Olympic handball player and coach
- Nissim Barda, Israeli former association football player
- Olaf Barda (1909–1971), Norwegian chess player
- Oskars Bārda, brother of Arvīds, Edvīns, and Rūdolfs Bārda
- Rūdolfs Bārda (1903–1991), Latvian association football and basketball player
- Saidu Barda, Nigerian politician
- Yinon Barda (born 1984), Israeli association football player
- Yngvar Barda (1935–1999), Norwegian chess player

== Other ==
- Barda, alternative name for the Bardi people, an Indigenous Australian people
- Barda, alternative name for the Bardi language, language of the Bardi people
- Barda tribe, one of the scheduled tribes of India
- Barda Wildlife Sanctuary, a wildlife sanctuary in Gujarat, India
- Barda Mausoleum, a mausoleum in Azerbaijan
- Barda, Turkish name of At the Bar, a 2007 Turkish horror movie
- Barda, a fictional character in the Deltora saga
- BARDA, the Biomedical Advanced Research and Development Authority, a U.S. government agency
- ABN Bärdä, Azerbaijani association football club

== See also ==
- Bardas (disambiguation)
- Big Barda, a DC Comics character and member of the New Gods
- Little Barda, a related character to DC's Big Barda
