= Bardeh =

Bardeh (Persian: بارده or برده) may refer to:

- Bardeh, Chaharmahal and Bakhtiari (بارده - Bārdeh)
- Bardeh, Kerman (بارده - Bārdeh)
- Bardeh, Razavi Khorasan (برده - Bardeh)
