= Rūdolfs Bārda =

Latvian footballer (1903–1991)

Personal information
- Date of birth: February 20, 1903
- Place of birth: Riga, Latvia
- Date of death: January 24, 1991 (aged 87)
- Place of death: Riga, Latvia
- Position: Forward

Senior career*
| Years | Team | Apps | (Gls) |
| 1922 | JKS Riga | | |
| 1923–1927 | RFK | | |

International career
| 1923–1925 | Latvia national football team | 7 | (0) |
- * Club domestic league appearances and goals

Rūdolfs Bārda (20 February 1903, Riga – 24 January 1991, Riga) was a Latvian footballer and basketball player and, along with Edvīns Bārda, Arvīds Bārda and Oskars Bārda, one of the four football-playing Bārda brothers.

== Biography ==
Rūdolfs Bārda began his football career in 1922 when he joined JKS Riga – the strongest Latvian football club at the time. His older brothers Arvīds and Edvīns already were playing with the club at that time. After a year with JKS Rūdolfs, Bārda joined the newly founded RFK, together with most of the former first squad JKS Riga players. Playing with RFK from 1923 to 1927 Bārda won three Latvian league titles (1924–1926), from 1923 to 1925 he also played seven matches for Latvia national football team, including the appearance at the 1924 Summer Olympics.

In later years Rūdolfs Bārda switched from playing football to refereeing football matches. He was also a good basketball player and played several matches with the Latvia national basketball team.
