= Bardeh, Razavi Khorasan =

Bardeh برده
- Village
- Location within Iran
- Coordinates: 36°52′09″N 59°43′42″E
- Country: Iran
- Province: Razavi Khorasan
- County: Kalat
- Bakhsh: Zavin
- Rural District: Zavin

Population (2006)
  - Total: 266
- Time zone: UTC+3:30 (IRST)
  - Summer (DST): UTC+4:30 (IRDT)

Bardeh (Persian: برده) is a village in Zavin Rural District, Zavin District, Kalat County, Razavi Khorasan Province, Iran. At the 2006 census, its population was 266, in 62 families.

== See also ==
- List of cities, towns and villages in Razavi Khorasan Province
