= Yakubu Umar Barde =

Nigerian politician

Umar Barde Yakubu

Member of the House of Representatives of Nigeria
- In office 2003–2019

Personal details
- Party: People's Democratic Party (PDP)
- Occupation: Politician

Umar Barde Yakubu is a Nigerian politician. He is the minority whip of the Nigerian House of Representatives.

Umar was elected into office of Nigerian House of Representative in 2003 representing Chikun and Kajuru federal constituency of Kaduna State under the People's Democratic Party of Nigeria.

== Education ==
Umar studied agricultural economics at Ahmadu Bello University and graduated with an MSc.
