= Arvīds Bārda =

Latvian footballer (1901–1940)

Arvīds Bārda (24 November 1901 – 11 November 1940) was a Latvian footballer, and, along with Edvīns Bārda, Rūdolfs Bārda and Oskars Bārda, one of the four football-playing Bārda brothers. He was born and died in Riga.

== Biography ==
Bārda started his football career in 1921 when he along with his brothers joined JKS Riga – the strongest Latvian football club at the time, he played with the side in 1921 and 1922. In early 1923 Bārda joined the newly founded RFK – the leader in Latvian football in the years to follow. Along with his brother Edvīns he was selected to play in the first ever international match for Latvia on 24 September 1922. In total between 1922 and 1924 Arvīds played seven international matches for Latvia, scoring two goals. He was a member of Latvia football team at the 1924 Summer Olympics.

Bārda played with RFK from 1923 to 1926 winning three Latvian league titles. After retiring from playing, he continued to participate in football matches as a referee.

In 1933, Bārda participated in a match of club veterans against the RFK youth squad to celebrate the 10th anniversary of RFK.
