= List of Deltora Quest characters =

The Deltora series features a wide line of characters, both important and minor. The series also features many different monsters and creatures that appeared in all of the many different books. This article is a list of the many different characters and creatures that have appeared in the Deltora series.

== Main characters ==
=== Lief ===
Lief was raised as a blacksmith's son in the run-down city of Del after the invasion. Hot-headed and impatient at the start of the series, all he wanted to do was go out and explore the city. On the night of his sixteenth birthday, he leaves on his father's quest to restore the Belt of Deltora, the only thing that can save their land and the heir from the tyranny of the Shadow Lord. As he is barely 16, his parents chose a companion to travel with him: Barda (whom Lief originally thought to be a beggar), a former palace guard and the son of Jarred and Endon's nursemaid Min. He gains more companions in the Forests of Silence: Jasmine the "wild girl" and her two animal friends. Lief is courageous and very trustworthy. He withstands any and all temptations to surrender his quest. His friends and family gave him more than enough strength to carry on in even the most dire situations. The fact that he was raised with the people of Del and not in isolation makes him a good king to his people. During the quests, he grows not only in bravery, but in wisdom and patience. It is at the end of the original quest for the Belt that Lief learns of his past and that he is the true heir to the throne.

In the second series, Lief is secretive about his task of finding an heir to save his people from the Shadowlands. He and Jasmine both hate the secrecy. He and Doom find his distant cousin Marilen to wear the Belt, while Lief bears a false one made in the forge. In the third book of the second series, it is revealed that Lief is in love with Jasmine.

In the third series, Lief is more himself again: less secretive and more open. During this time, he uncovers a plot to rot Deltora via the "Four Sisters", concocted by the Shadow Lord hundreds of years earlier. He then sets off on another journey to awaken the dragons of Deltora and destroy the Sisters with Jasmine and Barda. At the end of the Dragons of Deltora series, Lief marries Jasmine and has three children named after their parents: Anna, the eldest, and the twins Endon and Jarred.

=== Barda ===
A man of great strength and conviction. Before the Shadow Lord took control of Deltora, Barda was a guard at the palace of Del. His mother Min was a great gossiper and the nursemaid to young Jarred and Endon. Late one night she overheard the Shadow Lord's plot to take control of Deltora. Scared, she told the news to King Endon, who believed she was mistaken and had merely been dreaming. Several hours later she was murdered for what she knew. Fearing for his own life, Barda fled the palace shortly before the Shadow Lord invaded Deltora.

Through the night, Barda stumbled upon what he thought to be Jarred and Anna hurrying the king and queen away. In truth, what he saw was the plan the four friends had hatched in order to keep the heir safe. Endon returned and thinking Barda was a spy, knocked him unconscious. While asleep, Barda rambled aloud his fears and Endon and Sharn realized he was a friend. When he woke up, the Shadow Lord had already invaded. Endon and Sharn told Barda and they enlisted his aid in searching for the lost gems of the Belt of Deltora.

For the next sixteen years, Barda disguised himself as a beggar to discover information vital to the Quest. He became the bodyguard of Endon and Sharn's child Lief, albeit without the semi-arrogant Lief's knowledge thereof. Upon Lief's sixteenth birthday Barda reveals himself to Lief and the quest for the gems of Deltora begins. Though Barda is at first annoyed to travel encumbered by a child, he quickly learns to see Lief as more of a help than a hindrance. Barda's skill in swordsmanship is second to none. His courage and wits have seen his companions and himself through several tight places. He holds a genuine, paternal affection for Lief (and to a lesser degree, Jasmine). His loyalty to his king makes him a good friend, though he can at times grow fierce and defensive.

In Deltora Shadowlands, Barda is appointed as the captain of the palace guards. When Jasmine and Glock journey to the Shadowlands, Barda accompanies Lief to find them. At the end of the series, he marries Lindal and has six children with her.

=== Jasmine ===
Jasmine is a wild girl with emerald eyes who grew up alone in the Forests of Silence. She is described as very small and lightly built, "elfin-faced", with sun-tanned skin and wild, tangled black hair (dark green in the anime). Her parents were captured by Grey Guards when she was seven years old and she was raised by the forest. She can understand the language of the trees and many animals. She possesses great agility and sharp senses, including photographic memory. Fending for herself alone since childhood, she has trouble understanding some social customs. However, she is unable to swim as the Forest only had a shallow stream. Jasmine is usually seen with her raven Kree and a mouse-like creature she calls Filli.

Lief and Barda meet her in the Forests shortly after leaving Del. Jasmine, like Lief, has a quick temper and is very stubborn. She is not quick to trust and has a keen intuition that helps her sense when things are not right. After helping Lief and Barda in the Forests, she is greeted by her mother's spirit from beyond the grave and told to go with Lief and Barda on their quest. After this encounter she joins Lief and Barda in the search for the great gems that will complete the Belt.

Jasmine is later revealed to be the daughter of Endon's childhood friend, Jarred, whom he thought lost forever, later reuniting with her when Jarred regains his memories during the final battle in Series One. As the second and third series progress, Jasmine and Lief fall in love, and at the end of Dragons of Deltora, she eventually marries him and becomes his queen. They also have three children together; Anna, Endon and Jarred, named in honor of their respective parents.

=== Kree ===
Kree is a raven and one of Jasmine's closest companions in the Forest of Silence. His family was taken and eaten by the witch Thaegan. He was rescued by a young Jasmine.

Kree treats Jasmine as his master and does not tolerate offensive behavior towards her. His presence is advantageous towards the three companions - he is able to fly ahead and warn the others of oncoming danger or safety.

When the three enter Thaegan's territory, Jasmine warns Kree to go home lest he meet the same fate as his family. Later, Kree returns and destroys Thaegan by pecking her finger and causing her to bleed. When the three companions' identities become more apparent, Kree and Jasmine are forced to separate from the group: servants of the Shadow Lord are told to find three companions accompanied by a black bird. The group eventually reunites. In the later series he is drugged one evening by Paff, who inserted a tracking device in a wound that Kree received, enabling the Shadow Lord to detect the whereabouts of the companions. However, Jasmine took out the tracking device during the feast while Lief was reading 'The Tale of the Four Sisters'. He helps Lief, Barda, and Jasmine guide around the place when they get lost.

When Lief becomes king, Kree becomes one of the palace's official/personal messenger birds, although he prefers to stick close to Jasmine. Kree also when once attacked and got a scar. In the series, Dragons Of Deltora the Shadow Lord used it as a way to track and spy on Lief, after the crystal was destroyed.

=== Filli ===
Filli is a small, furry gray creature resembling a mouse or ferret (though Jasmine denies that he resembles any rodent). He was rescued by Jasmine when she discovered him paralyzed by the Wenn in the Forests of Silence. As such, he remains close to Jasmine and Kree, often hiding himself in Jasmine's clothing when danger arises. While Filli is often referred to as male in the book series, he is occasionally referred to as female in the anime. Like Kree, Jasmine is able to understand Filli's animal speech. His small size is advantageous to the companions, as he is able to hide easily and eavesdrop on others. Filli was feared and was nearly killed by the people of Noradz, who mistook him for a rat. He is later badly injured by the Orchard Keeper while trying to defend an unconscious Jasmine. In Secrets Of Deltora, it is implied that Filli is a creature called a Siskis.

== Major characters ==
=== Jarred ===
Jarred starts out as a friend of Endon. Endon's evil chief advisor, Prandine, accuses Jarred of treason and Jarred runs for his life. Jarred starts a new life at the forge in Del. He marries Anna and he eventually returns to Endon, only to find the gems of the Belt of Deltora stolen. Jarred and Endon witness Sharn, Endon's wife, throwing Prandine over the tower as Prandine was a servant of the Shadow Lord. After he placed a Resistance symbol under a cave wall he realized he was being followed by Grey Guards so he fled to Kinrest, where a man named Doom lived. The Grey Guards came again: Doom and Jarred fought them, with Jarred being the only survivor. Jarred took the man's name: "Doom", buried him at Kinrest and wrote that Doom would be avenged on his gravestone. Some time later he journeyed to Valley of the Lost and played the Guardian's game to guess his name to win the diamond of the Belt of Deltora. Doom solved the riddle, revealing the name of the Guardian as Endon. Due to this discovery, Doom lost all of his faith in the king and the royal family of Deltora and thus began his lifetime of bitterness and belief that the city of Del's people could only depend on themselves in order to survive. Since he was so shocked and filled with grief from his discovery, Doom left the Valley of the Lost without ever collecting the diamond. However unbeknownst to Doom, the Guardian was only pretending to be Endon on orders from the Shadow Lord to fool those who completed his game since the Shadow Lord found the idea amusing (and to cause anyone who sought to restore the gems to the Belt to lose faith in the king and royal family as Doom had).

Doom eventually became the leader of the Resistance and during a visit to Tom's Shop, he encounters Barda, Lief (Endon's son) and his now slightly older daughter Jasmine. However neither he nor his daughter realize they're related and Jasmine is suspicious of him, however she does somewhat agree with his opinion on the royal family. Doom later competes in the Rithmere Games with the aim of exposing the Games as a means of scouting out great fighters and taking them to the Shadowlands. However he is forced to alter his plans as Barda, Lief and Jasmine are competing as well. Ironically he ends up fighting Jasmine in the final before faking a loss to witness Lief, Barda and Jasmine being captured by Grey Guards. He rescues the three from the Grey Guards. He tells them he has heard rumors about three travelers who seem to be causing the Shadow Lord trouble and offers to take them to a resistance hideout. Barda thanks Doom for the help but declines their offer to join the resistance, stating he did not wish to put the Resistance in danger by helping them in their quest (while keeping the true nature of their quest hidden). Doom is disappointed at their refusal and leaves them with a warning to not speak of their encounter to anyone. Doom later encounters the trio at a Resistance stronghold following their adventure on Dread Mountain, along with an injured Dain who had saved them from two Grade 1 Ols (shapeshifting servants of the Shadow Lord). Doom, angered at discovering they have learned of the Resistance's password system and unsure of their true identity, tests them by putting them in a prison for three days. As three days pass, Doom does not let up and keeps them imprisoned. Dain frees them from the cave in exchange for them to take him to Tora. He later shows up at Tora with Neridah, finding Dain, Barda, Lief and Jasmine. Dain departs with him, while Neridah remains with the trio. Doom later appears in the final book, learning of the Belt and he makes most of the preparations for the gathering of the seven tribes. Dain (believed by Lief to be the heir of the Belt) is kidnapped by Ichabod before Lief could hand over the Belt. Lief, Jasmine, Barda, Doom and the Resistance members head to Del to rescue Dain, but fall into an elaborate trap where the puppet master is revealed to be none other than Dain himself. Doom is the only one to evade capture. Dain is revealed to be a Grade 3 Ol and he has been fooling them all along. After Doom attacks Dain, Lief manages to kill him with the Belt, but Doom sustains an injury to the head, which causes him to regain his memory and reveals to everyone's surprise that he is Jasmine's father. However their reunion is cut short as they are arrested by Grey Guards, save for Lief (who realizes that he was the heir all along) who rescues them and defeats the Shadow Lord.

In the second and third series, it is Doom who remains in charge at the palace whenever Lief, Barda and Jasmine are absent. In the second series he devises the plan to use the false Belt, while in the third, he is suspected of being the guardian of the Sister of the South, though Doom eventually realizes that Paff is responsible. Lief later becomes Jarred's son-in-law after he marries Jasmine and Jasmine gives birth to his three grandchildren: Anna, Endon, and Jarred (his namesake).

=== Endon ===
Endon grew up in the palace of Del with his best friend Jarred. He was unaware of the poverty grasping Deltora, for he lived in luxury. Upon his coronation as King and Jarred's departure from the palace, he did not play a great role in ruling Deltora as the most important decisions were made by his chief adviser, Prandine - a Shadow Lord plant. This combined with his following The Rule - a set of old traditions created by the earliest chief advisers who served the Shadow Lord, resulted with him losing the trust and faith of the people of Deltora before the Shadow Lord finally made his move. Endon escaped the palace with his pregnant wife Sharn and took the identity of his old friend Jarred. He became blacksmith in the city of Del, having been familiar with blacksmith work since his teens. He was a good and quiet man, following the laws of the Shadow Lord and refusing to bring attention to himself or his family. While Lief was questing for the Belt of Deltora, his identity became apparent and both Endon and Sharn were captured and imprisoned in Del in a bid to force Lief to come forward and rescue them. However, Lief was convinced that his parents would not want him to abandon his quest and that the only way to save them was to continue on. In the battle for Del, Endon and Sharn were threatened in a bid to force Lief to show himself. Endon was murdered by Fallow in the battle for Del where Lief became King and overthrew the Shadow Lord.

=== Sharn ===
Sharn was a Toran descendant. She had never spoken to King Endon until the day of their marriage and was chosen by the chief adviser Prandine to marry Endon, because he believed her to be harmless and somewhat dumb, which would help Prandine in murdering Endon. However, he was proven wrong when Sharn cunningly killed Prandine on the day of the Shadow Lord's invasion. She took on Anna's identity and life in order to protect her son, Lief, and the royal bloodline. She lived in the blacksmith forge for sixteen years, living a quiet life and refusing to have the Shadow Lord's attention drawn to her. They did whatever they were told to, so they were not captured and Lief would eventually go on his quest. When Lief's identity became apparent during his quest, Sharn and Endon were captured and imprisoned in Del. Sharn often railed against her tormentors, refusing to give any information on the whereabouts of her son, for all they knew he was dead. She and Endon were both threatened in the Battle of Del, in a bid by Fallow to force Lief to show himself. When the Shadow Lord was defeated, she moved back to the palace, a widow, as Endon had died during the battle. She became the official advisor of King Lief, attending to the needs of the poor and making visits between Del and Tora when Lief was away. She was seriously poisoned in the final book of the series, but then recovered with the aid of the emerald.

=== Anna ===
Anna was living in the blacksmith's forge in Del with her grandfather, Crian, when Jarred stumbled upon their home after running from the palace of Del. Anna and Jarred married and soon Anna became pregnant. However, before she gave birth, she gave up her home and her name to Queen Sharn when the Shadow Lord invaded Deltora and escaped from Del with Jarred. She raised her daughter, Jasmine, in The Forests of Silence until she and Jarred were captured by Grey Guards. She motioned to Jasmine to remain hidden while she was taken by Grey Guards, thus ensuring Jasmine's survival. Anna died in the Shadowlands. Anna appears to Lief, Barda and Jasmine when the topaz is added to the Belt and convinces Jasmine to join them in their quest for the gems of Deltora.

=== Josef ===
Josef was Palace Librarian during the reign of King Alton (Lief's grandfather). He was ordered to burn the Deltora Annals, a written record of Deltora's history, but Josef disagreed with this order. He faked his own death and smuggled the Annals to safety, living in the hidden basement of a pottery in Del and survived on the kindness of the owners of the pottery. He rescued the orphan Ranesh, a street boy and a thief, and educated him. Upon the demise of the pottery owners, they no longer could rely on kindness to survive and Ranesh was forced to steal to feed himself and Josef. Once the Shadowlord is defeated, he reveals himself and the Annals to Lief. He was moved to the palace, where he revealed many Deltoran secrets to Lief, such as the legend of the Pirran Pipe and also Doran's account of the Deltora Dragons. During his time in the palace, he also wrote The Deltora Book of Monsters and Tales of Deltora. Josef becomes Palace Librarian again in the third series and is appointed an assistant, Paff. However, Paff is an evil servant of the Shadow Lord and drugs Josef to acquire information concerning the dragons and the Four Sisters. She also bewitches him to mistrust Doom and tampers with his letters. With books like Monsters of Deltora and the Deltora Annals he is very wise but cannot use his wisdom because he is too old. Josef dies in the third series, as Paff poisons him. However, Josef appears to aid Lief, even in death, as his Tales of Deltora warns Lief of the danger in Hira.

=== Ranesh ===
Ranesh is a street boy, an orphan and a thief from childhood. He worked on a boat during his teenage years, but the boat was captured by pirates. The pirates threw the captain into the Maze of the Beast and forced Ranesh to watch his demise by the Glus. Eventually, Ranesh escaped during a rival crew battle and made his way to Del, encountering Fardeep in the Valley of the Lost, but refusing to play his game because he valued freedom over riches. He was rescued by Josef and taken in as an adoptive son and an assistant. When Marilen arrives in Del, Ranesh falls in love with her, despite the disapproval of Josef, who believes her to be Lief's fiancée. However, once Marilen's identity is revealed, Ranesh moves to Tora and marries Marilen. They have a son, also named Josef. He also later becomes an advisor for Lief. It was later revealed in the Shadowlands that Lief feared about Jasmine's feelings towards Ranesh.

=== Marilen ===
Marilen is a Toran woman, originally believed to be Lief's fiancée. The rumors were encouraged as he brought her to Del in the dead of night, took palace jewels to give to her and gave strict orders that she remain on the upper floors of the palace and that her meals be prepared separately. Her appearance in Lief's life caused a great deal of jealousy for Jasmine, who harbored romantic feelings for Lief. It is later revealed that Marilen is merely a distant cousin on Lief's father's side and was brought to Del to continue the royal line, should Lief die on the quest to free the Deltoran slaves in the Shadowlands. The palace jewels were merely used to create a false Belt of Deltora that Lief would wear, while Marilen would protect the original. Upon Lief's return, Marilen returned to Tora with Ranesh, whom she married and had a son named Josef. Later, she returned to Del with Ranesh and Josef. Marilen became Palace Librarian while Ranesh oversaw palace affairs.

=== Lindal ===
Lindal is a huntress of Broome and descended from cannibal warriors. Lindal is knowledgeable of the wildlife and superstitions of Deltora, as well as experienced in hunting and fighting. She eventually marries Barda and has six children. Many think of her as a man, they are all wrong. She saved Lief, Jasmine and Barda when they were attacked by the Orchard Keeper and took them to Broome, in the book Dragons Nest. She was poisoned by Paff in the final book but recovers with the aid of the emerald.

== Minor characters ==
=== Min ===
Min is Endon and Jarred's nursemaid, and later revealed to be Barda's mother. Jarred and Endon, as boys, thought her to be strict. On the night the Shadow Lord invaded, she overheard a conversation between King Endon's enemies in the palace, and informed him, but he thought she was simply tired and sent her away. When she died in a suspicious accident that very night (presumably arranged or executed by Prandine), he realized she was telling the truth, and had her body moved to the chapel, before contacting Jarred. Her son, Barda, who she had also told, fled the palace after her death as well, believing he might be next. Her death had meaning, as if she hadn't been killed, Endon, Sharn and Barda might not have realized the truth in time to escape to overthrow the Shadow Lord years later.

=== Crian ===
Crian is Anna's maternal grandfather, and the blacksmith of Del before Jarred. He has been taking care of his granddaughter since her parents died when she was young. He repeatedly asked the king for help due to the conditions in Del during his life, but was always ignored due to the machinations of the Chief Advisors, who were the servants of the Shadow Lord. Because of this, he and the people of Del developed a hatred for the king. When Jarred escaped the palace after falsely being accused of attempting to assassinate King Endon, Crian took him in after finding him passed out in front of the forge, and threw his clothes into the sea to trick the guards into thinking him dead. He allowed Jarred to stay, and took on him as an apprentice, but was unmoved when Jarred told him the king didn't know of the conditions in Del due to the Chief Advisor's tricks, simply believing that this showed the king to be a fool. He is mentioned to have died some time during King Endon's reign, after Jarred and Anna married, but before the Shadow Lord took over Deltora.

=== The Giant with Golden Eyes ===
The Giant with Golden Eyes (also known as The Enigmatic Giant, both names that are referred to in the anime version) is a character Barda, Lief and Jasmine encounter in The Lake of Tears. The Giant was originally a large bird that attempted to deceive Thaegan in order to help a friend whose life was in peril. He was enslaved by Thaegan and transformed into a man of enormous stature with tanned skin and a pointed nose and armed with a massive sword and wearing only a loincloth. He is forced to serve Thaegan as guard to a bridge leading directly into her territory. He challenges those who attempt to cross the bridge to answer riddles, allowing only those who are successful in answering to pass and killing any who fail. He may only be freed when "truth and lies become one". His first riddle was directed to Jasmine. He asks her to take eleven sticks and make them nine, without taking any sticks away. Jasmine rearranged the sticks to spell the word "NINE". (In the anime, he asks Jasmine to make five sticks three without taking any away. She rearranges them into the number "3") The second riddle was directed to Barda. The giant asked, "What do beggars have, rich men need and the dead eat?" "Nothing". (In the anime, he asks Barda to arrange five symmetrical shapes "in order". Barda cuts them in half, revealing each half to be one of the numbers one through five.) For Lief's challenge, the giant asked about Thaegan and her thirteen children in their cave. Thaegan gulped her favorite food. Each child had a toad (13), while there were two grubs on each toad (26) and two fleas on each grub (52). He was asked how many living creatures in the cave? These numbers totaled 104 (with Thaegan, 105), but what Lief does not know is that Thaegan's favorite food is a live raven swallowed whole and this raven adds one more (106). Before he kills Lief, the giant asks one more riddle to determine how Lief should die. He asks Lief to make a statement. If the statement is true, the giant will strangle him to death. But if the statement is a lie, the giant will cut his head off. But Lief is clever and makes the statement that his head will be cut off. If the giant does this, the statement will be made true, thus forcing him to strangle Lief instead. But if the giant strangles him, the statement will be made a lie and he must be beheaded. This makes truth and lies one and the curse breaks and he returns to his true form. When Lief nearly falls from the breaking bridge, the bird returns and saves him, paying back his life debt. (In the anime version, he instead saves Lief near the end of the series after Lief falls through the air after Fallow's destruction.)

In the book version the rhyme is:

Thaegan gulps her favorite food
In her cave with all her brood:
Hot, Tot, Jin, Jod,
Fie, Fly, Zan, Zod,
Pik, Snik, Lun, Lod
And the dreaded Ichabod.
Each child holds a slimy toad.
On each toad squirm two fat grubs.
On each grub ride two fleas brave.
How many creatures living in Thaegan's cave?

The rhyme (as a song) in the anime version is:

Sorceress Thaegan gulps her favorite food,
In her cave with all her brood.
And the names of the children are:
Hot, Tot, Jin, Jod,
Fie, Fly, Zan, Zod, Pik, Snik,
Lun, Lod and of course the dreaded Ichabod.
Each child holds a slimy toad.
On each toad squirm two fat grubs.
On each grub ride two fleas brave.
Here is my riddle and so beware.
Answer this riddle now, if you dare.
How many things are living in Thaegan's cave?

=== Manus ===
Manus is a Ralad from the city of Raladin. As a Ralad, Manus is an exceptional musician and architect, as well as bearing the traditional Ralad blue skin, red hair, and black button eyes. Ralads cannot speak, due to a curse placed upon the Ralad people by the witch Thaegan when the Ralads spoke out against her evil. When Kree kills Thaegan, the Ralads regain their ability to speak. He began making his way to Del to plead his case for a better life for the Ralad people. However, he was captured by Jin and Jod, children of Thaegan. He remained their servant for many years, as he was too lean to make a good meal. He finally escaped, only to be captured by Grey Guards. Lief, Barda and Jasmine come across the Guards and rescue Manus when the Guards fall asleep. While Manus rests, they discover the home of Jin and Jod. They are bewitched to believe that it is the home of a gentle elderly couple. Manus rescues the three companions and Jin and Jod are destroyed by their own quicksand trap. Manus leads the three to Raladin, teaching them the ancient Ralad script. They discover the underground city of Raladin and make their way to the Lake of Tears to find the ruby. They encounter the lake creature Soldeen, who wishes to exchange the ruby for Manus, as he enjoys his music. However, when Thaegan is destroyed, Soldeen transforms into Nanion, leader of D'Or, and the Lake of Tears returns to its original state as the city of D'Or. Nanion and Manus become great friends. Manus re-encounters the companions when he comes to Withick Mire with Nanion to represent the Ralads in the ceremony to find the heir of Deltora. He is captured by Grey Guards with the other representatives, but released after the Shadow Lord's defeat. Manus also aids Lief in finding the Sister of the South by expertly examining the old palace blueprints, as the Ralads were the original builders of the royal palace.

=== Nanion ===
Nanion is the leader of the people of D'Or, a golden city founded on the site that eventually became the Lake of Tears. After his people displeased Thaegan, their city was transformed into the lake, he became Soldeen with no memories of his human life, and his people became creatures in the lake. After Thaegan's death, the curse was lifted, and he became an ally of the companions, assisting them in reclaiming the land from the Shadow Lord.

=== Ethena ===
Ethena is Nanion's wife, another leader of the people of D'Or, a golden city founded on the site that eventually became the Lake of Tears. After his people displeased Thaegan, their city was transformed into the lake. While her husband became Soldeen, she was transformed into the Weeping Rock, a statue in the center of the lake that looked like a woman. After Thaegan's death, the curse was lifted, and she gave the Ruby to the companions.

=== Tom ===
Tom is a shopkeeper, brother of Ava, and of Laughing Jack the pirate and nomad. He is a man of business rather than honor and unlike most characters in the series, stands on neutral grounds and will sell to anyone, regardless of allegiance. He claims to be the same person to everyone and that he does not take sides, but assists Barda, Lief and Jasmine on numerous occasions, as well as against his brother, Laughing Jack. Tom is psychically bound to his siblings and is aware when either is in danger or causing danger for others. He also tends to speak in the third-person.

=== Noodle, Zanzee and Pip ===
Noodle, Zanzee and Pip are Muddlets, three-legged creatures with a resemblance to horses that are sometimes used as beasts of burden. They are stored at Tom's shop and bought by Lief, Barda and Jasmine for traveling on their quest, though Tom tells them to take the left hand path when they reach the Broad River. Lief ignores this warning and persuades Barda and Jasmine to take the right hand path, assuming the warning was because Tom didn't think they would willingly go to the City of the Rats. However, when they do, the muddlets bolt and throw them from their backs, and they later wake up in Noradz. The muddlets are later revealed to be owned by the people of Noradz, stored at Tom's shop for the Ra-Kacharz to eventually ride home, and bolted because they caught the scent of home, and Tom claims to them that the companions stole them.

=== Tira ===
Tira is a descendant of the Plains tribe and born under the tyranny of the Ra-Kacharz. Her ancestors were driven from the city of Hira into a new city called Noradz because of a sudden and severe rat infestation. However, the Shadow Lord wanted Hira as a center for the Four Sisters, as it was placed directly in the middle of Deltora. Tira was mortally afraid of the Ra-Kacharz and followed the strict laws of Noradz. However, she helped Lief, Barda and Jasmine escape from their prison. She was taken to the Shadowlands with the other people of Noradz and brainwashed to become a Shadowlord servant. She recovered upon her return to Deltora.

=== Queen Bee ===
The Queen Bee is an elderly, roundish woman. She owns an orchard on the edge of the Hira plain and uses the apples to make Queen Bee Cider, which has energizing properties. She also raises bees to make Queen Bee Honey, which has certain healing properties. She is also the mother of Steven and Nevets. She supplies them with Queen Bee Honey to give to the Resistance. After Lief, Barda and Jasmine escaped the City of the Rats, they stole nine apples from her orchard. Queen Bee was enraged and nearly ordered her bees to sting them to death: but she was abated by Jasmine's money. However, once she realized that they had destroyed the City of the Rats (and by extension, were working against the Shadow Lord), she allowed them to leave and promised to pretend that she had never seen Barda, Lief and Jasmine.

=== Ferdinand ===
Ferdinand is a con artist who pretends to need crutches (presumably to garner sympathy) who plays a game called "Beat the Bird" with people who come to Rithmere to participate in or watch the Rithmere Games. His scam works by setting up a covered table and having a bird spin a wheel similar to a roulette which has spaces which either contain a number, or a bird. One must pay one silver coin to spin the wheel, and if it lands on a number, the player wins that many silver coins, or if it lands on a bird, the player wins a wooden bird. However, under the covered table, there is a pedal connected to the wheel with which he controls where it stops. After the pigeon he was using to do the scam dies, he attempts to buy Kree from Jasmine, but she refuses, though she lets him pay one silver coin to have Kree spin the wheel thirty times. After he has run out of spins, and Lief has noticed most of the people win wooden birds, or at most one or two coins, he attempts to keep Kree anyway, but in the struggle, the cloth falls off and his scam is uncovered, forcing him to flee.

=== Glock ===
Glock is a savage member of the Jalis tribe and one of the last remaining Jalis people. He was knocked unconscious during the great battle between the Jalis tribe and the servants of the Shadow Lord shortly after the Shadow Lord's invasion. He came across Lief, Barda and Jasmine at the Rithmere Games, where he became one of the semi-finalists. He mocked Jasmine's petite size, but before he could fight her, he was secretly drugged by Doom. Upon regaining consciousness, Glock was captured, along with Neridah, by Grey Guards and were taken to the Shadowlands: before they arrived, however, they were rescued by Doom and both decided to join the Resistance. Glock caused great trouble at the Resistance and was eventually moved to Withick Mire, where he took part as a Jalis representative in the ceremony to find the heir of Deltora. He was captured by Grey Guards, but released upon the Shadow Lord's defeat. Glock lived at the palace, where he became a local gossip, gambler and drinker. He takes great pleasure in boasting of his strength, and also in teasing and mocking Jasmine. He forced Jasmine to allow him to accompany her on her quest to find the underground islands of the Pirran people, where they are captured by the Plume tribe to sacrifice to a monstrous creature called The Fear. When Lief and Barda come to rescue Jasmine, they too are captured and the four manage to convince the Plumes to give them a chance to destroy The Fear. The Plumes relented and Glock aided in the destruction of The Fear and died in the process. Before dying, he gave his family talisman to Jasmine and told her she had the heart of a Jalis warrior. Jasmine discovered that one such talisman was in fact the mouthpiece of the Pirran Pipe.

=== Neridah ===
Lief meets Neridah at the Rithmere Games, where she is known as Neridah the Swift. She is deceitful, agile and seeks to merit personal gain from every enterprise. She embarrasses Lief by beating him, but is drugged by Doom before she can compete in the later rounds. She is captured by Grey Guards with Glock, but is rescued by Doom and both decide to join the Resistance. She later meets Lief, Barda and Jasmine again near Tora while accompanying Doom to find Dain. She refuses to return to the Resistance with Doom and Dain. She instead begs Lief, Barda and Jasmine to let her join their group so they can escort her home, as she does not want to return to the Resistance for she holds unrequited feelings for Doom. In reality, she intends to travel to the Valley of the Lost in order to claim the great diamond out of greed. However, Lief, Barda and Jasmine tire greatly of her companionship, as she is complaining and sulky. They eventually sneak off on her early in the morning while she sleeps. To their disbelief, Neridah pursues them and is also challenged to a game for a chance to win the diamond. But she refuses and is allowed to leave, taking advantage to secretly steal the diamond. However, the diamond holds a curse preventing anyone from obtaining it through dishonorable and deceitful means, with Neridah slipping on a smooth rock in the river and knocking her head, drowning in the river. In the anime, Neridah survived and was instead captured by Ocaus before being saved by Lief's group, giving them the diamond.

=== Joanna ===
Joanna is a contestant in the Rithmere Games, and is the wife of another contestant, Orwen. She is bitter over losing the prior contest to Brianne of Lees, who supposedly fled with the prize money. She and her husband make it to the final eight, but during the finals, she is strangled unconscious by Glock, causing Orwen's disqualification when he helps her. By the end of the series, she and Orwen have become the champions of the games.

=== Orwen ===
Orwen is a contestant in the Rithmere Games, and is the husband of another contestant, Joanna. He and his wife make it to the final eight. During the finals, he is pitted against Jasmine, but abandons this fight to help his wife, who is strangled unconscious by Glock, causing his disqualification when he helps her. By the end of the series, he and Joanna have become the champions of the games.

=== Prin ===
Prin is a young and sweet-tempered female Kin. Kin are large, mammalian, winged creatures that when sleeping, resemble rocks. Deltoran children (a notable example being Lief) sometimes have stuffed animal versions. When Prin is first introduced, she is of a childish temperament, but later shows character development as she helps Barda, Lief and Jasmine retrieve the emerald for the Belt of Deltora by saving them from a Vraal. Because of her youth, she often jumps into adventure without thinking of the consequences. Prin later aids Lief, Barda and Jasmine on their journey to the Isle of the Dead by flying Lief out of the emerald territory and escaping the emerald dragon.

=== Ailsa, Bruna and Merin ===
Ailsa, Bruna and Merin are three female Kin who fly Lief, Barda and Jasmine to Dread Mountain after they help save Prin from Grey Guards. Ailsa does so because she is adventurous, Merin because she is homesick and Bruna because she believes the Kin owe the companions for helping Prin. They later aid the companions on their journey to the Isle of the Dead by flying them out of emerald territory to Tora, alongside Prin.

=== Crenn ===
Crenn is an elderly male Kin, who appears to be the leader of the colony at Kinrest. He tells the story of the Kin to the companions after they rescue Prin, and along with the others, returns to Dread Mountain after Gellick is defeated.

=== Fa-Glin ===
Fa-Glin is the leader of the Dread Gnomes and is a proud wise leader. Fa-Glin along with all the other Gnomes accepts Gellick's offer to rule Dread Mountain and is made a slave to him. Fa-Glin being a Dread Gnome is very suspicious and sends messages in code to Barda, Lief and Jasmine.

=== Gla-Thon ===
Gla-Thon belongs to the Dread Gnomes tribe and as such, is a proud and honorable archer. She meets Lief, Barda and Jasmine when they are captured by the Dread Gnomes and agrees to assist them in destroying the evil toad that lords over the Gnomes. As such, the Gnomes are freed from their slavery and owe a great debt to Lief. Gla-Thon and the Gnomes give the three friends an arrow-head and make them promise to send word in times of need. Gla-Thon represents the Dread Gnomes in the ceremony to find the heir of Deltora and as such, is captured by Grey Guards. She is released after the Shadow Lord is defeated and maintains a good relationship with Barda, Lief and Jasmine. Gla-Thon returns to Del in the third series to ask for food sources for the Gnomes. However, she is forced to remain in Del as part of the lockdown in resistance of the poison epidemic. She aids Lief in searching for the fourth Sister.

=== Pi-Ban ===
Pi-Ban is a Dread Gnome who was taken to the Shadowlands as a prisoner. He later joined the Resistance there, but was captured and was to be used for the Conversion Project when he was found by Lief, Barda and Jasmine. He and the companions are rescued from the Shadowlands after Emlis plays the Pipe, and he is sent up to Dread Mountain by the Pirran magic, though he also will not remember the caverns due to the waters making him forget.

=== Steven/Nevets ===
Steven is a peddler whom Barda, Lief and Jasmine encounter on their journey. He is cheerful and pleasant, and constantly singing. His mother is Queen Bee herself and he supplies Queen Bee products to the Resistance. Lief at first worries about Steven travelling alone in such dangerous times, but he is told that Steven is safe without companions, as he is accompanied by his brother, Nevets. The two grew up on the plain in the territory of the opal. Steven acts as a representative of the Plains tribe in the ceremony to find the heir of Deltora and also takes Lief, Barda and Jasmine to Del, believing that a spy is in their midst. Following Lief's coronation as king of Deltora, he remains a close associate and friend. He brings them news from all over Deltora. Nevets is 'Steven' spelled backwards. He is a great, golden giant living within Steven and appears whenever Steven, or someone close to him, is threatened but does not distinguish between friend or foe. Steven often has great trouble controlling his brother, though he lets him free on several occasions. Nevets has been useful in several occasions, such as protecting Josef from Ols and killing Grey Guards that threaten Steven, Lief, Barda and Jasmine, as well as helping to defeat Paff's black slime monster when it overwhelms the topaz dragon.

=== Chett ===
Chett is a polypan that Lief, Barda and Jasmine meet on a cruise ship. Polypans are known to be very skilled thieves and pickpockets. It is said that those who have polypans in their service are usually up to no good. Chett served the captain of the River Queen by doing smaller chores and by using the rowboat to pick up potential customers. During a pirate raid, Chett escapes with the pirates aboard their own ship in a fit of panic after shape-shifting Ols appear. Afterwards, when Lief, Barda and Jasmine are captured by the pirates, Chett aids them by stealing back the Belt of Deltora in exchange for Lief's chewing tobacco-like gum. Lief, Barda and Jasmine meet Chett again while attempting to rescue Dain from their pirate captors. A fight broke out between crew members and in a state of panic, Chett tossed a lantern into the storage area where the pirates kept a great deal of flammable materials (such as paint and oil), causing the pirates' ship to catch fire. Chett helped Dain escape from the ship and then rowed the group's boat back to shore, before fleeing into the wilderness.

=== Lockie the Stripe ===
Lockie the Stripe is an entertainer on the same cruise ship Chett works on. He plays a music box for travelers. After Chett flees with the pirates, the captain has Lockie take over rowing passengers to and from the ship, and has him drop Lief and Jasmine off on the shore, as they are targeted by Ols.

=== Zeean ===
Zeean is a wise, old Toran leader who assists Lief on several occasions in repayment for releasing her tribe from The Valley of the Lost and holds significant standing in the Toran community. She represents the Torans in the ceremony to find the lost heir of Deltora. In the third series, Zeean is poisoned along with Sharn by Paff, but survives.

=== Kris, Peel and Lauran ===
Kris, Peel and Lauran are Torans who look vaguely like Lief, Barda and Jasmine, who after all the gems in the belt are found, agree to pose as them to misdirect the Shadow Lord.

=== Jinks ===
Jinks was an acrobat and entertainer for the royal family in the castle of Del and knew Barda as a boy. However, he fled the castle with the other entertainers upon the Shadow Lord's invasion and joined the Resistance. Upon Lief's coronation, he assumedly worked his way into favor with the castle officials, for he is found spending time in the castle at the beginning of the second series. Jinks is a selfish man, a gambler, a sook, and lusts for riches. He betrayed Lief and Barda, leaving them to be killed at the hands of the Granous and then lied about their deaths upon his return to Del. However, he guessed that either Lief or Barda would survive and kill him, or else the Shadow Lord would invade in Lief's absence and he decided to flee the castle. His lust for riches proved fatal, for he broke into Marilen's room and searched for her items of wealth. He ate a poisoned cake intended for Marilen and was found dead by Sharn and Marilen.

=== Amarantz ===
Amarantz was a former resident of the pottery, who was taken to the Shadowlands. She later returned to the palace as a cook, seemingly beaten deaf. She is later revealed to have been an early success of the Conversion Project, but not a perfect one, as the possession caused her to lose her hearing. While possessed, she tried to kill Marilen with a poisoned cake, but Marilen, wearing the belt of Deltora, noticed the trick, though Jinks died in it instead. When exposed, she killed herself with a poisoned cake, and after the worm left her dying body, she was able to hear again in her final moments.

=== Moss ===
Moss was a palace guard in the time of King Endon. He was taken to the Shadowlands when the Shadow Lord took over, but escaped and joined Claw's resistance. He was later captured and sent back to Deltora, infected with a worm from the Conversion Project which left him unable to walk without crutches. Under its possession, he attempted to strangle Lief, but failed and was stabbed in the back, presumably by another Conversion Project subject, possibly Pieter.

=== Pieter ===
Pieter was a roof mender in Del at the time the Shadow Lord took over, and was taken to the Shadowlands. He escaped captivity and joined Claw's resistance, but was later captured and sent back to Deltora, infected with a worm from the Conversion Project which left him suffering from constant headaches. He attempted to kill Lief by leaving a Plains scorpion in his bed, entering through the window, but this failed, and he later died when two more scorpions escaped from a box he hid beneath his shirt.

=== Mobley ===
Mobley is a member of the resistance under Doom. He reports Pieter's death to Sharn, as well as his suspicions that Pieter was behind the assassination attempt on Lief's life.

=== Maria ===
The sister of Pieter, who was separated from her brother when the Shadow Lord took over. After the Shadow Lord was driven out, Maria found work at the palace and was eventually reunited with Pieter when he returned. After Pieter's death, she wondered why he would try to kill the king, as she recognized his handwriting on a message on his body saying "the king must die".

=== Flash and Fury ===
Flash and Fury are fighting spiders, usually gambled by their two owners. Each spider grows as large as a plate and obsesses over fighting. A losing spider may force their opponent to fight to achieve vengeance. Flash (a male) belonged to Glock and Fury (female) belonged to Jinks. In their first fight, Flash defeated Fury. A caged Fury raged for days, giving Jinks no peace. When Jasmine and Glock disappeared, Lief and Barda used Fury to find them, as Glock had taken Flash with them. When Glock died and Jinks ran away, Lief, Barda and Jasmine were resigned to bringing Flash and Fury with them, as the Plume tribe (of whose island they were staying on) refused to allow the spiders to stay. When the friends reached the Island of Auron (otherwise known as the Isle of Illusion), they were attacked by Arach. Flash and Fury realized that they had an even greater enemy that they could not defeat and the two put aside their differences and took to wrestling only in play. When Lief, Barda and Jasmine obtained the second piece of the Pirran Pipe, they left the two spiders under the care of the Auron History-Keeper Penn, who had grown quite fond of the creatures.

=== Penn ===
Penn is the History-Keeper of the Auron tribe and as such, records every piece of history that takes place on the rafts where the Aurons live. She becomes Lief, Barda and Jasmine's guide and gives them information concerning the Isle of Illusion and the history of the Aurons. Like the rest of her race, she detests lying, but was bidden by the Aurons' Piper to hold back certain information about the Aurons' history. Lief, Barda and Jasmine leave the fighting spiders Flash and Fury in her care upon leaving the Aurons. Penn has two "companions", Tresk and Mesk, sea-horse like creatures that she loves dearly.

=== Tresk and Mesk ===
Sea horses owned by Penn.

=== Emlis ===
A young Pirran from the Pirran island of Keras that helps Lief in the Shadowlands. Emlis plays the Pirran Pipe in the Shadowlands. Once they return, he tells them he will adventure into the seas that are unknown.

=== Claw ===
A man from Del who was captured in the raids. He escaped from the Shadow Lord after being mutated into a fighting beast with talons, hence the name Claw. His real name is Mikal. He was a Resistance fighter in the Shadowlands.

=== Gers ===
The younger brother of Glock and is in many ways like him such as his looks. However, Gers is somewhat more subdued and less confrontational than his brother, most likely because of the harsh ordeals he had to suffer in his life. Gers became one of the many Deltorans held prisoner in the Shadowlands. He escaped the Shadow Arena and made it to a branch of the Deltoran Resistance, led by Claw. He became the leader of the remaining Jalis after being entrusted Glock's talisman (consisting mainly of little odds and ends that his ancestors had gathered as trophies, formerly including the mouth piece of the Pirran Pipe).

=== Brianne ===
Brianne of Lees is a former champion of the Rithmere Games who was captured by Grey Guards and taken to the Shadowlands to fight in the arena. She was the third to escape it, after Doom and Gers, and joined the Resistance in the Shadowlands, led by Claw. She and the others were later rescued by the Pirrans after Emlis played the Pirran Pipe, and sent back to Del.

=== Hellena ===
Hellena is a Resistance fighter in the Shadowlands, who was captured by the Shadow Lord and made into one of the subjects of the Conversion Project. Controlled by one of the worms, she was later freed and returned to Deltora.

=== Honey, Bella and Swift ===
Honey is a golden mare with a white mane and tail, Bella is a chestnut mare, and Swift is a small coal-black mare. They are ridden by Lief, Barda and Jasmine, respectively, on their quest to destroy the Four Sisters. They are sent with the guards and their horses to throw off an assassin while the companions take a different route, but escape after the assassin kills the guards instead. They somehow end up in the possession of Laughing Jack, who turns them into large black horses like the one he already has, and forces them to help the transformed Red Han pull his wagon while abusing them, including denying them food and water. After Laughing Jack's death, the spell is broken and they are restored to their normal shapes and reunited with Lief, Barda and Jasmine, and take them the rest of the way back to Del. It is revealed that Jasmine recognized them the first time they encountered Laughing Jack despite the spell on them.

=== Mellow ===
Steven's horse, who pulls his cart. She is devoted to Steven and Nevets, and they return this loyalty. In the third series it is revealed that she can, after consuming Queen Bee Cider, summon a swarm of bees to carry the entire cart, though she cannot do this frequently. It is also possible that she can understand Steven to an extent, as she seemingly understood what he said to her before giving her the cider.

=== Iris, Paulie and Jack ===
Iris and Paulie are bootmakers in the city of Del, and Jack is their infant son. Iris questions the presence of the Shadow Lord in Del (through the crystal), which prompts Lief to tell the people how he plans to destroy it.

=== Brid ===
Brid is a guard who was formerly a prisoner in the Shadowlands. After being brought back to Deltora he became a palace guard, and traveled with the companions to destroy the Sisters. However, after Lief, Barda and Jasmine split off from the rest, the troop is attacked by the false ruby dragon, who kills them all. However, Brid survived long enough to leave a message in his own blood directing Lindal to Lief, Barda and Jasmine's location.

=== Nirrin ===
Nirrin is a guard who, along with his wife, was formerly a prisoner in the Shadowlands. After being brought back to Deltora he became a palace guard. He was one of six guards helped carry the crystal to be destroyed in the forge and remembered the look in Lief's eyes when they did so.

=== Corris ===
Corris was the deputy captain of the palace guard under Barda. He was left in charge of the guard when Lief, Barda and Jasmine underwent the quest to destroy the Four Sisters, but died when the "Toran Plague" came to the palace and was replaced by his less effective second-in-command, Dunn.

=== Dunn ===
Dunn is a palace guard under Barda, who assumed command after the acting leader in Barda's absence seemingly died of a plague while Barda was away. He is not a particularly good leader, and is somewhat gullible, with Barda commenting that he will need to be replaced.

=== Zon, Delta, Airlie and Wax ===
Palace guards under Barda who were killed seemingly of the plague, though their deaths occurred after the plague was deemed to actually be poison. Airlie and Wax were guarding the palace gates the night the Black Mist first appeared in physical form, while Zon and Delta were guarding the messenger bird aviary when they died (all were actually suffocated by the black slime).

=== Jarvis ===
The keeper of the messenger birds at the palace, suffocated by the black slime.

=== Blackwing ===
A blackbird trained as a messenger bird for the palace. Poisoned by Paff, but survived due to Lief using the emerald.

=== Ebony ===
A blackbird trained as a messenger bird for the palace, and at some points used by Zeean.

=== The Masked Ones ===
The Masked Ones are a group of wandering nomads and performers (similar to a circus troupe). It was founded long ago by King Elstred's brother, Ballum, after he had been expelled from the palace. (It is possible that Ballum and Elstred are half-brothers because in the last book of the second series, it is said that Adin's heir only had one child.) Lief, Barda and Jasmine join the group after a misunderstanding when a man from their group, Otto, is killed by one of the Masked One's phantoms. They are very strict and are distrustful towards newcomers into their group. They also have a deep hatred towards the kings of Deltora for the fact that Ballum, their founder, was driven from his palace by deceit from Elstred's advisor Agra (a servant of the Shadow Lord) and so Lief and his friends are forced to take fake names for themselves to disguise themselves. The masks they make have magical attributes, when a member of the troupe reaches adulthood, they are given a magically crafted mask that merges and becomes part of the wearer's face. These "Masks of Adulthood" also make the wearer have absolute loyalty to the Masked Ones, making them think and feel like them.

==== Bess ====
An inner circle Masked One and Bede's mother. She is superstitious and believes many incidents to be omens. Her mask is that of an owl. When the trio of Barda, Lief and Jasmine travel with the Masked Ones, she says that Lewin (Lief) looks a lot like her son, because the inner circle is descended from Ballum, King Elstred's brother, who was expelled by Elstred's chief advisor. Lief is a descendant of Elstred. (It is possible that Ballum and Elstred are half-brothers because in the last book of the second series, it is said that Adin's heir only had one child.) When "Lewin" says that his first loyalty must be to "Berry" (Barda), his and "Jay's" (Jasmine's) supposed uncle, and that "Berry" wanted to move west, Bess attempted to intervene. She requested that Lief at least wear Bede's Mask of Adulthood for at least one hour (so that it would become part of him and therefore he would never want to leave) and tried to poison Barda, but Kree saw to it that she drank her own poison.

==== Bede ====
A former wandering stage-actor, member of the outlaw entertainers known as the Masked Ones. Bede resembles Lief in appearance, because of their mutual ancestry. The Masked Ones were founded by Ballum, the brother of King Elstred and the first leader of the Masked Ones. (It is possible that Ballum and Elstred are half-brothers because in the last book of the second series, it is said that Adin's heir only had one child.) He had a beautiful singing voice that many of Deltora's women fell in love with, although the feeling wasn't always mutual. He wore a mask of a bird. When the Masked Ones came to Shadowgate, he became the heartthrob of Kirsten but then at last fell in love with Kirsten's sister, Mariette. They both wandered into the mountains and were never seen again. It was then revealed that Kirsten had captured Bede and made him her slave. Fortunately, Lief and the emerald dragon destroyed the Sister of the North, thus Bede and Mariette were saved.

==== Rust ====
A suspicious member of the inner circle Masked Ones. She wears the mask of a fox. She also controls the moths that guard the camp by a high pitched shriek. She seems to dislike the fact that Barda, Lief and Jasmine have joined the Masked Ones and wishes to expel them from the group and becomes delighted that they chose to leave on their own free will.

==== Zerry ====
A thieving young Masked One, student of Plug, and orphan from the Mere tribe. He steals the Belt of Deltora, but Steven/Nevets, Lief and Jasmine manage to get it back. Later, Steven takes Zerry as an assistant. When Jasmine and Lief get married, he became the stable master's chief assistant. As a Masked One, he wears a polypan mask.

==== Otto ====
An inner circle Masked One who is killed by the Masked One, probably in mistake for Barda. Otto wears a mask shaped like the face of a Wild Pig, which like all the inner circle's masks is bonded into his skin by the contraction of the boiled roots from which it is made.

==== Fern ====
Laughing Jack's servant. She was once in the Shadowlands, where she was branded with the Shadow Lord's mark, and she and her husband joined the Masked Ones after being brought back to Deltora. She is a "bareface hanger-on" of the Masked Ones, who sometimes wears a cat mask. She is then killed by the Masked One, presumably in mistake for Jasmine.

==== Plug ====
A female member of the inner circle Masked Ones who wears a frog mask and looks after the orphans.

==== Quill ====
A male member of the inner circle Masked ones who wears the mask of an eagle.

==== Neelie ====
An orphan taken in by the Masked Ones who wears a shapeless furry mask. She was to receive her mask of adulthood, which she had requested to be a waterbird.

==== Lin ====
An orphan taken in by the Masked Ones who wears a shapeless furry mask, and was a friend of Neelie.

=== Mariette ===
Mariette lived in the village of Shadowgate with her parents and older sister, Kirsten. When the travelling Masked Ones came to Shadowgate to perform for the villagers, Mariette fell in love with their singer, Bede, who in turn also fell in love with her. This enraged Kirsten and she captured them both and imprisoned Mariette in her locket. The Masked Ones believed that Mariette had convinced Bede to run away together and hated Mariette and labelled her a "despicable bareface". Kirsten was killed and the Sister of the North destroyed and both Mariette and Bede were freed.

=== Ava ===
A fortune teller who owns a shop near the western coast of Deltora. She is the sister of Tom and Laughing Jack. She sells things such as potions and cures. She has boats for hire and like Tom, she offers a free gift to every customer. At the beginning of The Sister of The South, she tells Lief that she can see creeping darkness in his future. This may have been intended as a joke, as Ava is blind. However, creeping darkness does appear in Lief's future, in the form of black slime which Paff uses to murder people such as palace guards.

=== Red Han ===
Red Han was the Lighthouse-keeper at Bone Point, near Tora. He was cheated, black-mailed and eventually transformed into a large black horse by the Shadow Lord servant, James Gant (also known as Laughing Jack). He was rescued many years later by Jasmine and returned to be keeper of Bone Point.

=== Verity ===
Verity was the daughter of Red Han and a painter. She was born in Bone Point Lighthouse and as such, developed magical powers, which she expressed while held hostage on Laughing Jack's ship. Laughing Jack referred to her as "The Witch". She was murdered by Laughing Jack when Red Han refused to pass over the keys to Bone Point. After her death, her body was turned to wood and fused into the ship. She left behind a painting that had 7 errors in it. If you could find them all, you would be freed from the ship. When Laughing Jack was captured by his crew, the wooden frame that was Verity disappeared, allowing her to rest in peace.

=== Tirral ===
Tirral is the leader of the Keras tribe underneath Deltora in the emerald territory. She was the first to play the restored Pirran Pipe after Lief, Barda and Jasmine put it together after gaining her piece. Her son, Emlis followed Lief, Barda and Jasmine into the Shadowlands, a fact that she was very angry at for some time. She and her people helped to save The Shadowland prisoners after hearing the music of the Pirran Pipe.

=== Nols ===
Nols is a member of the Plume tribe underneath Deltora and eagerly encouraged Lief, Jasmine, Barda and Glock to fight The Fear, after they offered. She hated the Plume leader, Worron, for being a tyrant and a coward and so she took his place as Piper after gaining the trust of the Plumes. When The Fear was destroyed, she willingly gave Lief, Jasmine and Barda the mouthpiece of the Pirrin Pipe and buried the dead Glock with the leaders of the Plume.

=== Worron ===
Previous leader of the Plume tribe, underneath Deltora. He was cast out of leadership by Nols, a decision that allowed the Fear to be killed and Lief, Barda and Jasmine to continue to the island of Auron.

=== Clef and Azan ===
Two hunters on the island of Plume. They saved Lief and Barda when they were drowning and later warned them against going to the island of Auron and later attempted to sacrifice them to save the people of Plume for four years, an idea that their leader, Worron, disliked.

=== The Piper of Auron ===
Commonly referred to as "The Piper," The Piper of Auron is the leader of the Auron tribe. He forced Penn to deceive Lief, Jasmine and Barda and used the trio as a tool to destroy the dome around the island of Auron and save his people. While journeying to the Island of Auron (also referred to as "The Isle of Illusion"), Lief, Barda and Jasmine suspected he was going to help them get his piece of the Pirran Pipe and then murder them and keep both his piece and their own, for himself. It turned out he wanted no such thing and gave them the stem of the Pirran Pipe after they had reclaimed his island for him.

=== Auris ===
Auris is the leader of the Auron tribe who chose to stay in the dome surrounding the island of Auron and believe in the illusions of Pirra. He is later revealed to be the only person still alive in the dome due to everyone else having failed to believe in the illusion. After the disbelief of the companions damages the dome badly enough for the light to return to the caverns and to allow the Arach into the dome, he holds the remainder in place until the Arach kill him, at which point the dome completely disappears.

=== The Pirran flute players ===
The Pirran flute players were formidable flute players who stood up when the original Piper, the chief of the Pirrans, died. They played on turn and the Pirran people voted for their favorite, but they always got equal sums of votes as they tried to take her place.

==== The Original Piper ====
The original piper died in her sleep and three new ones (Plume the Brave, Auron the Fair, and Keras the Unknown) came from afar to take her place.

==== Plume the Brave ====
Plume the Brave was one of the three pipers that took the place of the one who had died during her sleep. He played music so stirring that his audience cheered.

==== Auron the Fair ====
Auron the Fair played the pipe so wonderfully that her audience wept.

==== Keras the Unknown ====
Keras, one of the three, made sounds so haunting that the audience was rapt in wonder.

== Monsters of Deltora ==
=== The Great Beast ===
Before the Shadow Lord came to Deltora, he came upon an island inhabited by the four sisters whom he murdered out hatred for their singing. However, the Shadow Lord learned too late that the song was a lullaby for an enormous horned monster that slept beneath the surface of the island. With the sisters' singing ceased, Great Beast awakened and emerged in a violent rage which forced the Shadow Lord to flee as the island sank from the monster's rampage. This event inspired the Shadow Lord to later create the Grey Tide and the Four Sisters.

=== The Wennbar and the Wenn ===
The Wennbar is a large predator who lives in the forest of silence first wood (something that is like a carnivorous Apatosaurus) who exerts authority over a tribe of creatures called the Wenn. The Wenn are smaller creatures with pale skin and have no head or neck, but have a pair of stalks with red eyes at the top coming from their shoulders. The Wenn live in their territory called Wenn Del. These Wenn worship the Wennbar as a deity, offering it gifts of live prey which they have captured. Although they are small, Wenn are capable of subduing large prey by means of a sound they produce by rubbing their lower legs (similar to crickets), which drives animals to the point of insanity. They then sting and paralyze their victims and offer them as sacrifices to the Wennbar. If the Wennbar is not fed, it is enraged and will eat its worshippers. The Wennbar's neck can extend long and to high places. The Wennbar moves slowly but can move at a fast rate when angry or hungry. Jasmine tells Lief and Barda in The Forests of Silence that Wenn feed on the scraps left behind by the Wennbar, but The Deltora Book of Monsters claims they are herbivores, eating only certain kinds of leaves. It is believed that every hundred years, the present Wennbar is bathed in special oils by the Wenn and dies in its sleep while giving birth to several young. These young fight over the body of their dead parent and the surviving victor becomes the new tyrant over the Wenn.

=== Muddlets ===
Muddlets are bizarre, albeit rare, gentle, and highly valued, beasts of burden who supposedly exist in central Deltora, around the area near the City of Rats, which have been domesticated by the plains people for millennia. They resemble zebras (though they are splodged, not striped) crossed with gazelles and some type of herbivorous dinosaur. They have three legs and long, droopy, rabbit-like ears. In City of the Rats, Lief, Barda, and Jasmine are sold three Muddlets (Zanzee, Noodle and Pip) as mounts by the eccentric shopkeeper named Tom. Apparently, they were only being stabled there and were not Tom's to sell. They truly belonged to the people of the city of Noradz. This results in, when the heroes pass Noradz, the Muddlets bolting (due to excitement at catching the scent of home), and the heroes ending up in the clutches of the Ra-Kacharz. The three muddlets are returned to their herd and neither them nor any other Muddlets are featured or mentioned for the rest of the series, although Barda says, "I'm so hungry I could eat a muddlet!" in one episode, where the trio arrive at the City of Rats.

=== Terreocti ===
Known more commonly as Sand beasts, they are insectoid animals native to the Shifting Sands, resembling a praying mantis with the legs of a spider. In the anime, the adult Terrecti are enormous (roughly around the same size as a large dinosaur) and are cycloptic. An apex predator within the Shifting Sands, with no natural enemies save the Lapis Lazuli Dragons, they normally hide themselves under the sand and spring up upon the slightest vibration to devour any moving prey. The species store nutrients in large spherical sacs growing off their chests that look rather similar to giant grapes, with the females discarding the sacs to lay their fertile eggs in for the babies feed on the nutrients inside until they are too large to be contained and can hunt for themselves. The treasure and bones of their prey ends up being taken by the hive over time.

=== Kin ===
The Kin are an ancient, rare and fabled species of rodent-like flying creatures. They are among the few harmless, gentle creatures in Deltora, thought to only exist in fairy tales to the people of Deltora. They resemble cute, round, bulbous crosses between a pig and a ferret, with pig-like back legs and rodent-like front legs, large leathery wings, velvet-esque fur, expressive faces and pouches like marsupials. Their size ranges from that of a large dog, to almost as large as dragons. They are capable of human speech. Unfortunately, the Kin are very rare in the time of the stories. They once lived on Dread Mountain, where they lived and bred prosperously, but were driven out by the Dread Gnomes who hunted them for sport and enjoyment. Now all that are left of them live at the enchanted Dreaming Spring, where they are gradually dwindling. In the fifth book of the first series, Dread Mountain, Lief, Barda and Jasmine encounter the remaining tribe of Kin at Dreaming Spring and save their only young, an energetic youngster named Prin from a pair of Grey Guards. For reasons of adventure, homesickness and owing a debt to the heroes, three older Kin agree to take them to their former, now Gnome-controlled home of the mountain. When they can go no further and these three Kin leave, the three heroes discover that Prin, desperate to see the Kin's ex-home and disobeying her mother, had followed them. She accompanies them for the rest of the book, helping the three heroes defeat Gellick and eventually allowing the Kin to return to their former home and now live in peace with the Dread Gnomes. They reappear in the third series, where they help Barda, Lief and Jasmine.

=== Polypan ===
Polypans are a race of monkey-like creatures. They are not commonly seen in Deltora, but it is usually said that someone that has a polypan in their service is usually up to no good. Polypans are also notoriously known to be skilled pick-pockets. The only polypan featured in the series is Chett (though there were others featured in the anime). It is said that a Polypan is able to steal the shirt off your back without you noticing.

=== Grippers ===
Grippers are flat, broad leafed plants that grow in Jalis territory. They appear as flat plants with purple flowers, but when touched, reveal a mouth filled with teeth that eats what touches it. When biting its victim, it injects a chemical that prevents blood from clotting, which would cause one to bleed out even if they escape, but it can be treated with Gripper Salve. They can only grow in deep earth.

=== Granous ===
The Granous are evil creatures who appear only in the second and third Deltora Quest series. They resemble bestial humanoids (similar to yeti) with dog-like noses, long, clawed fingers, and whitish blue fur. They inhabit the Os-Mine hills (also the entrance to the land of the Plumes), a series of old, ill-trodden hills to the west of the Forest of Silence. Granous are sadistic creatures who delight in the torture and grief of others. They roam around their territory in tribes of 10 or so individuals and capture whoever they find on their two feet. The Granuous are carnivores and their favorite food are the fingers and toes of their prey, saying that they are the sweetest tasting parts. Once they have secured a victim, they play a game with it called 20 Questions. In this game, a series of 20 riddles is asked to the victim and they have 20 seconds to solve it. If they cannot solve the riddle in time, the leader Granous bites off one of the victim's fingers (or toes). If all fingers are gone, they start on toes. The penalty for cheating is 5 fingers. This method of their game stemmed from how they favor the taste of fingers and toes. The fate of its victims is unknown once the 20 questions are up although it can be presumed that the person would die from being eaten or from blood loss. Granous are cowardly creatures, however, thus with a bit of oppression and intimidation, they can easily be driven off. They seem to be the natural prey of the topaz dragons. According to Doran the Dragonlover, the flesh of Granous makes any traveller foolish enough to eat them violently ill due to parasites and thus they are best left to be eaten by dragons.

=== Fighting Spiders ===
Fighting spiders are a large species of spider (though not nearly as gargantuan as a Sand Beast or Arach, more like the size of a cat or dog) native to the plains of Deltora. They are often used as pets by the people of Deltora. They are normally used in a cockfight-style sport (hence their name). Whenever a spider loses, the loser will have a sheer and raw desire to find its opponent and challenge it to a rematch. The only known fighting spiders featured in the series are Flash and Fury, Glock and Jinks' fighting spiders.

=== The Fear ===
The Fear is an underground aquatic beast which presumably became entrapped within the secret caverns beneath Deltora during the cataclysm of the continents of Pirra and Deltora coming together to form a single land. The creature is a hybrid of several kinds of mollusk, resembling a mix of a gigantic snail crossed with an octopus or squid. It has a mass of hundreds of thread-tipped tentacles ringed around a beaked mouth growing out of the shell. Though the shell of the creature has become stuck with the roof of its cavern and it is now part of the cave, its tentacles allow it to reach any part of its domain without it having to move and since it lives in the caverns deep beneath the earth with very little light, it relies more on touch than sight. Its tentacles are incredibly hard and durable, even when Glock attempted to slice one with his sword, his weapon broke in half. The Fear features as the key monster in the first book of the second series, The Cavern of the Fear. In it, it terrorizes the Pirran faction who live in the ruby caverns, the Plumes. It demands a living sacrifice each year, or it creates great waves which destroy the Plume village. Glock, Barda, Lief and Jasmine are captured by the Plumes to be sacrificed to The Fear, but a deal is struck up that the companions can slay the beast. They eventually manage to do so, at the price of Glock's life and the Plumes give them the mouthpiece of the Pirran Pipe in return. The Plumes originally believed that The Fear was a monster that was bred by the Aurons to terrorize them although later on this was proven to be untrue.

=== Arach ===
Derived from arachnid, the Arach are giant Spider-like creatures who appear in the second book of the Deltora Shadowlands series: Isle of Illusion. Arach live in caves, but can walk on water. They have huge, bloated bodies, and are purplish-black in color with eight blood red eyes. They have 8 spindly legs which bear spikes and are clawed at the end. They are both venomous and have the ability to spin webs. They are highly vicious creatures whose first motive when they spot a living thing is to tear it to shreds and feast upon it. One can guess that they are descended from the beasts of the sea of Deltora's ancient times. In The Isle of Illusion, it is learned that a group of the Pirran faction known as the Aurons has broken off from the others to try to establish a magically simulated recreation of their former homeland of Pirra. The Arach (who apparently hate light) came out of hiding when the water around the Aurons' island began to darken. They are also attracted to the heat of the island. Lief, Barda and Jasmine are forced to contend with several of them before getting into the dome in which the simulated Pirra is located. When they destroy the simulation spell and the light which was held within the dome escapes into the caverns, the Arach attempt to take refuge in the darkened dome. While the three heroes hid, the leader and last of the separated Auron group, in a desperate attempt to preserve the spell which fueled the simulated Pirra, is killed by the creatures. When the spell ends and the light is returned, the Arach flee back into hiding. The Arach are very strong and very fast on land and water.

=== Forbidden Passage Leeches ===
Leeches with wings that live in the Forbidden Passage. The Kerons use them for fish bait. They die if exposed to light. The Kerons did not light the Forbidden Passage because they believed that if they killed all the leeches, their defense against the Aurons would be gone.

=== Capricons ===
Capricons are the Deltora Quest equivalent of Fauns or Satyrs, having the upper body of a human and the lower body of a goat. Only one appears in the first book of the third series: Dragon's Nest. He is known as Rolf and though he is a friend at first whom Lief, Barda and Jasmine rescue from the Granous, in the end it turns out he was a servant of the Shadow Lord and the guardian of the Sister of the East. The Capricons supposedly once lived in a beautiful, rose-pink city named Capra in the far northeast of Deltora. Apparently, however, they were greedy and selfish creatures deep down and their city was destroyed by the ruby dragons due to them stealing their eggs to make dragon eggshell lanterns. Humans then came and built the city of Broome on the ruins of the place and most Capricons nowadays live outside the city in the forests, where every evening, they come out to the edge of the city to take the plates of food left for them by Broome's populace. The Capricons rely on this entirely, as they do not have any real survival skills, but maintain a prideful hatred and resentment towards humans as a whole, despite the aid and food people give them. While most Capricons live near Broome, a few exist who are wandering rogues, like Rolf.

=== Orchard Keepers ===
The Orchard Keeper is a large species of bird of prey that dwells around the Forest of Silence (though they make no appearance and have no mention until the third series). They catch their prey in an interesting way: they find and keep orchards of Sleeper Trees, the delicious fruit of which causes paralysis. Using the bones of victims, it makes paths to their orchard which lure victims to it, which in turn eat the fruit and become immobilized. The Orchard Keeper then comes and devours the prey. Despite these undeniably evil habits, killing an Orchard Keeper is said to be bad luck. In the first book of the third series, Dragon's Nest, Lief, Barda and Jasmine nearly fall victim to an Orchard Keeper and its hunting method.

=== Blood Lilies and Fleshbanes ===
Blood lilies are a plant that grows on Blood Lily Island, hence the name, while Fleshbanes are carnivorous insects that live among the lilies and resemble their petals. The creatures live in a symbiotic relationship. The lilies excrete a pollen which numbs anyone walking through them, leaving the person unable to feel when the fleshbanes begin eating them. After the fleshbanes finish, any scraps are left to nourish the lilies and let them keep growing. Lief, Barda and Jasmine nearly fall prey to them in Isle of the Dead, but are saved when Kree notices what is happening from above. It is later revealed that the fleshbanes ate the diamond dragon during her enchanted sleep, while she slept on the island, but were unable to eat the egg she had laid, thus her baby survived. Lief theorizes that it is possible that when she went to sleep during the time of Doran, the lilies only grew in a ring around the island to keep out intruders, but during the centuries with no dragons to graze on them, they spread over the island.

=== Kobb ===
A giant golden-brown amphibious fish monster with a mane of seaweed-like hair and a long, blue tongue that can be used to drag prey down to it. It hunts on the west coast of Deltora like the Glus, another quite mysterious sea monster. It leaves a clear slime in its path that, over time, has thickly coated the Isle of Dead. Its home was in the cave on the Isle of Dead where until recently the Sister of the West had taken up residence. The song of the Sister held it back until it was destroyed letting the Kobb return home. In the Tenna Birdsong Tale "The Land of Dragons", it lists the Kobb as one of the sea monsters that invaded the land. It is featured on the cover of the Isle of the Dead.

=== Dragons ===
The dragons of Deltora are considered to be the land's most magnificent, mysterious and powerful of all its creatures and are the only creatures that the Shadow Lord himself fears for they are the strongest and most resilient against his magic. There were seven different dragon tribes, each one drawing power from and associated with the seven different gems of Deltora. (diamond, emerald, lapis lazuli, topaz, opal, ruby, amethyst). Dragons were colored according to which territory they were born in i.e. dragons born in the ruby territory were ruby red. The dragons believed that if one should reveal one's true name, those who knew that individual's name had great power over them and so the dragons rarely revealed their names and only did so to those they truly trusted. Long ago the dragons of Deltora were quite numerous, until the Shadow Lord sent his monstrous birds, the Ak-Baba, to hunt down the dragons until one of each tribe remained. This was when "Doran the Dragonlover", or "Dragonfriend" to the dragons, came to each of the remaining dragons, having them swear an oath. This oath entitled that each dragon would go into a deep hibernation until the current king, wearing the Belt of Deltora, would come to them and awaken them. Once awakened, they must also never to use the other dragons' hibernation to their advantage to invade their lands. In present day, Lief went to each of the dragons' lands and awakened them one by one and calling upon them for assistance in destroying the Four Sisters, for dragon fire seemed to be the most efficient weapon against the Shadow Lord's magic. They were called upon by Lief to destroy the Grey Tide and Lief inadvertently revealed all of the names of the dragons to one another and so they all had equal power over one another. It is rumored that a dragon can lay eggs without a mate, if the need arises. Secrets of Deltora revealed the individual dragons' genders.

==== Fidelis ====
Dragon of the topaz, gold as the stone of his territory, Fidelis is the first dragon the companions encounter and awaken. Originally found during the search for the Pirran Pipe, Fidelis was awakened when Lief came into his territory wearing the true Belt of Deltora. He saved Lief and his companions from Granous and then spoke to Lief. He sensed one of the sisters in his domain and meant to destroy it. But Lief informed him that the sister he was sensing, was the sister of the east located in the ruby dragon's domain. Fidelis refused to accompany Lief to Dragon's Nest to destroy the Sister of the East, because Doran (Dragonfriend) had bound him to the promise of never entering another dragon's territory while they slept. He was found later that Lief was wrong because the fourth sister (the sister of the south), was located in the gold dragon domain. Lief later re-encountered Fidelis in Del, where he flew over the city, trying to get to the Sister of the South to destroy it. He was wounded by the citizens of Del, but still helped Lief destroy the Sister. He later carried Barda, Lief and Jasmine on his back to the ruins of Hira to stop the Grey Tide and fought alongside the dragon of the opal. Lief, who when touching Doran the Dragonlover's soul stone had acquired a list of names, realized what they were. He called them, revealing the topaz dragon to be Fidelis. The name itself means "faith". Fidelis' lair is located in the Os-Mine Hills, a feared part of the Deltora countryside.

==== Joyeu ====
The dragon of the ruby and the second to be awakened, Joyeu was for a time impersonated by the evil capricorn Rolf. The true Joyeu later revealed herself when Rolf attacked Lief and his group in Dragon's Nest. After destroying Rolf, Joyeu teamed up with Lief to destroy the Sister of the East. Later, she carried Lief and his friends on her back to the northwestern edge of herterritory. Joyeu next appeared when Lief called her name to do battle with the seven Ak-Baba. Joyeu's lair is located somewhere in the vicinity of Dragon's Nest. The name is taken from the French word 'Joyeux' which means joy in English.

==== Fortuna ====
Fortuna is the dragon of the lapis lazuli and the third to be awoken. She is disliked by Honora (the emerald dragon). Fortuna is mentioned only a few times in the books but is quite a friendly (albeit mischievous) dragon. Fortuna seems to be the smallest of the dragons (besides the baby diamond dragon), but her high speed more than makes up for its smaller size. Fortuna flew into Honora's territory and was chased away. Her natural prey seems to be large insects and the sand beasts of the Shifting Sands. Her lair is located in a cavern which is hidden by a waterfall, called The Funnel. Her name comes from fortune which is what the lapis lazuli is the symbol for.

==== Honora ====
Dragon of the emerald and fourth to be awakened, Honora has great dislike for the lapis lazuli dragon, whom she considers sly for trusting in luck rather than in honor. When she wakes up, she senses Fortuna in her territory and attacks her in rage. She later returns to help Lief destroy the Sister of the North. Honora comes to the company again, demanding the emerald not be taken away from her territory. She does not seem to care that she is breaking her vow by entering the amethyst's territory, in spite of her commitment to the ideal of honor. Honora consequently has a heated argument with Jasmine, who accuses her of being hypocritical. Honora is a bit haughty and stingy. Honora returns once more when Lief summons the seven dragons and is angry at Lief for revealing her name. However, she is powerless to stop the other dragons from learning her name, let alone herself from doing the same. Honora's lair is located somewhere in the mountains that line the Deltora/Shadowlands border. Her name seems to come from the word honor, which emerald dragons are known for.

==== Veritas ====
Dragon of the amethyst, Veritas is the fifth dragon to be awoken. However, as he was digging out of his hiding place (his hiding place was in some sand banks), the amethyst in the Belt of Deltora, meant to give the dragon his strength, was removed from his territory. Veritas was still able to breathe but was trapped under the sand which had grown larger while he had been sleeping. He was still alive but terribly weak and believed that he would die. He is found by Lief and Barda and then fully unearthed by the Torans. Veritas tells Lief his name as a precaution and comes forward when the elder diamond dragon was found to be dead. Veritas fights the monster Kobb and then with Lief finds the Sister of the West hidden in the ancient body of Doran the Dragonlover, still alive after centuries because of a curse put on him. Veritas takes away Doran's breath at his wish and then destroys the Sister of the West. Veritas also inscribes Doran's tombstone and stays in the diamond territory to tutor the infant diamond dragon. He reappears when Lief calls the names of the seven dragons to battle the Ak-Baba. It is Veritas who names the young diamond dragon Forta, after her mother. Jis name comes from the Latin word veritas which means truth in English.

==== Forta ====
Forta is a name given to two dragons of the diamond. The first one was the dragon that Doran convinced to hide herself and the second was her daughter. The original was found dead on Blood Lily Island, where she had fallen asleep and then been devoured by the Flesh Banes of that island. However, the younger Forta was found by Lief and his friends, inside her egg amid the bones of her mother. She hatched from her egg at the coming of the Belt of Deltora, too small to destroy the Sister of the West. She was the sixth dragon to be found. Lief later pulled her from a pocket in his cloak and showed her to Doran, who thought that her tribe was lost forever. Forta was then tutored by Veritas of the amethyst, who named her after her mother when Lief called their names. Her name derives from the Latin word 'fortis' meaning 'strong' because the diamond is the symbol for strength. She also resembles the Jalis Tribe.

==== Hopian ====
Hopian is the dragon of the opal and the last, the seventh, to be awakened. He is also the largest and fiercest of the Deltoran dragons. Later, when Lief and company rode Fidelis to the ruins of Hira, Hopian arose in rage. However, he was diverted by the arrival of the seven Ak-Baba. Fidelis joined forces with him, but the two were still outmatched. Lief then called the names of the seven dragons and they banded together to destroy the Shadow Lord's last plan. Hopian's lair is located somewhere near the City of the Rats. Hopian has never spoken aloud in any of the book series, so his temper or attitude cannot be interpreted, aside from disliking other dragons entering his territory. His name comes from hope, which the opal is the symbol of. In Secrets of Deltora, hundreds of years before the events of the series, Hopian was revealed to have sensed the growing evil in the Opal Territory's city of Hira (later the City of the Rats) and planned to tear the city down to destroy it. It is implied that he sensed either Reeah, the snake created by the Shadow Lord, or the Grey Tide. However, to protect him, Doran convinced Hopian to sleep until the king wearing the Belt of Deltora awakened him, putting this plan on hold.

== Villains ==
=== The Shadow Lord ===
The Shadow Lord is the main antagonist throughout the series, the Dark Lord of the northern region once called Pirra made into a wasteland known as the Shadowlands, similar to Sauron in Mordor, in Tolkien's Legendarium. Once a human sorcerer from Dorne named Malverlain had a deep hatred for all things good with a belief that in life, the Shadow Lord encountered the four sisters whose song had a negative effect on him. The Shadow Lord attempted to silence the four sisters by spreading them out over the island that they lived on, but the sisters continued to sing to each other as he decides to murder them. However, realizing their song was meant to keep the Great Beast at bay, the Shadow Lord conjured a raft to flee the sinking island.

Sometime later, the Shadow Lord came upon the Land of Dragons, "Deltora" as it is later called, and made attempts to conquer it. But was repelled by a spell cast by the Torans and unable to bribe an emerald dragon to serve him, the Shadow Lord came to Pirra where he recruited the residential thieves and monstrous beasts of the mountainside into his services. The Shadow Lord even bred the Ak-Babas to have a power equal to the dragons of Deltora. It was only once he tricked the Piran people to separate the Pirran Pipe, a flute that weakened him, the Shadow Lord conquered Pirra without trouble. By that time, the Shadow Lord's mortality runs its course and he died. However, due to his strong attachment, the Shadow Lord's spirit became an entity of pure darkness, shrouded in grey and red clouds (in the anime, the Shadow Lord takes on the form of a colossal black devil/demon made of shadows and black smoke with flaming red eyes). In his new form, the Shadow Lord's voice has the power to create or move objects.

The Shadow Lord proceeded to conquer the Land of Dragons but was foiled by Adin the blacksmith, who united all the seven tribes of the land into the nation of Deltora and created the only existing item that repelled the Shadow Lord - the Belt of Deltora. Furious, the Shadow Lord withdrew and began concocting a series of plans by using Ols to infiltrate Del and manipulate the royal family for generations, sending his Ak-Babas and implanting his version of the four sisters and the Grey Tide in Deltora. How he got the Ols to cross the border in the first place and how the first Ol gained the monarchy's loyalty may be a plot hole, but it is possible that the first ones he sent were humans, and after they arranged for the monarchs to wear the Belt only on special occasions and had the royal family move into the palace to isolate them, the trust of the people in their king was weakened enough that he was able to send Ols into Deltora to advise the monarchy from then on. Learning that Doran knew of his plans, the Shadow Lord forced him into becoming an immortal vessel of the Sister of the West. Once the preparations were completed, the Shadow Lord resumes his invasion while having the Ak-Baba take each of the belt's dislodged gems to a perilous and terrifying place that is home to a monstrous creature to serve as an obstacle to any who try to find them.

The Shadow Lord reigned in Deltora for years until the gems were recovered by Lief, a descendant of Adin, as well as Barda, and Jasmine of Del. Though driven off once the Belt is restored, the Shadow Lord continued to torment Lief by speaking in his mind using the viewing crystal, formerly used by Prandine to communicate with the Shadow Lord, that remained inside the palace in Del. Using the same crystal, the Shadow Lord also lured Jasmine into the Shadowlands, knowing that Lief (and the Belt of Deltora) would follow since he was aware of Lief's love for Jasmine (even though Lief himself was not aware of it until much later). He didn't count on Lief and his companions also bringing with them the reassembled Pirran Pipe that they used to free those enslaved and take them to Deltora. Soon after, Lief destroyed the crystal to end the Shadow Lord's link to him. As planned, this set Lief on a quest to destroy the Four Sisters, which the Shadow Lord hoped would lead to his death or unleash the Grey Tide, likely to make Deltora a part of the Shadowlands. However, he was disappointed thanks to Doran's efforts in saving the last dragons.

Despite these setbacks, the Shadow Lord is still plotting against the present and future heirs of the kingdom of Deltora, as well as his homeland of Dorne from which he was exiled.

=== Ak-Baba ===
Ak-Baba are giant reptilian vulture-like birds that live for a thousand years. The Shadow Lord discovered the Ak-Baba when he ordered his followers to find dragon eggs in order to raise his own army of dragons against those of Deltora. He personally found an egg in Deltora's North Mountains, thinking it was a dragon egg. However, the egg was actually that of an Ak-Baba, a species of giant bird from a foreign land. In his frustration, the Shadow Lord almost slew the hatchling, but then saw potential in the beast and decided to use it anyway. He then further bred the beasts to be more wicked and monstrous to carry out his dark bidding. It was the Ak-Baba who hunted the dragons of Deltora near extinction until Doran the Dragonlover (known as Dragonfriend to the dragons) persuaded them to sleep until a king of Deltora wearing the Belt of Deltora came to rouse them. The Shadow Lord is in control of at least seven Ak-Baba which took the seven gems to the seven areas of Deltora. In The Sister of the South, the dragons face off against the Ak-Baba. In the resulting battle, the dragons finally working together as a team overwhelms the Ak-Baba, with four of the foul birds being killed and the rest fleeing to the Shadowlands. In the anime the Ak-Baba are far more reptilian in appearance, lack feathers completely, have dragon-like wings and a long tail. Seven Ak-Baba are shown on the cover of Return to Del.

=== Greers ===
Greers were the original soldiers created by the Shadow Lord. They are mention in Secrets of Deltora and appear fully in Tales of Deltora. Unlike their successors, the Grey Guards, the Greers are largely unintelligent, ugly, and hideous. They are weak in sunlight, and were placed under the command of Wrass and Sheela, two humans who served as the Shadow Lord's Generals. Though they were competent fighters, they were imperfect, and easily tricked due to their lack of intelligence. During the first war for control of Deltora, Adin and his armies faced the Greers at Hira, where they were defeated when both their commanders were slain and the Belt of Deltora was completed.

=== Grey Guards ===
Grey Guards are part of the Shadow Lord's attacking force. They serve as the Shadow Army's foot soldiers. Their main and most fatal weapon are 'blisters', which are filled with Gellick's poison, explode on impact and cause a quick but torturous death. Grey Guards possess an incredible amount of durability, speed and accuracy. They can stay up nearly all night and not get tired, they have exceptional smell and can sniff nearly anything out no matter how far away it is. The various pods have names, such as "Carn pod", and an identical pod is grown in time to replace the ageing pod, so that to the populace it seems that Carn pod goes to the Shadowlands and then Carn pod returns invigorated, good for another seven years. Somehow Jasmine knows about the general idea of pods (that they don't know mothers or fathers because they "are raised in groups of ten") when Lief and Barda first meet her, it is questionable how she knows, given that the general populace does not seem to know. Her father did go to the Shadowlands and may have learned this information, but never returned to her to share it. The Grey Guards do not actually know that they are grown in factories and replaced regularly, so they could not have talked about it while Jasmine listened in. It is possible, if not likely, that Kree heard this from other birds: aside from that, there is no ready explanation.

=== Vraal ===
Vraal are ferocious green-skinned lizard-like man sized beasts with hoofed feet, specifically bred to relentlessly attack anything they see as an enemy until it is completely destroyed. In the anime, the Vraal are presented to have single eye in the middle of its mouth. The Vraal cannot feel pain or pity, only a savage thirst for blood and meat and the thrill of battle. Only the Shadow Lord can make them do his bidding by controlling their minds. Most Vraals are found in the Shadowlands and are used in the Shadow Arenas to fight the prisoners and slaves the Grey Guards and other villainous creatures under the command of the Shadow Lord pit them against. The only one to survive going against a Vraal was Jarred, who fled out of the arena with the monster in pursuit. Losing its prey on Dread Mountain, that Vraal later confronted Lief and his friends and nearly killed them were it not for Prin managed to splatter purple moss over its face, blinding the Vraal as it tumbled into a stream and was carried away.

=== Ols ===
Ols are the Shadow Lord's shapeshifters (doppelgangers in their own right). They are inherently self-centered, seeking only their own promotion, achieved by pleasing the Shadow Lord. At the core of every Ol is the Shadow Lord's mark and in whatever shape the Ol takes, that mark is always somewhere on the body. Most Ols attempt to cover the mark with clothing or camouflage it with tattoos. Grade 1 Ols and Grade 2 Ols can be killed by stabbing them through the heart, which is located on the right-hand side: given the evidence so far, Grade 3 Ols might not be able to be killed in this manner. Josef wrote in The Deltora Book of Monsters that he was almost assassinated by two Ols. One day when he was hiding in the streets of Del, he met a Dread Gnome that tried to warn Del's people of Gellick and Ols and other evil creatures. Josef paid little heed until the next morning when he found the gnome dead. The murderers were a pair of Ols that hung out near the inn where Josef was staying and they would have assassinated him as well if Steven had not been in the area and allowed Nevets to kill them. Ols come in three types:

- Grade 1 Ols:
  - Can mimic any living creature – from the description, size does not matter, but all the Ols shown have been humanoid, or animals at least as large as a woodmouse.
  - When they mimic, they leave a brand exposed on their body.
  - Are very cold to the touch and can cause freeze burns during attacks.
  - Can not hold their shape for very long.
  - Cannot eat or drink.
  - Must travel in pairs, although the pairs do not need to look alike and may even be different species.
- Grade 2 Ols:
  - Can hold their shape for 3 days, after this there is a break in concentration, a spasm known as "The Tremor", which is an unmistakable sign of an Ol.
  - When they mimic, their brand is hidden.
  - capable of mimicking the acts of eating and drinking.
  - able to produce body heat.
  - They are also able to travel alone.
- Grade 3 Ols:
  - Can shapeshift into even non-living things.
  - Their brand cannot be seen.
  - Can hold their shape indefinitely.
  - Are indistinguishable from the real person, except by personality (for a convincing performance, the Ol would have to have time to study the one being mimicked).
  - Can travel alone.
  - Can die like the beings they imitate, for example when Prandine was killed by being pushed out a window by Sharn.

In other words, Ols are evil Shadow Creatures from the Shadowlands and they were concocted by the Shadow Lord himself, deep in the Shadow Factory. They are evil shape-shifting Shadow Creatures that are evil, white apparitions in their natural forms, but then they can transform into any shape or form they want. There are three evil Shadow Grades: Grade 1 Ols are evil and crude, Grade 2 Ols are evil and shrewd, Grade 3 Ols are evil and the perfect plan of the Shadow Lord's evil Shadow Sorcery.

==== Dain ====
Dain was originally a nervous servant to Doom and a member of the Resistance. He was cultured, polite, respectful, often afraid, yet noble in battle and showing evidence of a great spirit. He saved Barda, Lief and Jasmine from the Ols before they knew what an Ol was and helped them escape from Doom when Doom held them prisoner for his own reasons. However, Dain was kidnapped by pirates. When the trio later encountered the same pirates, Dain had just freed himself with the help of a polypan and he came with them to Tora, the magical city. Dain had hoped to meet his parents in Tora, but the city was deserted. He seemed to be all but destroyed by the news, but once they left the city he seemed to feel more hopeful. In the final book, Lief assembles representatives of all seven tribes to pledge loyalty to the Heir and thus hope that the Belt will lead them to the Heir. It seems clear that Dain is the heir (his name is even made of the same letters as the first King, Adin), but just then he gets kidnapped. Lief picks up his fallen dagger and carries it with him. Knowing that they must get the Belt to the true Heir, the team makes plans to get into the city. However, their plans are all anticipated and most of the group is captured. It turns out Dain is not the Heir, but a Grade 3 Ol, capable of assuming even inanimate shapes, and sent to spy on the Resistance and eventually on the trio. The fact that he had killed other Ols is not surprising: they were less talented varieties and the Shadow Lord's creations don't have anything resembling a conscience. Ols think only of furthering their own usefulness to the Shadow Lord. The fact that he was an Ol was the reason he was weakened when he entered the magical city of Tora, as its magic weakens evil. In the end, it is the Belt of Deltora itself that destroys Dain. Dain's betrayal is one of the larger shocks in the tale, despite the previous depiction of Grade 3 Ols. It is known that Dain had some admiration towards Jasmine, but reveal that he played her and the companions, only to dragging them into his plans of claiming the Belt of Deltora. Dain is later killed by Lief when he puts the Belt of Deltora around the Ol's waist during the battle to liberate Deltora from the Shadow Lord, dissolving him into a puddle of ooze.

==== Prandine ====
Endon's chief advisor, who turns out to be a servant of the Shadow Lord. Like those before him, Prandine was given the task to deceive the royal family of Deltora into a state of helplessness while ensuring they would have no support from the people by the time the Shadow Lord made his move. In the process, Prandine murdered King Alton (Endon's father) and his wife with a poisoned knife and covered it up by claiming them to have died of an illness. He then drove Jarred off soon after and then silenced Min years later when the plan's final steps commence. After the jewels were scattered and the Belt shattered, Prandine confronts Jarred, Endon and Sharn in the highest tower, ready to murder them with his poisoned knife as he held Sharn at blade's point. However, he underestimates the resourcefulness of the "painted doll" Sharn, who tricks him into looking out from the window under the assumption that help arrived and shoved him to his death. Prandine is thought by Lief to be a Grade 3 Ol, due to a speech made by Fallow in the fifth book of the first series (Dread Mountain). However, he is the one who puts the Belt of Deltora on King Endon's waist when he becomes king. This is because, due to the centuries of neglect Deltora suffered under the monarchs before Endon, the people's trust in their king was so weak that the Belt was not able to kill him.

==== Fallow ====
A Grade 3 Ol who appears to act as a personal advisor to the Shadow Lord, Fallow assumed the form of Prandine due to the Shadow Lord apparently favoring that particular form. He interrogates Lief's father, asking about the boy (Lief), the man (Barda) and the wild girl with a black bird (Jasmine and Kree) and questioning if the boy in the group is his son who is undoing the Shadow Lord's grip on the land of Deltora. He also mistakenly thought that the man that was traveling with him (Barda) is none other than King Endon himself. Fallow also seems to have an addiction to Lumin, a reward the Shadow Lord granted him, however the Shadow Lord threatens to take it away if Fallow does not buckle down in finding the heir of Deltora as well as the traitors. Fallow was the one who posted the punishment for Lief's allies (although it is normally a Grey Guard who does this but since it was a special situation, Fallow was granted the honor) but was driven back by Lief using the Belt of Deltora. He was killed by having a cone of white, flaming liquid fall on him, dousing him in the burning substance, but not before murdering King Endon.

==== Marie and Ida ====
Marie and Ida are the first Ols that Lief, Barda and Jasmine encounter. They masquerade as two small girls drowning in a river, and Lief saves Ida, while Barda goes deeper to save Marie. However, after Ida is taken to warm up by Jasmine, she is shot in the back with an arrow by Dain, causing Marie to reveal her true form and try to strangle Barda. After she is killed, Dain explains to the companions what Ols are. He reveals Marie and Ida were Grade 1 Ols, which was why the Shadow Lord's mark was on their left cheeks, and that they pretended to be drowning to explain why their skin was cold. They are also shown, when dying, to have followed the companions for days as mice.

==== 3-19 ====
3-19 is a Grade 3 Ol in the shape of Fallow who appears in the Shadowlands. He is assumed to be the 19th Grade 3 Ol created, due to his name. He oversees the Conversion Project, along with Tira, and is often belittled by her, as she points out the failure of his kind compared to the slugs. During the unveiling of the project, he is told to release the worms to allow them to possess the prisoners, but Lief points out to him that if he does, the Shadow Lord will not need him anymore, causing him to hesitate. The Shadow Lord then strikes him down, presumably killing him, and has the worms released anyway.

=== Faith ===
Faith is an apparition that Jasmine sees in the crystal that the Chief Advisors used to speak to the Shadow Lord while deceiving the kings and queens of Deltora. She is supposedly Jasmine's sister, who her mother was pregnant with at the time her parents were taken. However, she is simply used to lure Jasmine to the Shadowlands in the hope Lief will follow. When the companions finally reach the arena, Jasmine tries to get her to help them so they can all escape, but she then reveals it was all a lie, and disappears.

=== Conversion Project Slugs ===
Pink worm-analogues, the result of the Shadow Lord's biological research, that dig into the brain and allow the Shadow Lord to gain control. Their method of controlling their hosts is very similar to the Yeerks from Animorphs. They are the latest and so far most perfect of his creations. The Shadow Lord planned to implant these worms in the brains of his slaves and then return them to Deltora to act as spies to fool their family and friends. The Shadow Lord's plan worked for a while until Lief, Barda and Jasmine stopped him. They found more of the worms when they visited the Shadowlands. Before they were perfected they would damage their host, for example: deafness, blindness, headaches, and babbling.

=== Sorceress Thaegan ===
Thaegan is one of the major villains in the series, similar to the traditional interpretation of an evil fairy tale witch. Her mother was a free-spirited sorceress named Tamm who used her magic for benevolent reasons such as healing. But Thaegan was much different as she was spiteful to other living beings, with an interest in the dark arts. As a result, Theagan ran away from home after sheer disgust towards her mother, whom she murdered after mastering the dark arts. Her favorite food is a live raven, ironically assuming a similar form: thus she apparently ate Kree's parents and causing him to flee to the Forests of Silence. Though the only way she could die is if a single drop of her tainted blood hits the ground, Thaegan can use her magic to create a barrier around herself while not needing to cast a spell. Over time her power grew and out of hatred for vitality of the life and beauty, turned the city of D'Or into the site of the Lake of Tears with in occupants turned into various creatures. When the Ralads had known of her treachery, they spoke out against her, so she used her magic to render them mute. By the time the Shadow Lord took over Deltora, Thaegan became one of his most powerful allies and her power grew with his dominance. After hearing of the death of her children Jin and Jod, Theagan tracks Lief, Jasmine and Barda to the Lake of Tears as they nearly obtained the ruby. In fight that followed, Thaegan almost destroyed them were it not for Kree pecking her finger just as she lowered her barrier to blast the heroes, undoing her enchantments with her death.

In the anime, the Shadow Lord revives Thaegan through her ring after a rat brought the item to him. Fully restored after the events at the Shifting Sands, Theagan finds her remaining children so they get revenge, recruiting Hot, Tot, Fie, and Fly to bring Lief's group to her. However, after being aged by the lapis lazuli and accidentally killing her four children, Thaegan is killed off by Lief cutting her ring finger off with her ring taken by the group to ensure she is not revived again. However, Theagan is revived again by the Shadow Lord, who motivates the sorceress with fear of her beauty being ravaged if she fails him again. Using the Mirror of Fear she received, capturing them after their hardship in the Maze of the Beast, Theagan attempts to torture Lief's group before murdering them once and for all. However, the plan failed as Shadow Lord's curse takes effect with Thaegan losing her magic while the spell that kept her youthful is broken as she reduced to an old corpse hag. She refused to live on in this state and decided to kill herself with what little magic she had remaining, unexpectedly taking most of her remaining offspring with her as she spent her final moments expressing motherly love to them and the spirits of her deceased children.

==== Thaegan's 13 Children ====
Thaegan has 13 demonic children who are named in an uncanny rhyme in the giant's riddle: "Hot, Tot, Jin, Jod, Fie, Fly, Zan, Zod, Pik, Snik, Lun, Lod and the dreaded Ichabod". Her children are monstrous in appearance, gluttonous and greedy in nature to the point of fighting each other when they get into arguments. They all also possess extraordinary shapeshifting skills on par with the Ols, usually assuming the forms of wolves. While Thaegan is similar to a fairy tale witch, her children are like other monsters from folklore such as trolls, ogres and goblins of other fairy tales (and the fact that her children can shapeshift into wolves makes them similar to stories about werewolves). Most of her children are divided into sets of twins having similar-sounding names, most of them being identical twins. After the deaths of Jin and Jod and their mother, the remaining siblings pursue Lief's group and attempt to take revenge for their kin. But the attempt ends with them turning on each other for who gets to eat their captives after being tricked by Lief. In the book series the remaining thirteen kill each other over who gets to eat Lief, Barda and Jasmine with only Ichabod remaining.

In the anime, however, the surviving children do not kill each other over whoever eats Lief, Barda and Jasmine, only throttling each other to the point of unconsciousness and return afterwards to cause trouble throughout the rest of the series. Despite them and their mother being evil, Thaegan dearly loves her children and her children are loving and loyal in return to the point of dying with her. In both stories, Ichabod survived his family and worked for the Shadow Lord before his own demise.

- Jin and Jod: A pair of green troll-like monsters, Jin is a grotesquely fat being with a pair of yellow tusks and three small horns on the back of her head while Jod is a toadish creature with dagger-like teeth and flaring nostrils. The two mask their true evil selves as a kindly elderly couple named Nij and Doj in a cottage surrounded by quicksand, speaking their sentences backwards to fool their victims into thinking they are simply speaking an incomprehensible language. Jin and Jod proceed to trap the anyone in their cottage, drugging them before making them into a meal. One such victim, Manus, was spared as he was too small to eat and tortured by them before escaping them though a hidden bridge. Though recaptured by the Grey Guards to be escorted back to Jin and Jod, Manus is saved by Lief's group as they nearly fell into the fiends' trap. In the battle that ensued, Jin and Jod become victims of their own quicksand, drowning as a result. Their spirits endured and stayed by their mother's side to the very end.
- Fie and Fly: A pair of large green ogre-like monsters with tattoo-like markings on their bodies. Though the two are killed off by Ichabod in the book series, the two survived and assumed the guise of a girl named Francois to help their mother Thaegan in her revenge scheme on Lief's group. But the attempt ends with them being accidentally vaporized by their mother. Their spirits endured and stayed by their mother's side to the very end.
- Hot and Tot: Two impish, yellow-skinned creatures who are the most immature. Though killed off in the book series, the two survived in the anime to help Theagan in her revenge by posing as Francois' hat and bag, though the imps get into arguments with Fie and Fly over eating Lief's group before getting them to Theagan. But the revenge plot ends with them being accidentally vaporized by their mother. Their spirits endured and stayed by their mother's side to the very end.
- Ichabod: A massive beast with thick arms and legs and slimy red-pink skin that resembles (or might possibly even be) muscle tissue. Being the oldest, Ichabod is the strongest and most intelligent of his siblings, as well as the most loyal to Theagan. Managing to be the sole winner of fight over who got to eat Lief's group, Ichabod loses them when they escape. The last of Theagan's brood in both storylines, Ichabod later resurfaces in the events of Return to Del, breaking into Withick Mire during the rebels' meeting and supposedly kidnapping Dain, who actually assumed the form a dagger Lief carried. When the Belt is restored and worn by Lief, it is revealed that Steven confronted Ichabod in the kitchens while he was feasting and killed him.
- The other children are composed of Pik and Snik (two humanoids covered in long brown hair that obscures most of their features), Lan and Lod (pale monsters with bald skin and bulbous noses), Zan (a humanoid upper torso with beige skin but has six stumpy legs and had two horns and a large shark-like mouth), and Zod (an ogre-like monster covered in lumps with a huge mouth). They helped in Thaegan's final attempt to do away with Lief's group by entering the Mirror of Fear to torture the group by assuming the forms of what they most feared. However, when their mother destroys herself, they joined in her death out of sheer love for her.

=== Ra-Kacharz ===
Are the ruling class in Noradz. They are dressed from head-to-toe in red and carry whips. Their name is a derivative of "rat catchers" and work for the Shadow Lord. It was they who caused the "rat plague" that drove humanity from the city of Hira, under which was buried a chemical that would pollute the whole of Deltora if released by the burning of the Four Sisters. The Ra-Kacharz are similar to priests, in that they "serve sacred laws", (cleanliness, watchfulness, and duty: three things required for reaction to rat overpopulation) but in other ways are more like oppressors. They keep the people afraid, though of what the citizens do not know. They also provided luxuries for the noble families in Del, blinding them to the poverty on the castle doorsteps. The word "Noradz" is derived from "no rats"; whereas the "blessing" uttered by the Ra-Kacharz, "Noradzeer", means "no rats here". Ra-Kacharz sounds like "rat catchers" since they do not like rats, it is appropriate.

==== Reece ====
The first of the nine Ra-Kacharz, who is heavily against Lief, Barda and Jasmine. He tries to punish them for spilling food, but is outvoted by the others due to them not knowing the customs. Later, when they are found to have brought Filli in, they are put on trial, and he tries to rig the trial so they will be sentenced to death, but Lief outsmarts him. He then doesn't feed them during their imprisonment, intending them to starve, but they are released by Tira, who leads them to a garbage chute out of Noradz. He tries to stop them, but is knocked out by Tira and taken through the chute by the companions, who have taken the uniforms of other Ra-Kacharz to disguise themselves. Exposed on the arms and face due to Jasmine taking his gloves and face covering to make the Ra-Kacharz boots fit her, he dies from poison on the walls in the chute.

=== Mother Brightly ===
Mother Brightly is the owner of Champions Inn in Rithmere. In secret, she is a servant of the Shadow Lord. She hosts the competitors of the annual Games and pretends to be a kindly, helpful, old lady. She only takes what her customers can afford and provides beds and food until the end of the Games. However, when the winner of the Games is about to leave her Inn, she will tell them of a mysterious horror that befalls all the champions as soon as they leave Rithmere. She advises them to leave for a secret passage that is normally used to transport Queen Bee Cider. When the champion emerges from the passage, he or she is then drugged and kidnapped by Grey Guards who then take them to the Shadowlands where they will duel in the Shadow Arena to provide entertainment. Also, any of the champion's gold or valuables are taken to be re-used in the games the following year as prizes. Mother Brightly also seems to be required to send reports to the Shadow Lord on the conditions and well-being of the fighters she sends there. She does this and tricks Lief and his friends, but with the help of Doom, they manage to escape.

=== Ri-Nan ===
Ri-Nan is a red-bearded, scheming Dread Gnome who is loyal to Gellick. He seemingly agrees with the group's plan to kill him while he sleeps, but when Lief tries, he wakes him up and exposes Gla-Thon and Fa-Glin as helping the companions, and demands that he be made leader in Fa-Glin's place. However, Gellick is disgusted that Ri-Nan is attempting to command him, and simply kills the traitor. In the anime, however, he is saved by the companions, realizes how foolish he had been, and reforms, even helping them in the final battle.

=== Rats ===
Deltora's rat population also seemed to be a problem for Lief and his companions. In the past the Shadow Lord's minions, the Ra-Kacharz, bred these creatures in Hira in order to cause Hira's people to evacuate the city and to feed the snake monster Reeah, the guardian of the opal. When they tried to reach the City of Rats at night, a huge swarm of rats appeared from the city and devoured their supplies and tried to devour them as well. The rats seemed to have an aversion of fire and light and Lief and his companions used fire to ward off the rats. When they reached the city the light from the torches kept the rats at bay as well. Ironically, after Lief and his companions killed Reeah in the book series, the rats that were used to sustain it began devouring its corpse. In the anime, the Shadow Lord demonstrated some command over the rats as one was used to retrieve Thaegan's ring.

=== Nak, Finne, and Milne ===
Three leading pirates who raided the riverside town of Where Waters Meet. In The Maze of the Beast, while the three raid a ferry boat Lief and company rode on in disguise, Milne recognizes Dain and captures him to get the bounty on his head. However, when he later acted out of arrogance that he deserves the bounty, Nak and Finne have Milne tossed with Lief, Jasmine and Barda into the Maze of the Beast. Though he stayed with them at first, Milne ran off out of hysteria before being eventually killed and eaten by Glus. Nak and Finne discovered that Lief and his friends managed to escape the Maze of the Beast and attempted to attack them but fell into the geyser. In the anime, the two survived though were last seen tied up after losing to Lief and company in the ensuing fight.

=== Gren and Rabin ===
Other pirates in the same crew containing Finne, Nak and Milne. They are among the group that tries to sell Dain to the Shadow Lord, and Gren questions whether Nak and Finne, who were left behind to guard their cave, will betray them, but Rabin doesn't think they will, as they will want their share of the gold they get for Dain.

=== Sorcerer Oacus ===
This character is only in the anime version. Oacus is a sadistic emotionless sorcerer with power over fire and delights in making others suffer watching what they care most be destroyed before their eyes. Oacus was summoned by Fallow to destroy Lief's group when they are making their way to the Valley of Lost and take the gems they've already collected. Though he nearly succeed, Dain's interference allows Lief's group to escape from him. Using Neridah to lead him to them, Oacus holds her hostage after taking the stolen diamond from her. However, his plan failed with the group having all seven gems. He makes a final move to catch them when they are being taken to Del by Steven, with Nevets holding the sorcerer at bay. In the end, after being hit by the Toran charm in Jasmine's possession, Oacus dies as his body spontaneously combusts.

=== Laughing Jack ===
Also known as Captain James Gant, captain of the gambling ship The Lady Luck, Laughing Jack is a pirate captain. He makes his customers sign a paper that they cannot read, which states that they must pay back 3 times what they borrowed. Laughing Jack is Tom and Ava's brother, although they do not tell anyone this, except Lief and his companions, in a secret letter from Tom. He lives in a caravan that is disguised by magic (like Lief's cloak) and was given great powers of sorcery by his master, the Shadow Lord. Laughing Jack was told to stop the companions' quest, (he acted more like the Sister of the West's guardian than Doran the Dragonlover in Isle of the Dead), but failed, first when he encountered Steven at The Funnel (in the territory of the lapis lazuli) and then when he broke an oath he made in the past. He had promised in the presence of Verity, who was his prisoner, that he would not take a coin of his ill-gotten gold for himself as long as his crewmen must row the ship without oars. After breaking his oath (thanks to Jasmine) he was pulled into the ocean by his crew, who are now little more than animated cadavers, having plied at the oars for longer than mortal lifetime.

==== Scrawn ====
A rat-faced man wearing a woolen cap who was formerly a crew member on Laughing Jack's ship, The Lady Luck. He was persuaded to mutiny against the captain after they were unable to leave Bone Point, but was convinced to row, despite knowing the danger, when Laughing Jack promised the crew all the gold aboard the ship if they rowed until replacements came. However, shortly after he killed Verity, a storm (presumably brought by Verity's curse) struck and sank the ship, causing everyone except Laughing Jack (saved by the Shadow Lord) to drown. However, the crew was cursed to man the oars even in death, and had to do so.

==== Beef ====
A large man with an eye patch who was formerly a crew member on Laughing Jack's ship, The Lady Luck. He was persuaded to mutiny against the captain after they were unable to leave Bone Point, but was convinced to row, despite knowing the danger, when Laughing Jack promised the crew all the gold aboard the ship if they rowed until replacements came. When Coffin, the leader of the mutiny, refused, Beef killed him. However, shortly after Laughing Jack killed Verity, a storm (presumably brought by Verity's curse) struck and sank the ship, causing everyone except Laughing Jack (saved by the Shadow Lord) to drown. However, the crew was cursed to man the oars even in death, and had to do so.

==== Coffin ====
A man with crooked, peg-like teeth who was formerly a crew member on Laughing Jack's ship, The Lady Luck. He was very superstitious, and after they were trapped on the ocean for days when Red Han wouldn't put out the Bone Point light in exchange for his daughter's safety, came to believe Verity was a witch after the birds fed her. He eventually led a mutiny against Laughing Jack to allow the ship to leave. However, Laughing Jack revealed that they could already leave, but the men refused to row, as there was no wind to sail and they knew the danger. He was the only crew member not to agree to be given all the gold if they rowed until replacements came, realizing Laughing Jack was lying, but this simply resulted in Beef killing him. After the ship was struck by a storm, his body was knocked into the ocean.

=== The Guardians of the Gems ===
The Guardians are the ones that the Shadow Lord sent the Ak-Baba to deliver the seven gems of the Belt of Deltora to in order for them to keep them from falling into the hands of his enemies. Some of these beings are minions and allies of the Shadow Lord himself, such as Reeah and Gellick, while others are merely acting on their own accord, such as Gorl the Knight and the Glus (in The Maze of the Beast). In whatever way they are connected to the Shadow Lord, all of the Guardians are terrible and getting the gems from them is no easy task. Each of the Guardians (except for the Hive) appeared on the covers of their respective books.

==== Gorl ====
Gorl is a knight from Jalis in golden armor with a pair of horns on the top of his helmet, referenced as The Knight of Truth. Years before Adin united the people and created the Belt of Deltora, Gorl and his two brothers were searching for the Lillies of Life, whose abundant nectar had healing properties and bestow long life. Finding it in the Forests of Silence, the three became its guardians before Gorl slayed his brothers for the magical nectar. As a result, centuries passed as Gorl awaited from the Lillies to bloom again, unknowingly preventing it by tending to the vines that blocked sunlight and murdering anyone and anything that got too close. Furthermore, while driven insane and paranoid, unaware that the hilt of blade had the topaz on it when Lief and Barda came for it and believed them to be after the Lillies of Life. When he engages in combat, he can use telepathic or magical powers to bend people to his will or mesmerize them. Eventually with Jasmine's help, Gorl's armor was crushed by a large tree branch, though he barely survived it in the anime and his armor crumbled as he tries to reach the bloomed Lillies of Life. In both versions, it turned out that Gorl's body decayed a long time ago and it was his warped consciousness controlling the armor until the tree branch damaged it to the point that the suit could no longer hold him and thus ceased to be.

==== Soldeen ====
A demonic sea monster who guards the ruby, resembling a mix of an eel, a catfish and a shark. Soldeen was once Nanion, the leader of the D'or Tribe. With his wife turned to stone, Nanion and his people were transformed into various creatures residing in the Lake of Tears created by Thaegan. Though he battles Lief, Soldeen regains his memories as Nanion and helps in getting the ruby before Thaegan arrives. Upon her death, the Lake dries up and both Nanion and his people are restored to their original forms.

Soldeen was the monster that inspired Josef to write and publish The Deltora Book of Monsters and is the first monster featured in the book. Soldeen is also the first guardian monster who isn't killed, although since there is some speculation that Thaegan may be the true guardian this assumption may or may not be true.

==== Reeah ====
Reeah is an evil and giant snake monster that was bred by the Ra-Kacharz on orders from the Shadow Lord to guard the opal that was placed on the crown which sits on Reeah's head. In the anime, Reeah was hydra-like with two additional eyeless heads that function as his limbs. Reeah originally dwelled in the sewers and cellars of Hira, feeding on the rats while growing to his current size as his food source became so numerous that they overran the city and so the people were forced to leave and founded Noradz elsewhere, leaving Reeah to claim the renamed City of Rats as his domain, with an abundant food supply. Reeah is a very vain creature due to his position of guarding the opal, enabling him to see into the future and possibly use some form of telepathy as well, seeing into the minds of his prey and manipulating them. Reeah attempts giving Lief a mental command to give him the Belt of Deltora, which would have been followed if not for the mind-clearing powers of the topaz. Though this results in a fight, Lief manages to kill Reeah with Jasmine's help and get the opal. Ironically, Reeah's corpse becomes food for the very rats that he fed on as the three heroes departed the city.

==== The Hive ====
One of the most ancient and mysterious of Deltoran monsters, the Hive is a vast community of underground bee-like invertebrates. Though their individual forms are unknown due to being the size of grains, the Hive as a whole resemble a large cloud of red sand which acts under one mind. The Hive played a part in creating the Shifting Sands from its dead, being an omnipresent entity within the desert and using their buzzing to draw living creatures into their domain and be compelled to go to the Hive. Such a case happened to a Mere woman named Rigane, who spent her life living on the outskirts of the desert and studying the fauna of the desert. From there, the Hive would demand an item to be of tribute, dragging it underground to be added to their nest, composed of bones, gold, gems and other nonperishing oddments.

The Hive then became the guardian of the lapis lazuli and the jewel became a cornerstone of the nest. When Lief was unable to fall under their spell due to the Topaz, the Hive made attempts to take the Belt of Deltora from him. Lief entered the cone in the center of the desert to retrieve the gem while Barda and Jasmine calmed the hive by using smoke, managing to retrieve both the lapis lazuli and Jasmine's dagger.

==== Gellick ====
Gellick is an overgrown toad who the Shadow Lord placed upon the task of guarding the emerald that was embedded on his forehead. Offering protection to them from the Shadow Lord, unaware of the toad's relation to him, the Dread Gnomes become Gellick's slaves and caretakers, tending to his every need and feeding him flies in return for a bit of the venomous slime he excretes which they use in their poisonous arrows. However, the Dread Gnomes unknowingly bring the rest of the slime to the foot of Dread Mountain once a month for the Grey Guards to collect and use to make their blisters. After receiving safe passage to the treasure cave where Gellick dwelled, Lief and his group attempted to kill the monster using the blister they found, only to learn of Gellick's relation to the Shadow Lord as the toad can not be affected by his own poison. Though Gellick's hide is too tough for their weapons to pierce through, Lief still had some water from the Dreaming Spring and tossed some down the throat of the toad. Because he was an evil creature, Gellick suffers the spring water's enchantment and turns into a tree.

==== The Glus ====
A giant white-skinned slug-like sea worm with blue glowing stripes, 8 eyes and 28 teeth, its name being an anagram of "slug". It is also known as The Beast or Deathspinner, the former as it is the monster dwelling within the cavern known as the Maze of the Beast and thus guardian of the amethyst. Though not in relation to the Shadow Lord or any of his creations, Glus is still a dangerous creature in its own right due to the strong glue-webbing it shoots from its mouth that hardens like cement within seconds. Though there are many ideas on the origins of Glus, the most well known is a Tenna birdsong tale of "Little Enna" that tells of the young girl who found a smooth stone that hatched a "sweet sea worm". But when ordered by her frighten mother to send the newborn creature back into the sea, Enna decided to run away and be with the worm as she is tripped by a wave of water and fell into a cavity which became the Maze of the Beast. Though years of being in the dark rendered it blind, Glus is attracted by any noise or movement within the maze it fashioned over the years with the remains of previous victims. Using the fine hairs on its underbelly to feel movement, but unable to move at fast speeds, Glus uses its glue-like substance to slow down its victim and devour him. In the anime, Glus was also shown to have rapid-healing abilities and its body is elastic, able to squeeze through tight crevices.

It is revealed that Ranesh encountered the Glus by a group of pirates that captured him and the crew of the ship that he was working on long before he met Josef. During this time, the pirates threw the ship's captain into the Maze of the Beast and Ranesh was lowered on a rope into the maze to see what kind of fate he suffered if he refused to cooperate with the pirates. Glus was shown capturing the captain in its tendrils but Ranesh was pulled out just before Glus came upon the doomed captain. The only victim in the series is Milne, a pirate that was betrayed by his fellow pirates. Lief, Barda and Jasmine also were forced to encounter this monster when they were thrown into the Maze of the Beast by the pirates and to find the amethyst. Fortunately they were able to figure out Glus' blindness and evaded it by walking slowly through the maze. Furthermore, Lief realizes the monster seeing the preservation of its lair is more important than food, carving out a fissure in the side of a wall that lead outside that forced Glus to ignore Barda and Jasmine as it quickly closes the hole instead of chasing after its prey. In the anime, after being tricked into causing a cave-in by Lief so he can get the amethyst, Glus focused its attention on stopping the cave-in as Lief and company escape through the fissure, with the monster apparently crushed under the falling debris.

==== Fardeep ====
Of the Mere tribe, with a love for games and riddles, Fardeep was the original owner of Champion Inn until the Shadow Lord took Rithmere over and forced the man out of his life of luxury. By the time he arrives in another patch of land to find peace, the Shadow Lord had seeped into the man's mind a chance to regain his fortune. Fardeep surrenders to this desire, which causes him to become the Guardian of the diamond. His four greatest vices, "Pride", "Envy", "Greed" and "Hate", manifest as demons attached to him through cords of flesh. Though each is named after a sin, one of each demon pair acts out the sin of its counterpart. Soon after, Fardeep begins to give those who seek the diamond a chance to win it in a game of choice. Usually, those who fail become ghosts and are forced to become his disciples, thus giving his realm the name Valley of the Lost. Among his disciples are the people of Tora, as a result of them breaking their vow to come to the Deltoran royal family's aid. One of his most sinister riddles is to guess the name the Shadow Lord gave him. Guessing correctly would open the way to the diamond or a door leading to a casket of gold. As seen in Doom's case, this ploy was intended to cause seekers of the diamond to become disillusioned with the Deltoran Royal Family, to the point of ignoring their reward and losing all faith in Deltora's king.

It is also revealed that Ranesh had also encountered the Guardian before he met Josef. Ranesh told Josef that Fardeep had challenged him to win a casket of gold, however Ranesh did not want to risk his freedom, feeling it was more valuable than mere money. The Guardian allowed him to leave and said that it was not a big loss since he would be gaining many more disciples soon (which may have meant that he knew Tora's people would all soon become his disciples). When Lief, Barda and Jasmine challenge the Guardian to the game that gave them the opportunity to win the diamond, he promises that he would allow the group to take possession of whatever item was contained inside a golden casket within a glass room, and that the casket was where the diamond of the Belt of Deltora was contained. To gain entry, they needed to figure out the Guardian's name. The Guardian only gave a small sample of clues (though in reality, he had been giving them subtle hints the whole time they were talking) that would lead them to the clues they needed to find, inside the Guardian's palace. He hinted that the riddle they needed to help solve his name was hidden but also so out in the open that it was right in front of their noses. As it turned out, the riddle could be found by looking inside a mirror in the Guardian's chamber, and read: "My secret name awaits within. My first the first of Pride's great sin. My second and my last begin, The sum of errors in the twin. My third begins a sparkle of bright-The treasure pure? The point of light? My fourth, the sum of happiness, For those who try my name to guess." Through subtle hints, the group discovered that Greed was the monster of hatred, Envy was the monster of pride, Hate was the monster of greed and Pride was the monster of Envy. From this, they realised that the first letter of the Guardian's name was the letter "E". The other clues the group found were around the palace. Lief figured out that the fourth letter was the letter "O", since the sum of the happiness that was brought to everyone who tried to guess his name was "0". Barda then figured out the third letter of the name when the group found a window with designs of stars and diamonds on it. Because of his former life as a palace guard, he was able to decode the pattern in the design and see that the last missing shape to be filled in (and the clue they needed) was a diamond. Hence the third letter of the Guardian's name was a "D".

The group solved the final two letters (the second and fifth) after finding two portraits of a hermit, which appeared to be identical but on closer inspection had several small differences. When the group counted up the number of differences they found eight ("E"), which meant that the Guardian's name and the password to the chamber containing the casket was "EEDOE". However, just before Lief was about to speak the name, he noticed a final ninth difference in the portraits, which meant that the Guardian's name was in fact "ENDON". When they returned to claim the diamond, Lief discovered that the diamond within the casket was not the real diamond, as the Belt of Deltora does not react to it. The real diamond had in fact been stolen by Neridah. Furthermore, when the Guardian tried to take the Belt of Deltora for himself, the lapis lazuli negated the magic that allowed him to control his pets and they began to attack their former master. Lief saved him by severing the cords that connected the demons to the Guardian, causing them to wither and die. After this, the Guardian told Lief where to find Neridah and the real diamond and fainted. When Lief reclaimed the real diamond, the Valley of the Lost was purified and its inhabitants forgiven for their betrayal and returned to their living forms. The Guardian also returned to his original form as Fardeep. Fardeep served as a useful aid in Return to Del, as he is a pure-blood Meresman and therefore a descendant of the original Deltorans.

=== The Guardians of the Four Sisters ===
Just as the gems of Deltora had Guardians in Deltora Quest, the Four Sisters each had a guardian to defend them. Doran was made into such a guardian against his will. These guardians included:

==== Rolf the Capricon ====
A Capricon and servant of the Shadow Lord, Rolf is the Guardian of the East who is first encountered in the Os-Mine Hills. In series three, he is captured by Granous and saved by Lief and his companions. He takes the form of the ruby dragon and destroys the companions' escort. He tries to destroy the companions when they reach Dragon's Nest, but is defeated by the true ruby dragon, Joyeu. Rolf is most likely king of Capra as he claimed he was "heir to the lordship of Capra". The riddle protecting him is Strangers do not pass this way! All are doomed who disobey. Turn your faces to the west. Death awaits in Dragons Nest.

==== Kirsten of Shadowgate ====
A woman that Barda, Lief and Jasmine discover in a castle in the mountains. She was Mariette's sister and Bede's girlfriend until Bede fell in love with Mariette and chose her sister over her. This made Kirsten bitter with resentment and so she allied herself to the Shadow Lord for vengeance. The Shadow Lord gave Kirsten evil magical powers and thus she became the Masked One, now a sorceress with the appearance of a black-cloaked figure with a green mask and pale hands that could kill others just by touching them. She used her power to enslave Bede and imprison Mariette in her locket. She also had the power to conjure phantoms of herself in Deltora, a technique she used to try and murder her enemies. In return she was given the task of guarding the Sister of the North. When Lief, Barda and Jasmine went to her castle, they at first thought that she is under Bede's power, however Bede was able to clue them in with his song, using the words: "Kirsten is evil. I am her prisoner. Help me!". Kirsten almost killed Barda and Jasmine when she caused the walls of her castle to swallow them. However, as Lief jumped into the snake pit that the Sister of the North was contained, the snakes in the pit latched onto her and bit her, killing her with their venom. The snakes in the pit kept away from Lief, because he had the ruby, which goes against snake venom. The riddle protecting her is Do not enter this domain! Flee this realm of fear and pain! Death and terror both await, the wretch who enters Shadowgate!

==== Doran the Dragonlover ====
Also known as "Dragonfriend" by the dragons, Doran is said to be Deltora's greatest explorer and was a kind and noble man. He developed everlasting friendships with Deltora's dragons and even explored Deltora's underworld and befriended the Pirran people that had sheltered themselves there. When the Ak-Baba killed nearly all of the dragons of Deltora, Doran went to each of the remaining dragons and had them swear an oath to go into a deep hibernation until the King of Deltora came and awakened the dragons using the Belt of Deltora. He also made them promise not to take advantage of the other dragons' hibernation and not to invade their territories. After the dragons went into hibernation, Doran found out that the dragons were an obstacle to the Shadow Lord's plan to plant the Four Sisters throughout Deltora and by having the dragons go into hibernation, Doran had removed this obstacle once and for all. Doran then drew a map to where the Four Sisters were located and asked the map to be delivered to the king, but the people of Deltora thought he was crazy and his map was torn into four pieces, each piece marked with the Shadow Lord's brand. Doran then went into the wilderness to find another way to get rid of the Sisters and was never seen again. It was revealed later on that the Shadow Lord had captured Doran and as punishment for resisting him, Doran was forced to become the immortal vessel of the Sister of the West (having the Sister contained inside his own body) and thus he was unwillingly forced to become the guardian of the Sister of the West. He became situated in the Kobb's lair on the Isle of the Dead. Lief and his group managed to finally meet him and Doran was saddened to discover that the diamond dragon was dead, but was overcome with joy when he found out her daughter still lived. Sadly, Veritas was forced to destroy Doran by stealing his breath in order to destroy the Sister of the West that he guarded, but knowing that the diamond dragon species still lived and that there was still hope for Deltora, Doran died a peaceful death as he disintegrated into dust. The riddle protecting him is If you pass, your fate is sealed. Ahead, pure evil lies concealed. Turn now, while you have life and breath. Flee now this realm of living death.

==== Paff ====
When Ranesh left to Tora, this young girl took his place as assistant librarian to Josef. But it is revealed she is a servant of The Shadow Lord and guardian of The Sister of the South. While Lief, Barda and Jasmine went in search of the hibernating dragons and the Four Sisters, Paff secretly slipped poison in Josef's food and drink, causing his health to deteriorate and become delusional, causing him to think that Doom did not trust him. Not only that, but she conjured the Black Mist, a bizarre monster made from darkness and had the heads of an eagle and a wild dog. Lief and Doom figure out her who she really was nearly at the end of the final book in the third series. Doom intended to kill her to put her out of her misery, but Lief wanted her alive for questioning. Out of her grief, Paff grabbed the Belt of Deltora and the belt's holy magic destroyed her. Paff apparently suffered from an inferiority complex: believing that no one truly loved her, she become a bitter misanthrope and eventually the Shadow Lord's servant. The riddle protecting her is Lose and win? Or win and lose? Royal coward, you must choose. Bow your head and creep away. Or you and yours will curse this day.

=== The Black Mist ===
The Black Mist is a monster that was conjured and controlled by Paff. It was a monster formed from darkness itself and was filled with hatred, spreading hate throughout Del. As its name implies, the Black Mist takes on the form of dark colored smoke or mist that easily slips through cracks in doors and walls, its physical form is a mass of black slime and tentacles with the head of a wild dog and an eagle. Its tentacles were as sharp as the blade of a sword and poisonous to touch. It was one of Lief's most challenging opponents, it took the combined might of Fidelis (the topaz dragon), Nevets and Lief and his friends to completely destroy it.

=== Grey Tide ===
The final opponent for the protagonists of Deltora. The Grey Tide is a massive, growing creature made of a gray, poisonous slime that lived deep beneath the center of The City of the Rats but was far above the Pirran Caverns. It is the enemy's secret weapon. It is awoken when all four Sisters are destroyed, to grow until its poison sweeps over all of Deltora, likely to make the country physically a part of the Shadowlands. The idea supposedly originated in a Tenna Birdsong Tale, in which the singing of four sisters kept a monster imprisoned until a sorcerer killed them. This sorcerer clearly is the Shadow Lord, whom it amused to watch his enemy re-enact the story and in the act annihilate his country. The Shadow Lord's plan was simple: if the Four Sisters remained, Deltora would starve. If they were destroyed, the chemical substance would spread all the way across Deltora, smothering the land and killing every living thing (making it checkmate). The only weapon against it was dragon fire. Therefore, Lief summoned Veritas, Hopian, Forta, Fortuna, Fidelis, Honora, and Joyeu to burn it away. The Ak-Baba were sent to defend the Grey Tide, but they were defeated by the dragons and their bodies became consumed by the Grey Tide as well. Before it could grow too large, the dragons managed to burn the Grey Tide, causing it to wither and die.

=== The Four Sisters ===
The original four sisters were women who lived on an island west of Deltora's coast, called the Isle of the Four Sisters, and had voices as sweet, as their hearts were pure. Their names were Flora, Viva, Aqua and Terra and had lived on the island for so long, they had forgotten the number of years. A sorcerer (confirmed to be the Shadow Lord in Tales of Deltora) came sailing from far away, looking for lands to conquer, heard their songs and despised them because he hated all things beautiful and good. So he seized and imprisoned them on the corners of the island but still they sang together, so now he was crazed by rage and went to all corners and struck each sister, one by one. After Terra's voice ceased, the sorcerer not realizing what he had done, for in the center of the island slept a vile and hideous creature that had slept on soothed by the sister's singing, when the singing stopped, then it awoke enraged and lay waste to the island, fouling the stream and crushing the smaller beasts and cracking the very rock upon which the island rested causing the island to sink beneath the waves, but the sorcerer escaped to conquer new lands

Years later, in his attempts to conquer Deltora, the Shadow Lord created creatures he ironically dubbed 'The Four Sisters' in mocking tribute to the originals. Indeed, these new four sisters were part of a plan that acted as a dark parody of the original sisters' story. The Four Sisters are first mentioned through the Shadow Lord's crystal when it showed Lief, Barda, Jasmine and Doom a recording of a Chief Advisor called Drumm, speaking to the Shadow Lord. The Sisters were placed in different locations and were guarded. The first Sister to be killed was the Sister of the East in Dragon's Nest by the ruby dragon, Joyeu, the second was the Sister of the North in Shadowgate by the emerald dragon, Honora, the third was the Sister of the West in Isle of the Dead by the amethyst dragon, Veritas and the final one was the Sister of the South in Del which was attacked by the topaz dragon, Fidelis, Steven and Nevets. The Sister of the East is described to be a glowing, pulsating red egg that was poisonous, flaring yellow and so bright it seemed to hurt eyes. The Sister of the North is described to be a snake with no eyes, tongue and fangs. It was also pale and bloated, striped with thin lines of poisonous yellow. It dwelled in the Masked One's snake pit. The Sister of the West was described as a rippling, jelly-like thing, creamy white and veined with pink and grey and dwelled inside the body of Doran. The Sister of the South was described as a corrupt version of the seven great talismans in the Belt of Deltora, it was the same size and shape but gray in color and it inspired feelings of greed and sorrow in people nearby, including Lief himself though he was able to resist it. The Sister of the South was placed inside the church at the castle at Del, further feeding the feelings of grief for visitors mourning the deaths of their loved ones.
