= Bardeh, Kerman =

Bardeh بارده
- Village
- Location within Iran
- Coordinates: 28°28′02″N 58°12′36″E
- Country: Iran
- Province: Kerman
- County: Anbarabad
- Bakhsh: Jebalbarez-e Jonubi
- Rural District: Garmsar

Population (2006)
  - Total: 494
- Time zone: UTC+3:30 (IRST)
  - Summer (DST): UTC+4:30 (IRDT)

Bardeh (Persian: بارده, also Romanized as Bārdeh) is a village in Garmsar Rural District, Jebalbarez-e Jonubi District, Anbarabad County, Kerman Province, Iran. At the 2006 census, its population was 494, in 90 families.
