= Edvīns Bārda =

Latvian footballer (1900–1947)

Edvīns Johans Bārda (19 April 1900 in Riga – 28 September 1947 in Liverpool) was a Latvian footballer and manager, the eldest and most popular of the four football-playing Bārda brothers.

== Biography ==
Edvīns Bārda started his career in 1921 when he joined JKS Riga – the strongest Latvian football club at the time. He played with the side in 1921 and 1922, in 1922 he also took up coaching the team. Later in 1922 he played briefly with ASK Riga until he ended up with the newly founded RFK – the leader in Latvian football in the years to follow, plus he actively participated in the formation of the club in its early years. Along with his brother Arvīds he was selected to play in the first ever international match for Latvia on 24 September 1922. Just two minutes into the friendly match against the Estonia national football team, Edvīns Bārda scored the first ever goal for Latvia national football team. In total between 1922 and 1925 Edvīns Bārda played eight international matches for Latvia scoring five goals, including Latvia's participation at the 1924 Summer Olympics.

Edvīns Bārda, the goal hungry forward who was always battling for every inch on the pitch, was a fan favourite. With RFK he won two Latvian championships in 1924 and 1925. In 1926 Bārda took up coaching Hakoah Riga and a football club in Jelgava, but in 1927 he played again on the field with Amatieris. In later years for some time he was also the coach of SSS Riga.

In 1933 Edvīns Bārda participated in a match of club veterans against the RFK youth squad to celebrate the 10th anniversary of RFK.

Edvīns Bārda died at the age of 47 in Liverpool.
