= Deltora Quest =

Deltora Quest may refer to:

- Deltora Quest (book series), collectively, three series of children's fantasy books by Emily Rodda, as well as the companion books to the series
  - Deltora Quest (Deltora Quest 1), the original eight-book series
  - Deltora Shadowlands (Deltora Quest 2), the second series (three books)
  - Dragons of Deltora (Deltora Quest 3), the third and final series (four books)
- Deltora Quest (anime), Japanese anime series based on Rodda's book series
