= The Maze of the Beast =

2001 Book by Jennifer Rowe (as Emily Rodda)

- Author: Emily Rodda
- Illustrator: Marc McBride
- Cover artist: Marc McBride
- Language: English
- Series: Deltora Quest
- Genre: Fantasy
- Publisher: Scholastic
- Publication date: 2001
- Publication place: Australia
- Media type: Print (Paperback)
- Pages: 129
- ISBN: 0-439-25328-4
- OCLC: 47835990
- LC Class: CPB Box no. 1857 vol. 21
- Preceded by: Dread Mountain
- Followed by: The Valley of the Lost

The Maze of the Beast is the sixth book in the Deltora Quest novel series, written by Emily Rodda. It was published in 2001 by Scholastic.

== Plot summary ==
Lief, Barda, and Jasmine leave Dread Mountain in search of the next gem at the Maze of the Beast, travelling along the River Tor. During their travel, they encounter a pair of children drowning in a stream and rescue them, but a boy shoots one of the children dead and the other almost strangles Barda to death, revealing the children to be Ols, shapeshifters created by the Shadow Lord. Lief saves Barda by impaling the Ol through the heart, and Jasmine identifies the boy as Dain, the serving boy who aided Doom in The Shifting Sands. As Lief injured Dain when he attacked him for shooting the Ol, they offer to travel with him to the Resistance stronghold. Once there, Dain collapses before he can tell Lief, Barda or Jasmine the password to enter, though Lief is able to deduce it from a note left outside. Once they arrive they meet Jinks, a former acrobat who knows Barda and who stirs up trouble between the trio and Glock until Doom returns. Jasmine and Doom quickly argue over Doom's past, but Lief's casual observation that the Resistance uses Queen Bee Honey to heal from Ol attacks causes Doom to have them imprisoned to determine they are not Ols.

After three days pass, during which Ols would waver in a process dubbed "the Tremor", the trio have still not been released, so Dain frees them with the promise they will take him to Tora, where he believes his parents have sought refuge, only to learn they do not intend to visit Tora. Jasmine, Kree and Filli separate from the group to make them less recognizable, promising to meet them at the coast. Lief, Barda and Dain soon encounter Steven, a peddler and son of Queen Bee who travels with his brother Nevets within him, and purchase goods from him, including a fabric belt with which to conceal the Belt of Deltora from Dain. They also find the ruins of the town Where Waters Meet, destroyed by pirate attacks led by Finn, Nak and Milne.

At the River Tor, Lief, Barda and Dain board a passenger boat, and soon realize that Jasmine is also aboard in disguise as a wealthy young woman. Pirates attack the boat that night, capturing Dain, taking the concealed Belt of Deltora, and knocking Barda into the dangerous waters of the River Tor, but Jasmine fends them off, revealing her identity and altering an Ol that was also on the ship, prompting the pirates to flee. The steamer's captain kills the Ol and kicks Lief and Jasmine off the ship, having realized it was looking for her. Afterwards, Barda rejoins them, having survived his fall into the river, and finds the body of the pirate he was fighting with a map to the Maze of the Beast. They follow the map to a cave and find it ransacked, with another note addressed to Finn from Doom, instructing him where to find the gem. Barda believes their quest has failed, but is suddenly killed by another Barda - the Barda who had been with them had been another Ol.

The pirates then capture Lief, Barda and Jasmine, reuniting them with Dain, who the pirates have been divided over giving to the Grey Guards out of fear of retaliation from Doom, leading to one of their number, Milne, being imprisoned with them. Lief is able to retrieve the Belt of Deltora from Finn by bribing the polypan the pirates captured with toffee he purchased from Steven before Lief, Barda, Jasmine, and Milne are thrown into the Maze of the Beast to be fed to the slug-like Glus. The Glus attacks Milne, who flees into the Maze, and Lief, Barda and Jasmine explore the Maze slowly to avoid alerting the Glus. Eventually Lief finds the gem has not been removed from the Maze due to the Belt sensing it in a column, and Jasmine and Barda lead the Glus away to give Lief time to excavate the gem, revealed to be the amethyst, whose calming power helps Lief retrieve it and find an exit in the Maze leading to a blowhole. Lief accidentally begins to flood the Maze and escapes with Barda and Jasmine just in time; the Glus seals the Maze behind them to prevent it from flooding. Finn and Nak confront them after they escape the blowhole, but it blows and drags the two pirates back into its depths. Afterwards, the trio discuss the false map planted by an Ol, before preparing to find the last gem - the diamond - at the Valley of the Lost.

== Characters ==
- Lief: Lief is the main character of the series. As a child Lief roamed the streets of Del, sharpening his wits and gaining him the skills needed for his future quests. On his sixteenth birthday it is revealed to him that he must begin a dangerous quest to find the lost gems of the Belt of Deltora.
- Barda: Barda was enlisted to help find the lost gems of Deltora before the initial story takes place. For the next sixteen years, Barda disguised himself as a beggar so as to discover information vital to the quest..
- Jasmine: Jasmine is a wild girl, described as having wild black hair and emerald green eyes, who has grown up in the Forests of Silence, where Lief and Barda meet her shortly after leaving Del. She can understand the language of the trees and of many animals, and has incredibly sharp senses, but has trouble understanding some social customs. Jasmine is usually seen with her raven, Kree, and a mouse-like creature she calls Filli. Jasmine is like Lief and occasionally has a quick temper. After helping Lief and Barda in the forest and with the help of the topaz, she is greeted by her mother's spirit from beyond the grave, who tells her to go with Lief and Barda in their quest. After this encounter, she joins Lief and Barda in the search for the great gems that will complete the Belt.
- Kree: Kree is a raven and one of Jasmine's closest companions in the Forest of Silence. His family was taken and eaten by the witch Thaegan, and Kree was found by Jasmine. She took pity on him, as both had their family taken away, and she took care of Kree. Kree treats Jasmine as his master, and does not tolerate offensive behavior towards Jasmine. His presence is advantageous towards the three companions, as he is able to fly ahead and warn the others of oncoming danger or safety.
- Filli: Filli is a small, mouse-like creature (although Jasmine denies that he resembles any rodent). He was rescued by Jasmine when she discovered him paralyzed by the Wenn in The Forests of Silence. As such, he remains close to Jasmine and Kree, often hiding himself in Jasmine's clothing when danger arises. Like Kree, Jasmine is able to understand Filli. His small size is often advantageous to Lief, Barda and Jasmine, as he is able to hide easily and eavesdrop on others.
- The Glus: The Glus is the Guardian of the amethyst. It resembles a giant blue slug. It lives in the cavern called the Maze of the Beast. It cannot see, so relies on its hearing to survive.
- Dain: Dain is a timid young boy. He saves Lief, Barda, and Jasmine from the Ols. Through the series he shows feelings for Jasmine, making Lief jealous.

== See also ==
- Deltora series
- Deltora Quest (anime)
