= Quest 3 =

Quest 3 or Quest III may refer to:

- Deltora Quest 3, a series of children's fantasy books
- Dragon Quest III, a 1988 role-playing video game
- King's Quest III, third installment in the King's Quest series of graphic adventure games
- Meta Quest 3, a virtual reality headset developed by Reality Labs
- Police Quest III: The Kindred, a 1991 police procedural point-and-click adventure video game
- Space Quest III, a 1989 graphic adventure game
