= Shifting Sands =

Shifting Sands can refer to:

- The Shifting Sands, a book in the Deltora Quest series
- Shifting Sands (1918 film)
- Shifting Sands (1922 film)
- Shifting Sands (album), by David Wright
- "Shifting Sands", a 1957 episode of The Goon Show
- "Shifting Sands" (Pole to Pole with Michael Palin), a 1992 television episode
- "Shifting Sands" (Soldier Soldier), a 1993 television episode
- Forms of equivocation, a logical fallacy
