= The Lake of Tears =

2001 children's fantasy novel by Jennifer Rowe (as Emily Rodda)

- First edition
- Author: Emily Rodda
- Cover artist: Marc McBride
- Language: English
- Series: Deltora Quest
- Genre: Fantasy novel
- Publisher: Scholastic
- Publication date: 2001
- Publication place: Australia
- Media type: Print (Paperback)
- Pages: 129
- ISBN: 0-439-25324-1
- OCLC: 46426946
- LC Class: CPB Box no. 1858 vol. 18
- Preceded by: The Forests of Silence
- Followed by: City of the Rats

The Lake of Tears is the second book in the eight-volume Deltora Quest series written by Emily Rodda. It continues after the events of The Forests of Silence, as the three protagonists brave various dangers on their journey to find the seven missing gems of Deltora. The book was first published in 2001 by Scholastic.

== Plot summary ==
Following the events of The Forests of Silence, which saw the topaz retrieved by Lief, Barda, and Jasmine, they continue to the Lake of Tears to retrieve the next gem, though they have disagreements over how to proceed, as Jasmine is reluctant to enter the land surrounding the Lake owing to its control by the evil sorceress Thaegan. They soon encounter a giant guarding a bridge, who has been bound by Thaegan to do so until "truth and lies are one", and refuses to allow them to pass unless they answer his riddles. Although Jasmine and Barda answer successfully, Lief fails to answer his riddle, an arithmetic problem based around Thaegan and her children inhabiting a cave, as he had not known her favorite food to be a raven swallowed whole. The giant gives Lief another riddle to answer as punishment for failure, to decide how he will die by telling the truth or a lie, and Lief states that his fate will be that he is beheaded, the fate he would suffer if he had lied, creating a liar paradox and freeing the giant, who returns to his true form of a giant bird and saves Lief when the bridge crumbles under him to repay his debt to him. Lief deduces Jasmine's concern over crossing Thaegan's territory is for Kree, who Jasmine confirms to be the sole survivor of an attack on his family by Thaegan. She sends him back to the Forests of Silence for his protection.

As the companions travel through the countryside they rescue a man named Manus from the Shadow Lord's Grey Guards. The companions, with Manus, escape from the Grey Guards only to fall into a ring of quicksand surrounding a house. While Lief, Barda and Jasmine are rescued by the old couple inhabiting it, Lief soon realizes they are really Jin and Jod, two of Thaegan's thirteen children, his mind having pierced their illusions through touching the topaz, which has the power to strengthen and clear the mind. Manus arrives to help rescue them, and they manage to find hidden stepping stones in the quicksand to escape. Jasmine is injured during the escape, but rescued by Kree's intervention, and she tricks Jin and Jod into sinking into the quicksand after moving the leaves that disguised the stepping stones before healing Kree's wing with nectar from the Lilies of Life.

Using his own written language, Manus reveals he is from the city of Raladin. A century prior, Thaegan put a spell on Raladin that caused them and all of their offspring to never be able to speak after they spoke out against her cursing the city of D'Or to become the Lake of Tears. Manus had been captured and enslaved by Jin and Jod while seeking assistance from Del, and by the Grey Guards after escaping from them. They journey to the city of Raladin, where Manus hopes to find his people, but find the city empty upon arrival until Manus plays an abandoned flute. The remaining Ralads reveal themselves, having constructed a city underground, and give the companions shelter. After recovering, Lief, Barda, and Jasmine tell the Ralads that they must journey to the Lake of Tears, despite the Ralads' pleas and warning of both Thaegan's magic protecting her and a creature called "Soldeen", but they do not tell them they are going in quest of one of the gems of the Belt of Deltora. Manus agrees to be their guide.

When they get to the Lake of Tears, they are attacked by Soldeen, a giant fish-like creature, and Lief barely fends him off. The group are left demoralized by the task of getting past Soldeen to get to the gem, and Lief asks Manus to play his flute to cheer them up. The music also soothes Soldeen, who approaches the group and agrees to give them the gem in exchange for Manus. Although Manus is willing, Lief, Barda and Jasmine refuse, and Soldeen uses his spines to grab Lief, resulting in his touching the topaz and reminding him of who he was before Thaegan cursed him. His mind cleared, Soldeen agrees to help them get the gem and takes Lief to the weeping rock at the center of the Lake, where Lief retrieves a pink gem that he deduces to be the ruby, paled by the danger of the Lake. The ruby then pales further, heralding the arrival of Thaegan, who smites Soldeen and causes the ruby to fall into the weeping rock. Thaegan easily defeats the group with her magic and prepares to kill, but Kree attacks the one spot on Thaegan's body unarmored by magic: the little finger she uses to cast her spells, drawing blood and killing her. With Thaegan's death, all her spells are broken: the Ralads can now speak and the Lake of Tears and its denizens turn back into the city and citizens of D'Or. Soldeen returns to his true form as Nanion, king of D'Or and gives the three companions the ruby, with him and Manus learning of the quest to restore the Belt of Deltora and the fall of Deltora to the Shadow Lord. They offer Lief, Barda, Jasmine and Manus safe harbor, but the companions opt to return to Raladin before resuming their quest.

== Characters ==
- Lief: Lief is the main character of the series. Lief was born to parents Jared and Anna of the Forge. As a child Lief roamed the streets of Del, sharpening his wits and gaining him the skills needed for his future quests. Though he did not know it, he was constantly protected by Barda and he prided himself on his many 'lucky' escapes. On his sixteenth birthday it is revealed to him that he must begin a dangerous quest to find the lost gems of the Belt of Deltora.
- Jasmine: Jasmine is a wild girl, described as having wild black hair and emerald green eyes who has grown up in the Forests of Silence, where Lief and Barda meet her shortly after leaving Del. Her parents were captured by Grey Guards when she was seven years old, and so she has been raised by the forest. She can understand the language of the trees and of many animals, and has incredibly sharp senses, but has trouble understanding some social customs. Jasmine is usually seen with her raven, Kree, and a mouse-like creature she calls Filli. Jasmine is like Lief and occasionally has a quick temper. After helping Lief and Barda in the forest and with the help of the topaz, she is greeted by her mother's spirit from beyond the grave, who tells her to go with Lief and Barda in their quest. After this encounter, she joins Lief and Barda in the search for the great gems that will complete the Belt.
- Barda: Barda was enlisted as a friend by the king and queen of Deltora and was trusted to help him find the lost gems of Deltora sixteen years before the initial story took place. For the next sixteen years Barda disguised himself as a beggar so as to discover information vital to the quest. He also became the bodyguard of Lief, albeit without Lief's knowledge thereof. Upon Lief's sixteenth birthday Barda revealed himself to Lief and the quest for the gems of Deltora began. Though Barda was at first annoyed to travel encumbered by a child, he soon saw Lief as more of a help than a hindrance.

== See also ==
- Deltora series
- Deltora Quest anime
