= Return to Del =

2002 Book by Jennifer Rowe (as Emily Rodda)

- First edition
- Author: Emily Rodda
- Cover artist: Marc McBride
- Language: English
- Series: Deltora Quest
- Genre: Fantasy novel
- Publisher: Scholastic
- Publication date: 2002
- Publication place: Australia
- Media type: Print (Paperback)
- Pages: 136
- Preceded by: The Valley of the Lost
- Followed by: Cavern of the Fear

Return to Del is the eighth and final book of the original series of Deltora Quest written by Emily Rodda. With the Belt of Deltora completed, Lief, Barda and Jasmine seek Adin's heir, the only person who can use the Belt to banish the Shadow Lord from their land.

== Plot summary ==
Having completed the Belt of Deltora, Lief, Barda and Jasmine now seek the heir to the throne of Deltora, with their only clue being that the Belt itself will supposedly lead them to the heir. They reunite with Doom and Dain, who enter the Valley of the Lost after the released Torans cloak it in mist to prevent the Shadow Lord from discovering its liberation. Although they finally reveal the Belt to Doom and Dain, Lief, Barda and Jasmine attempt to leave the Valley on their own due to their suspicions of a Resistance spy, but find it guarded by the peddler Steven and his ferocious brother Nevets, and are only saved by Doom's intervention.

Lief and Dain deduce that they can find the heir by recreating the circumstances of the Belt's original completion, by symbolically reuniting the seven tribes of Deltora. They soon deduce they know a member of each tribe and send messages to have them meet at Withick Mire, a Resistance stronghold near Del. The Resistance divides to discreetly travel to Withick Mire, while three Torans, Peel, Kris and Lauren, disguise themselves as Lief, Barda and Jasmine and travel north to create the illusion that they have not yet reached the Valley of the Lost. The real Lief, Barda and Jasmine travel in Steven's wagon to Withick Mire, but encounter a checkpoint of Grey Guards. Steven directs them across a gripper field, unaware the trio do not know the grippers to be carnivorous plants with stones set in their fields for safe passage, and Barda is badly wounded, while they witness Nevets emerge from Steven for the first time to slaughter the Grey Guards. As they take refuge in a small cabin, they find the remains of a man, woman, and small child bearing a note from King Endon with the royal seal at the bottom, believing the royal family to have perished.

After they arrive at Withick Mire, Barda recovers long enough to explain that the note is a forgery due to the presence of the royal seal, which was kept in Prandine's possession and not Endon's, and the self-despairing language used in it. As Barda's condition continues to worsen, the representatives of the seven tribes all assemble: Lief for Del, Manus for the Ralads, Steven for the Plains, Fardeep for the Mere, Gla-Thon for the Dread Gnomes, Zeean of Tora, and Glock for the Jalis, and they each touch their tribe's talismans and learn that the heir is among them. Lief believes it to be Dain, whose name is an anagram of Adin, but they are attacked by Ichabod, the last of Sorceress Thaegan's children, who kidnaps Dain and takes him to Del, leaving only his dagger behind. Despite this, Barda suddenly begins to recover due to the Belt's magic.

Once again, the Resistance divides to head to Del to rescue Dain. However when Lief, Barda, Jasmine and Steven arrive, they learn that everyone except Doom has been captured to watch Dain's execution, causing them to suspect Doom was a traitor all along. Lief, Barda and Jasmine rescue Dain, but Steven and Nevets are abruptly captured and Dain reveals himself to be a Grade 3 Ol, having disguised himself as his own dagger and accompanied Lief to Del. Doom ambushes Dain, but Dain begins to strangle him and Lief uses the Belt of Deltora to kill Dain, before he, Barda and Jasmine escape with Doom to Lief's old home. There, Doom regains his memories and reveals that he is Jasmine's father, and that he and his wife escaped from Del and were refused aid by Tora. Lief and Barda believe Doom to be Endon and Jasmine to be the heir and give her the Belt, but it does not shine for her and Jasmine rejects it.

While Lief is thinking in his room, Grey Guards attack the forge and capture Barda, Jasmine and Doom. With only Kree to aid him, Lief uses the secret passage to enter the palace and attempts to rescue them, his parents, and the Resistance from execution. As he watches the proceedings, led by Fallow, Lief remembers a passage from the book The Belt of Deltora that his father showed him, and rearranges the gems in the Belt so that their initials spell Deltora (Diamond, Emerald, Lapis Lazuli, Topaz, Opal, Ruby, and Amethyst). A fight between the captives and Lief's father is mortally wounded by Fallow as Lief tries to give the Belt to Jasmine. Lief is forced to put the Belt back on to fight efficiently, and the Belt's powers flare to life, banishing the Shadow Lord and saving the kingdom of Deltora, revealing that Lief is the heir to Deltora.

It is revealed that Endon and Sharn switched places with Jarred and Anna, believing no-one would suspect the king and queen of Deltora could work as a simple blacksmith and wife. Endon dies from his injuries, and Jasmine expresses relief that she wasn't the heir, but Lief asks her to stay with him and help them rebuild the country.

== Characters ==
- Lief: Lief is the main character of the series. Lief was born to parents King Endon and Queen Sharn though he believed them to be Jarred and Anna of the forge. As a child Lief roamed the streets of Del, sharpening his wits and gaining him the skills needed for his future quests. Though he did not know it, he was constantly protected by Barda and he prided himself on his many 'lucky' escapes. On his sixteenth birthday it is revealed to him that he must begin a dangerous quest to find the lost gems of the Belt of Deltora.
- Barda: Barda was enlisted as a friend by the king and queen of Deltora and was trusted to help him find the lost gems of Deltora sixteen years before the initial story took place. For the next sixteen years Barda disguised himself as a beggar so as to discover information vital to the quest. He also became the bodyguard of Endon and Sharn's child Lief, albeit without the semi-arrogant Lief's knowledge thereof. Upon Lief's sixteenth birthday Barda revealed himself to Lief and the quest for the gems of Deltora began. Though Barda was at first annoyed to travel encumbered by a child, he soon saw Lief as more of a help than a hindrance. Leif is found to be the true heir to the throne.
- Jasmine: Jasmine is a wild girl, described as having wild black hair (dark green hair in the anime) and emerald green eyes who has grown up in the Forests of Silence, where Lief and Barda meet her shortly after leaving Del. Her parents, were captured by Grey Guards when she was seven years old, and so she has been raised by the forest. She can understand the language of the trees and of many animals, and has incredibly sharp senses, but has trouble understanding some social customs. Jasmine is usually seen with her raven, Kree, and a mouse-like creature she calls Filli. Jasmine is like Lief and occasionally has a quick temper. After helping Lief and Barda in the forest and with the help of the topaz, she is greeted by her mother's spirit from beyond the grave, who tells her to go with Lief and Barda in their quest. After this encounter, she joins Lief and Barda in the search for the great gems that will complete the Belt.
- Kree: Kree is a raven and one of Jasmine's closest companions in the Forest of Silence. His family was taken and eaten by the witch Thaegan, and Kree was found by Jasmine. She took pity on him, as both had their family taken away, and she took care of Kree. Kree treats Jasmine as his master, and does not tolerate offensive behavior towards Jasmine. His presence is advantageous towards the three companions, as he is able to fly ahead and warn the others of oncoming danger or safety.
- Filli: Filli is a small, mouse-like creature (although Jasmine denies that he resembles any rodent) called a Siskis. He was rescued by Jasmine when she discovered him paralyzed by the Wenn in The Forests of Silence. As such, he remains close to Jasmine and Kree, often hiding himself in Jasmine's clothing when danger arises. Like Kree, Jasmine is able to understand Filli. His small size is often advantageous to Lief, Barda and Jasmine, as he is able to hide easily and eavesdrop on others.
- Manus: Manus is a Ralad from the city of Raladin. He cannot speak, due to a curse placed upon the Ralad people by the witch Thaegan when their ancestors spoke out against her evil. His voice, though, was soon well again. As a Ralad, Manus is an exceptional musician and architect, as well as bearing the traditional Ralad blue skin, red hair, and black button eyes. He returns in Return to Del to represent his tribe.
- Steven/Nevets: Steven is a peddler whom Lief, Barda, and Jasmine encounter on their journey. He is cheerful and pleasant, and constantly singing. His mother is Queen Bee herself, and he supplies Queen Bee products to the Resistance. Lief at first worries about Steven travelling alone in such dangerous times, but he is told that Steven is safe without companions, as he is accompanied by his brother, Nevets. The two grew up on the plain in the territory of the opal. Nevets is 'Steven' spelled backwards. He is a great, golden giant living within Steven, and appears whenever Steven, or someone close to him, is threatened, and does not distinguish between friend or foe. Steven often has great trouble controlling his brother, though he lets him free on several occasions. Steven acts as a representative of the Plains tribe in the ceremony to find the heir of Deltora.
- Fardeep: Fardeep is from the Mere tribe and used to own the Champion Inn until the Shadow Lord took it over. The Shadow Lord's minions attacked Rithmere and Fardeep was forced out of his life of luxury. He came to what is now the Valley of the Lost to find peace but the Shadow Lord's influence seeped into his mind, promising him riches and luxury again and Fardeep fell into despair and temptation conquered him and thus he became the Guardian of the diamond. His role in Return to Del was important that he is a pure-blood Meres man and therefore a descendant of the original Deltorans. He represented the Mere tribe.
- Gla-Thon: Gla-Thon belongs to the Dread Gnomes tribe, and as such, is a proud and honorable archer. She meets Lief, Barda and Jasmine when they are captured by the Dread Gnomes, and agrees to assist them in destroying the evil toad that lords over the Gnomes. As such, the Gnomes are freed from their slavery and owe a great debt to Lief. Gla-Thon represents the Dread Gnomes in the ceremony to find the heir of Deltora.
- Zeean: Zeean is a wise, old Toran leader who assists Lief on several occasions in repayment for releasing her tribe from The Valley of the Lost, and holds significant standing in the Toran community. She represents the Torans in the ceremony to find the lost heir of Deltora.
- Glock: Glock is a savage member of the Jalis tribe, and one of the last remaining Jalis people. He was knocked unconscious during the great battle between the Jalis tribe and the servants of the Shadow Lord shortly after the Shadow Lord's invasion. He came across Lief, Barda and Jasmine at the Rithmere Games, where he became one of the semi-finalists. He mocked Jasmine's petite size, but before he could fight her, he was secretly drugged by Doom. Upon regaining consciousness, Glock was captured, along with Neridah, by Grey Guards and were taken to the Shadowlands; before they arrived, however, they were rescued by Doom, and both decided to join the Resistance. Glock caused great trouble at the Resistance, and was eventually moved to Withick Mire, where he took part as a Jalis representative in the ceremony to find the heir of Deltora.
- Dain: Dain was originally a nervous servant to Doom and a member of the Resistance. He was cultured, polite, respectful, and often afraid, yet noble in battle and showing evidence of a great spirit. He saved Lief, Barda, and Jasmine from the Ols, before they knew what an Ol was, and helped them escape from Doom, when Doom held them prisoner for his own reasons. However, Dain was kidnapped by pirates. When the trio later encountered the same pirates, Dain had just freed himself with the help of a polypan, and he came with them to Tora, the magical city. Dain had hoped to meet his parents in Tora, but the city was deserted. He seemed to be all but destroyed by the news, but once they left the city he seemed to feel more hopeful. In the final book, Lief assembles representatives of all seven tribes to pledge loyalty to the heir and thus hope that the Belt will lead them to the heir. It seems clear that Dain is the heir (his name is even made of the same letters as the first king, Adin), but just then he gets kidnapped. Lief picks up his fallen dagger and carries it with him. Knowing that they must get the Belt to the true heir, the team makes plans to get into the city. However, their plans are all anticipated and most of the group is captured. It turns out Dain is not the heir, but a Grade 3 Ol, capable of assuming even inanimate shapes, and sent to spy on the Resistance and eventually on the trio. The fact that he had killed other Ols is not surprising; they were less talented varieties and the Shadow Lord's creations don't have anything resembling a conscience. Ols think only of furthering their own usefulness to the Shadow Lord. The fact that he was an Ol was the reason he was weakened when he entered the magical city of Tora, as its magic weakens evil. In the end, it is the Belt of Deltora itself that destroys Dain.

== See also ==
- Deltora series
- Deltora Quest 1
- Characters in the Deltora series
- Emily Rodda
