= DQ2 =

DQ2 may be:

- Deltora Quest 2, a children's book.
- Dragon Quest II, a role-playing video game.
- HLA-DQ2, a human leukocyte antigen of the HLA DQ type.
