= Dragon's Nest =

2005 Book by Jennifer Rowe (as Emily Rodda)

- First edition
- Author: Emily Rodda
- Cover artist: Marc McBride
- Language: English
- Series: Dragons of Deltora
- Genre: Fantasy novel
- Publisher: Scholastic
- Publication date: 2005
- Publication place: Australia
- Media type: Print (paperback)
- Preceded by: The Shadowlands
- Followed by: Shadowgate

Dragon's Nest is a children's fantasy book written by Emily Rodda. The book is the first book in the Dragons of Deltora series, the third in the Deltora series. It was released in 2005 and is published by Scholastic Press.

== Plot ==
After finally destroying the crystal used by the advisors to communicate with the Shadow Lord, Lief discovers a fragment of a map. It is discovered that the recent outbreak of famine and plague in Deltora is a result of beasts called the Four Sisters, who magically poison the land. Only dragons can kill them, and they are believed to be extinct. However, Doran the Dragonlover convinced seven of them, one from each territory, to go into hibernation. The Sisters live at the easternmost, northernmost, westernmost, and southernmost points of Deltora.

Setting out for Dragon's Nest, the easternmost point in Deltora, the companions discover a Capricon named Rolf captured by the Granous, riddle-loving monsters. Capricons once lived in a great city called Capra, where the town of Broome now stands, but it was destroyed by dragons after the Capricons angered the dragons by stealing their eggs, among other thing. Rolf claims to be the only one left. The companions meet the now-awakened Topaz Dragon, Fidelis, who they previously encountered in hibernation on their way to the underworld in the previous series. He refuses to accompany them, since Doran made the dragons swear not to enter each other's territory while they hibernated, so as to prevent them from taking advantage of each other's slumber. The companions travel on and reach Broome, where they meet the warrior woman Lindal. She guides them to Dragon's Nest, where they find the Sister of the East. Rolf reveals himself to be the Sister's Guardian, having served the Shadow Lord in exchange for magical power and the promise of one day ruling the East, (he is the heir of Capra, and believes it to be his right) and is killed by the newly awakened Ruby Dragon, Joyeu, who destroys the Sister.
