= Shadowgate (novel) =

2004 Book by Jennifer Rowe (as Emily Rodda)

- First edition
- Author: Emily Rodda
- Cover artist: Marc McBride
- Series: Dragons of Deltora
- Genre: Fantasy
- Publisher: Scholastic
- Publication date: 2004
- Publication place: Australia
- Media type: Print (Paperback)
- Preceded by: Dragon's Nest
- Followed by: Isle of the Dead

Shadowgate is a children's fantasy book by Emily Rodda. It is the second book in the Dragons of Deltora series, the third series of the Deltora series. It was first published in 2004 by Scholastic.

== Plot ==
Lief, Barda, and Jasmine travel north to find the Sister of the North. They are captured and adopted by the Masked Ones, a circus troop who all wear masks physically fused into their faces. They were founded by Ballum, a close friend of one of the old kings, who was accused of being a traitor and forced to flee.

During their stay, a mysterious specter keeps appearing and murdering people around the companions. They escape from the Masked Ones and meet the Lapis Lazuli Dragon, Fortuna. They find a castle near a village called Shadowgate, the northernmost point in Deltora. There they discover Bede, son of Bess (leader of the Masked Ones).

They assume him to be the guardian, but it is revealed that it is actually Kirsten, a girl from Shadowgate who fell in love with him, but he loved her sister Mariette, so she grew jealous and turned herself over to the Shadow Lord to be the Guardian of the North if it meant she could keep Bede prisoner. The specter is a projection made by her which she uses to try and kill the companions, but always malfunctions.

The Sister is discovered, and destroyed when the Emerald Dragon, Honora, awakens. Kirsten is killed, Mariette is released from her enchanted imprisonment, and she and Bede live together happily.
