= The Forests of Silence =

2000 Book by Jennifer Rowe (as Emily Rodda)

- Cover of The Forests of Silence, depicting Gorl, the main antagonist of the novel.
- Author: Emily Rodda
- Original title: The Forest of Silence
- Cover artist: Marc McBride
- Language: English
- Series: Deltora Quest
- Genre: Fantasy novel
- Publisher: Scholastic
- Publication date: 2000
- Publication place: Australia
- Media type: Print (Paperback)
- Pages: 131
- ISBN: 0-439-25323-3
- OCLC: 46966042
- LC Class: CPB Box no. 1858 vol. 31
- Followed by: The Lake of Tears

The Forests of Silence is a fantasy novel written by Australian author Emily Rodda, and is the first book in the eight-volume Deltora Quest series, which itself is the first series in a collective series of the same name. It was first published in 2000 by Scholastic and was awarded the "Notable Series in Children's Book of the Year Awards 2001: Younger Readers". The novel follows a teenage boy named Lief as he and his companions search the deadly Forests of Silence for the magical Topaz gem, one of the seven missing gems from the belt of Deltora.

== Synopsis ==
Alton, King of Deltora, and his queen pass away from fever, and their son Prince Endon is crowned King. To consummate this, a magical steel belt, the Belt of Deltora, is set around Endon's waist, which recognizes Endon as Deltora's rightful king and protects the land from the evil Shadow Lord. Endon's friend Jarred, questioning the wisdom of only wearing the Belt during the ruler's coronation, goes to the library and finds a book about the Belt. He learns of its creation by Adin, the first King of Deltora, and his union of the seven tribes of Deltora and their talismans into the Belt of Deltora that drove the Shadow Lord back to the Shadowlands, and that while Adin remained vigilant, knowing the Shadow Lord had not been destroyed, and always wore the Belt of Deltora, successive generations of the royal family have been less so while ceding much of their power to their administrative council, diminishing its power. The result of this has been the lives of the palace families being governed by "The Rule" while they remain separate from their subjects in Del's palace.

Jarred urges Endon to put on the Belt and revive the custom of Adin. However, Endon disagrees, arguing that The Rule enforces that. Before he can explain in detail, Endon's chief advisor, Prandine accuses Jarred of treason, forcing Jarred to flee the palace, leaving only a request to Endon to signal him for aid if he requires it. Escaping the palace in the garbage cart, Jarred learns that Del has fallen into poverty and ruin and the truth is cloaked from the palace by an illusion of mist. Jarred is taken in by Crian, Del's blacksmith, and his granddaughter Anna, Crian fooling the palace guards into believing Jarred perished in the sea. Crian explains to Jarred that the people of Del have long requested aid from the royal family, only to receive dismissive notes promising to attend to their requests when the time comes; Jarred realizes that Prandine and the other chief advisors before him have likely been concealing the truth from the royal family.

Seven years later, Crian has died and Jarred and Anna have married and are expecting their first child. On the anniversary of Jarred's escape from the palace, they see seven giant birds, the Shadow Lord's Ak-Baba, attacking the palace, and Endon signals Jarred for aid and discreetly sends him instructions to find a secret entrance into the palace. Jarred reunites with Endon and learns that their nursemaid Min has died after she tried to warn Endon of evil in the palace, with her own son fleeing the palace. With the aid of Endon's wife, Queen Sharn, Jarred convinces Endon to reclaim the Belt of Deltora, only for them to find that the gems of the Belt Deltora were stolen by the Ak-Baba. Prandine corners them in the tower where the Belt was kept and reveals he serves the Shadow Lord and was responsible for the deaths of Endon's parents, and that the gems were scattered throughout the land, but is tricked by Sharn into looking out the window of the tower and thrown to his death. As the Shadow Lord invades Deltora, Jarred helps Endon and Sharn escape through the secret tunnel, with a plan to ensure their safety.

== Sixteen years later ==
Sixteen years later, the Shadow Lord tyrannically rules Deltora. Jarred and Anna's son Lief is out after curfew on his sixteenth birthday, and narrowly avoids an encounter with two of the Shadow Lord's Grey Guards after someone throws him a rope to escape being cornered in an alley. Lief has grown up hating King Endon for failing Deltora and allowing the Shadow Lord to invade, but is astonished to learn when he returns home that his father grew up with Endon and has been planning to recover the gems of the Belt of Deltora, which he repaired after escaping from the palace. Each gem is hidden in a dangerous location that Lief's father has mapped, and though he once intended to seek the gems himself, his injuries from a treefall in Lief's youth prevent him from travelling, leaving the task to Lief and Barda, Min's son and a former palace guard who has lived with Lief's family since the Shadow Lord invaded. Lief's father gives him the Belt and a sword of his own, and his mother a cloak for his journey, and Lief and Barda leave the palace that night in search of the gems.

They first travel to the local Forests of Silence, as Grey Guards' numbers in the area have recently diminished, but are quickly captured and paralyzed by the local Wenn to be offered to their predatory god, the Wennbar. A wild forest-dwelling girl of Lief's own age, Jasmine, and her animal companions Kree and Filli, appear and steals Lief's cloak, initially abandoning them under the belief they are Grey Guards, but returning to aid them after Lief's explanation that his mother made the cloak convinces her otherwise. Jasmine uses a potion to cure Lief and Barda, and they narrowly evade the Wennbar due to the camouflaging magic of Lief's cloak. Jasmine takes Lief and Barda to her nest, explaining that she has lived in the Forests alone since her parents were taken prisoner by Grey Guards and that she can communicate with plants and animals. Lief and Barda believe the gem is hidden in the Wennbar's cave, but Jasmine explains that it is likely in the Mid Wood of the Forests, in a place called "the Dark".

Jasmine, Kree and Filli lead Lief and Barda to the Dark, where they discover a wall made of steadfastly cultivated vines enclosing a clearing in the very center of the forest. In the center an armored knight, Gorl, guards the Lilies of Life, whose nectar possesses healing properties and grants everlasting life; the pommel of his sword contains the topaz from the Belt of Deltora. Gorl gives Lief and Barda a chance to leave, but takes control of their bodies when they refuse, believing they also seek the Lilies of Life. Barda distracts Gorl by questioning him about his past; Gorl admits that he and his two brothers sought to drink of the Nectar of Life and become immortal but he killed his two brothers' millennia ago because they stood in his way. Barda stabs Gorl in the neck while he is distracted, but Gorl is unaffected and mortally wounds Barda. As Gorl is about to kill Lief, Jasmine persuades a tree to drop a limb onto Gorl, destroying his armor and revealing it to be empty, having been animated by his own will after dying. Jasmine's efforts also breach Gorl's vines, allowing sunlight to enter the Dark and the Lilies of Life bloom at last. Jasmine and Lief use their nectar to heal the dying Barda. As the Lilies fade, Jasmine stores the last of the nectar in a jar.

Lief takes the topaz from Gorl's sword and shows it to Jasmine, who sees the spirit of her deceased mother due to the topaz's power. Jasmine's mother convinces her to aid Lief and Barda in recovering the other six gems of the Belt of Deltora, while the local animals begin to destroy Gorl's wall of vines.

== Characters ==
- Lief: Lief is the main character of the series. Lief was born to parents Jarred and Anna of the Forge. As a child Lief roamed the streets of Del, sharpening his wits and gaining him the skills needed for his future quests. Though he did not know it, he was constantly protected by Barda the beggar whom he hated and he prided himself on his many 'lucky' escapes. On his sixteenth birthday it is revealed to him that he must begin a dangerous quest to find the lost gems of the Belt of Deltora.
- Barda: Barda was enlisted as a friend by the king and queen of Deltora and was trusted to help him find the lost gems of Deltora sixteen years before the initial story took place. For the next sixteen years Barda disguised himself as a beggar so as to discover information vital to the quest. He also became the bodyguard of Jarred and Anna's child Lief, albeit without the semi-arrogant Lief's knowledge thereof. Upon Lief's sixteenth birthday Barda revealed himself to Lief and the quest for the gems of Deltora began. Though Barda was at first annoyed to travel encumbered by a child, he soon saw Lief as more of a help than a hindrance.
- Jasmine: Jasmine is a wild girl, described as having wild black hair and emerald green eyes who has grown up in the Forests of Silence, where Lief and Barda meet her shortly after leaving Del. Her parents were captured by Grey Guards when she was seven years old, and so she has been raised by the forest. She can understand the language of the trees and of many animals, and has incredibly sharp senses, but has trouble understanding some social customs. Jasmine is usually seen with her raven, Kree, and a mouse-like creature she calls Filli. Jasmine is like Lief and occasionally has a quick temper. After helping Lief and Barda in the forest and with the help of the topaz, she is greeted by her mother's spirit from beyond the grave, who tells her to go with Lief and Barda in their quest. After this encounter, she joins Lief and Barda in the search for the great gems that will complete the Belt.

== See also ==
- Deltora series
- Deltora Quest (anime)
