= Tales of Deltora =

Novel by Jennifer Rowe

- Author: Emily Rodda
- Illustrator: Marc McBride
- Language: English
- Series: Deltora Quest (series)
- Subject: Children's fiction
- Genre: Fantasy
- Published: 2006 (Scholastic Books)
- Media type: Print
- Pages: 176
- ISBN: 978-0439877855

Tales of Deltora is a fictional novel written by Emily Rodda and illustrated by Marc McBride. It is a chronicle of ancient stories from the Deltora Quest universe including how the evil Shadow Lord came to be, and how the great Adin obtained the seven gems from each of the tribes to form the Belt of Deltora. It was published by Scholastic in October 2006.
