= Cavern of the Fear =

2002 book by Jennifer Rowe (as Emily Rodda)

Cavern of The Fear
- First edition
- Author: Emily Rodda
- Language: English
- Series: Deltora Quest 2
- Genre: Fantasy novel
- Publisher: Scholastic
- Publication date: 2002
- Publication place: Australia
- Media type: Print (Paperback)
- Preceded by: Return to Del
- Followed by: The Isle of Illusion

Cavern of The Fear is the first book in the Deltora Quest 2 series (Deltora Shadowlands in North America) written by Emily Rodda. It was published by Scholastic in 2002. The story follows the adventures of Lief, Jasmine, and Barda.

== Plot summary ==
In Deltora, a land of magic and monsters, the Shadow Lord's evil tyranny has finally ended after three unlikely heroes Lief, Jasmine and Barda defeated him. He and the creatures of his sorcery have been driven out of Deltora. But thousands of Deltorans are still enslaved in the Shadowlands, the Shadow Lord's terrifying and mysterious domain. To rescue them, Lief, Barda, and Jasmine, heroes of the quest for the Belt of Deltora, must find the Pirran Pipe, the only weapon the Shadow Lord fears. They embark on the dangerous quest and find the first broken piece of the Pipe. There they encounter The Fear, a giant squid or mollusk-like creature with a shell of rock and a tearing beak, whom the three companions battle. In the end, they are not able to defeat it, but then Glock of the Jalis manages to stab a sword down its throat, finally killing it. Glock however dies not long after and is buried among the graves of the past pipers (leaders) of the Plume tribe, on Plume island.

== Characters ==
- Lief: Lief is the main character of the series. As a child Lief roamed the streets of Del, sharpening his wits and gaining him the skills needed for his future quests. On his sixteenth birthday it is revealed to him that he must begin a dangerous quest to find the lost gems of the Belt of Deltora. After he finds the lost gems and restores the Belt of Deltora, the Shadow Lord is defeated. Lief discovers he is the heir to the throne and becomes king of Deltora.
- Barda: Barda was a guard at the king's palace before the Shadow Lord attacked. He was enlisted to help the king find the lost gems of Deltora sixteen years before the initial story took place. Barda then disguised himself as a beggar so as to discover information vital to the quest. Upon Lief's sixteenth birthday Barda revealed himself to Lief and the quest for the gems of Deltora began.
- Jasmine: Jasmine is a wild girl, with wild black hair and emerald green eyes who has grown up in the Forests of Silence, where Lief and Barda meet her shortly after leaving Del. She can understand the language of the trees and of many animals, and has incredibly sharp senses, but has trouble understanding some social customs. Jasmine is usually seen with her raven, Kree, and a mouse-like creature she calls Filli. Like Lief, she occasionally has a quick temper. After helping Lief and Barda in the forest, she joins Lief and Barda in the search for the lost gems.
- The Fear: The Fear is a giant squid-like creature.

== See also ==
- Deltora series
