= City of the Rats =

2001 Book by Jennifer Rowe (as Emily Rodda)

- First edition
- Author: Emily Rodda
- Cover artist: Marc McBride
- Series: Deltora Quest
- Genre: Fantasy novel
- Publisher: Scholastic
- Publication date: 2000
- Publication place: Australia
- Media type: Print (hardback & paperback); Audiobook; E-book
- Pages: 132
- ISBN: 0-439-25325-X
- OCLC: 47014806
- LC Class: CPB Box no. 1857 vol. 34
- Preceded by: The Lake of Tears
- Followed by: The Shifting Sands

City of the Rats is the third novel in the eight-volume fantasy series Deltora Quest, written by Australian author Emily Rodda. The novel was first published by Scholastic in 2000, and later released in the United States in 2001. The novel continues Lief, Barda, and Jasmine's journey to find the seven missing gems of Deltora, braving dangers and guardians in each book.

== Plot summary ==
Lief, Barda, and Jasmine leave the Lake of Tears after retrieving the Ruby, searching for the next gem at the City of the Rats. While traveling, they find signs for a shop run by a "Tom", something Jasmine is unfamiliar with, but are trapped by Sorceress Thaegan's remaining eleven children, seeking revenge over the deaths of Thaegan, Jin and Jod. Noting the children's argument over how to divide them to eat, Lief and Barda provoke the children into infighting over deciding fairly, resulting in all of them being killed bar the strongest, Ichabod, while Lief, Barda and Jasmine escape thanks to Filli.

After wounding Ichabod and escaping Thaegan's territory, the group find and enter Tom's shop and buy useful provisions while encountering a scarred stranger who draws the Ralad sign of freedom in the dust on Tom's counter, resulting in Tom selling him goods at a discount. They also attempt to purchase horses from Tom, but Tom refuses due to the horses being booked for other clients, instead selling them tri-legged Muddlets. Tom warns them to avoid taking a certain path, but Lief ignores his advice, believing Tom, not knowing their destination, was trying to warn them away from the City of the Rats. The Muddlets subsequently bolt, knocking Lief, Barda and Jasmine out, and they are found by the people of Noradz.

Noradz is ruled by the Ra-Kacharz, who enforce a state of extreme cleanliness and serve a luxurious meal for the populace and their guests. Lief befriends one of the serving girls, Tira, after taking the blame for her spilling food accidentally, a crime punishable by whipping in Noradz, which Lief is spared due to being a guest. However, when Filli comes out of hiding from Jasmine's shirt, the people of Noradz believe she brought it to destroy him and try to kill him, imprisoning the trio after Filli escapes. Reece, leader of the Ra-Kacharz, commands Lief to pick a card labeled either "Life" or "Death" out of a cup to decide their fate, but Tira alerts Lief that both cards are labeled "Death", allowing Lief pretend to accidentally burn one of them and have the other Ra-Kacharz, unaware of Reece's treachery, believe he had drawn the "Life" card when they find the "Death" card remaining. Although spared, the trio are imprisoned without food, and Tira visits them and reveals Reece had claimed they would be looked after. They convince Tira to release them and show them how to escape, and Tira leads them to the kitchens, where "The Hole" is said to be the only other escape from Noradz. Four of the Ra-Kacharz, including Reece, attack the group and easily defeat them, but three are beaten when distracted by Filli and Tira knocks Reece out with a frying pan and flees back into Noradz. Disguising themselves in the Ra-Kacharz' hard red uniforms, they escape into The Hole with Reece, who is killed when he is exposed to poisonous fungus in the tunnel; the Ra-Kacharz' uniforms protect them normally. They hide in a cart carrying food tossed into the Hole, only to return to Tom's shop and learn he supplies the Grey Guards who take the food to Del to feed the Shadow Lord's servants. Tom conceals the trio and claims to be neutral, admitting he had sold them Noradz' Muddlets out of greed.

Lief, Barda and Jasmine finally reach the Broad River and cross it with Water Eaters they purchased from Tom, but their camp is attacked by a horde of ravenous rats that have eaten everything living on the plain. Lief, Barda, and Jasmine barely fend off the rats using explosive Fire Beads and change into the Ra-Kacharz uniforms, untouched by the rats, to enter the City of the Rats without being eaten. There, Lief starts to hear a voice, revealed to be Reeah, a huge snake whose crown houses the opal. Appealing to Reeah's ego and learning of its meager origins, Lief realizes that the past inhabitants of the City of the Rats were the people of Noradz, and that "Noradz" was a homophone of "No Rats" and "Ra-Kacharz" was a homophone of "Rat-Catchers", who had conspiring with the Shadow Lord to drive the people from the City and install Reeah there. Reeah attacks them, mortally wounding Lief and starting a fire, and is killed by Jasmine, who heals Lief with nectar from the Lilies of Life. They escape from the burning city and Lief explains his deductions to Barda and Jasmine, realizing Filli's furry appearance reminded the people of Noradz of the rats. Lief takes the opal from Reeah's crown, which gives him a vision of him sinking into the Shifting Sands, the location of the next gem.

== Characters ==
- Lief: Lief is the main character of the series. Lief was born to parents King Endon and Queen Sharn though he believed them to be Jarred and Anna of the forge. As a child Lief roamed the streets of Del, sharpening his wits and gaining him the skills needed for his future quests. Though he did not know it, he was constantly protected by Barda and he prided himself on his many 'lucky' escapes. On his sixteenth birthday, it is revealed to him that he must begin a dangerous quest to find the lost gems of the Belt of Deltora.
- Barda: Barda was enlisted as a friend by the king and queen of Deltora and was trusted to help him find the lost gems of Deltora sixteen years before the initial story took place. For the next sixteen years, Barda disguised himself as a beggar so as to discover information vital to the quest. He also became the bodyguard of Endon and Sharn's child Lief, albeit without the semi-arrogant Lief's knowledge thereof. Upon Lief's sixteenth birthday Barda revealed himself to Lief and the quest for the gems of Deltora began. Though Barda was at first annoyed to travel encumbered by a child, he soon saw Lief as more of a help than a hindrance.
- Jasmine: Jasmine is a wild girl, described as having wild black hair (dark green hair in the anime) and emerald green eyes who has grown up in the Forests of Silence, where Lief and Barda meet her shortly after leaving Del. Her parents, Jarred and Anna, were captured by Grey Guards when she was seven years old, and so she has been raised by the forest. She can understand the language of the trees and of many animals, and has incredibly sharp senses, but has trouble understanding some social customs. Jasmine is usually seen with her raven, Kree, and a mouse-like creature she calls Filli. Jasmine is like Lief and occasionally has a quick temper. After helping Lief and Barda in the forest and with the help of the topaz, she is greeted by her mother's spirit from beyond the grave, who tells her to go with Lief and Barda in their quest. After this encounter, she joins Lief and Barda in the search for the great gems that will complete the Belt.

== See also ==
- Deltora series
- Deltora Quest 1
- Emily Rodda
- Characters in the Deltora series
