= The Isle of Illusion =

2002 Book by Jennifer Rowe (as Emily Rodda)

- Author: Emily Rodda
- Language: English
- Series: Deltora Shadowlands
- Genre: Fantasy novel
- Publisher: Scholastic
- Publication date: 2002
- Publication place: Australia
- Media type: Print (Paperback)
- ISBN: 0-439-39492-9
- Preceded by: Cavern of the Fear
- Followed by: The Shadowlands

The Isle of Illusion is a children's fantasy book by Emily Rodda. It was published in 2002 by Scholastic. It is the second book in the Deltora Quest 2 series, the second series in the collective Deltora Quest series. It is preceded by Cavern of the Fear and followed by The Shadowlands.

== Summary ==
The Isle of Illusion continues where Cavern of the Fear left off. Lief, Barda and Jasmine resume their quest to reunite the three pieces of the fabled Pirran Pipe. They must collect the middle piece of the pipe from the Auron tribe.

== See also ==
- Deltora Quest series
