= The Valley of the Lost =

2002 Book by Jennifer Rowe (as Emily Rodda)

- Author: Emily Rodda
- Cover artist: Marc McBride
- Language: English
- Series: Deltora Quest
- Genre: Fantasy novel
- Publisher: Scholastic
- Publication date: 2002
- Publication place: Australia
- Media type: Print (Paperback)
- Pages: 144
- ISBN: 0-439-25329-2
- OCLC: 48009999
- LC Class: CPB Box no. 1918 vol. 1
- Preceded by: The Maze of the Beast
- Followed by: Return to Del

The Valley of the Lost is the seventh book in the Deltora Quest novel series written by Emily Rodda. The final gem from the Belt of Deltora, the diamond, is in the mysterious Valley of the Lost, held by the mysterious Guardian. To retrieve the gem, Lief, Barda, and Jasmine must play his game. If they win, they will get the gem. If they lose they will stay trapped inside the Valley of the Lost forever.

== Plot summary ==
Following the events of The Maze of the Beast, Lief, Barda and Jasmine continue their journey to the Valley of the Lost to retrieve the seventh and final gem of the Belt of Deltora, the diamond. The three travel along the river Tor, passing villages that have been raided by pirates as they attempt to cross, narrowly avoiding a bridge guarded by the Shadow Lord's shapeshifting Ols. When they stop to rest, they see the pirate ship that had captured them and Dain in The Maze of the Beast and find a boat to row to it as the pirates argue over whether to give Dain to the Grey Guards, lest they risk the wrath of Doom, leader of the Resistance. A fire and a fight break out on the ship, started by the pirates' captured polypan, who escapes with Dain into Lief, Barda and Jasmine's boat. The polypan successfully rows against the flooding currents of the river away from the pirate ship and toward shore, but flees ashore as soon as it is able, stranding the party in the boat as the current washes them away.

The following morning, they awake outside the magic city of Tora, where Dain's parents and the exiled royal family are believed to have sought refuge, only to find the city deserted, as the Torans had refused to help Endon after years of refusal from the royal family and broke their vow to aid him, banishing them from the city. The revelations seemingly crush Dain's spirit, and they take him from the city at his request, encountering Doom and the acrobat Neridah outside Tora. After Dain confronts Doom over lying to him about knowing Tora was empty, Doom and Neridah are sent into Tora to pass through its evil-purifying magic to prove they are not Ols. Lief takes the opportunity to question Doom over his past. Dain returns to the Resistance with Doom, who warns the trio against journeying to the Valley of the Lost and of the Guardian who keeps the diamond, but Neridah parts with him, desiring to return home with Lief, Barda and Jasmine.

Despite her claims, Neridah refuses to leave the group when chances arise to return home, so they sneak away during the night to enter the Valley of the Lost. As soon as they enter, they encounter hundreds of ghostly people and the Guardian, who binds them to his will, including Neridah, who had followed them into the Valley in search of the diamond. The Guardian reveals his four pets, Greed, Envy, Pride, and Hate, and treats the group to a feast before revealing they can play a game to find his true name to acquire the diamond, though they will be trapped in the Valley if they lose. Neridah refuses to play and is allowed to leave, while Lief, Barda and Jasmine accept the Guardian's challenge, as the diamond's powers will curse them if they steal it.

A riddle in a mirror provides the clues to the Guardian's name, including the fault of one of the Guardian's pets, which the trio work out from the clues the Guardian had discreetly given them in conversation, a glass ornament in the palace that Barda solves by recalling his palace guard days, and the sum of differences between two pictures of hermits in a rug. They successfully deduce the Guardian's name to be Endon, the king of Deltora, and learn that Doom had previously visited the Valley and won the game, but did not take the diamond because of his shock at the Guardian's true identity. Although the Guardian gives them a diamond, Lief realizes it is not the real diamond and confronts the Guardian, who reveals that Neridah stole the real diamond and refuses to disclose her whereabouts. He realizes that they are the ones the Shadow Lord has warned him about and tries to take the Belt of Deltora from Lief, but is repelled by its magic and attacked by his pets, revealed to be vile growths created from his own body. After Lief severs the pets from the Guardian to save him, he reveals that Neridah is in the stream, having tripped, fallen and drowned due to the diamond's curse. Lief completes the Belt and the Valley of the Lost disappears and all of the ghostly people in are freed, who reveal themselves to be the people of Tora and the Guardian's prior victims, while the Guardian is revealed to be Fardeep, the previous owner of Rithmere's Champion Inn who the Shadow Lord had instructed to pose as Endon in hopes of breaking the spirits of potential resistors. With all seven gems restored to the Belt, the group next set their sights on finding the heir to the throne of Deltora.

== Characters ==
- Lief: Lief is the main character of the series. Lief was born to parents King Endon and Queen Sharn though he believed them to be Jarred and Anna of the forge. As a child Lief roamed the streets of Del, sharpening his wits and gaining him the skills needed for his future quests. Though he did not know it, he was constantly protected by Barda and he prided himself on his many 'lucky' escapes. On his sixteenth birthday it is revealed to him that he must begin a dangerous quest to find the lost gems of the Belt of Deltora.
- Barda: Barda was enlisted as a friend by the king and queen of Deltora and was trusted to help him find the lost gems of Deltora sixteen years before the initial story took place. For the next sixteen years Barda disguised himself as a beggar so as to discover information vital to the quest. He also became the bodyguard of Endon and Sharn's child Lief, albeit without the semi-arrogant Lief's knowledge thereof. Upon Lief's sixteenth birthday Barda revealed himself to Lief and the quest for the gems of Deltora began. Though Barda was at first annoyed to travel encumbered by a child, he soon saw Lief as more of a help than a hindrance.
- Jasmine: Jasmine is a wild girl, described as having wild black hair (dark green hair in the anime) and emerald green eyes who has grown up in the Forests of Silence, where Lief and Barda meet her shortly after leaving Del. Her parents, Jarred and Anna, were captured by Grey Guards when she was seven years old, and so she has been raised by the forest. She can understand the language of the trees and of many animals, and has incredibly sharp senses, but has trouble understanding some social customs. Jasmine is usually seen with her raven, Kree, and a mouse-like creature she calls Filli. Jasmine is like Lief and occasionally has a quick temper. After helping Lief and Barda in the forest and with the help of the topaz, she is greeted by her mother's spirit from beyond the grave, who tells her to go with Lief and Barda in their quest. After this encounter, she joins Lief and Barda in the search for the great gems that will complete the Belt.
- Kree: Kree is a raven and one of Jasmine's closest companions in the Forest of Silence. His family was taken and eaten by the witch Thaegan, and Kree was found by Jasmine. She took pity on him, as both had their family taken away, and she took care of Kree. Kree treats Jasmine as his master, and does not tolerate offensive behavior towards Jasmine. His presence is advantageous towards the three companions, as he is able to fly ahead and warn the others of oncoming danger or safety. And on the second episode, he kills Thaegan by stabbing her on the finger.
- Filli: Filli is a small, mouse-like creature (although Jasmine denies that he resembles any rodent). He was rescued by Jasmine when she discovered him paralyzed by the Wenn in The Forests of Silence. As such, he remains close to Jasmine and Kree, often hiding himself in Jasmine's clothing when danger arises. Like Kree, Jasmine is able to understand Filli. His small size is often advantageous to Lief, Barda and Jasmine, as he is able to hide easily and eavesdrop on others.
- Fardeep: The Guardian of the diamond. He has four terrible creatures as pets, Hate, Envy, Greed and Pride, who are in fact living growths, attached to him. He makes up a game and calls himself Endon, king of Deltora. If they win, and do guess his name, he will give them the diamond.

== See also ==
- Deltora series
- Deltora Quest 1
- Characters in the Deltora series
- Emily Rodda
