= Isle of the Dead (Rodda novel) =

2004 novel by Jennifer Rowe (as Emily Rodda)

Isle of The Dead
- First edition
- Author: Emily Rodda
- Cover artist: Marc McBride
- Language: English
- Series: Dragons of Deltora
- Genre: Fantasy novel
- Publisher: Scholastic
- Publication date: 2004
- Publication place: Australia
- Media type: Print (Paperback)
- Preceded by: Shadowgate
- Followed by: The Sister of the South

Isle of the Dead is a 2004 children's fantasy book by the English-speaking Australian writer Emily Rodda.

It is the third book in the third series of the Deltora series called Dragons of Deltora, also known as Deltora Quest 3 and, in Australia, Deltora III.

It was originally published by Scholastic.

== Plot ==
Lief, Barda, and Jasmine have destroyed the Sister of the North and must travel to the Isle of the Dead, the westernmost point of Deltora, to defeat the Sister of the West.

== Characters ==
- Lief
- Barda
- Jasmine
