= Tom Edwards (actor) =

Canadian actor, playwright and humorist

Tom Edwards is a Canadian actor, playwright and humorist. He has performed in numerous plays and stage acts, he is also a voice actor who works for Blue Water Studios. Edwards is probably best known for providing the voice of Char Aznable and Kyral Mekirel respectively in the English dub of Mobile Suit Zeta Gundam and Mobile Fighter G Gundam.

Edwards began studying acting at Bishop Grandin High School in Calgary, Alberta, Canada, around 1976 and went on to earn an undergraduate degree in drama at the University of Calgary.

Edwards is owner of Demos 4 Dummies, a business that provides voice actors with comedy scripts to apply to their demos.

== Filmography ==
=== Anime roles ===
- Deltora Quest - Barda
- Mobile Fighter G Gundam - Kyral Mekirel / The Birdman
- Mobile Suit Zeta Gundam - Quattro Bajeena / Char Aznable
- Pretty Cure - Dark King / Zakenna
- Viper's Creed - Additional voices
- Zoids: Chaotic Century - Phantom

=== Non-anime roles ===
- Anash and the Legacy of the Sun-Rock - Zebe, Russian Soldiers, Daxa
- Freezer Burn: The Invasion of Laxdale - Alien Captain
- Jet Boy - Nathan's Last Pick-up
- Terminal City Ricochet - Skivver

=== Video game roles ===
- Baldur's Gate II: Throne of Bhaal - various goblins, East Asian father, Dragon
- Dragon Age II - additional voices (Legacy)
- Mobile Suit Gundam: Gundam vs. Zeta Gundam - Quattro Bajeena
- Mass Effect 3 - additional voices
