= Secrets of Deltora =

2009 book by Emily Rodda

- Author: Emily Rodda
- Illustrator: Marc McBride
- Language: English
- Series: Deltora Quest
- Published: 2009 (Scholastic Books)
- Pages: 176
- ISBN: 978-0545069335

Secrets of Deltora is a fictional book in the Deltora Quest series written by Emily Rodda and illustrated by Marc McBride. This book is a fictional travel guide around Deltora, written from the point of view of Doran the Dragonlover.
