= The Sister of the South =

2004 Book by Jennifer Rowe (as Emily Rodda)

- Front cover
- Author: Emily Rodda
- Cover artist: Marc McBride
- Language: English
- Series: Dragons of Deltora
- Genre: Fantasy novel
- Publisher: Scholastic
- Publication date: 2004
- Publication place: Australia
- Media type: Print (Paperback)
- Preceded by: Isle of the Dead
- Followed by: The Golden Door

The Sister of the South is a children's fantasy book written by Emily Rodda. The book is the fourth and final book in the Dragons of Deltora series, the third in the Deltora series. It was released in 2004 and is published by Scholastic Press.

== Plot ==
After destroying the Sister of the West, Lief, Barda, and Jasmine return to Del, the southernmost point in Deltora, to find the Sister of the South. They find that someone is poisoning people at the palace, and a bizarre beast attacks them several times. After Josef dies from poison, they discover that an addition to the Palace Chapel was forcibly added by the Chief Advisors, and that this is where the Sister is. Nevets kills the mysterious beast just as the Topaz Dragon arrives to destroy the Sister. It is discovered that Paff, Josef's new assistant, was the Guardian and was poisoning the people and projecting the beast similarly to Kirsten's specter. She kills herself out of grief.

Just as it seems the quest is finished, it turns out that Josef had deduced a terrible secret: the Shadow Lord had a contingency plan. The Sisters' magic, poisoning the land, was also imprisoning a far worse threat: a creature called the Grey Death, a flood of grey liquid that kills everything it touches. Imprisoned at Hira (a.k.a. the City of the Rats), in the center of the land, now it is rising to destroy the land. However, the Shadow Lord did not count on the dragons working together. With the Opal Dragon, Hopian, now awakened, the seven dragons kill four of the seven Ak-Baba and destroy the Grey Death with their fire.

The epilogue claims that this victory will be celebrated by a festival called Dragon Night, and that the heroes will marry, have children, and live the rest of their lives peacefully and happily. It is also hinted that the dragons will repopulate.
