= Deltora Quest 1 =

2000-2002 series of eight books by Jennifer Rowe (as Emily Rodda)

- The Forests of Silence (2000); The Lake of Tears (2000); City of the Rats (2000); The Shifting Sands (2000); Dread Mountain (2000); The Maze of the Beast (2001); The Valley of the Lost (2001); Return to Del (2001)
- Author: Emily Rodda
- Cover artist: Mark McBride
- Country: Australia
- Language: English
- Genre: Fantasy
- Publisher: Scholastic
- Published: 1 May 2000 – 1 November 2001
- Media type: Print (Paperback)
- No. of books: 8
- Followed by: Deltora Quest 2

Deltora Quest (often called Deltora Quest 1 by fans) is a children's fantasy novel series written by Emily Rodda. It was first published between 2000 and 2002 in Australia by Scholastic Press. There are eight books in this series: The Forests of Silence, The Lake of Tears, City of the Rats, The Shifting Sands, Dread Mountain, The Maze of the Beast, The Valley of the Lost and Return to Del in that order. These books are followed by two other series set in the same universe: Deltora Quest 2 (Deltora Shadowlands in North America), Deltora Quest 3 (Dragons of Deltora in North America). Together, these three series are collectively also referred to as the Deltora Quest series, and occasionally the Deltora series by some fans.

== Plot ==
The series depicts the adventures of Lief, the teenage son of a blacksmith, and the Good vs. Evil struggle of his country against its dictator. He initially lives with his parents in the city of Del, situated on the fictional island of Deltora. The main story arc takes place during a time of economic depression and political repression, under the dictatorship of the evil Shadow Lord. This is the second time that the country's welfare has been threatened by him: the Shadow Lord's previous attempt at power was foiled by the creation of a magical jeweled Belt that was able to repel his dark magic and drive him into hiding. Over time, however, he was able to infiltrate the royal cabinet and manipulate the royal family into wearing the Belt less and less. Eventually, the Shadow Lord also managed to corrupt the trade system, sever communication between major cities, and render civilians politically powerless. Having established chaos, he set his seven Ak-Baba to scatter the Belt's gemstones throughout Deltora, in "fearful places, guarded by seven terrifying guardians". The people's protection gone, the Shadow Lord assumed leadership. Lief, born soon after the beginning of this dark reign, is told of the gems on his sixteenth birthday. His father, Jarred, has reforged the damaged Belt so that the gems may be reunited. Wanting the Shadow Lord overthrown, Lief leaves home to search for the seven gems: the topaz, the ruby, the opal, the lapis lazuli, the emerald, the amethyst and the diamond, which represent each of the ancient tribes of Deltora. He is accompanied by Barda "The Beggar", a family friend who trained as a palace guard for the royal family until his mother's murder, and they are later joined by the wild forest girl Jasmine. Together the trio travel across Deltora in search of the lost gems. The locations of the gems comprise the titles of the books-with the exception of volume 8-and each gem has certain magical properties, which often assist with the quest.

=== The Forests of Silence ===
The Forests of Silence is the first book of the Deltora Quest series and acts as a sort of introduction to the series. The book is split in two parts, the first, acting like a long prologue, following the lives of Jarred and King Endon, of their childhood and adult life up to when the Shadow Lord conquers the land of Deltora and the gems are separated from the Belt. Jarred and Endon were the best of friends until the chief adviser, Prandine (the Shadow Lord's spy), framed Jarred for trying to kill Endon, forcing Jarred to flee the castle. Before he leaves, Jarred hides in the tree he and Endon played in as kids and leaves Endon a coded message telling Endon to signal if he ever needs Jarred's help. Once he escapes, Jarred learns that everything they thought they knew about the world outside the palace was a lie. The palace was surrounded by a magical mist caused by the Shadow Lord, that makes the village of Del appear a happy and prosperous place to anyone looking out at it from the castle (as the royal family never leaves the castle, the mist is very unlikely to be discovered). In actuality, the people in Del were starving and in great decline. Jarred begins his new life as a blacksmith's apprentice, later becoming a blacksmith himself. Jarred watched the palace every night for the next few years, until Endon signaled him and by then it was too late to save the gems and prevent the Shadow Lord's invasion. In the second half of the book, Lief, Barda, and Jasmine recover the first of the famed jewels, the topaz, from the Forests of Silence.
