= Deltora Quest (book series) =

Children's fantasy series by Emily Rodda

- Deltora Quest: The Forests of Silence (2000); The Lake of Tears (2000); City of the Rats (2000); The Shifting Sands (2000); Dread Mountain (2000); The Maze of the Beast (2001); The Valley of the Lost (2001); Return to Del (2001); Deltora Quest 2 / Deltora Shadowlands: Cavern of the Fear (2002); The Isle of Illusion (2002); The Shadowlands (2002); Deltora Quest 3 / Dragons of Deltora: Dragon's Nest (2003); Shadowgate (2004); Isle of the Dead (2004); The Sister of the South (2004)
- Author: Emily Rodda
- Country: Australia
- Genre: Fantasy
- Publisher: Scholastic
- Published: 1 May 2000 – 1 October 2004
- Media type: Print (paperback)

Deltora Quest is the collective title for three distinct series of children's fantasy books, written by Australian author Emily Rodda. It follows the adventures of three companions as they journey across the fictional land of Deltora, endeavouring to recover the seven gems stolen from the magical Belt of Deltora and defeat allies of the evil Shadow Lord. The series was first published in Australia in 2000 and has since been published in more than 30 countries. The series has sold over 18 million copies worldwide, including over 2 million in Australia. It is published by Scholastic in Australia and the United States. In most countries, the series is illustrated by Marc McBride.

The series consists of fifteen books: the first eight comprise the Deltora Quest series, the next three comprise the Deltora Shadowlands series (also known as Deltora Quest 2, Deltora II or Deltora 2) and the final four comprise the Dragons of Deltora series (also known as Deltora Quest 3, Deltora III or Deltora 3). There are also six other official bonus books to the series: The Deltora Book of Monsters, Tales of Deltora, The Authorised Ultimate Deltora Quiz Book, How to Draw Deltora Monsters, How to Draw Deltora Dragons and Other Creatures, and Secrets of Deltora. An anime adaptation of the series aired on Japanese television from 6 January 2007 to 29 March 2008. An anime adaptation also aired in Australia for a short time. A Nintendo DS game for Deltora Quest has also been made in Japan. In an interview, as part of the 2011 Australian Council of the Arts Get Reading! Program, Emily Rodda announced that she had sold the movie rights of the Deltora Quest series to a "prominent Hollywood production company."

In May 2015, a new series of books by Emily Rodda set in the world of Deltora was announced by Scholastic, Star of Deltora, and the first installment, Shadows of the Master, was released in August 2015.

== Plot ==
=== Deltora Quest ===
The first series of Deltora Quest follows the journeys of Lief, the son of a humble blacksmith [in disguise], who, on his sixteenth birthday, sets out to fulfill his father's quest to restore the Belt of Deltora. Joining Lief is an ex-palace guard named Barda. Along the way they meet Jasmine: a wild girl from the Forests of Silence, who has long, brown hair and green eyes. She can speak to trees and has two pets: a raven named Kree and a small, grey, furry creature called Filli. Their quest is to find the seven gems of the fabled Belt of Deltora: the topaz, the ruby, the opal, the lapis lazuli, the emerald, the amethyst, and the diamond. The gems each have a special power and are hidden in dangerous locations around Deltora. The three friends must face numerous perils to reach them. Once the Belt is complete and the proper descendant of the first King of Deltora, Adin, wears the belt, the evil tyranny of the Shadow Lord will be forced back to the Shadowlands. The books in this series are The Forests of Silence, The Lake of Tears, City of the Rats, The Shifting Sands, Dread Mountain, The Maze of the Beast, The Valley of the Lost, and Return to Del.

=== Deltora Quest 2 ===
In Deltora Quest 2, Lief, Barda, and Jasmine go on a quest below the land of Deltora, and travel through strange societies underground. They were formed by the three tribes of the former inhabitants of the Shadowlands, which was long ago a beautiful land called Pirra, which the Shadow Lord repressed by preventing the magic of the Pirran Pipe from protecting the land. The three adventurers convince each tribe to lend them their pieces of the Pipe, before Lief, Barda and Jasmine travel into the Shadowlands itself to use the Pipe to hold off the Shadow Lord and his evil power long enough for the thousands of Deltoran slaves to escape. The books are Cavern of the Fear, The Isle of Illusion, and The Shadowlands.

=== Deltora Quest 3 ===
In Deltora Quest 3 the three companions once again must save Deltora, this time from the Four Sisters, evil creations of the Shadow Lord. These four Sisters sing their songs of death across Deltora, poisoning the land and gradually causing Deltora's crops to wither, resulting in famine across the land. With only a part of a torn map left by Doran the Dragonlover, they set out to find these Sisters and destroy them. Each Sister must be destroyed with the aid of a dragon. When each Sister and the Sister's guardian are destroyed, another fragment of the map is found. Eventually they discover that the Sisters are hidden in the four most eastern, northern, western and southern corners of Deltora. The Sister of the East is hidden in Dragon's Nest. The Sister of the North is hidden at Shadowgate and the Sister of the West is on the Isle of the Dead. The Sister of the South is hidden in the city of Del, which happens to be the hometown of Lief. However, after Lief, Barda and Jasmine defeat the last Sister, Lief realises that in the exact middle of Deltora, a huge bubble made of poisonous grey liquid is rising from the land. Together with Barda and Jasmine and all the dragons, he must defeat it. The books are named after the Sisters' locations: Dragon's Nest, Shadowgate, Isle of the Dead, and The Sister of the South.

=== Supplementary works ===
In addition to the books which tell the story, the Deltora series includes a number of companion books (also authored by Emily Rodda):

Tales of Deltora: This book tells of how the land of Deltora came to be, including the origin of the seven gems and the Shadow Lord. It includes tales that make up some of the legends, evolution of secrets, and 20 new illustrations by Marc McBride. The book is "written" by Josef, who in the Deltora Quest 2 and Deltora Quest 3 series is the palace librarian of the city Del. The book was published by Scholastic Press in 2006. A new version was published in 2013 which included three extra stories of the isle of Dorne, bridging the gap between the Three Doors trilogy and the Deltora Quest series by expanding on the history of Dorne as well as the Shadow Lord.

Secrets of Deltora: This book was "written" by Doran the Dragonlover as a travel guide for Deltora.

The Deltora Book of Monsters: This book goes through all the monsters and other deadly things that exist in the world of Deltora, from the original Deltora Quest to Dragons of Deltora. The book includes the beasts throughout history and significant landmarks, such as Reeah from the City of the Rats. The book is also "written" by Josef, the palace librarian in King Lief and King Alton's time.

The Land of Dragons: Although it does not have the word "Deltora" in the title, this book is related to the Deltora Quest series. It contains tales of the isle of Dorne, bridging the gap between the Three Doors trilogy and Deltora Quest. The book was offered for free as part of the Australian Council of the Arts Get Reading! Program. The tales of Dorne were later included in a 2013 paperback re-release of Tales of Deltora.

Other books include How to Draw Deltora Monsters and The Ultimate Deltora Quiz Book. The former book, which details the drawing of Deltoran monsters, was primarily authored by illustrator Marc McBride.

At the Melbourne Writer's Festival, Rodda announced that the lands in Rowan of Rin are set in the same world as Deltora, to its east. In the back of the paperback version of the Star of Deltora books (starting with Shadows of the Master) there is also an author's note that states that Rowan of Rin, The Three Doors, and Deltora Quest are set in the same world.

== Main characters ==
=== Lief ===
Barda describes Lief as "a young hot-head" who spends his time roaming the streets and both tempting and dodging trouble. On his 16th birthday he leaves Del on a magical and dangerous quest to find the magical gems missing from the Belt of Deltora and the heir destined to wear it. Lief is tempted in many ways and by the end of the first series he has grown not only in bravery and strength, but also in wisdom and patience. Lief is very courageous and extremely trustworthy. A few times he considers giving up the quest, but the thought of his friends or allies suffering always helps him to continue. The second series sees the characters questioning their trust of one another as they plot to save the slaves in the Shadowlands. In the third series, Lief and friends once more quest around Deltora, awakening the ancient dragons which help him destroy the Sisters of the North, South, East, and West. In the eighth book, it is told that Lief's hair is dark. It is implied in Isle of the Dead that he is at least eighteen. During the second series, Lief and Jasmine's romantic feelings for each other become more pronounced, and at the end of the third series they get married and have three children, a daughter named Anna (after Jasmine's mother) and twin sons called Jarred (after Jasmine's father) and Endon (after Lief's father).

=== Barda ===
At the beginning of the series Barda appears to be a poor beggar living on the streets of Del. He escaped the palace the day the Shadow Lord attacked and his mother, the nursemaid Min, died, becoming a beggar because he knew he would be the next target the enemy would try to kill. He is revealed to be an ex-palace guard who assumes the role of protector to Lief, much to both his and Lief's dismay. He is a skilled swordsman and often makes grim jokes about being stuck with two young hot-heads (Lief and Jasmine). During the series, Barda competes in a contest in which he describes his special skill as strength. He helps Lief and Jasmine along the quest and is always stronghearted, never gives up hope and is rather a gentle giant. At the end of the third series Barda finds love and happiness with Lindal of Broome, whom he marries and together they have six children.

=== Jasmine ===
Jasmine is 16, approximately the same age as Lief. She is described as having black/brown hair which frames her brown, elfish face and emerald green eyes. When she was first introduced she wore the tattered remains of the uniforms of Grey Guards. She is often described as impatient and lonely, but with a good heart. In the beginning of the series, Jasmine is a wild orphan girl who lives a solitary life in the dangerous Forests of Silence with her pets: Kree, a raven, and Filli, a small, grey, furry creature. She meets Lief and Barda when the pair get trapped in the forests by the Wenn. Jasmine understands the language of trees and many other animals. She is independent, like Lief, though she displays far less tact. She is also unafraid of standing up for what she believes in; if she feels something is unjust or incorrect she explains her view without any fear of the consequences. She believes in equal rights and fairness. However, she cannot understand people who will not fight for themselves. As a result of her forest upbringing Jasmine knows how to defend herself, is more agile than most people and can balance on things very easily. She is also used to getting her own way, which sometimes causes conflict with her companions. In the beginning of the series she had no understanding of money. In The Forests of Silence, when Jasmine touches the topaz (which has power to contact to the spirit world), she sees her mother there, who tells Jasmine to join the quest with Lief and Barda to save Deltora. She shows romantic interest in Lief, even though they do not always see eye to eye. She has a very short temper, resulting in many people describing her as "wild".

== Concepts ==
A recurring political idea expressed in the series is that a leader who does not understand ordinary people is doomed to failure. Another political concept focuses on the disastrous results of leaders who ignore history. The first and second series explore the idea of "united we stand, divided we fall". Stories also occasionally explore the concept of gambling, and its relationship with trickery. A heavy emphasis on the importance of the natural world is also present, particularly in the third series. The final books explore the nature of despair.

== Awards ==
Accolades awarded to Deltora Quest:

- YABBA - Older Readers Award (2001)
- WAYRBA - Younger Readers Award (2002)
- KOALA - Younger Readers Award (2002)
- Aurealis Awards: Peter McNamara Convenors' Award – Deltora Quest series (2002)
- YABBA - Younger Readers Award (2003)
- COOL Awards - Fiction for Younger Readers awards (2003)
- COOL Awards Fiction for Younger Readers Award for the Deltora Quest 3 series (2004)
- KOALA - Younger Readers Award (2004)

== Adaptations ==
=== Anime ===
Rodda has said there has been some interest in adapting the Deltora series into a film but she refused to let any adaptation change the story. There was also a Nintendo DS real-time RPG confirmed with all three characters, released in 2007 exclusively in Japanese under the name Deltora Quest: The Seven Gems. A 65-episode Deltora Quest anime series of the first eight books began its broadcast season in Japan on 6 January 2007. Rodda said she chose this option because she and her children "love Japanese anime and want any adaptation of Deltora to be cool". The series was produced at Oriental Light and Magic and directed by Mitsuru Hongo. At least one noticeable alteration has been made in the studio's adaptation: Lief's hair colour has been changed from black to blond. Rodda has not ruled out a live action version of the story (either film or television) being made at some point in the future, but she intends to wait until she gets an offer that "is genuinely admiring of the books as they are". There is also a manga adaptation by Makoto Niwano, serialised in Bom Bom Comics and published by Kodansha.

=== Proposed film version ===
In 2011 Rodda announced in an interview on Girl.com.au as part of the Australian Council of the Arts Get Reading! Program that she had sold the film rights to a "prominent Hollywood production company" and that she hopes it will be what her fans hope. The status of the project is currently unknown; however it is stated on her website that "There are no plans for a feature film at the moment."
