= Deltora Quest 3 =

2004 series of four books by Jennifer Rowe (as Emily Rodda)

- Dragon's Nest (2003); Shadowgate (2004); Isle of the Dead (2004); The Sister of the South (2004)
- Author: Emily Rodda
- Cover artist: Mark McBride
- Country: Australia
- Language: English
- Genre: Fantasy
- Publisher: Scholastic
- Published: 1 November 2003 – October 1, 2004
- Media type: Print (Paperback)
- No. of books: 4
- Preceded by: Deltora Quest 2

Deltora Quest 3 (known in North America as Dragons of Deltora) is a series of children's fantasy books, written by Australian author Emily Rodda. It follows the adventures of three companions, Lief, Barda, and Jasmine, as they journey across the magical land of Deltora to awaken the last seven dragons and destroy the Four Sisters (creations of the evil Shadow Lord, which have been poisoning Deltora's crops causing the people and creatures of the land to starve). It comprises four books which were first published in Australia in 2004 and 2005 in the United States by Scholastic. The Dragons of Deltora series is preceded by two other series that take place in the same fictional world and feature the same characters and continues the story. These series are Deltora Quest and Deltora Quest 2 (also known as Deltora Shadowlands). Collectively, these three series are known as the Deltora Quest series or the Deltora series.

The novels in this series are Dragon's Nest, Shadowgate, Isle of the Dead, and The Sister of the South.

== The Guardians of the Four Sisters ==
Just as the gems of Deltora had guardians in Deltora Quest, the Four Sisters each had a guardian to defend them. These guardians included:

=== Rolf ===
A Capricon and servant of the Shadow Lord, Rolf is the Guardian of the East who is first encountered in the Os-Mine Hills. In series three, he is captured by Granous and saved by Lief and his companions. Proclaiming that he is a prince, he is taken into Lief's party out of pity and later on believed to have been killed by a ruby dragon, though this is false. He is the one that takes the form of a ruby dragon and destroys the companions' escort. He tries to destroy the companions when they reach Dragon's Nest, but is defeated by the true Ruby Dragon and Lief.

=== Kirsten the Masked One ===
A woman that Lief, Barda, and Jasmine discover in a castle in the mountains. She was Mariette's sister and Bede's girlfriend until Bede chose Mariette over her. This made Kirsten bitter with resentment and so she allied herself with the Shadow Lord for vengeance. The Shadow Lord gave Kirsten magical powers and thus she became the Masked One, now a sorceress with the appearance of a black-cloaked figure with a green mask and pale hands that could kill others just by touching them. She used her power to enslave Bede and imprison Mariette in her locket. She also had the power to conjure phantoms of herself in Deltora, a technique she used to try to kill her enemies. In return she was given the task of guarding the Sister of the North. When Lief, Barda and Jasmine went to her castle, they at first thought that she is under Bede's power, however Bede was able to clue them in with his song. Kirsten almost killed Barda and Jasmine when she caused the walls of her castle to swallow them. However, as Lief jumped into the snake pit that the Sister of the North was contained within. The snakes in the pit latched onto Kirsten and bit her, killing her with their venom very slowly because Kirsten was protected by an enchanted spell.

=== Doran the Dragonlover ===
Also known as "Dragonfriend" by the dragons, Doran is Deltora's greatest explorer and was a kind and noble man. He developed everlasting friendships with Deltora's dragons and even explored Deltora's underworld and befriended the Pirran people that had sheltered themselves there. When the Ak-Baba killed nearly all of the dragons of Deltora, Doran went to each of the remaining dragons and had them go into a deep hibernation until they were woken by Adin's heir wearing the Belt. Doran then found out too late that the Dragons were an obstacle to the Shadow Lord's plan to plant the Four Sisters throughout Deltora and by having the dragons go into hibernation, Doran had removed this obstacle once and for all. Doran then drew a map to where the Four Sisters were located and asked the map to be delivered to the King, but the people of Deltora thought he was mad. His map was found by the Shadow Lord and torn into four pieces. Doran then went into the wilderness to find another way to get rid of the Sisters and was never seen again. Later it was revealed that the Shadow Lord had captured Doran and as punishment for resisting him, Doran was forced to become the immortal vessel of the Sister of the West (having the Sister contained inside his own body) and thus he was unwillingly forced to become the Guardian of the Sister of the West. He became situated in the Kobb's lair on the Isle of the Dead. Lief and his group managed to finally meet him and Doran was saddened to discover that the diamond dragon was dead, but was overcome with joy when he found out her daughter still lived. Veritas, the amethyst dragon, was forced to destroy Doran by stealing his breath in order to destroy the Sister of the West that he guarded, but knowing that the diamond dragon species still lived and that there was still hope for Deltora, Doran died a peaceful death as he disintegrated into dust.

=== Paff ===
When Ranesh left to Tora, this young girl took his place as assistant librarian to Josef, but it is revealed she is a servant of The Shadow Lord and guardian of The Sister of the South. She was made such in the Shadowlands, while her dark Master concocted his plan. As one of the cruelest guardians, she pumped Josef for information, and, when she had no further use for him, poisoned him. Far from punishing her, Doom and Lief pity her as she dies. Paff had gone willingly, it seems, to the Shadow Lord, partly because she hated everybody who did not appear to love her.

== Riddles & Codes ==
There are many riddles, poems and codes throughout the books. These are a few of them:

=== Map pieces ===
The four map pieces (East, North, West, and South) that were made by Doran the Dragonlover and helped Lief find the four sisters each had a fourth of a poem.

Sisters four with poisoned breath/ Bring to the land a long slow death.
But death comes swiftly if you dare/ To find each sisters hidden lair.
Their songs like secret rivers flow/ To hold the peril deep below.
And if at last their voices cease/ The land will find a final peace.

The companions thought that meant after they defeated all four Sisters the Shadow Lord might give up on trying to rule all of Deltora.

=== Sisters' warning stones ===
At the entrance to each Sister's lair there is an inscribed stone with a poem warning travelers away.

At the entrance to Dragon's Nest the stone inscription said:

Travellers do not pass this way, all are doomed who disobey.
Turn your faces to the west, death awaits in Dragon's Nest.

At the entrance to Kirsten's castle the poem was:

Do not enter this domain, flee this realm of fear and pain.
Death and terror both await, those who enter Shadowgate.

At the foot of the rock bridge on the Isle of the Dead the inscription said:

If you pass your fate is sealed, ahead pure evil lies concealed.
Turn while you have life and breath, flee this realm of living death.

Under the chapel altar in the palace the carved stone was different than the other three. Instead of a warning to travelers and passerby, it was a taunt to Lief himself. It read:

Lose and win? Or win and lose? Royal coward, you must choose.
Bow your head and creep away, or you and yours will curse this day.

=== Codes ===
The first code was from Fa-Glin. The code was just two paragraphs separated into groups of four letters. The code's translation said: I grieve to tell you that the new crop we pinned our hopes has been disappointing. The vines were sickly from the first, and only six baskets of small, sour fruit resulted from all our care. the yam harvest was also very bad, many of the yams having rotted in the ground. Hunting is poor. There are few fish in the stream. If only we could eat the fruit like our neighbours the Kin! The boolong trees thrive like the weeds they are, but all parts of them disagree with us. It will be another hard winter on Dread Mountain, I fear.
