= The Shifting Sands =

2001 Book by Jennifer Rowe (as Emily Rodda)

- First edition
- Author: Emily Rodda
- Cover artist: Marc Mcbride
- Language: English
- Series: Deltora Quest
- Genre: Fantasy novel
- Publisher: Scholastic
- Publication date: 2000
- Publication place: Australia
- Media type: Print (Paperback)
- Pages: 131
- ISBN: 0-439-25326-8
- OCLC: 47204404
- LC Class: CPB Box no. 1857 vol. 20
- Preceded by: City of the Rats
- Followed by: Dread Mountain

The Shifting Sands is the fourth book in the eight-volume Deltora Quest fantasy novel series written by Emily Rodda. It continues the trio's journey to find the seven missing gems of Deltora, braving dangers and Guardians in each book. The novel was first published in 2000 by Scholastic Australia.

== Plot ==
Following the events of City of the Rats, Lief, Barda and Jasmine leave the burning city to escape the plain it rests on, only to learn the plain was isolated from the rest of Deltora by a man-made channel to guard against the rats. As they cross the channel, they spot an Ak-Baba in the sky, investigating the burning City, and they hide in the river under Lief's cloak, being further concealed by the fish in the river. Once the threat has passed, they pass by an apple orchard and take some food, only to be confronted by the orchard's owner, Queen Bee, who initially threatens them with her dangerous hive of bees until Jasmine pays her with the last of their money. After Queen Bee learns they came from the City of the Rats, she guides them to the road and promises to conceal their presence.

After some time on the road, they reach the town of Rithmere and learn of the Rithmere Games, believing they can replenish their funds by winning. As they lack an entrance fee, Jasmine agrees to lend Kree to a local game operator, Ferdinand, to operate his Beat the Bird game in exchange for a silver coin. Ferdinand attempts to retain Kree after thirty spins against his word, but Kree exposes his game as rigged, and Ferdinand flees the angry crowd, leaving behind only a wooden bird that Jasmine takes. With only a silver coin, the group attempt to offer to earn more by working at the Champion Inn, but the innkeeper, Mother Brightly, allows them to enter the Rithmere Games despite their meager funds.

Entering the Games under false names, Lief, Barda and Jasmine learn that the games are fighting bouts, and they reconsider entering, but are unable to leave the inn. That night they see the scarred stranger they met at Tom's shop, and are attacked on their way to their room and their key stolen, though Jasmine manages to stab the attacker and drive them away. The following morning their door is locked to prevent them from attending the Games, but Barda is able to get Mother Brightly's attention from the window and secure their release.

After the first day of fighting, Lief, Barda and Jasmine all make it to the finals, as do Orwen and Joanna, a couple the trio met on the road to Rithmere, Neridah, an acrobat, Glock, a brutal and savage man, and the scarred man, Doom. The following day, Lief and Barda are defeated by Neridah and Doom, while Jasmine passes onto the finals by default after Orwen abandons their match to rescue Joanna from Glock, who defeats them both. Before the finals can begin, Glock and Neridah are drugged by a serving boy that knows Doom, leaving Jasmine to fight and defeat Doom in the finals, winning one-thousand gold coins. Congratulating them, Mother Brightly offers a secret passage from the inn so they can leave discreetly and avoid robbery, but the trio are ambushed and captured by Grey Guards to be taken to the Shadowlands. Fortunately, Doom frees them during the night, revealing that he is the leader of the Resistance against the Shadow Lord and that word of the trio's deeds has begun to spread. He had entered the Games to determine that they were being used as a cover by the Shadow Lord to gather prisoners to fight in the Shadow Arena. Doom offers sanctuary to them, but they refuse, unwilling to trust him with the knowledge of their quest and part on bad terms.

As they approach the Shifting Sands, Lief starts to hear voices and reads a worn warning about the Sands before they enter. As they explore the desert, they hear their Grey Guard captors pursuing them and hide in the sand; the Guards try to dig for them, but are ambushed and devoured by a Sand Beast. After the Sand Beast leaves, the Grey Guards' belongings, including the winnings from the Rithmere Games, vanish, leaving only images of them in the sand; Lief disturbing them causes the Sands to change around them and Jasmine to lose one of her daggers, which likewise vanishes and is marked by an image in the sand. When they light a fire to stay warm at night, the Sands forcibly separate them and Lief runs away in madness, seeing visions of Queen Bee informing them she has to use smoke to calm her bees to retrieve their honey. Barda and Jasmine reunite with Lief, saving him from another Sand Beast using the Grey Guards' poisonous blister weapons, and Lief explains that the Sand Beasts are not the guardian of the gem, but the Sands themselves are, serving the Hive at the Center of the Sands. They arrive at the Center, a hollow tunnel into the depths of the Sands, and Lief uses a smoking torch to keep the Hive at bay as he is lowered into the Center, where the Hive has built a tower of bones and treasures to house its eggs and where Lief finds the lapis-lazuli and Jasmine's dagger. He replaces the lapis-lazuli with Jasmine's wooden bird to keep the structure of piling treasures stable, before having Barda pull him out of the Hive and using the talisman powers of the lapis-lazuli to allow them to safely leave the Sands.

== Characters ==
- Lief: Lief is the main character of the series. Lief was born to parents King Endon and Queen Sharn though he believed them to be Jarred and Anna of the forge. As a child Lief roamed the streets of Del, sharpening his wits and gaining him the skills needed for his future quests. Though he did not know it, he was constantly protected by Barda and he prided himself on his many 'lucky' escapes. On his sixteenth birthday it is revealed to him that he must begin a dangerous quest to find the lost gems of the Belt of Deltora.
- Barda: Barda was enlisted as a friend by the king and queen of Deltora and was trusted to help him find the lost gems of Deltora sixteen years before the initial story took place. For the next sixteen years Barda disguised himself as a beggar so as to discover information vital to the quest. He also became the bodyguard of Endon and Sharn's child Lief, albeit without the semi-arrogant Lief's knowledge thereof. Upon Lief's sixteenth birthday Barda revealed himself to Lief and the quest for the gems of Deltora began. Though Barda was at first annoyed to travel encumbered by a child, he soon saw Lief as more of a help than a hindrance.
- Jasmine: Jasmine is a wild girl, described as having wild black hair (dark green hair in the anime) and emerald green eyes who has grown up in the Forests of Silence, where Lief and Barda meet her shortly after leaving Del. Her parents, Jarred and Anna, were captured by Grey Guards when she was seven years old, and so she has been raised by the forest. She can understand the language of the trees and of many animals, and has incredibly sharp senses, but has trouble understanding some social customs. Jasmine is usually seen with her raven, Kree, and a mouse-like creature she calls Filli. Jasmine is like Lief and occasionally has a quick temper. After helping Lief and Barda in the forest and with the help of the topaz, she is greeted by her mother's spirit from beyond the grave, who tells her to go with Lief and Barda in their quest. After this encounter, she joins Lief and Barda in the search for the great gems that will complete the Belt.

== See also ==
- Deltora Quest 1
- Deltora series
- Emily Rodda
- Characters in the Deltora series
