= Deltora Quest 2 =

2002 series of three books by Jennifer Rowe (as Emily Rodda)

- Cavern of the Fear (2002); The Isle of Illusion (2002); The Shadowlands (2002)
- Author: Emily Rodda
- Cover artist: Mark McBride
- Country: Australia
- Language: English
- Genre: Fantasy
- Publisher: Scholastic
- Published: 1 February 2002 – 1 May 2002
- Media type: Print (Paperback)
- No. of books: 3
- Preceded by: Deltora Quest 1
- Followed by: Deltora Quest 3

Deltora Quest 2 (known in North America as Deltora Shadowlands) is a series of children’s fantasy books, written by Australian author Emily Rodda. It follows the adventures of three companions as they journey outside the magical land of Deltora to rescue the many prisoners held captive by the evil Shadow Lord.

The series comprises three books: Cavern of the Fear, The Isle of Illusion, and The Shadowlands. They were first published in Australia in 2002 by Scholastic, and republished in one book in 2005.

The Deltora Shadowlands series is associated with a series that takes place in the same fictional world and feature the same characters, collectively known as the Deltora Quest series.

== Plot ==
In the series, King Lief must find out how to save his kingdom. Although he has defeated the enemy, Deltora is rotting away - the Shadow Lord had taken thousands of Deltorans as slaves back to the Shadowlands. Lief and his friends must re-unite three pieces of the magical Pirran Pipe - the only thing the Shadow Lord fears - to save his people.

=== Cavern of the Fear ===
In the beginning, King Lief leaves Del and goes to Tora, seemingly to find a bride. While he is away, Jasmine discovers the crystal Prandine used to contact the Shadow Lord with. It shows her little sister Faith, trapped in the Shadowlands. Meanwhile, the Deltoran Annals (a history of Deltora) are brought back by the chief librarian Josef when he returns from hiding and Lief learns of the Pirran Pipe, the only thing the Shadow Lord fears. What is now the Shadowlands was once the land of Pirra. It was protected by the magical music of the Pirran Pipe. But one day, the Piper died. Three people vied to become the new Piper: Plumes, Auron and Keras. Through the machinations of the evil Shadow Lord, the people of Pirra could not decide who would replace the old Piper. He suggested they divide the pipe into three. So they did; the instrument could not be played, Pirra was unprotected and the Shadow Lord could invade. The people fled to a secret underground sea. They split into three tribes and went to live on the islands of Plumes, Auron and Keras. Each tribe kept a different piece of the pipe and kept to themselves.

Before they can investigate the Pipe further, Lief and Barda learn from Jinks the acrobat that Jasmine has run off to the Shadowlands with Glock. Lief leaves his 'bride' Marilen in Del, while he pursues Jasmine. Jasmine had read another story of a secret way to the Shadowlands through the Os-Mine Hills. She hopes to rescue her sister, as Glock hopes to rescue the remnants of his tribe. Lief and Barda follow her and, after escaping capture by the Granous (and Jinks fleeing back to Del) find a secret under-world. They discover the secret sea and are captured by the Plumes, who are also holding Jasmine and Glock captive. The Plumes come to trust them and free the four Deltorans so they can attempt to defeat the Fear (a giant squid will flood the island if not provided with sacrifices). In the fight, Glock is mortally wounded by the Fear and bestows his tribe's talisman on Jasmine. Glock dies and Lief asks the Plumes to give him the first piece of the Pipe. They tell him it was stolen by the Jalis (Glock's tribe) many years before. Jasmine looks at the talisman and it turns out to be the first piece of the Pirran Pipe.

=== The Isle of Illusion ===
The companions travel to the island of Auron, only to find it has been abandoned for many years, its people having taken to living on rafts instead. The other members of the tribe live within a magic dome containing an illusion of Pirra. The people who did not want to live an illusion left for the rafts, but with their magic inside the dome, the light inside the cave is fading, and the Arach (giant spiders), who dwell in darkness, have taken over the rest of the island. Swinging on ropes to get past the Arach and into the dome, they find that only one person, the old Piper Auris, has remained behind to maintain the illusion. Their denial of the illusion causes the dome to partially collapse. Now that the light is restored, the Arach seek shelter inside the remnants of the dome, and kill Auris, whose death causes the dome to collapse and the Arach to flee. The companions retrieve the second part of the Pipe and move on.

Meanwhile, in Del, Jinks tries to steal the royal jewels and flee the city, but accidentally eats poisoned food intended for Marilen. It is discovered that it was poisoned by Amarantz, Josef's friend from the resistance who was working as a cook, and that the Shadow Lord is using worms implanted in the brains of former captives to control their minds, explaining the recent attempts on Lief's life.

=== The Shadowlands ===
The three companions travel to the island of Keras and receive the last piece to complete the Pirran Pipe. King Lief gives the Piper of Keras the Belt of Deltora for safe-keeping, and her son Emlis goes with Lief, Barda and Jasmine to the Shadowlands. They come back up and meet a resistance gang led by Claw. They hope to surprise the Shadow Lord so they can reach the place where the slaves are being held. They go to the Factory and encounter a Vraal. They see their old friend Tira there; they also find out that the slaves are at the Shadow Arena. Lief, Barda and Jasmine sneak into the Arena just as the Shadow Lord is about to wipe the slaves' memories with worms that will control their minds. Jasmine reaches Faith only to find out her 'little sister' was an illusion used to lure Jasmine, and by extension Lief, into the Shadowlands. The Piper's son, Emlis, starts playing the Pirran Pipe and Lief, Barda, Jasmine, Claw, Emlis and all of the slaves are teleported back to the secret sea by the Keras, as the Pirran tribes can transport people between the surface and the caves, and heard the Pipe's music. The Plume, Auron and Keras peoples re-unite and the freed slaves return to Deltora.

Lief returns to Marilen in Del. It is revealed that although the descendants of Adin's first child only had one child, with Lief the only descendant of that line, Adin himself had five children, and that Marilen, a descendant of Adin's second child, was the next in line to the throne of Deltora. Lief had a fake belt made and had taken it on his journey. He had left Marilen in Del wearing the real Belt of Deltora, so that if anything had happened to him, Marilen would become Queen. The series then ends with a hinted romance between Lief and Jasmine.

== Awards ==
- 2004 COOL Award - Fiction for Younger Readers Award
- 2004 KOALA - Younger Readers Award
- 2004 Young Australians Best Book Awards (YABBA) - Younger Readers Award
- 2004 YARA Award
