= Deltora Quest (TV series) =

Japanese anime series

- First DVD cover

デルトラクエスト (Derutora Kuesuto)
- Genre: Adventure, fantasy
- Anime television series
- Directed by: Mitsuru Hongo
- Music by: Kow Otani
- Studio: OLM, Inc.
- Licensed by: AU: Madman Entertainment; NA: Cinedigm
- Original network: TXN (TV Aichi)
- English network: AU: ABC3, Cartoon Network; US: The Hub
- Original run: January 6, 2007 – March 29, 2008
- Episodes: 65
- icon

Deltora Quest (Japanese: デルトラ・クエスト, Hepburn: Derutora Kuesuto) is a Japanese anime television series based on the series of children's books of the same name, written by Australian author Emily Rodda. It was announced by Rodda herself at Sydney's Book Council of Australia Conference and at an ABC Kids convention. The series was produced by Genco and SKY Perfect Well Think. It was broadcast for 65 episodes on TV Aichi from January 2007 to March 2008. It began airing on Cartoon Network Australia and New Zealand in May 2010. It premiered in the United States on The Hub on October 10, 2010.

== Story ==
The Shadow Lord, an evil sorcerer from the Shadowlands and The Lord of Shadows, has taken over Deltora by destroying the magical Belt of Deltora, which is Deltora's only protection against him, and scattering the seven gems that give it power. On his sixteenth birthday, Lief, son of Jarred the blacksmith of Deltora's capital city Del, and his wife Anna, is given the repaired Belt and told the truth; that his father was the best friend of the former king, Endon, and helped him escape with his wife and unborn child when the Shadow Lord took over. Accompanied by Barda, a former palace guard, and given a map of Deltora showing where the seven gems of the Belt are believed to be, Lief sets out to restore the gems to the Belt and save the land. Their first destination is the Forests of Silence.

After meeting Jasmine, a girl who has been alone since her parents were taken by the Shadow Lord's soldiers when she was seven, Lief and Barda are directed to the location of the first gem. After destroying the guardian Gorl, they find the Topaz and continue to the Lake of Tears, with Jasmine joining them after being encouraged by the spirit of her now-deceased mother. Along the way, they meet Manus, a silent man who helps them defeat Jin and Jod, two of the sorceress Thaegan's thirteen children. After discovering the existence of a resistance against the Shadow Lord, they reach the Lake and persuade the gem's guardian, the monster Soldeen, to give it to them. However, they are forced to fight Thaegan and retrieve the Ruby. Thaegan is defeated when Jasmine's raven, Kree, cuts her finger, causing her to lose blood. Since Thaegan is a witch, she dies as a result, restoring the Lake to its former appearance, Soldeen and the other creatures in the Lake to their original human forms, and the voices of Manus and his people, the Ralads.

On their way to the next gem, the trio are trapped by Thaegan's remaining eleven children, but manage to fool them and escape. They then visit a mysterious shop owned by Tom and meet Doom, a scar-faced man who is part of the resistance. After finding and escaping from Noradz, a city revealed to be supplying the Shadow Lord's servants with food, they manage to reach the City of Rats. There, Lief, Barda and Jasmine defeat the giant snake Reeah and get the Opal. However, after losing their remaining money, they are forced to enter the deadly Rithmere Championships to raise funds. Jasmine wins, but they are subsequently captured. With help from Doom, who also competed, and his friend Dain, who was disguised as a server, they manage to escape and reach the Shifting Sands, where they obtain the fourth gem, the Lapis Lazuli, from the living Hive.

Attempting to travel to Dread Mountain, they are trapped by Thaegan, who has been revived by the Shadow Lord, but manage to destroy her again, along with four of her children. They encounter the Kin, a race of sentient animals who help them travel to Dread Mountain as they are pursued by the Shadow Lord's elite soldiers, the Carn Squad. On Dread Mountain, they defeat the monstrous toad Gellick with the help of the Dread Gnomes, who form an alliance with the Kin, and retrieve the Emerald. Along the way, they discover the years-old grave of another man named Doom and realize that the man they know is not who he claims to be. Lief also discovers that his parents have been taken captive by Fallow, the Shadow Lord's advisor, but his friends persuade him that the only way to save them is to complete the quest.

Traveling toward the Maze of the Beast, they encounter Dain, who saves them from two Ols, shapeshifting servants of the Shadow Lord. He directs them to a stronghold of the resistance, but Doom, revealed to be the leader, distrusts them and has them locked up. Dain helps them escape on the condition that they bring him to the city of Tora. They go on the boat the River Queen, but are attacked by pirates, who kidnap Dain before leaving after learning that some of the passengers are Ols. To avoid putting the other passengers in danger, the trio are dropped off nearby. After being found by the pirates again, they are sent into the Maze of the Beast and are able to find the Amethyst, barely escaping the slug-like Glus.

The Shadow Lord revives Thaegan again, and she attempts to defeat them with their worst fears, but they triumph over her once more and leave her to destroy herself along with all but one of her remaining children, Ichabod. Pursued by both the Carn Squad and the pyrokinetic sorcerer Oacus, they rescue Dain and find Tora, empty of its people after they broke a magical vow to shelter King Endon. Shortly after they arrive, they encounter Doom, who reveals that he escaped the Shadowlands after receiving his scar and was rescued by the other Doom, who was killed by the Shadow Lord's minions when they pursued him. However, he does not remember anything before this, including his name, which is why he uses the other man's name. While Doom and Dain leave to return to the resistance, the trio journey to the Valley of the Lost and defeat the guardian, retrieving the last gem, the Diamond, after fighting Oacus.

Doom and Dain arrive at the Valley, revealed to now be home to the people of Tora, and are eventually informed about the quest to restore the gems. Doom agrees to help them find the heir, and arranges a meeting of members of the seven tribes of Deltora at another resistance stronghold near Del. At the stronghold, they are once again attacked by the Carn Squad and realize that there is a spy among them, but the tribes unite and kill their attackers. When they all swear loyalty to the new heir, Lief comes to believe that Dain is Endon's child, but he is kidnapped by Ichabod and brought to Del. The group journeys to Del, defeating Oacus for the final time along the way, and rescues Dain, killing Ichabod in the process.

However, when Dain is given the Belt, he reveals himself to be an Ol spy and has them ambushed. Most of the resistance escapes, but Barda, Jasmine and Doom are captured, while Lief manages to kill Dain and retrieve the Belt. Doom, who suffered a head injury in the capture, remembers his past and that he is Jasmine's long-lost father, before they are rescued by Lief and the Kin. Lief suspects Jasmine of being the heir, but she maintains that she is not. When Fallow threatens to kill Lief's parents if they do not surrender, the people of Del come to the resistance's aid, and the Shadow Lord's forces, including Fallow, are defeated, while Jarred and Anna are rescued.

Jarred and Doom recognize each other and reveal the truth; Jarred is King Endon, while Doom is the real Jarred, with them having switched identities to protect the heir to the throne, Lief. However, Fallow is revealed to still be alive and attacks Endon before being stopped by Lief. The Shadow Lord's minions, including the seven Ak-Baba, dragon-like birds who hid the gems, attack the people, but Lief eventually kills Fallow, though the gems are scattered from the Belt in the process. The Shadow Lord arrives to destroy the resistance, but Lief manages to put the gems back on the Belt in the right order (Diamond, Emerald, Lapis Lazuli, Topaz, Opal, Ruby, Amethyst, spelling "Deltora") before wearing it, banishing the Shadow Lord. A fatally wounded Endon thanks Lief for saving the people when he could not and dies peacefully, and Lief becomes the new king of the now united Deltora.

== Characters ==
Lief
Voiced by: Ryosuke Sakamaki (Japanese); Cole Howard (English)
Lief is the son of a blacksmith, who lives in the rundown city of Del. Described by Barda as 'A young hot-head', he spends his time roaming the streets while both tempting and dodging trouble. On his sixteenth birthday, he leaves Del on his father's quest to find the magical gems missing from the Belt of Deltora and the heir destined to wear it. Lief is tempted in many ways and, by the end of the first series, he has grown not only in bravery and strength, but also in wisdom and patience. During the series, he competes in a contest in which he describes his special skill as speed. Lief is courageous and trustworthy. He shows romantic interest in Jasmine, even though they do not always see eye to eye. While he occasionally considers giving up the quest, the thought of his friends or allies suffering always helps him to continue.
Barda
Voiced by: Yuusaku Yara (Japanese); Tom Edwards (English)
At the start of the series, Barda appears to be a poor beggar living on the streets of Del. He is revealed to be a skilled swordsman and ex-palace guard who assumes the role of protector to Lief, much to their dismay. He is about the same age as Lief's parents. He is the son of Min, who was the childhood nurse maid of Endon and Jarred before being killed by Prandine when she warned King Endon that he was being deceived, but he did not believe her. During the series, Barda competes in a contest in which he describes his special skill as strength. He helps Lief and Jasmine along the quest and is always strong-hearted, never gives up hope, and is a gentle giant.
Jasmine
Voiced by: Ayahi Takagaki (Japanese); Laura Rushfeldt (English)
Jasmine is a sixteen year old wild orphan girl who lives a solitary life in the dangerous Forests of Silence. After her parents were taken by the Shadow Lord's soldiers, she grew up alone and learned to fend for herself. She has messy black hair which frames her elfin face and green eyes. She is often described as impatient and lonely, but with a good heart. Her only friends in the Forests are the raven Kree and a small furry animal called Filli, who she can communicate with due to understanding the language of trees and many other animals. She is independent, like Lief, though displays less tact and is unafraid of standing up for what she believes in if she feels something is unjust or incorrect. She believes in equal rights and fairness, but cannot understand people who will not fight for themselves and how easily people can be tricked by fancy words and promises. In the series, she is eventually reunited with her long-lost father and competes in a contest in which she describes her special skill as agility. She shows romantic interest in Lief, even though they do not always see eye to eye.
Kree
Voiced by: Miyako Ito (Japanese); Tony Valdez (English)
Kree is a raven who was adopted by Jasmine, who he can communicate with, after his family was eaten by the sorceress Thaegan. He joins Lief, Barda and Jasmine on their quest. When they head to the Lake of Tears, he is sent back to the Forests of Silence for his own protection, but returns to help them and stays with them afterwards. He is often used to scout ahead.
Filli
Voiced by: Chigusa Ikeda (Japanese); Tony Valdez (English)
Filli is a small, rodent-like creature who is Jasmine's pet and can communicate with her. Like Kree, he joins the companions when Jasmine decides to accompany them on their quest, but can also get them into trouble.
The Shadow Lord
Voiced by: Banjou Ginga (Japanese); Mike Shepherd (English)
The Shadow Lord is a malevolent entity who has taken over the land of Deltora after destroying its protection against him, the Belt of Deltora, and scattering the gems that give it power. He resides in the Shadowlands, beyond the mountains of Deltora, but regularly communicates with Fallow, his servant who runs his operations in Deltora from the palace of Del. He frequently has Fallow send servants to stop the trio from continuing their quest, and expresses fury when they fail. He is shown to be a master schemer, never having just one plan.
Dain
Voiced by: Mitsuki Saiga (Japanese); Arlen Konopaki (English)
Dain is introduced as a waiter during the contest Lief, Barda, and Jasmine compete in. He is later shown to be a member of a resistance against the Shadow Lord, and appears to come from Tora, a magical city that many of the royal family's consorts also came from. He and Jasmine show romantic interest in each other. He is implied to be the long lost son of King Endon and the heir to the throne, but it is later revealed that he is actually a servant of the Shadow Lord whose purpose is to trick the resistance into thinking that this is the case. He attempts to replace Fallow as the Shadow Lord's second-in-command.
Doom
Doom is first encountered as a scar-faced stranger at a shop the companions stop at to get supplies, where he is revealed to be part of a resistance against the Shadow Lord. The companions later encounter him again when competing in a contest, where he saves them from the Shadow Lord's servants and attempts to get them to join the resistance, though they refuse. They later find out he is not who he says he is when they find an old grave of a man who has the same name as him. When they meet him again, they learn that he is the leader of the resistance, and escape after he does not trust them. He eventually reveals to them that he does not remember his real name or past due to torture in the Shadowlands. They eventually tell him everything, and he agrees to help them find the heir. After suffering a head injury, he regains his memory, including that he is the long lost father of Jasmine.
Neridah
Voiced by: Rie Kugimiya (Japanese); Shannon Casorso (English)
Neridah is a woman Lief's age who competes with the companions in a contest, where she charms Lief. She is saved by Doom from the Shadow Lord's servants and joins the resistance, but later leaves to join the companions after hearing about their quest, charming Lief into allowing it. She nearly ruins their plan by stealing the last gem, but they manage to reclaim it before she leaves, taking their remaining money.
Glock
Glock is a large, aggressive man who competes with the companions in a contest. He is saved by Doom from the Shadow Lord's servants and joins the resistance. He is later revealed to be the only remaining member of one of the original seven tribes of Deltora, requiring him to help them. He clashes with Jasmine when they meet again, but they come to terms after saving each other's lives.
Fallow
Voiced by: Masashi Ebara (Japanese); Stewart Burdett (English)
Fallow is the Shadow Lord's advisor, who rules Deltora from the capital city of Del and regularly communicates with his master in the Shadowlands. He sends out other minions to find the companions when they begin to recover the gems, while the Shadow Lord threatens him after becoming displeased with his lack of progress. He eventually captures Lief's parents, but is unable to get any information from them. Despite his efforts, the companions succeed in their quest and eventually return to Del, where he unsuccessfully leads the attempt to stop them. He dislikes Dain, who attempts to steal his position.
Sorceress Thaegan
Sorceress Thaegan is an evil sorceress who allies with the Shadow Lord. A hundred years before the events of the series, she took over a portion of Deltora and warped it to her liking, also being responsible for eating Kree's family. She also has thirteen monstrous children who she has some affection for. She is killed by the companions early on in the series, but later revived by the Shadow Lord after he sees her potential and sent to stop them. After this fails, the Shadow Lord revives her again and gives her a final chance, but she destroys herself after failing.
Gla-Thon
A Dread Gnome who lives on Dread Mountain. Like her people, she likes riches and is an excellent archer. After helping the companions defeat the monster oppressing her people and giving them a gem, she later joins them in trying to find the heir, and participates in the battle for Del.
Anna
Anna is Lief's mother and wife of Jarred, the blacksmith of Del. She makes a cloak for her son that is later revealed to make those covered by it invisible on his sixteenth birthday before he goes on the quest. Her memory, and that of her husband, keeps Lief going. She and Jarred are later shown to have been captured by Fallow, though they do not give up any information. They are later saved by the companions and the resistance and reveal the truth.
Jarred
Voiced by: Hidetoshi Nakamura (Japanese); Chris Heward (English)
Jarred is Lief's father and the blacksmith of Del. He makes a sword for his son on his sixteenth birthday before he goes on the quest. He also reveals that he once lived in the palace and was a friend of King Endon, helping him and his wife escape when the Shadow Lord invaded. His memory, and that of his wife, keeps Lief going. He and Anna are later shown to have been captured by Fallow, though they do not give up any information. They are later saved by the companions and the resistance and reveal the truth.

== Production ==
The series was produced by Genco and the animation production at OLM and SKY Perfect Well Think. Rodda was originally approached with many film offers, but it was only this studio that promised to not change the story. The first episode was aired on January 6, 2007, in Japan.

It was directed by Mitsuru Hongō, designed by Hiroyuki Nishimura and Junya Ishigaki, and written by Oketani Arawa, Reiko Yoshida, and Natsuko Takahashi. The music was composed by Kow Otani, but was replaced with an original soundtrack in the English version.

Although the series employs mostly traditional animation, it uses CGI for the Guardians.

Deltora Quest was originally licensed in North America by Geneon as one of their final licenses but shut down before doing anything with the series. The series was then rescued by Dentsu's newly established North American branch, and they produced an English version of the series in association with Ocean Productions in Vancouver, British Columbia and recorded at their Calgary-based Blue Water Studios. All music for the English version was composed and produced by John Mitchell and Tom Keenlyside at Anitunes Music Inc.

Due to the series' popularity in Japan, it was extended to 65 episodes from the original 52, containing stories not present in the original novels. The English dub restores the ending of the original novels, and ignores the 13 added episodes in the anime.

Cinedigm released the series onto DVD in a complete boxset on May 13, 2014.

== Music ==
=== Opening theme ===
1. HEART☆BEAT by Maria (episodes 1–28)
2. "Boku no Taiyō" (僕の太陽) by AKB48 (episodes 29–52)
3. "'In This Life~Tabidachi made no 3 Step" (In This Life~旅立ちまでの3ステップ) by Delta Goodrem (episodes 53–65)

=== Ending theme ===
1. "Sakura Uta" (桜唄) by Rythem (episodes 1–14)
2. "Hey Now!" by Coolon (episodes 15–26)
3. "Go to Fly" by Sunbrain (episodes 27–39)
4. "Yume x Yume" (夢x夢) by Yurika Ohyama (episodes 40–52)
5. "Yubikiri Genman" (ユビキリゲンマン) by Hoi festa (episodes 53–65)

The English version uses an original instrumental composed by John Lee Mitchell and Tom Keenlyside for Anitunes Music Inc.

== Episodes ==
No.	Title	Original release date	English air date
1	"The Adventure Begins" (Lief on an Adventurous Journey); Transliteration: "Rīfu, Bōken no Tabi e" (Japanese: リーフ冒険の旅へ)	January 6, 2007	October 10, 2010
2	"Jasmine, Girl of the Forest" (Jasmine, Girl of the Forest); Transliteration: "Mori no Shōjo Jasumin" (Japanese: 森の少女ジャスミン)	January 13, 2007	October 12, 2010
3	"The Golden Knight" (The Golden Knight Gorl); Transliteration: "Ōgon no Kishi Gōru" (Japanese: 黄金の騎士ゴール)	January 20, 2007	October 13, 2010
4	"The Enigmatic Giant" (The Enigmatic Giant's Curse); Transliteration: "Nazonazo Kyojin no Noroi" (Japanese: ナゾナゾ巨人の呪い)	January 27, 2007	October 14, 2010
5	"Nij and Doj's Trap" (Nij and Doj's Trap); Transliteration: "Nij to Doj no Wana" (Japanese: ニジとドッジのわな)	February 3, 2007	October 15, 2010
6	"The Monster in the Lake of Tears" (The Monster Living in the Lake of Grief); Transliteration: "Nageki no Mizuumi ni Sumu Kaibutsu" (Japanese: 嘆きの湖にすむ怪物)	February 10, 2007	October 18, 2010
7	"Sorceress Thaegan" (Sorceress Thaegan Appears); Transliteration: "Majo Tēgan Arawaru" (Japanese: 魔女テーガン現る)	February 17, 2007	October 19, 2010
8	"Tom's Curious Shop" (Tom's Curious Shop); Transliteration: "Tomu no Fushigi na Mise" (Japanese: トムのふしぎな店)	February 24, 2007	October 20, 2010
9	"Noradz the Clean" (Clean Noradzeer!); Transliteration: "Kurīn Churunai" (Japanese: クリーンチュルナイ!)	March 3, 2007	October 21, 2010
10	"Escape" (Escape From Prison); Transliteration: "Rōgoku kara no Dasshutsu" (Japanese: 牢獄からの脱出)	March 10, 2007	October 22, 2010
11	"Cross the River" (Cross the Broad River); Transliteration: "Habahirogawa wo Watare" (Japanese: はばひろ川を渡れ)	March 17, 2007	October 25, 2010
12	"The King of the Rats" (The King of Rat City); Transliteration: "Ratto Shiti no Ō" (Japanese: ラット・シティの王)	March 24, 2007	October 26, 2010
13	"Endon and Jarred" (Endon and Jarred); Transliteration: "Endon to Jādo" (Japanese: エンドンとジャード)	March 31, 2007	October 27, 2010
14	"The Stolen Gems" (The Stolen Gems); Transliteration: "Ubawareta Hōseki" (Japanese: うばわれた宝石)	April 7, 2007	October 28, 2010
15	"Good Luck! Bad Luck!" (Good Luck? Bad Luck?); Transliteration: "Un ga ii? Warui?" (Japanese: 運がいい? わるい?)	April 14, 2007	October 29, 2010
16	"The Rithmere Games" (The Rithmete Games Tournament); Transliteration: "Risumea Kyōgi Taikai" (Japanese: リスメア競技大会)	April 21, 2007	November 1, 2010
17	"Test of Endurance" (Fight, Fight Lief!); Transliteration: "Tatakae! Tatakae Rīfu" (Japanese: 戦え! 戦えリーフ)	April 28, 2007	November 2, 2010
18	"Jasmine vs. Doom" (Jasmine and the Mysterious Man); Transliteration: "Jasumin to Nazo no Otoko" (Japanese: ジャスミンと謎の男)	May 5, 2007	November 3, 2010
19	"The Boy from the Resistance" (Boy of the Resistance); Transliteration: "Rejisutansu no Shōnen" (Japanese: レジスタンスの少年)	May 12, 2007	November 4, 2010
20	"The Shifting Sands" (Monster of the Squirming Sands); Transliteration: "Ugomeku Suna no Kaibutsu" (Japanese: うごめく砂の怪物)	May 19, 2007	November 5, 2010
21	"The Heavenly Stone" (The Spiritual Stone, Lapis Lazuli); Transliteration: "Kami no Ishi Rapisu Razuri" (Japanese: 神の石ラピスラズリ)	May 26, 2007	November 8, 2010
22	"Thaegan's Return" (Sorceress Thaegan's Revival); Transliteration: "Majo Tēgan no Fukkatsu" (Japanese: 魔女テーガンの復活)	June 2, 2007	November 9, 2010
23	"Thaegan's Trap" (Fearful Thaegan's Trap); Transliteration: "Kyōfu Tēgan no Wana" (Japanese: 恐怖テーガンのわな)	June 9, 2007	November 10, 2010
24	"Meeting Prin" (Meeting Prin); Transliteration: "Purin tono Deai" (Japanese: プリンとの出会い)	June 16, 2007	November 11, 2010
25	"Kin to the Air" (Fly, Kin! To the Air); Transliteration: "Kin yo Tobe! Ōzora e" (Japanese: キンよ飛べ! 大空へ)	June 23, 2007	November 12, 2010
26	"Vraal Attack" (Assault! The Monster Vraal); Transliteration: "Kyūshū! Kaibutsu Burāru" (Japanese: 急襲! 怪物ブラール)	June 30, 2007	November 15, 2010
27	"Trapped under Dread Mountain" (The One Lurking in Dread Mountain); Transliteration: "Kyōfu no Yama ni Hisomu Mono" (Japanese: 恐怖の山にひそむ者)	July 7, 2007	November 16, 2010
28	"The Great Gellick" (Defeat the Great Gellick!); Transliteration: "Kyodai Gerikku wo Taose" (Japanese: 巨大ゲリックを倒せ)	July 14, 2007	November 17, 2010
29	"End of the Carn Squad" (Strike the Carn Squad!); Transliteration: "Kān Butai wo Tatake!" (Japanese: カーン部隊を叩け!)	July 21, 2007	November 18, 2010
30	"The Mysterious Ols" (The New Monsters, Ols); Transliteration: "Aratanaru Kaibutsu Oru" (Japanese: 新たなる怪物オル)	July 28, 2007	November 19, 2010
31	"Goodbye, Jasmine" (Goodbye, Jasmine); Transliteration: "Sayonara, Jasumin" (Japanese: さよならジャスミン)	August 4, 2007	November 22, 2010
32	"The River Queen" (The River Queen); Transliteration: "Ribā Kuīn-Gō" (Japanese: リバークイーン号)	August 11, 2007	November 23, 2010
33	"Pirate Attack" (Lief in a Close Call); Transliteration: "Rīfu, Kikiippatsu" (Japanese: リーフ、危機一髪)	August 18, 2007	November 24, 2010
34	"The Pirates' Feast" (The Pirates' Feast); Transliteration: "Tōzoku-tachi no Utage" (Japanese: 盗賊たちのうたげ)	August 25, 2007	November 29, 2010
35	"Maze of the Beast" (The Cave of Monster Glue); Transliteration: "Kaibutsu Gurū no Doukutsu" (Japanese: 怪物グルーの洞くつ)	September 1, 2007	November 30, 2010
36	"Sorceress Thaegan is Back!" (Sorceress Theagan's Counterattack); Transliteration: "Majo Tēgan no Gyakushū" (Japanese: 魔女テーガンの逆襲)	September 8, 2007	December 1, 2010
37	"Mirror of Fear" (Thaegan and Her Children); Transliteration: "Tēgan to Kodomo-tachi" (Japanese: テーガンと子ども達)	September 15, 2007	December 2, 2010
38	"Sorcerer Oacus" (Sorcerer Oacus Appears); Transliteration: "Madoushi Ōkasu Arawaru" (Japanese: 魔導士オーカス現る)	September 22, 2007	December 6, 2010
39	"The Vow of the Torans" (The Vow of the Torans); Transliteration: "Tōra-zoku no Chikai" (Japanese: トーラ族の誓い)	September 29, 2007	December 7, 2010
40	"The Valley of the Lost" (Guardian of the Forbidden Valley); Transliteration: "Imashime no Tani no Bannin" (Japanese: いましめの谷の番人)	October 6, 2007	December 8, 2010
41	"The Last Gem" (Last One, the Diamond); Transliteration: "Saigo no Daiyamondo" (Japanese: 最後のダイヤモンド)	October 13, 2007	December 9, 2010
42	"The Seven Gems United" (When the Seven Gems Meet); Transliteration: "Nanatsu no Hōseki ga Tsudou Toki" (Japanese: 七つの宝石が集う時)	October 20, 2007	December 13, 2010
43	"Nevets Goes Wild" (Nevets' Great Rampage); Transliteration: "Sukāru Daibōsō" (Japanese: スカール大暴走!)	October 27, 2007	December 14, 2010
44	"Battle at Withick Mire" (Attack and Defence of Vetaxa Village); Transliteration: "Betakusa Mura no Kōbō" (Japanese: ベタクサ村の攻防)	November 3, 2007	December 15, 2010
45	"The Oath" (Lief and the Oath Ceremony); Transliteration: "Rīfu, Chikai no Gishiki" (Japanese: リーフ、誓いの儀式)	November 10, 2007	December 16, 2010
46	"The Last Battle of Fire" (The Last of Old Enemy Oacus); Transliteration: "Shukuteki Ōkasu no Saigo" (Japanese: 宿敵オーカスの最後)	November 17, 2007	December 20, 2010
47	"The Seven Tribes" (Charge! The Seven Tribes); Transliteration: "Shingekise yo! Shichi Buzoku" (Japanese: 進撃せよ! 七部族)	November 24, 2007	December 21, 2010
48	"Who is Dain?" (The True Colours of Good Friend Dain); Transliteration: "Shin'yuu Dein no Shōtai" (Japanese: 親友デインの正体)	December 1, 2007	December 22, 2010
49	"A Desperate Rescue" (Do-or-Die Rescue Mission); Transliteration: "Kesshi no Kyūshutsu Sakusen" (Japanese: 決死の救出作戦)	December 8, 2007	December 23, 2010
50	"Who's the Next King?" (Who is the True Heir?); Transliteration: "Shinjitsu no Yotsugi wa Dare?" (Japanese: 真実の世継ぎは誰?)	December 15, 2007	December 27, 2010
51	"Battle of the Ak-Babas" (Decisive Battle, the Ak-Baba Army); Transliteration: "Kessen Akubaba Gundan" (Japanese: 決戦アクババ軍団)	December 22, 2007	December 28, 2010
52	"When the Seven Gems Shine" (When the Seven Gems Shine); Transliteration: "Nanatsu no Hōseki no Kagayaku Toki" (Japanese: 七つの宝石の輝く時)	December 29, 2007	December 29, 2010
53	"On an Adventurous Journey Again" (On an Adventurous Journey Again); Transliteration: "Futatabi Bouken no Tabi e" (Japanese: ふたたび冒険の旅へ)	January 5, 2008	TBA
54	"Jasmine Returns to the Forest" (Jasmine Returns to the Forest); Transliteration: "Jasumin Mori e Kaeru" (Japanese: ジャスミン森へ帰る)	January 12, 2008	TBA
55	"Trap of the Underground Labyrinth" (Trap of the Underground Labyrinth); Transliteration: "Chika Meikyū no Wana" (Japanese: 地下迷宮のワナ)	January 19, 2008	TBA
56	"Filli in a Big Pinch?" (Filli in a Big Pinch?); Transliteration: "Firi no Dai Pinchi?" (Japanese: フィリの大ピンチ?)	January 26, 2008	TBA
57	"The Solitary Guards" (The Solitary Guards); Transliteration: "Hitoribocchi no Kenpeidan" (Japanese: 独りぼっちの憲兵団)	February 2, 2008	TBA
58	"House-sitting at Tom's Shop" (House-sitting at Tom's Shop); Transliteration: "Tomu no Mise de o-Rusuban" (Japanese: トムの店でお留守番)	February 9, 2008	TBA
59	"Prin's First Love" (Prin's First Love); Transliteration: "Purin Hajimete no Koi" (Japanese: プリンはじめての恋)	February 16, 2008	TBA
60	"The Pirates of the River Tor" (The Pirates of the River Tor); Transliteration: "Torugawa no Tōzokutachi" (Japanese: トル川の盗賊たち)	February 23, 2008	TBA
61	"The Stolen Belt" (The Stolen Belt); Transliteration: "Ubawareta Beruto" (Japanese: 奪われたベルト)	March 1, 2008	TBA
62	"The Promise that Lief Kept" (The Promise that Lief Kept); Transliteration: "Rīfu no Mamotta Yakusoku" (Japanese: リーフの守った約束)	March 8, 2008	TBA
63	"Neridah and Jasmine" (Neridah and Jasmine); Transliteration: "Nerida to Jasumin" (Japanese: ネリダとジャスミン)	March 15, 2008	TBA
64	"The House Where Ols Lurk" (The House Where Ols Lurk); Transliteration: "Oru no Hisomu Yakata" (Japanese: オルのひそむ館)	March 22, 2008	TBA
65	"Deltora Forever" (Deltora Forever); Transliteration: "Derutora yo Eien ni" (Japanese: デルトラよ永遠に)	March 29, 2008	TBA

== Video game ==
A video game for the Nintendo DS titled Deltora Quest: Nanatsu no Houseki was released in Japan by Bandai Namco on September 20, 2007.
