= Lorraine Bayly =

Australian actress (1937–2026)

Lorraine Bayly AM
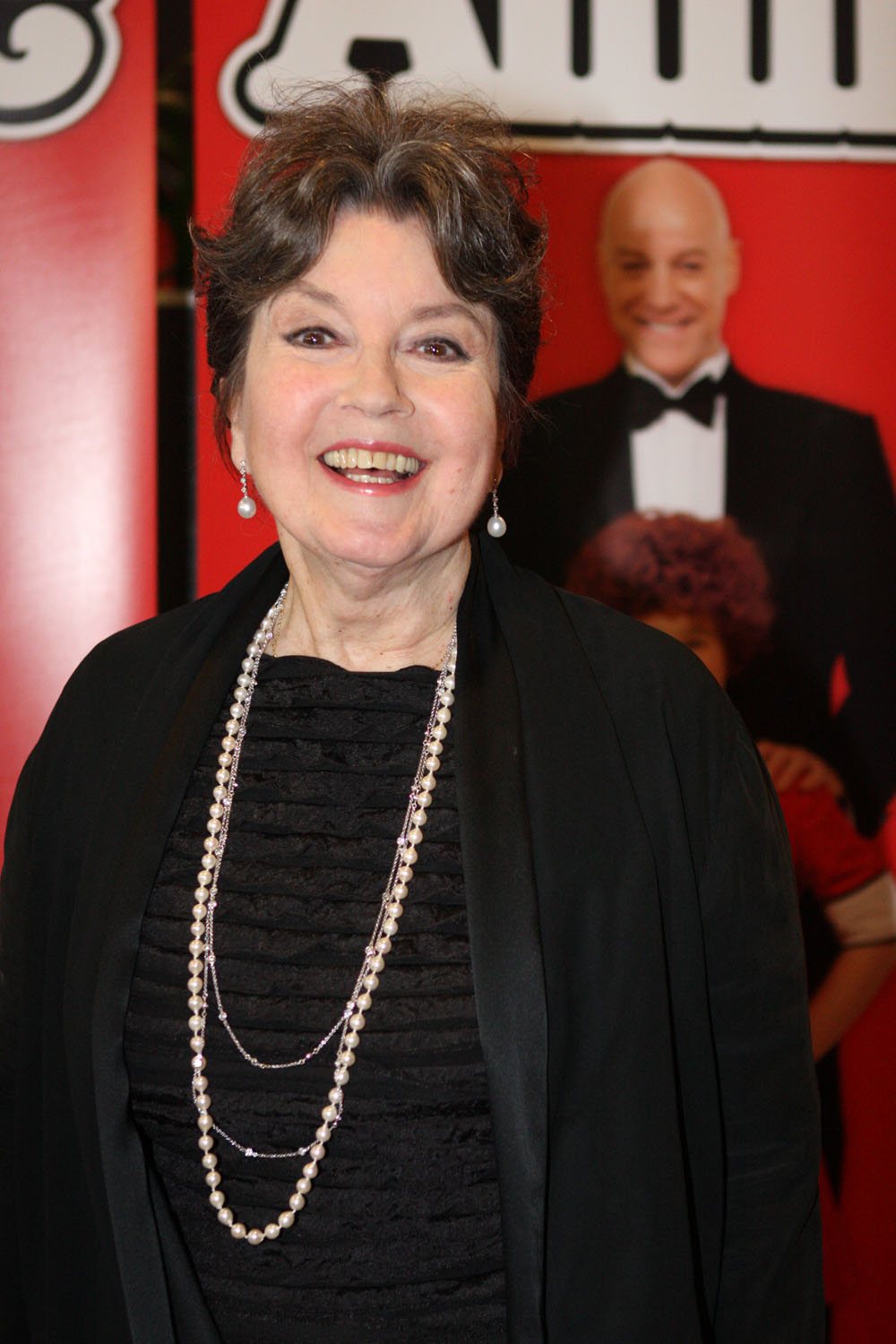
- Bayly in 2012 at the premiere of the musical Annie
- Born: Lorraine Daphne Bayly; 16 January 1937; Booligal, New South Wales, Australia
- Died: 28 February 2026 (aged 89); Sydney, New South Wales, Australia
- Occupations: Film television and theatre actress; presenter; pianist; singer; dancer; theatre founder; director; stage manager; writer
- Years active: 1954–2016
- Known for: The Man From Snowy River as Rosemary Hume; The Sullivans as Grace Sullivan; Carson's Law as Jennifer Carson; Neighbours as Faye Hudson; Play School as Presenter

Lorraine Daphne Bayly (16 January 1937 – 28 February 2026) was an Australian actress in film, television and theatre, narrator, puppeteer, presenter, singer, dancer, pianist, theatre director, stage manager and writer.

Bayly was a performer since she was a child, and became a professional actress in 1954, having started in theatre. She was perhaps best known to small-screen audiences for her roles in the drama The Sullivans as Grace Sullivan, the legal drama Carson's Law as Jennifer Carson and the soap opera Neighbours as Faye Hudson. She was well known also for children's series Play School, having been an original presenter from 1966 until 1978.

== Early life ==
Bayly was born in the western New South Wales Riverina town of Booligal on 16 January 1937, growing up alongside her sister June who was three-and-a-half years younger. Her first performance was at age 3, playing tambourine with the Salvation Army. The family moved south to Narrandera after her father, who worked for the police force, was transferred. Her father was also an amateur magician and ventriloquist. When Bayly was five, the family moved again, to Batemans Bay, 280 kilometres south of Sydney. From age five, she wrote, directed and starred in plays in the local jail.

At the age of six, Bayly's parents divorced and she went to live more than 180 km away in Batlow with her father, while her younger sister stayed with her mother in Batemans Bay. They were only able to see each other during the school holidays. From the age of nine, Bayly had her own ventriloquist act, which 35 years later she performed on The Parkinson Show, using host Michael Parkinson as her dummy.

At the age of 11, Bayly moved to Sydney with her father, where she "endured" two stepmothers. From age 11 to 12, she played live classical piano on Saturday afternoons on Radio 2UE. When Bayly left home, she worked in the ledger department of a bank in Sydney's Martin Place. In her late teens, she undertook free acting classes under Hayes Gordon for 18 months, while she helped convert a Kirribilli boatshed into a theatre, together with other students. This led to her becoming one of the founding members of Sydney's Ensemble Theatre, which she helped launch at the age of 21. Bayly's father was never able to see her acting, as he died several days before he was due to watch her perform in her first professional play, in 1958.

== Career ==
=== Theatre ===
Bayly performed in theatre since 1954. Her early performances for Ensemble Theatre included The Man (1958–1960), The Drunkard (1959), The Lonely Hearts (1960), The Buffalo Skinner (1961) and Fairytales of New York (1962), winning acclaim for her role in the latter. Further plays with Ensemble Theatre included The Rehearsal (1965) for which Bayly also won critical acclaim, as well as Invitation to a March (1967), The Rimers of Eldritch (1968), The Daughter-in-Law (1969), Come Laughing Home (1969), We Bombed in New Haven (1970), Three Months Gone (1970) and Who's Who (1974). Bayly also appeared in several plays for J. C. Williamson's including The Season at Sarsaparilla (1963), Mary, Mary (1963–1964), which also included a long tour of New Zealand, and Chase Me Comrade (1965).

While filming Play School, Bayly appeared on stage in D. H. Lawrence play The Daughter-in-Law for Ensemble Theatre in 1969. and would head home after the show to study the Play School script. Further J. C. Williamson's productions followed, with Who Killed Santa Claus? (1971), Suddenly at Home (1973), The Male of the Species (1975), opposite English actor Edward Woodward, and The Best Little Whorehouse in Texas (1980–1981), playing the role of Mona in the latter.

In 1991, Bayly performed in a touring production of Gas Light with Theatre of Comedy. She then played Mrs Patrick Campbell in Dear Liar (1992) and Margaret in a 1996 Ensemble Theatre staging of Rough Justice (1996). In 1997, she played the role of Linda Loman, opposite Max Cullen as Willy Loman, in Arthur Miller's Death of a Salesman at the Sydney Opera House, again for Ensemble Theatre. The staging won best production at the Sydney Critics Circle Awards.

Bayly took a hiatus from acting in 2003, after the closing night of a production of David Williamson's Birthrights at the Sydney Opera House. She returned to the stage during a 2007 production of Rabbit Hole with Ensemble Theatre.

In 2010, Bayly starred in the play Calendar Girls, a stage adaptation of the 2003 film of the same name, alongside an all-star cast including Rhonda Burchmore, Cornelia Frances and Jean Kittson. In 2012, she appeared in David Williamson's When Dad Married Fury. In 2015, Bayly featured in an Ensemble Theatre staging of John Misto's The Shoe-Horn Sonata, reprising her lead role as Sheila from an earlier performance back in 1997. The same year, Bayly played Frau Schmidt in a 2015 national tour of Rodgers and Hammerstein musical The Sound of Music, alongside Cameron Daddo as Captain Von Trapp and Marina Prior as Baroness Schraeder. The production, which marked the 50th anniversary of the film, was also Bayly's 50th stage show. Her other stage credits include Arthur Miller's The Last Yankee and David Williamson's Travelling North.

=== Television and film ===
Bayly's television debut was in 1960, performing comedy sketches as Leonard Teale's daughter on The Bobby Limb Show. Then, at the age of 20, she had a short-lived Sunday morning program (circa 1963), called Slim As You Clean with Lorraine Bayly.

Her other early credits included playing an air hostess in 1966 ABC series Be Our Guest alongside Jacki Weaver (which featured musical guests including the Bee Gees, Normie Rowe and Johnny Young) and the ABC sci-fi series The Interpretaris, in which she played astronaut Vera Balovna. This was followed by guest roles in Homicide, Division 4, Hunter, The Rovers and Spyforce. She also appeared in 1975's Disney TV movie Ride a Wild Pony. Bayly then landed an ongoing role on the long-running children's series Play School. She was one of the original presenters from 1966 to 1978, along with John Hamblin, John Waters and Anne Haddy.

In 1976, while appearing in the drama Case for the Defence and playing a guest role on soap opera Class of ‘74, Bayly was asked to audition for her best-known role as maternal figure Grace Sullivan in The Sullivans, a drama series set during the Second World War. She won the role, but had to relinquish her Sydney-based Play School presenter duties, in order to relocate to Melbourne. Actress Noni Hazlehurst took over her job when she left the show. Bayly was only in her 30s in 1976, when she began in the role of Grace, who was the mother of adult sons, so was styled to appear older.

Originally only signed for 13 weeks, Bayly left The Sullivans in 1979, after two-and-a-half years, wanting to return to theatre work, and as a result, her character was written out as the victim of a German V-1 flying bomb in London. By 1978, she had become the highest-paid series actress in the history of Australian television. After leaving The Sullivans, Bayly appeared in 1980 children's film Fatty Finn, 1982 Australian classic The Man From Snowy River, alongside Kirk Douglas and Sigrid Thornton and 1982 miniseries 1915.

From 1982 to 1984, Bayly played the lead role in another period television drama Carson's Law, as progressive lawyer Jennifer Carson, set in 1920s Melbourne. The episodes revolved around the cases taken on by Carson and the various personal intrigues of her family. The series also starred Kevin Miles as Jennifer's father-in-law Godfrey Carson and Gregg Caves, as Billy Carson. The series was written specifically for Bayly. Bayly next portrayed Alan Bond's wife Eileen, alongside John Wood and Nicholas Hammond in the 1986 miniseries The Challenge, based on Australia's win in America's Cup. She also appeared in 1989 murder mystery miniseries Grim Pickings, based on the novel by Jennifer Rowe, playing the role of Betsy Tander.

From 1991 to 1992, Bayly had a supporting role in long-running soap opera Neighbours as Faye Hudson. Faye was a 'busybody' who moved in with her brother Doug Willis (Terence Donovan) and his extended family. Having been told it would be a role similar to the character of Dynasty's Alexis Carrington, Bayly was disappointed when shortly into shooting, she discovered the role was quite different, and told producers she could no longer take on the role. Wanting her to stay, the producers allowed her to tweak the character and they adjusted some of the scripts accordingly. In 2004, Bayly played Lindy Chamberlain's mother Avis Murchison in 2004 miniseries Through My Eyes: The Lindy Chamberlain Story, alongside Miranda Otto, Peter O'Brien and Craig McLachlan. Bayly's additional television guest credits included A Country Practice, G.P. and Pizza.

=== Retirement ===
Bayly first retired from acting on the advice of her doctor on 2 August 2003, the closing night of a season of Birthrights, at the Sydney Opera House. Her blood pressure had become dangerously high and she was put on medication. Once it had regulated, she returned to acting, appearing in an Ensemble Theatre production of Rabbit Hole in 2007.

In 2016, in her 80s, Bayly once again retired from acting due to numerous other health issues.

== Personal life ==
Bayly's partner of 20 years was journalist Steve O'Baugh, Los Angeles bureau chief for News Limited. Originally from Tennessee, O'Baugh had moved to Australia in 1965. O'Baugh died from a heart attack related to kidney disease on 27 January 1996 at the age of 47, in Los Angeles. After his death, Bayly lived alone in Sydney's Neutral Bay.

Bayly was a skilled ventriloquist, and had studied hairdressing and make-up artistry. At 60, she learnt to play the saxophone, to performance standard. At 70, she took up tennis, qualifying for the 2009 World Masters Games within two years.

=== Illness and death ===
Bayly was diagnosed with pneumonia in 2018, leading to a partially collapsed lung. In 2019, shortly after her recovery, she was diagnosed with stage three breast cancer and subsequently underwent a right mastectomy as well as having five lymph nodes removed. When the COVID-19 pandemic hit, she then isolated in her one-bedroom Sydney apartment, for two-and-a-half years, to recuperate and due to being immunocompromised.

Bayly died at a care home in Sydney on 28 February 2026 at the age of 89.

== Honours, awards and nominations (selected) ==
Year	Association	Award	Work	Results	Ref.
1977	Sammy Awards	Best Lead Actress in a TV Series	The Sullivans as Grace Sullivan	Won	
1977	Logie Awards	Silver Logie Award for Most Popular Actress	The Sullivans as Grace Sullivan	Won	
1978	Logie Awards	Silver Logie Award for Most Popular Actress	The Sullivans as Grace Sullivan	Won	
1978	Sammy Awards	Best Lead Actress in a TV Series	The Sullivans as Grace Sullivan	Won	
1981	Australian Film Institute Awards	Best Performance by an Actress in a Leading Role	Fatty Finn	Nominated	
1983	Lions Club	Entertainer of the Year Award		Won	
1983	Logie Awards	Silver Logie Award for Most Popular Actress	Carson's Law as Jennifer Carson	Won	
1984	Penguin Awards	Sustained Performance by an Actress in a Series/Serial	Carson's Law as Jennifer Carson	Won	
2001	Australian Government	Member of the Order of Australia		Honoured	
2006	Australian Variety	Variety's 100 Entertainer of the Century	Lifetime honour	Honoured	

Bayly won numerous awards, including two Silver Logies in 1978 and 1979 for Most Popular Actress in The Sullivans.

Bayly was made a member of the Order of Australia by Queen Elizabeth II in the 2001 Australia Day Honours List. She was also named in Australian Variety's "100 Entertainers of the Century" in 2006.

Bayly was also honoured as the subject of an episode of This is Your Life in 1979.

When Bayly retired from acting, the restaurant at Sydney's Ensemble Theatre was named Bayly's Bistro in her honour.

== Filmography ==
=== Film ===
Year	Title	Role	Type	Ref.
1965	Birth of Jesus		Film short	
1967	Heaven Help Us		Film short	
1975	Ride a Wild Pony	Mrs. Ellison	Feature film	
1980	Fatty Finn	Maggie McGrath	Feature film	
1982	The Man From Snowy River	Rosemary Hume	Feature film	
2014	When the Queen Came to Town	Narrator	Documentary film	
2014	Locks of Love	Doris	Anthology film, segment: "To My One and Only"	

=== Television ===
Year	Title	Role	Type	Ref.
1960	The Bobby Limb Show		Regular role	
1963	Slim As You Clean with Lorraine Bayly	Presenter	13 episodes	
1965	Diary of a Plastic Surgeon		Teleplay	
1966	Be Our Guest	Lorraine, the air hostess		
1966	The Interpretaris	Vera Balovna	6 episodes	
1966–1978	Play School	Presenter	147 episodes	
1967	Owly's School	Presenter		
1967–1971	Homicide	Moira Simmons / Jennifer Tracy / Margaret Stevens / Audrey Shepherd	4 episodes	
1967	Divorce Court		1 episode	
1967; 1968	Hunter	Karen Savage / Sharon Reid / Diana Mannering	3 episodes	
1968	Play School in London	Regular presenter	48 episodes	
1969	Division 4	Jenny Noble / Linda Szabo	2 episodes	
1969	Riptide		1 episode	
1969	The Rovers	Virginia Shaw	1 episode	
1970	The Link Men		1 episode	
1971	Spyforce	Julia Carpenter	Episode: "The Bridge"	
1974	Silent Number	Jackson	1 episode	
1975	Number 96	Loueena Derwent	1 episode	
1976–1979; 1980	The Sullivans	Grace Sullivan	594 episodes	
1978	Case for the Defence	Sister Barrett	1 episode	
1982	1915	Helen Gilchrist	Miniseries, 4 episodes	
1982	Smithy's Friends		TV pilot	
1983–1984	Carson's Law	Jennifer Carson	184 episodes	
1986	The Challenge	Eileen Bond	Miniseries, 6 episodes	
1988	The Pandas: China's Living Treasures	Narrator	Documentary	
1988; 1990	Rafferty's Rules	Gwen Forster / Audrey Shepherd	2 episodes	
1989	A Country Practice	Jean Richmond	2 episodes	
1989	Grim Pickings	Betsy Tender	Miniseries, 2 episodes	
1989	Home Brew	Edna Eustace	TV movie	
1991–1992	Neighbours	Faye Hudson	48 episodes	
1992	The Adventures of Snugglepot, Cuddlepie and Ragged Blossom	Narrator	TV special	
1995	Toddlers and their Thinking	Narrator	Documentary	
1995	G.P.	Pat Stoppard	1 episode	
2001	Pizza	The Fairy	1 episode	
2004	Through My Eyes: The Lindy Chamberlain Story	Avis Murchison	Miniseries, 2 episodes	
2015	The Jewel of the Mountain	Narrator	Documentary	

=== TVC ===
Year	Advertisement	Product	Ref.
1961	Brylcreem	Hair product	
1965	Bushells	Tea	
1989	Shape	Milk	
1989	Foster Parents Plan		
1993	Optus	Telecommunications company	

== Stage ==
Year	Production	Role	Venue / company	Ref.
1954	The Desert Song		Rockdale Town Hall with Australian Light Opera Company	
1958	Variations on Similar Themes		Cammeray Children's Library, Theatre Institute, Sydney with Ensemble Theatre, Sydney	
1958–1960	The Man	Ruth	Theatre Institute, Sydney, Ensemble Theatre, Sydney	
1959	The Drunkard	The Child	Ensemble Theatre, Sydney	
1960	Miss Lonelyhearts	Lead role	Ensemble Theatre, Sydney	
1961	The Buffalo Skinner	The Mother	Ensemble Theatre, Sydney	
1962	Fairytales of New York	All female roles	Ensemble Theatre, Sydney	
1963	The Season at Sarsaparilla	Judy Pogson	Theatre Royal, Sydney with J. C. Williamson's / Elizabethan Theatre Trust	
1963	The Tiger / The Typists	Stage manager	Ensemble Theatre, Sydney	
1963–1964	Mary, Mary	Tiffany Richards	Comedy Theatre, Melbourne, Theatre Royal Sydney, Her Majesty's Theatre, Adelaide & New Zealand tour with J. C. Williamson's	
1964	The Rehearsal	Lead role	Ensemble Theatre, Sydney	
1964	Cages: Snow Angel / Epiphany	Stage manager	Ensemble Theatre, Sydney	
1965	Invitation to a March		Ensemble Theatre, Sydney	
1965	Chase Me Comrade	Nancy Rimmington	Her Majesty's Theatre, Adelaide, Comedy Theatre, Melbourne, Theatre Royal Sydney with J. C. Williamson's	
1966	The Shadow of a Gunman		Ensemble Theatre, Sydney	
1968	The Rimers of Eldritch		Ensemble Theatre, Sydney	
1968–1969	An Enemy of the People		Ensemble Theatre, Sydney	
1969	The Daughter-in-Law	Lead role	Ensemble Theatre, Sydney	
1969	Come Laughing Home	Lead role	Ensemble Theatre, Sydney	
1970	We Bombed in New Haven	Lead role	Monash University, Playhouse, Canberra with Ensemble Theatre, Sydney	
1970	Three Months Gone	Anna	Ensemble Theatre, Sydney	
1971	Who Killed Santa Claus?		Phillip Theatre, Sydney with J. C. Williamson's	
1973	Suddenly at Home	Sheila Wallis	Comedy Theatre Melbourne with J. C. Williamson's	
1973	Queen of the Rebels	Lead role	Marian St Theatre, Sydney	
1974	Who's Who	Lead role	Ensemble Theatre, Sydney, Theatre 62, Adelaide	
1975	The Male of the Species		Comedy Theatre, Melbourne, Elizabethan Theatre, Sydney, Her Majesty's Theatre, Adelaide with J. C. Williamson's	
1976	Status Quo Vadis	Mrs Elgin	Ensemble Theatre, Sydney	
1980–1981	The Best Little Whorehouse in Texas	Mona Stangley	Her Majesty's Theatre, Melbourne with Cooke Hayden Price	
1984–1985	Play Memory		Ensemble Theatre, Sydney	
1985	Same Time, Next Year	Doris	Ensemble Theatre, Sydney	
1987	The Gingerbread Lady	Evy Meara	Universal Theatre Theatre Royal, Hobart, Ensemble Theatre	
1989–1990	Lipstick Dreams		Belvoir St Theatre, Sydney, Monash University, Melbourne, Twelfth Night Theatre, Brisbane	
1991	Another Time	Belle	Marian St Theatre, Sydney	
1991	Gaslight	Mrs Manningham	Australian tour with Theatre of Comedy	
1992	Dear Liar	Mrs Patrick Campbell	Monash University, Geelong Arts Centre with Malcolm C Cooke & Associates	
1994	Mixed Emotions		Ensemble Theatre, Sydney	
1995	The Last Yankee		Ensemble Theatre, Sydney	
1996	Rough Justice	Prosecutor Margaret Casely	Ensemble Theatre, Sydney	
1997	Death of a Salesman	Linda Loman	Sydney Opera House with Ensemble Theatre, Sydney	
1998	Blinded by the Sun		Sydney Opera House with Ensemble Theatre, Sydney	
1999	The Shoe-Horn Sonata	Sheila	Sydney Opera House with Ensemble Theatre, Sydney	
2000	Travelling North		University of Sydney with Ensemble Theatre, Sydney	
2001	The Oldest Profession	Vera	Ensemble Theatre, Sydney	
2001	The Chalk Garden		Glen St Theatre, Sydney with The Actors' Forum	
2002	Brighton Beach Memoirs		Sydney with The Actors' Forum	
2003	Birthrights	Margaret	Melbourne Theatre Company, Sydney Opera House, Ensemble Theatre, Sydney	
2007	Rabbit Hole	Nat	Ensemble Theatre, Sydney, Playhouse, Canberra	
2010	Calendar Girls	Jessie	Lyric Theatre, Brisbane Ensemble Theatre, Sydney, Comedy Theatre, Melbourne	
2012	When Dad Married Fury	Judy	Ensemble Theatre, Sydney, Theatre Royal, Sydney	
2015	The Shoe-Horn Sonata	Sheila	Ensemble Theatre, Sydney	
2015–2016	The Sound of Music	Frau Schmidt	Australian national tour	
