= Memphis LK =

Australian record producer (born 1993)

- Born: Memphis Lillian Fairfax Kelly; 2 October 1993 (age 33); Melbourne, Australia
- Genres: Electronic, dance pop
- Occupations: Musician, record producer
- Years active: 2010–present
- Label: Independent
- Formerly of: Wishful
- Partner: Allday
Memphis LK
- Parents: Paul Kelly (father); Kaarin Fairfax (mother)
- Relatives: Dan Kelly (cousin)

Memphis Lillian Fairfax Kelly (born 2 October 1993), known professionally as Memphis LK, is an Australian singer, songwriter, record producer and DJ. She is the daughter of Australian actress Kaarin Fairfax and musician Paul Kelly. Memphis has played at festivals, Splendour in the Grass, Party in the Paddock, Beyond the Valley, Listen Out, Pitch Festival, Great Escape Festival and Way Out West. She is currently independent.

== Early life ==
Memphis Lillian Fairfax Kelly was born on 2 October 1993, in Melbourne. She is the younger daughter of Australian actress Kaarin Fairfax and musician Paul Kelly. Originally she wanted to be a marine biologist or an astronaut growing up. She began making music with her older sister, Madeleine "Maddy" Kelly, as a child. After her parents separated in 2001, Memphis and her sister stayed with their mother, but their father maintained contact with his daughters. The sisters have sung and danced together since childhood, where they charge their relatives 50c for a performance.(at 1:25)

== Career ==
Memphis, as a seven-year-old, starred alongside her parents in the Rachel Perkins short film One Night the Moon (2001) for which her father composed the score. Filming took place in the Flinders Ranges, over six weeks in early 2000 and includes a Memphis and Fairfax duet on the title track, "One Night the Moon". In 2010, Memphis and her sister formed a pop indie trio, Wishful, with Sam Humphrey on guitar, whom they had met at Queenscliff Music Festival.(at 3:04) They were later joined by Harley Hamer and Caleb Williams.(at 10:52) In March 2014, Wishful performed at the Port Fairy Folk Festival. Around age 20 Memphis had learned to use music software Ableton, which allowed her to produce her own music independently. By 2015 she was providing backing vocals for her cousin Dan Kelly in Dan Kelly's Dream Band,(at 3:04) alongside Dave Williams and Kiernan Box (of Augie March), Indra Adams (Ground Components) and Ryan Nelson (SubAudible Hum). The pair have also provided backing vocals for C. W. Stoneking.(at 3:04) In 2015 the sisters recorded "StalkHer" as the theme song for feature film, StalkHer, which co-stars and is co-directed by their mother with John Jarratt.

In 2016 Memphis formed a briefly existing electro-pop duo, Saatsuma, with producer, César Rodrigues, to release four tracks, "Storm", "Floating", "Isolate" and "Stay". Saatsuma issued an album, Overflow, in September 2017 and, for live performances, the duo were joined by three additional musicians, Maddy Kelly, Lachlan Stuckey and Andrew Congues. The album was co-written and co-produced by Memphis and Rodrigues and mixed by Dream Kit (Declan Kelly - Memphis' half-brother). Alex Watts, writing for The Beat, described his favourite track, "Without U Again" as "gorgeously atmospheric song with a mournful melody, [Memphis'] unadorned delivery juxtaposed with pitched and effected backing vocals and a production that continues to build. At the three-minute mark the vocal begins to fade away and the snare clap that had been anchoring the song is replaced by the distant thud of an insistent kick drum. As the synths whirl around the stereo field, their pitch and pulse rising in intensity, eventually a chunky dance beat kicks in. At nearly nine minutes it’s an incredibly euphoric endorphin release that caps off an album that focuses on human emotions amongst electronic sounds."

Since 2020, Memphis has pursued a solo career under the moniker, Memphis LK. She has mentioned her sound is influenced by electronic music artists like Grimes, DJ Sammy, and Kaskade, as well as genres such as Trance, Eurodance, Pop and Techno. She has been previously nominated for AIR Awards and Music Victoria Awards.

== Personal life ==
Memphis is in a relationship with Australian rapper Allday (Tomas Henry Gaynor), their first child was born in 2026. Memphis has co-written tracks with Gaynor.

== Discography ==
=== Extended plays ===
- 1 (2021)
- Too Much Fun (2023)
- True Love and Its Consequences (2023)
- Say (2024)

=== Singles ===
- "Thinkin Of U" x Mona Yim (2023)
- "Say" (2024)
- "Just The Way You Are" (2024)
- "Don't Touch Me Baby" x DJ Boring (2024)
- "Skyflower" (2025)
- "No Tomorrow" x DJ Heartstring, SWIM (2025)
- "Fixated" x LB AKA Labat (2025)
- "That Boy's Not Nice" (2025)
- "Some Kinda Heaven" (2026)
- "Out My Body" (2026)
