= Cheree Cassidy =

Australian actress

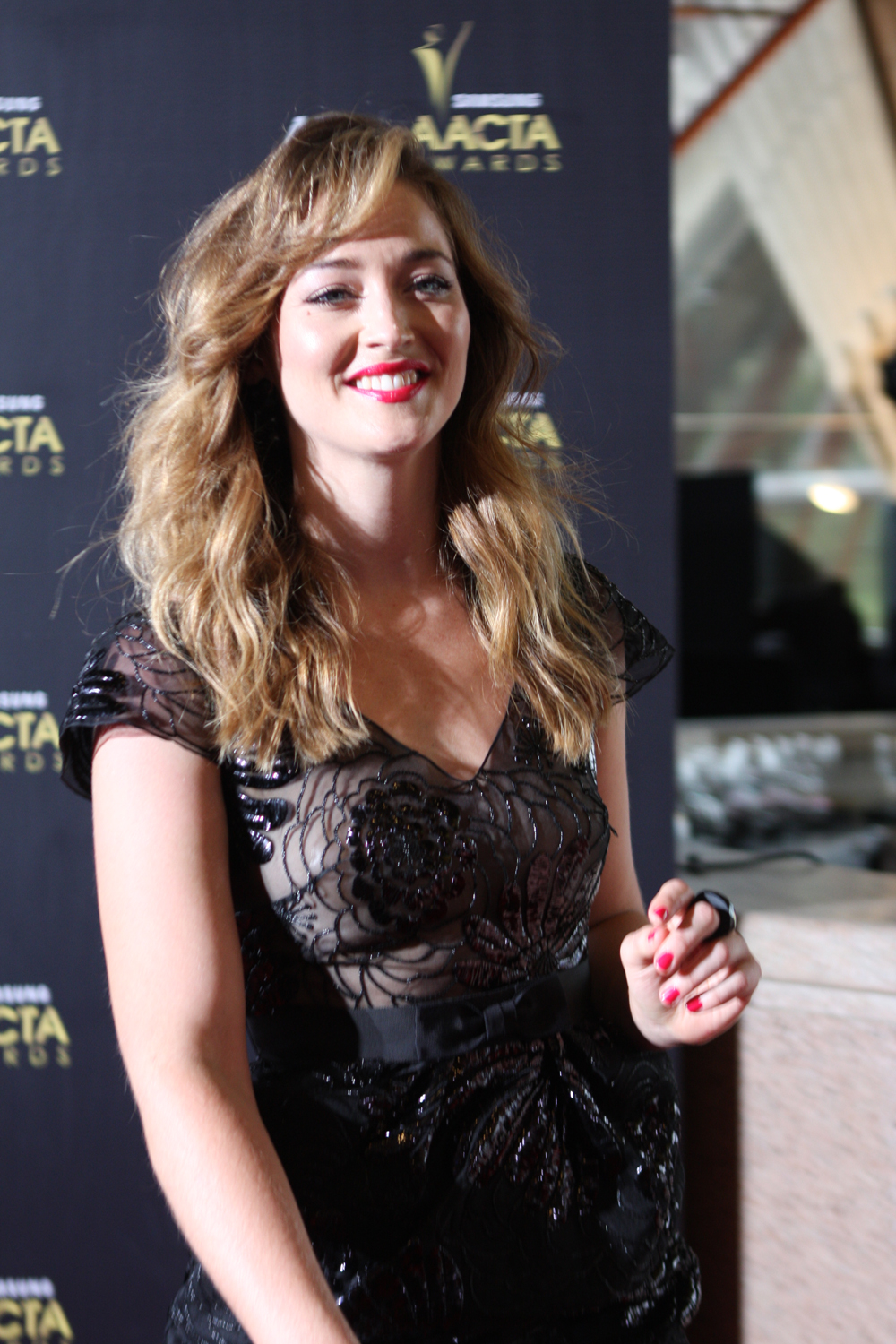
- Cassidy in 2012
- Occupation: Actress
- Notable work: Underbelly: The Golden Mile

Cheree Cassidy is an Australian actress. For her performance in the Nine Network crime drama Underbelly: The Golden Mile (2010), she was nominated for the AFI Award For Best Lead Actress In A Television Drama.

This was followed by roles in the ABC series Paper Giants: The Birth of Cleo (2011) and The Time of Our Lives (2013–2014), and the soap opera Home and Away (2016–2017).

Stage performances include When Dad Married Fury at the Ensemble Theatre in 2012, The Boys at the Griffin Theatre and touring with the Black Swan's adaptation of Cat on a Hot Tin Roof.

In 2023, Cassidy would appear in Ten Pound Poms and would reprise her role for series two.

== Filmography ==
=== Television appearances ===
Year	Title	Role	Notes
2023	Bump	Lucinda	1 episodes
2023	Erotic Stories	Fiona	1 episodes
2023	Wolf Like Me	Kat	2 episodes
2023-present	Ten Pound Poms	Marelene Chase	6 episodes
2021	Eden	Newsreader (voice)	2 episodes
2019	Total Control	Journo	2 episodes
2019	The House	Tara	1 episodes
2016-17	Home and Away	Samantha Webster	14 episodes
2016	Janet King	Susie Nobakht	6 episodes
2015	Australia: The Story of Us	Alicia Kelly	1 episodes
2013-14	The Time of Our Lives	Alice	12 episodes
2011	Paper Giants: The Birth of Cleo	Ivana Holbrook	2 episodes
2010	Underbelly	Debbie Webb	10 episodes
2009	Packed to the Rafters	Janince	1 episodes

=== Film appearances ===
Year	Title	Role	Notes
2025	Anaconda	Donna	Makeup Artist
2019	Zombie Tidal Wave	Kenzie Wright	
2015	Going Down		Short
2015	Three Kings	Dancing Woman	Short
2015	Talk to Someone	Jen	Short
2015	Manny Lewis	Jacinta	
2014	A Man on the Edge	Amy Western	Short
2009	The Peril of Milton Wintry	Putt Putt Girl	Short
2008	Pip's First Time		Short

== Stage ==
- Cat on a Hot Tin Roof (2011) as Maggie (national tour)
- The Boys (2012) as Michelle (Griffin Theatre)
- When Dad Married Fury (2012) as Fury (Ensemble Theatre)

== Early life ==
Cassidy grew up in Sydney. After taking short courses at the Australian Film, Television and Radio School and New York's Neighborhood Playhouse School of the Theatre, Cassidy moved to Perth to study at the Western Australian Academy of Performing Arts, graduating in 2008. She also trained in dance at Brent Street.
