= Kaarin Fairfax =

Australian actress, director and singer

- Born: Kaarin Louise Fairfax; 30 September 1959 (age 67); Melbourne, Victoria, Australia
- Other name: Mary-Jo Starr
- Occupations: Actress; director; singer; theatre founder
- Years active: 1980–present
- Spouse: Paul Kelly (1993–2001)
- Children: 2
- Website: kaarinfairfax.com.au

Kaarin Louise Fairfax (born 30 September 1959) is an Australian actress, director and singer who played the role of Dolour Darcy in two TV miniseries, The Harp in the South (1986) and its sequel Poor Man's Orange (1987), based on books of the same names by Ruth Park.

== Early life ==
Fairfax grew up in the theatre, with her father, George Fairfax acting in and directing shows at Melbourne's Little Theatre (now known as St Martins Youth Theatre), during which time she developed a passion for acting and the arts.

== Career ==
=== Acting ===
Fairfax acted in several Australian television series throughout the 1980s, 1990s and 2000s.

She appeared in the Australian sitcom Col'n Carpenter, a spin-off from The Comedy Company, after Vikki Blanche left the series. She starred in the Rachel Perkins 2001 short film One Night the Moon alongside her husband at the time, Paul Kelly – a story of racial prejudice in the outback. She also played the role of Deb Mathieson on Australian Broadcasting Corporation TV series, Bed of Roses (2008, 2010).

Fairfax has worked as both actor and director in Australian theatre. By 2008, Fairfax had established The Little Theatre Company in Frankston, Victoria, in honour of her father George Fairfax. Fairfax directed the musical Frankston Lights in January 2009, which included songs co-written by her children (Madeleine and Memphis) and Robert McHugh. Kaarin has been working extensively since that time, joining forces with Sally Baillieu and directing The Wetlands Project, One Last Chance, performed in the Wetlands at Tootgarook. In January 2012 she directed Good People for Red Stitch Actors Theatre.

In 2015, Fairfax co-starred in the film StalkHer alongside John Jarratt.

=== Music ===
Fairfax was a vocalist for Wild Blue Yonder, a Sydney-based band from 1985 which had a varied line-up but had no known recordings. In the late 1970s she was part of a comedy vocal trio The Droolettes which also included Gina Riley and Gina Mendoza, with Geoff O'Connell on piano. During 1989–1991 she supplied backing vocals on tracks by Paul Kelly & the Messengers.

In 1990, under the name, Mary-Jo Starr, she released three singles and an album, Too Many Movies. She was nominated for the 1991 ARIA Award for Best New Talent and appeared on the Breaking Ground - New Directions in Country Music compilation which was also nominated for Best Country Album. She joined Truckasaurus in 1993, a Melbourne-based Grungey/country band which released Truckasaurus in October.

Together with Sally Baillieu, Fairfax runs The Lineup at Frankston Arts Centre Cube37, a musical mentorship program for young emerging artists. Madeleine and Memphis, together with band member Sam Humphrey, record under the band name Wishful. Their first EP, Fifty Days was produced by their father Paul Kelly. Fairfax and Baillieu also have an arts program on 3RPP Radio Port Phillip on the Mornington Peninsula, called Arts About.

== Personal life ==
Fairfax is the former wife of Australian musician Paul Kelly—they met in 1988. Their two children are Madeleine (born 1991) and Memphis (born 1993). Memphis appeared with her parents in short film, One Night the Moon. The couple separated not long after the film's release.

== Filmography ==
=== Film ===
Year	Title	Role	Type
1982	Starstruck	Icecream Girl	Feature film
1983	A Descant for Gossips	Vinny Lalor	TV movie
1987	Around the World in Eighty Ways	Checkout Chick	Feature film
1987	Damsels Be Damned	Michelle	Short film
1988	Belinda	Sandra	Feature film
1988	Young Einstein	The Brunette	Feature film
1988	A Crack in the Curtains	Sarah	Short film
1989	Shadow Panic	The Hothead	Short film
1990	Worse than Xmas	Angela	Short film
2001	One Night the Moon	Rose Ryan	Short film
2015	Holding the Man	Wedding Singer	Feature film
2015	StalkHer	Emily	Feature film
2017	Pillars	Rosetta	Short film
2017	What if it Works?	Dr. Karen Di Scala	Feature film
2017	West of Sunshine	Andrea	Feature film
2017	Deep Six	Bonnie	Short film
2018	The Resurgence	Melanie	Short film
2018	Just Between Us	Meryl	Feature film
2018	In the Wake	Sue	Short film
2018	The Greta Fragments	Mary	Short film
2018	Skewwhiff	Rae	Short film
2019	The Hunt	Nell	Short film
2019	The Diver	Dorothy	Short film
2019	Bloom	Aunty Vera	Short film
2020	The Green Door	Lady in Church	Feature film
2020	Paper Champions	Morine	Feature film
2020	Hakuumacaato	Marion (voice)	Short film
2023	What About Sal?	Sophie	Feature film

=== Television ===
Year	Title	Role	Type
1980	The Last Outlaw	Grace	TV miniseries, 4 episodes
1981-84	Cop Shop	Joan Wyndham/ Mary Palmer	TV series, 3 episodes
1981	I Can Jump Puddles	Rene	TV miniseries, 1 episode
1982	Sons and Daughters	Schoolgirl	TV series, 1 episodes
1982	Prisoner	Kathy Hudson	TV series, 2 episodes
1983	Home		TV series, 3 episodes
1983	The Sullivans	Mona	TV series, 1 episodes
1984	Carson's Law	Agnes Knight	TV series, 1 episode
1984	The Mike Walsh Show	Guest - Herself	TV series, 1 episode
1986	The Harp in the South	Dolour Darcy	TV miniseries, 3 episodes
1987	Poor Man's Orange	Dolour Darcy	TV miniseries, 2 episodes
1990	Catalyst	Presenter	TV series
1990-91	Col'n Carpenter	Linda Williams	TV series, 26 episodes
1992	Tuesday Night Live: The Big Gig	Mary-Jo Starr	TV series, 1 episode
1995	Correlli	Terri	TV miniseries, 1 episode
2000	SeaChange	Suzy	TV series, 1 episode
2003	Kath & Kim	Nurse	TV series, 1 episode
2004	Fergus McPhail	Ms. Rolla	TV series, 4 episodes
2009	Rush	Janey Merryn	TV series, 1 episode
2010	Offspring	Florist	TV series, 1 episode
2008-11	Bed of Roses	Deb Mathieson	TV series, 26 episodes
2012-13	You're Skitting Me	Additional cast	TV series, 26 episodes
2017	Method	Gina Delaware	TV series, 1 episode
2018	Picnic at Hanging Rock	Cook	TV miniseries, 4 episodes
2019	Internment	Janet	TV series, 3 episodes
2022	Darby and Joan	Heidi	TV series, 1 episode

=== As crew ===
Year	Title	Role	Type
1993	Say a Little Prayer	Drama Coach	Feature film
2015	StalkHer	Co-director	Feature film
2018	The Greta Fragments	Writer	Short film

== Stage ==
=== Actor ===
Year	Title	Role	Type
1979	The Woman	Astyanax / Gemil	Pram Factory, Melbourne with APG
	Zig Zag Follies	Lead	Adelaide Festival
	Quick Ease Cafe	Comedy Lead	
1980	Slipped Disco	Cigs	Flying Trapeze Cafe, Melbourne
1980–1981	Cain's Hand	Kathy (Lead girl)	Scott Theatre, Adelaide & St Martins Youth Centre, Melbourne with Nimrod Theatre Company
1983	Summer of the Seventeenth Doll	Bubba	Anthill Theatre, Melbourne with Australian Nouveau Theatre
1984	Beach Blanket Tempest	Gidget	North Qld tour, Araluen Arts Centre, Playhouse, Adelaide, Canberra Theatre & University of Sydney with New Moon Theatre Company
1984	The Kid	Snake	St Martins Youth Centre, Melbourne with Playbox Theatre Company
1984	Top Girls	Shona / Kit	Russell St Theatre, Melbourne with MTC
1985	The Doll Trilogy	Bubba	Sydney Opera House, Melbourne Athenaeum with STC / MTC
1986	No Worries	Ensemble	Wharf Theatre, Sydney with STC
1987	A Lie of the Mind	Beth	Belvoir St Theatre, Sydney
1987	Shakers		Belvoir St Theatre, Sydney
1988	Darlinghurst Nights	Gunman's Girl	Wharf Theatre, Sydney, ANU, Canberra with STC
1988	King Lear	Cordelia	Playhouse, Adelaide with STCSA
1988–1990	The Glass Menagerie	Laura	Playhouse, Adelaide & Marian St Theatre, Sydney with STCSA
1989	Speed-the-Plow	Karen	Sydney Opera House, Russell St Theatre, Melbourne with MTC
1990	Beach Blanket Tempest	Gidget	Q Theatre, Penrith
1994	The Swan	Dora	Space Theatre, Adelaide with STCSA
1995	Haxby's Circus	Gina	Playhouse, Adelaide with STCSA
1996	Miss Bosnia	Selma	Fairfax Studio, Melbourne, West Gippsland Arts Centre, Monash University, Canberra Theatre, Bendigo Performing Arts Centre, Geelong Arts Centre, Gold Coast Arts Centre with MTC
1999	Into the Woods	Lucinda (Stepsister)	Playhouse, Melbourne with MTC
2017	Next Fall	Arlene	Chapel off Chapel, Melbourne

=== Director ===
Year	Title	Role	Type
	Go Away Mr. Worrythoughts		Frankston Arts Centre & Australian regional tour
1992	Funerals and Circuses	Director, Assistant	Theatre 62, Universal Theatre, Melbourne, Playhouse, Canberra
1993	Tall Tales and True	Director	South Australia tour with Magpie Theatre Company
1994	Planet K	Director	Continental Cafe, Melbourne
1994	All of Me	Director	Belvoir St Theatre, Sydney & Melbourne Town Hall for Melbourne International Comedy Festival
1997	Patsy Cline: Her Songs, Her Story	Director	Universal Theatre, Melbourne
1998–2002	Mum's the Word	Director	Glen St Theatre, Sydney with Bendigo Performing Arts Centre, Fairfax Studio, Melbourne, Melbourne Athenaeum for Melbourne International Comedy Festival
1999	Popcorn	Director	Picture This Productions
2001	It's a Dad Thing	Director	Melbourne Athenaeum
2001	Always ... Patsy Cline	Director	Darwin Entertainment Centre with Majestic Theatre Company
2002	Uncle Bob	Director	Red Stitch Actors Theatre
2002	The Play About the Baby	Director	Red Stitch Actors Theatre
2003	The War Against Short Trousers	Director	Chapel Off Chapel, Melbourne
2003	Push Up	Director	Red Stitch Actors Theatre
2008	Mum's the Word 2: Teenagers	Director	Theatre Royal, Sydney, Comedy Theatre, Melbourne
2009	Frankston Lights	Director	The Little Theatre Company
2010	Fairweather Island	Directorial consultant	Carlton Courthouse, Melbourne with La Mama
2011	The Wetlands Project: One Last Chance	Director	Tootgarook Wetlands with Dreamhouse Theatre Company, Frankston Arts Centre Cube37 & 3940 Arts
2012	Good People	Director	Red Stitch Actors Theatre
2012	Almost with You	Director	La Mama, Melbourne & Cube37 FAC
2018	Chemistry	Producer	Alex Theatre, Melbourne with The Little Theatre Company

== Discography ==
=== Albums ===
Year	Title	Artist	Details
1990	Too Many Movies	Mary-Jo Starr	Label: Mushroom Records (D30224); Format: Vinyl, CD

=== Singles ===
Year	Title	Artist	Album
1989	"Kissing in a Taxi"	Mary-Jo Starr	Too Many Movies
1990	"Passionate Kisses"	Mary-Jo Starr	Too Many Movies
1990	"Lonesome, Lovely & Alone"	Mary-Jo Starr	non album single
1989	"Killer in Me"		StalkHer film soundtrack

== Awards & nominations ==
=== Film & TV ===
Year	Nominee / work	Award	Result	Ref.
1987	Belinda	AFI Award for Best Actress in a Supporting Role	Nominated	
1988	Poor Man's Orange	AFI Award for Best Performance by an Actress in a Miniseries	Nominated	
2002	Uncle Bob	Green Room Award for Outstanding Direction	Won	
2011	Bed of Roses	Ensemble Award for Outstanding Performance by an Ensemble Series in a Drama Series	Nominated	
2012	Bed of Roses	Ensemble Award for Outstanding Performance by an Ensemble Series in a Drama Series	Nominated	
2018	The Greta Fragments	Top Indie Film Award for Best Writing	Nominated	

=== Music ===
Year	Nominee / work	Award	Result	Ref.
1991	Too Many Movies	ARIA Award for Best New Talent	Nominated	
