= Be Our Guest (disambiguation) =

"Be Our Guest" is a song from the 1991 animated film Beauty and the Beast.

Be Our Guest may also refer to:

- "Be Our Guest" (American Horror Story), an episode of the television series American Horror Story
- Be Our Guest (TV series), a 1966 Australian series
- Be Our Guest Restaurant, at Walt Disney World Resort
