= Vikki Blanche =

Australian actress and director

- Born: 1966 or 1967 (age 58–59); Australia
- Occupations: Actress, director
- Years active: 1983–present

Vikki Blanche (born 1966 or 1967) is an Australian actress and director. She made her television debut in the children's series Home in 1983, followed by a role in the ABC drama The Keepers. Shortly after graduating from the National Theatre in late 1984, Blanche was cast as Julie Robinson in the soap opera Neighbours, which began airing in March 1985. After seven months she decided to leave the serial so she would not be typecast in the future. Blanche joined the cast of The Flying Doctors as Paula Patterson in 1988. She also appeared in the sitcom Col'n Carpenter and the 1991 miniseries Rose Against the Odds. Blanche then spent 18 months living and studying acting in New York City. Upon her return to Australia, she was cast as Senior Detective Chris Faithful in the second season of the ABC police drama Phoenix. After an appearance in the 1997 feature film Road to Nhill, Blanche wrote and directed The Other Days of Ruby Rae, which earned her a nomination for Best Screenplay in a Short Film at the 2000 AFI Awards. Blanche has since gone on to direct television commercials.

== Early life ==
Blanche has a brother. She became interested in acting when she was eight years old, after she joined the National Theatre workshops. She attended Kingswood College in Box Hill.

== Career ==
Blanche made her television debut in the 1983 ABC children's series Home. Blanche played Billie, who she said "knew what she wanted and what she believed in and was good at organising what the others should do." The following year, she appeared alongside Bill Hunter and David Cameron in the nine-part ABC drama series The Keepers. The show focuses on the lives of Fisheries and Wildlife officers in a small community. Blanche plays Kim, the daughter of Aggie French (Catherine Wilkin). She also had a six week guest stint as a doctor's daughter in The Young Doctors. Blanche graduated from the National Theatre in November 1984.

Blanche's breakthrough role was that of Julie Robinson in the soap opera Neighbours. Blanche admitted to not taking the audition seriously, as she had only just graduated from school and did not think she would win the role. She was cast in December 1984, started filming in January 1985, and made her debut in the first episode on 18 March 1985. Margaret Koppe of TV Radio Extra described Blanche's character as complex. Julie appears to be helpful and caring, but she often interferes and schemes. Marie McNamara of The Age praised Blanche for her performance, while a reporter for the Aberdeen Press and Journal said she made Julie "one of the most popular characters in the Australian soap." Blanche had a relationship with her co-star David Clencie during her time in the serial, and the couple lived together for six months. After seven months of playing Julie, Blanche chose to leave Neighbours before the end of her contract. She admitted that she did not want to stay in the same role for a long time and end up typecast. When the character was reintroduced in 1992, the role was recast to Julie Mullins.

Following her departure from Neighbours, Blanche worked at the St Martin's Theatre in Melbourne and had a guest role in an episode of The Flying Doctors. In 1988, she re-joined the main cast of The Flying Doctors as radiographer Paula Patterson, the younger sister of pilot Sam, played by Blanche's former Neighbours co-star Peter O'Brien. While appearing on The Flying Doctors, Blanche also worked at the Cadillac Bar in Melbourne. Alongside her Flying Doctors co-star Liz Burch and singer Neil Finn, Blanche appeared in Nine Network's A Chance for the Children programme in 1990, which highlighted the need for water, health care and education in third world countries. Following a number of changes to the format of the show, Blanche was written out of The Flying Doctors to make way for new actors. Blanche admitted that while she would have stayed on with the show, her character had very few storylines in the last six months, and she questioned whether she was learning anything new.

After leaving The Flying Doctors, Blanche starred as Julia in the Network Ten sitcom Col'n Carpenter. She was contracted for 26 weeks, and she liked that she got to have a say in how her character developed. As Col'n Carpenter was the first comedy Blanche had worked on, she had to learn new acting skills, and she felt that she picked up a lot from her co-stars Kim Gyngell and Monica Maughan. Blanche quit Col'n Carpenter after a year. She told David Brown of TV Week that she had learned a lot, but she wanted to move on and challenge herself. She planned to go to London, England for three months for work and travel, before going to New York City.

While appearing in Col'n Carpenter, Blanche also filmed a role as Jenny Rose in the 1991 miniseries Rose Against the Odds, which tells the story of Aboriginal boxer Lionel Rose. Blanche met with the real Jenny Rose to talk about her life and relationship with Lionel to prepare for the role. Blanche later felt that working on both productions simultaneously made her lose respect for her job because of the scheduling, so she decided to go overseas to study acting in order to stay challenged. She spent 18 months living and working in New York City. She studied acting at the HB Studio and the Neighborhood Playhouse School of the Theatre, and chose not to attend auditions or seek roles. She worked as a waitress in order to pay her rent.

A few weeks after returning to Melbourne, Blanche auditioned for the second season of the ABC police drama Phoenix. Blanche had not watched the series before she was offered the role of Senior Detective Chris Faithful, who is married to Peter Faithful (Simon Westaway) and goes undercover for the drug squad. Blanche described her character as having a "gift for the job. She's tough, in that she is mixing with crooks, but I don't think she's tougher than anyone else in that environment." To prepare for the role, Blanche spoke with undercover drug officers and went through research material compiled by the writers. Phoenix was filmed over 13 weeks, which suited Blanche, who preferred not to stay with a show for too long, and aired in early 1993. In 1997, Blanche appeared in the comedy-drama feature film Road to Nhill as Jill Whitton.

In 1999, Blanche began teaching the Meisner technique at The Sydney Actors Playhouse. She also attended the VCA School of Film and Television, where she wrote and directed the short film The Other Days of Ruby Rae. The plot follows a widowed vicar (Norman Kaye) whose faith is renewed when he befriends a 10-year-old. Blanche received a nomination for Best Screenplay in a Short Film at the 2000 AFI Awards. The film won the George Méliès Award at the Taos Talking Pictures Film Festival. Blanche has since gone on to direct television commercials. In 2001, she won the Young Director of the Year Award at the Cannes Lions International Festival of Creativity for her work on a commercial for Australian feminine hygiene company Cottons. The following year, she signed with Academy Films and relocated to London.

== Filmography ==
=== Film ===
Year	Title	Role	Notes
1996	Turning April	Voice	Feature film
1997	Road to Nhill	Jill Whitton	Feature film
1999	The Other Days of Ruby Rae	Writer, director	Short film

=== Television ===
Year	Title	Role	Notes
1983	Home	Billie	Recurring role
1984	The Keepers	Kim French	Main cast
1985	Neighbours	Julie Robinson	Main cast
1986	The Flying Doctors	Prue Browning	Episode: "Sins of the Father"
1988–1991	The Flying Doctors	Paula Patterson	Main cast
1990	Col'n Carpenter	Julia Barnes	Main cast
1991	Rose Against the Odds	Jenny Oakes	TV miniseries
1992	The Late Show	Dinner Party Guest	Episode: "#1.17"
1993	Phoenix II	Senior Detective Chris Faithful	Main cast
