= Monica Maughan =

Australian actor (1933–2010)

- Monica Maughan as Pat O'Connell in TV series "Prisoner" (also known as Prisoner: Cell Block H")
- Born: Monica Cresswell Wood; 15 September 1933; Nuku'alofa, Tonga
- Died: 8 January 2010 (aged 76); Melbourne, Victoria, Australia
- Occupation: Actor
- Years active: 1954–2009
- Parent: A. Harold Wood (father)
- Family: Elizabeth Wood-Ellem (sister) H. D'Arcy Wood (brother)

Monica Maughan (née Wood; 15 September 1933 – 8 January 2010) was an Australian actor. Among many roles in a 52-year career in theatre, film, radio, ballet & television, she portrayed Pat O'Connell on the television series Prisoner.

== Early life and education ==
Maughan was born Monica Cresswell Wood in Tonga to Australian missionaries Rev. Dr A. Harold Wood and medical doctor Olive Wood (née O'Reilly). She had 5 brothers and sisters, including historian Elizabeth Wood-Ellem and minister H. D'Arcy Wood.

The family moved to Sydney in 1937 – Monica was three-and-a-half and spoke only Tongan – and shortly afterwards to Melbourne, where her father became principal of Methodist Ladies' College (MLC) and her mother his unofficial deputy.

Maughan attended MLC, where she received her only formal drama training with speech teacher Dorothy Dwyer, and went on to study French at the University of Melbourne, graduating in 1959 with a BA.

Maughan was a member of the Melbourne University Dramatic Club, where she adopted the stage name Maughan. She made her stage debut opposite Barry Humphries in Ben Hecht's fast-paced satire The Front Page in April 1954.

While studying part-time, Maughan worked as a secretary at St Ives Hospital in Melbourne. In 1960, she returned to MLC to teach speech.

== Acting career ==
=== Theatre ===
Maughan launched her professional career with the Union Theatre Repertory Company (UTRC) in 1957 playing Capulet in Jean Anouilh's romantic comedy Ring Round the Moon at Union Theatre, Parkville. Her first lead role came that same year in Beauty and the Beast.

The UTRC, Australia's first professional theatre company, became the Melbourne Theatre Company (MTC) in 1968. It is believed that Maughan appeared in more plays for the company than any other actor. She also directed 2 plays for the MTC. Her last MTC performance was in the premiere production of David Williamson's Scarlett O'Hara at the Crimson Parrot in 2008.

Cast in J. C. Williamson productions in the early 1960s, Maughan spent 1963 to 1966 working in the UK, where she appeared in nine stage productions, including stepping in for Moira Lister when the latter was ill.

Maughan appeared in at least seven plays in her first year back in Australia – most of them lead roles, and throughout the late 1960s was hailed for her stage performances, such as the title role in The Prime of Miss Jean Brodie (1968), directed by MTC founder, John Sumner. In 1971, she won the Melbourne Theatre Award for Best Actress for her portrayal of pregnant spinster Anna Bowers in Donald Howarth's Three Months Gone. Coincidentally, Maughan was three months pregnant at the end of the play's run.

Maughan worked with almost every major theatre company in Australia, including Chekhov's The Cherry Orchard and Alan Bennett's Habeas Corpus for the Queensland Theatre Company in 1978, and the role of Aggie in A Hard God produced by the State Theatre Company of South Australia and Tennessee Williams' Cat on a Hot Tin Roof by Sydney Theatre Company, both in 1981.

Maughan portrayed Miss Prism in the MTC's The Importance of Being Earnest. The production, co-starring Frank Thring, Ruth Cracknell and Geoffrey Rush, was so popular that it toured Australia between 1988 and 1992, and was televised by the ABC.

In 1999, Maughan created the role of Suzanne Beckett in Justin Fleming's Burnt Piano at Belvoir Company B, and demonstrated a command of classical piano played live in each performance. In 2003, she starred in Inheritance by Hannie Rayson.

Maughan extended her repertoire to include non-dancing roles with the Australian Ballet, namely Doreen's mother in The Sentimental Bloke (2002) and Effie's mother in La Sylphide (2005). She did not live to play the title role in Belvoir Company B's Gwen in Purgatory in 2010, a part written for her by Tommy Murphy and directed by Neil Armfield.

=== Television ===
Maughan had roles in Hector Crawford's dramas, including Homicide, Matlock Police and Cop Shop. She was also secretary Jean Ford in the first year of The Box, from 1974 to 1975 and downtrodden prisoner Pat O'Connell for five months in women's-prison drama Prisoner from 1979 to 1980.

Further television credits included Glenview High, soap opera Skyways, The Flying Doctors, The Gillies Republic, comedy series Col'n Carpenter, medical soap opera A Country Practice, children's series The Genie from Down Under, police drama Blue Heelers and legal drama MDA. She also appeared in several miniseries' including Loss of Innocence (1978) and Come in Spinner (1990). She also played Graham Kennedy's grandmother in the 2007 biographical telemovie, The King. Her final television appearance was in The Librarians.

Maughan received an AFI Award and a Silver Logie Award for her performance as Monica McHugh in the ABC’s black comedy miniseries, The Damnation of Harvey McHugh (1994).

=== Film ===
Maughan's approximately twenty feature films include A City's Child (1971), Road to Nhill (1997), Crackerjack (2002) and Strange Bedfellows (2004), plus a number of films by Dutch-Australian director Paul Cox. Her last film role was in Blessed, directed by Ana Kokkinos in 2009, and described by 3RRR film critic Brian MacFarlane as "Maughan's best ever".

== Personal life ==
Maughan's first marriage was to Brian Essex, then a medical student, in December 1954, with her father officiating at the wedding. They divorced in 1957. Her second marriage, in January 1968, was to Melbourne solicitor Rowland Ball. The couple had three daughters.

Maughan was coy about her age and many sources gave her year of birth as 1938. When celebrating 50 years of professional acting in 2007, Maughan said she was "20 or 21" in 1954 and admitted she "always lied about my age".

Maughan died 8 January 2010, aged 76, from cancer, at the Peter MacCallum Cancer Centre in Melbourne.

== Filmography ==
=== Film ===
Year	Title	Role	Type
1967	The Winter's Tale	Lady (uncredited)	Feature film
1971	A City's Child	Woman	Feature film
1977	The Getting of Wisdom	Miss Day	Feature film
1979	Burn the Butterflies	Senator Brairley Anderson	TV film
1982	Desolation Angels (aka Fair Game)	Liz's Mother	Feature film
1984	Annie's Coming Out (aka A Test of Love)	Vera Peters	Feature film
1985	Emerging	Mrs. McNair	TV film
1985	Handle With Care	Margaret	TV film
1986	Cactus	Bea	Feature film
1987	Bachelor Girl	Sybil	Feature film
1990	Golden Braid	Antique Shop owner	Feature film
1991	A Woman's Tale	Billy's Daughter	Feature film
1997	Road to Nhill	Nell	Feature film
1997	Halifax f.p.: Someone You Know	Miss Morris	TV film
1998	Mrs Craddock's Complaint	Mrs. Craddock	Film short
1998	Edithvale	Edith	Film short
1999	Fragments		Film short
1999	Unfinished Business		Film short
2000	The Calling	Sister Margaret Mary	Film short
2001	Bowl Me Over	Mavis	Film short
2001	Finding Hope	Stella	TV film
2002	Crackerjack	Eileen	Feature film
2002	Halifax f.p.: Takes Two	Mrs. Hunter	TV film
2004	Strange Bedfellows	Faith	Feature film
2005	Night	Woman	Film short
2006	The King	Nana Scott	TV film
2007	Noise	Elderly Woman	Feature film
2008	Salvation	Gallery Visitor	Feature film
2009	Blessed	Laurel Parker	Feature film

=== Television ===
Year	Title	Role	Type
1962	Consider Your Verdict	Elizabeth Carter	1 episode
1964	First Night	Rita	1 episode
1964	Story Parade	Sister Theophilus	1 episode
1965	Thursday Theatre		1 episode
1967–1973	Homicide	Mrs. Hunter / Helen Johnston / Irene West	3 episodes
1968	Salome	Herodias	Teleplay
1973–1975	Matlock Police	Louise Morgan / Ruth McBride / Mrs. Lane	3 episodes
1974	This Love Affair		Episode 2: "Tilting at Windmills"
1974–1975	The Box	Jean Ford	137 episodes
1977	Young Ramsay	Shirley Watt	1 episode
1978	Glenview High	Mrs. Wills	1 episode
1978	Loss of Innocence	Mother	Miniseries, 4 episodes
1978–1984	Cop Shop	Iris Baker / Jane Sutton / Mrs. Eileen Courtnay / Thelma Latimer	9 episodes
1979	Skyways	Mrs. Jones	1 episode
1979–1980	Prisoner	Pat O'Connell	40 episodes
1980	Lawson's Mates	Mrs. Spicer	1 episode
1980	All The Green Years	Mrs. Reeves	Miniseries, 6 episodes
1981	The Patchwork Hero	Aunt Victoria	Miniseries, 6 episodes
1983	Carson's Law	Matron	2 episodes
1984	Special Squad	Mrs. Trane	Episode 8: "The Würzburg Link"
1985	The Flying Doctors	Jean Hennessy	Miniseries, 3 episodes
1986	The Gillies Report	Various characters	6 episodes
1989	The Flying Doctors	Bea Kelly	1 episode
1989; 1994	A Country Practice	Bea Murray	2 episodes
1990	The Importance Of Being Earnest	Miss Prism	Teleplay
1990	Come in Spinner	Mrs. Scott	Miniseries, 2 episodes
1990–1991	Col'n Carpenter	Dawn Carpenter	7 episodes
1992	Boys from the Bush	Alice	1 episode
1993	Seven Deadly Sins	Lorna	TV film series, episode 3: "Sloth"
1994	A Country Practice	Peg Reynolds	1 episode
1994	The Damnation of Harvey McHugh	Monica McHugh	13 episodes
1996; 1998	The Genie From Down Under	Miss Mossop	13 episodes
1998	Close Up – Shoot Out at St Anthony's		1 episode
1998	Small Tales & True	Heather Formica / Joan	2 episodes
1998; 2002	Blue Heelers	Berly Toogood / Doris Little	2 episodes
1999	Noah's Ark	Rachel	Miniseries, 2 episodes
1999	Pig's Breakfast		
2002	Flipside		1 episode
2002	MDA	Justice Hoffman	2 episodes
2004	Stories from the Golf	Irma	1 episode
2006	Nightmares & Dreamscapes: From the Stories of Stephen King	Woman in Street	Miniseries, 1 episode
2007	The Librarians	Irma	1 episode

== Theatre ==
=== As actor ===
Year	Title	Role	Type	Ref
1954	The Front Page		University of Melbourne	
1954	Terror Australis	Dancer	University of Melbourne	
1954	Ned Kelly		University of Melbourne	
1957	Ring Round the Moon	Capulet	University of Melbourne with Union Theatre Repertory Company	
1957	Speak of the Devil		University of Melbourne with Union Theatre Repertory Company	
1957	Beauty and the Beast	Jane (Beauty)	University of Melbourne with Union Theatre Repertory Company	
1958	The Making of Moo	Elizabeth Compton	University of Melbourne with Union Theatre Repertory Company	
1958	Lola Montez	Gisela	University of Melbourne with Union Theatre Repertory Company	
1958	A Streetcar Named Desire	Eunice	University of Melbourne with Union Theatre Repertory Company	
1958	Hotel Paradiso	Violette	University of Melbourne with Union Theatre Repertory Company	
1958	The Knight of the Burning Pestle	Mistress Merrythought	University of Melbourne with Union Theatre Repertory Company	
1958	Blood Wedding	The Bride	University of Melbourne with Union Theatre Repertory Company	
1958	The Threepenny Opera	Vixen	University of Melbourne with Union Theatre Repertory Company	
1958	Lysistrata	Chorus of old women	University of Melbourne with Union Theatre Repertory Company	
1958	Hips and Haws: A Review	Horizontal Girl	University of Melbourne with Union Theatre Repertory Company	
1958–1959	Look Back in Anger	Allison Porter	University of Melbourne, VIC country tour with Union Theatre Repertory Company	
1959	Orpheus Descending		University of Melbourne with Union Theatre Repertory Company	
1959	Venus Observed	Perpetua	University of Melbourne with Union Theatre Repertory Company	
1960	Nothing Sacred		Star Theatre, Melbourne with Aquarius Productions	
1961	The Amorous Prawn	Private Biddy O'Hara W.R.A.C.	Comedy Theatre, Melbourne, Theatre Royal, Adelaide with J. C. Williamson's	
1963	Woman in a Dressing Gown	Hilda, the neighbour	Comedy Theatre, Melbourne, Her Majesty's Theatre, Adelaide with J. C. Williamson's	
1965–1966	Any Wednesday	Ellen / Dorothy (understudy)	Apollo Theatre, London, Wyndham's Theatre, London	
1966	The Winter's Tale	Lady	Assembly Hall, Edinburgh with Edinburgh Festival, Venice Festival with Piccolo Theatre Company & Cambridge Theatre, London, with Pop Theatre	
1967	A Delicate Balance	Julia	Russell St Theatre, Melbourne, with Union Theatre Repertory Company	
1967	The Right Honourable Gentleman	Mrs Sarah Gray	Russell St Theatre, Melbourne, Canberra Theatre with Union Theatre Repertory Company	
1967	Luv		St Martins Theatre, Melbourne	
1967	The Heiress	Mrs Lavinia Penniman	Russell St Theatre, Melbourne, with Union Theatre Repertory Company	
1967	A Cup of Tea with Mrs Groom		La Mama, Melbourne	
1967	Rhinoceros	Daisy	Russell St Theatre, Melbourne with Melbourne Theatre Company (MTC)	
1967	Death of a Salesman	The Woman	Russell St Theatre, Melbourne with Melbourne Theatre Company (MTC)	
1967	A Flea in Her Ear	Olympe Feraillon	Russell St Theatre, Melbourne with Melbourne Theatre Company (MTC)	
1968	The Crucible	Elizabeth Proctor	Russell St Theatre, Melbourne with Melbourne Theatre Company (MTC)	
1968	The Prime of Miss Jean Brodie	Jean Brodie	Russell St Theatre, Melbourne with Melbourne Theatre Company (MTC)	
1969	Loot		Russell St Theatre, Melbourne with Melbourne Theatre Company (MTC)	
1969	Hotel in Amsterdam		Russell St Theatre, Melbourne with Melbourne Theatre Company (MTC)	
1971	A Delicate Balance		Russell St Theatre, Melbourne with Melbourne Theatre Company (MTC)	
1971	Three Months Gone	Anna Bowers	Russell St Theatre, Melbourne with Melbourne Theatre Company (MTC)	
1973	Old Times		Russell St Theatre, Melbourne with Melbourne Theatre Company (MTC)	
1973	The Prisoner of Second Avenue	Edna		
1973	Paying the Piper		Comedy Theatre, Melbourne with MTC	
1975	The Double Dealer		Russell St Theatre, Melbourne, with MTC	
1975	Wednesday the 31st		La Mama, Melbourne with MTC	
1975	Absurd Person Singular		St Martins Theatre, Melbourne, with MTC	
1975	The Revenger's Tragedy	Gratiana	St Martins Theatre, Melbourne, with MTC	
1975–1976	Kid Stakes	Emma	Russell St Theatre, Melbourne, VIC country tour, Canberra Theatre Centre with MTC	
1976	Martello Towers		St Martins Theatre, Melbourne, with MTC	
1977	Fifth Australian National Playwrights' Conference		Canberra	
1977	The Three Sisters	Olga	Sydney Opera House with Old Tote Theatre Company	
1978	Makassar Reef	Wendy Ostrov	Russell St Theatre, Melbourne with MTC	
1978	Elegy for a Boy Musician		Melbourne Athenaeum with MTC	
1978	The Cherry Orchard	Madame Ranevsky	SGIO Theatre, Brisbane, with QTC	
1978	Habeas Corpus	Circus Style Performer	SGIO Theatre, Brisbane, with QTC	
1980	Lock Up Your Daughters		Monash University, Melbourne	
1981	A Hard God	Aggie	Playhouse, Adelaide with STCSA	
1981	Bleedin' Butterflies	May Sewell	Playbox Theatre, Melbourne	
1981	Farewell Brisbane Ladies	Gert Anderson	Theatre 62, Adelaide, Playbox Theatre, Melbourne, with STCSA	
1981	Cat on a Hot Tin Roof		STC	
1982	A Whip Round for Percy Grainger	The Son	Playbox Theatre, Melbourne	
1982	Long Day's Journey into Night	Mary Tyrone	St Martins Youth Arts Centre, Melbourne, with Playbox Theatre Company	
1982	Sea Drift	Freda Richards	Playbox Theatre, Melbourne	
1983	Gulls	Mollie / Mrs Dwyer	Russell St Theatre, Melbourne, with MTC	
1983	Summer	Xenia	Playbox Theatre, Melbourne	
1984	The Kid	Kid	St Martins Theatre, Melbourne, with Playbox Theatre Company	
1984	Loot	Fay	Russell St Theatre, Melbourne, with MTC	
1985	Other Places: One for the Road / Victoria Station / A Kind of Alaska		Melbourne Athenaeum with MTC	
1985	Trumpets and Raspberries	Rosa Beradi	Playhouse, Melbourne with MTC	
1986	She Stoops to Conquer	Mrs Hardcastle		
1986	Blithe Spirit	Madame Arcati		
1987	Salonika		Russell St Theatre, Melbourne, with MTC	
1987	Away		Townsville Civic Hall with New Moon Theatre Company	
1988	The Popular Mechanicals	Tom Snout, tinker	Russell St Theatre, Melbourne, Playhouse, Adelaide with MTC	
1988–1992	The Importance of Being Earnest	Miss Prism	Australian tour with MTC	
1989	The Secret House	Cath	Anthill Theatre, Melbourne with Playbox Theatre Company	
1991	Racing Demon		Playhouse, Melbourne with MTC	
1991	Uncle Vanya	Marina, the old nurse	Russell St Theatre, Melbourne, with MTC	
1991	Morning Sacrifice	Miss Margaret Sole	Russell St Theatre, Melbourne, with MTC	
1992	When She Danced	Mary Desti	Russell St Theatre, Melbourne, with MTC	
1994	Angels in America	Rabbi Isidor Chemelwitz / Hannah Porter Pitt / Ethel Rosenberg / The Angel Asiatica	Playhouse, Melbourne, Playhouse, Adelaide, with MTC	
1995	Flame of Freedom – Australia Remembers		Brisbane Entertainment Centre	
1996	My Father's Father	Ilse	Fairfax Studio, Melbourne with MTC	
1996	A Cheery Soul	Mrs Hibble / Mr Furze	Playhouse, Melbourne, with MTC	
1996	The Last Yankee	Karen	Fairfax Studio, Melbourne with MTC	
1996	Memorial to George Fairfax AM Hon LLD		St Paul's Cathedral, Melbourne	
1996	Competitive Tenderness	Merle / Roy	Malthouse Theatre, Melbourne with Playbox Theatre Company	
1996–1997	The Sunday Roast		La Mama, Melbourne, Castlemaine	
1998	Tear From a Glass Eye	Irene	Malthouse Theatre, Melbourne, with Playbox Theatre Company	
1998	The Piccadilly Bushman	Grace Bourne	Malthouse Theatre, Melbourne, with Playbox Theatre Company	
1999	Burnt Piano	Suzanne Beckett	Belvoir St Theatre, Sydney, with Company B	
1999	Elegies for Angels, Punks and Raging Queens		Melbourne Athenaeum	
2001	The Rain Dancers	Nan	Fairfax Studio, Melbourne with MTC	
2002	Ballet Blokes	Dancer	State Theatre, Melbourne with The Australian Ballet	
2002	Great Expectations	Camilla Pocket / Mrs Coiler	Playhouse, Melbourne, Sydney Opera House with MTC	
2002	The Sentimental Bloke	Doreen's mother	The Australian Ballet	
2003	Inheritance	Dibs Hamilton	Playhouse, Melbourne, Sydney Opera House with MTC	
2003	Les Liaisons Dangereuses		Playhouse, Melbourne with MTC	
2005	Ivanov	Avadotia	Fortyfivedownstairs, Melbourne	
2005	La Sylphide	Effie's mother	The Australian Ballet	
2007	Toy Symphony	Mrs Walkham	Belvoir St Theatre, Sydney, with Company B	
2008	Scarlett O'Hara at the Crimson Parrot	Maureen	Playhouse, Melbourne, with MTC	
2008	Gala		Southbank Theatre, Melbourne, with MTC	

=== As director ===
Year	Title	Role	Type
1985	The Celebrated	Director	Melbourne Athenaeum with MTC
1986	Some Night in Julia Creek	Director	Russell St Theatre, Melbourne, with MTC

=== Radio ===
Year	Title	Role	Type	Ref
	Sightseeing	Lorna	ABC Radio	

== Awards ==
Year	Work	Award	Category	Result
1968	The Prime of Miss Jean Brodie	Erik Awards	Acting	Won
1971	Three Months Gone	Erik Awards	Best Actress	Won
1971	Three Months Gone	Melbourne Theatre Awards	Best Actress	Won
1971	A City's Child	Australian Film Institute Awards	Hoyts Prize for Best Performance in Film	Won
1982	Gulls	Green Room Awards	Best Supporting Actress	Won
1985	The Flying Doctors	Television Society of Australia	Penguin Certificate of Special Recognition for Performance by an Actress in a Supporting Role in a Miniseries	Commendation
1987	Blithe Spirit	Green Room Awards	Best Supporting Actress	Won
1989	The Importance of Being Earnest	Green Room Awards	Best Supporting Actress	Won
1994	The Damnation of Harvey McHugh	Logie Awards	Silver Logie for Most Outstanding Actress	Won
1994	The Damnation of Harvey McHugh	Australian Film Institute Awards	Best Actress in a TV Drama	Won
1998	Tear from a Glass Eye	Green Room Awards	Best Actress	Won
2008	The Toy Symphony	Critics Choice Awards	Best Supporting Actress	Won
