= Belinda (film) =

- Directed by: Pamela Gibbons
- Written by: Pamela Gibbons
- Produced by: Bedrich Kabriel
- Starring: Deanne Jeffs; Kaarin Fairfax
- Cinematography: Malcolm McCulloch
- Edited by: David Huggett
- Music by: Les Gock
- Distributed by: Summer City Distribution
- Release date: 1988
- Running time: 97 minutes
- Country: Australia
- Language: English
- Budget: A$2.4 million

Belinda is a 1988 Australian film directed by Pamela Gibbons, which stars Deanne Jeffs in the title role. The film was also known as Midnight Dancer.

== Plot ==
Sixteen-year-old Belinda (Deanne Jeffs) has aspirations of becoming a ballerina. Despite hailing from a straitlaced family, and living at home with her parents, she takes a job as an exotic dancer in a sleazy cabaret club in Sydney's Kings Cross, to make ends meet.

Eventually, Belinda realises her goals, but not before experiencing the ups and downs of her new reality, encountering nefarious characters along the way.

== Cast ==
- Deanne Jeffs as Belinda
- Mary Regan as Crystal
- Kaarin Fairfax as Sandra
- Nico Lathouris as Benny
- Hazel Phillips as Doreen
- John Jarratt as Graeme
- Elizabeth Lord as Mandy
- Gerda Nicolson as Belinda's Mother
- Alan Cassell as Belinda's Father
- Tim Burns as Jamie
- Caz Lederman as Rhonda

== Production ==
The film was autobiographical for Pamela Gibbons. It was shot in Sydney, from August to October 1986 and was produced by Fontana Film. International sales were handled by Summer City Distribution Ltd.

== Release ==
Belinda had its world premiere 11 May 1987 at the Cannes Film Festival. It premiered in Australian theatres on 1 August 1988.

== Reception ==
Australian film critic David Stratton from At the Movies reviewed the film for Variety, stating: "Belinda is light on narrative but very strong on atmosphere and character" and "Technically, Belinda is good, with solid camerawork by Gibbons’ husband, Malcolm McCullogh, and a very sharp soundtrack." He awarded the film four stars.

Paul Byrnes, guest reviewer for The Movie Show gave the film three stars, said: "The best thing about the movie is that it’s very irreverent and funny... Gibbons writes good, tough dialogue that’s often very funny, and she’s assembled a mostly strong cast to play the hard-boiled chorus girls." He went on to say: "But the film falters in the second half – a life that once seemed glamorous and exciting to Belinda now becomes sour and violent. But perhaps, ironically, the film loses some of its edge at the same time; it becomes more socially worthy and Gibbons loses contact with the characters. The lesson she wants us all to learn – that the girls were terribly exploited – becomes more important, and that tends to deaden the drama. It’s a pity because the movie has a lot going for it otherwise."

== Awards ==
Date	Award	Category	Nominee	Result	Ref.
1987	Australian Film Institute Awards	Best Achievement in Cinematography		Nominated	
1987	Australian Film Institute Awards	Best Achievement in Sound		Nominated	
1987	Australian Film Institute Awards	Best Supporting Actress	Kaarin Fairfax	Nominated	
1987	Australian Film Institute Awards	Best Original Screenplay		Nominated	
1988	Australian Cinematographers Society Awards	Merit Award	Malcolm McCulloch	Won	
