= A City's Child =

- Directed by: Brian Kavanagh
- Written by: Don Battye
- Based on: a story by Brian Kavanagh
- Produced by: Brian Kavanagh
- Starring: Monica Maughan; Sean Scully
- Cinematography: Brian Kavanagh
- Edited by: Brian Kavanagh
- Music by: Peter Pinne; Mayfield B. Anthony
- Production company: Kavanagh Productions
- Distributed by: British Empire Films
- Release date: 23 March 1972
- Running time: 80 minutes
- Country: Australia
- Language: English
- Budget: $30,000

A City's Child is a 1972 Australian film directed by Brian Kavanagh.

== Plot ==
A woman cares for her aging and bedbound mother. One day, the woman brings home a stray kitten and later that day, her mother dies. Left alone, the woman then starts drifting into a fantasy world. She begins collecting Barbie dolls and meets a young man who may or may not be real, though the two of them become lovers. The film leaves it ambiguous as to what has actually occurred.

== Cast ==
- Monica Maughan as the woman
- Sean Scully as the man
- Moira Carleton as the mother
- Vivean Gray as first neighbour
- Marguerite Lofthouse as second neighbour
- Beverley Heath as shopgirl
- Michael Howell as doctor
- Roger Scales as man on beach
- Donna Drake as girl on beach
- Mary Marshall as woman on train

== Production ==
The film was shot on 16mm with some financial assistance from the Experimental Film and Television Fund. Shooting took place over four weeks, half in a small studio belonging to Cambridge Films, half on location in various suburbs. After completion of filming, the Australian Film Development Corporation provided $5,000 to enable the film to be blown up to 35mm.

The National Film and Sound Archive contains a 1970 black-and-white film made by Chris Löfvén called The making of the film A City's Child: Home movie.

== Release ==
The film played in the London, Edinburgh, Chicago and Sydney Film Festivals. Monica Maugham won Best Female Actor at the 1972 AFI Awards. However the film was not widely screened, in part because the movie was refused registration under the quality clause of the New South Wales Film Quota Act.

== Reception ==
In one 1972 review of a Sydney Film Festival screening, Dougal McDonald wrote in The Canberra Times that the film "can hardly be called entertaining (though it) is made with general competence but no great brilliance except for Don Battye's script. Nevertheless, it must be rated as a significant Australian feature and a silver star for the experimental film and television fund... One measure of a film's success is the amount of discussion it engenders. On this basis, A City's Child must rate high... It cannot avoid being analysed and argued about."

In 1980, David Stratton wrote of the film that it had 'perhaps too slight a story for such a long film; but Kavanagh proves himself adept at unsettling the audience and keeps several surprises up his sleeve'. He adds that 'Monica Maughan is excellent as the lonely woman and the drab interiors of the house are well photographed by Bruce McNaughton.' In his brief overview of the film's story, Stretton is open to the notion that Maughan's character becomes pregnant; Brian McFarlane, writing in 1987, is of the opinion that she only 'believes herself to have a child.'

In his Australian Film & TV Companion, Tony Harrison describes the film thus: 'Average drama about a sheltered middle-aged woman who, after the death of her over-protective mother, fantasises that she meets and falls in love with a young man.' Harrison adds the detail that the film was based on a short story by Brian Kavanagh, The Dolls.
