= Loss of Innocence (TV series) =

1978 television film directed by Michael Carson

- Written by: John May
- Directed by: Michael Carson; Eric Tayler
- Starring: John Fitzgerald; Carol Burns; Edward Howell
- Country of origin: Australia
- Original language: English
- No. of episodes: 4 x 1 hour

Production
- Producer: Eric Taylor

Original release
- Network: ABC
- Release: 17 February – 10 March 1978

Loss of Innocence is a 1978 mini-series about the life of a man from the Great Depression to the 1970s.

== Cast ==
- Ronald Falk as Father
- Monica Maughan as Mother
- Carol Burns as Eleanor
- John Fitzgerald as Peter Robinson
- David Franklin as Peter Robinson
- Alwyn Kurts as Leonard
- Enid Lorimer as Gran
- Jacqueline Kott as Mrs Buckland
- Julieanne Newbould as Lesley
- Edward Howell
- Carol Raye as Julie
- Michele Fawdon
