= Turning April =

1995 film directed by Geoff Bennett

Turning April is a 1996 Australian-Canadian film.

== Premise ==
The wife of a diplomat is kidnapped.

== Cast ==
- Tushka Bergen as April
- Aaron Blabey as Leif
- Dee Smart as Kyra
- Justine Clarke as Rosa
- Judi Farr as Mother
- John Gregg as Attorney-General
- Vikki Blanche as voice
- Michael Veitch as voice

== Reception ==
Variety said "Several themes juggle for attention in" the film "which is part kidnap drama, part romance and part revenge movie, but dramatic structure remains unresolved. Despite a good perf from Tushka Bergen as a young wife kidnapped by an unlikely gang of thieves, long-delayed pic isn’t likely to elicit much box office interest."
