= Col'n Carpenter (TV series) =

Australian television sitcom (1990–91)

- Opening title card for the first episode.
- Genre: Sitcom
- Created by: Philip Dalkin; Doug MacLeod
- Written by: Doug MacLeod; Rob Caldwell; Rob Menzies; and others
- Starring: Kim Gyngell; Stig Wemyss; Vikki Blanche; Kaarin Fairfax; Anne Phelan
- Opening theme: "Colin's Theme" (Series 1–3)
- Composers: Chris Harriott (Series 1–3); Kim Gyngell and Curtain Street Studios (Series 4)
- Country of origin: Australia
- Original language: English
- No. of series: 4
- No. of episodes: 61

Production
- Producers: Doug MacLeod (Series 1); John Wild (Series 1); Charles Tingwell (Series 2–3); Riccardo Pellizzeri (Series 4)
- Camera setup: Multi-camera
- Running time: 25 minutes

Original release
- Network: Network Ten
- Release: 11 February 1990 – 9 December 1991

Col'n Carpenter is an Australian television sitcom that was first broadcast on Network Ten from 11 February 1990 to 9 December 1991. The series, which served as a spinoff to the television sketch comedy The Comedy Company, starred Kim Gyngell as Colin Carpenter, a character who had originally appeared in that sketch series. The series also starred Stig Wemyss, Vikki Blanche, Kaarin Fairfax and Anne Phelan.

Despite receiving largely negative reviews throughout its run, the series ran for 61 episodes across four series.

== Premise ==
The series followed the life and interactions of Colin Carpenter, an uneducated layabout who moves out of his mother's home to begin living in a flatshare with two housemates, schoolteacher Julia and environmentalist Michael. In early episodes, Colin's mother occasionally visits the trio, much to their annoyance. When Julia leaves at the end of the first series, she is replaced by nurse Linda.

== Cast ==
- Kim Gyngell as Colin Carpenter
- Stig Wemyss as Michael Preeble
- Vikki Blanche as Julia Barnes
- Kaarin Fairfax as Linda Wiiliams
- Anne Phelan as Mrs Fuller
- Monica Maughan as Dawn Carpenter (recurring role)

== Episodes ==
=== Series overview ===
Series	Episodes	Originally released	
Series	Episodes	First released	Last released
1	25	11 February 1990	29 July 1990
2	13	3 March 1991	26 May 1991
3	13	2 June 1991	2 September 1991
4	10	7 October 1991	9 December 1991

=== Series 1 (1990) ===
No. overall	No. in series	Title	Directed by	Written by	Original release date
1	1	"He's Leaving Home"	Chris Langman	Philip Dalkin & Doug MacLeod	11 February 1990
2	2	"Peter and the Penguin"	Chris Langman	Doug MacLeod	18 February 1990
3	3	"Love and Theft"	Chris Langman	Doug MacLeod	25 February 1990
4	4	"The Doors of Perception"	Chris Langman	Doug MacLeod	4 March 1990
5	5	"Everybody Needs Good Neighbours"	Unknown	Unknown	11 March 1990
6	6	"He's Having a Baby (Part 1)"	Chris Langman	Doug MacLeod	18 March 1990
7	7	"He's Having a Baby (Part 2)"	Chris Langman	Doug MacLeod	25 March 1990
8	8	"A Cry in the Dark"	Chris Langman	Doug MacLeod	1 April 1990
9	9	"Thick as Thieves"	Chris Langman	Doug MacLeod	8 April 1990
10	10	"Dog Eat Dog"	Kendal Flanagan	Doug MacLeod	15 April 1990
11	11	"The Inverted Swan"	Kendal Flanagan	Doug MacLeod	22 April 1990
12	12	"On Pittswood Pond"	Kendal Flanagan	Doug MacLeod	29 April 1990
13	13	"The Invisible Man"	Kendal Flanagan	Doug MacLeod	6 May 1990
14	14	"Wheels on Fire"	Kendal Flanagan	Doug MacLeod	13 May 1990
Additional material written by Glenn Robbins.
15	15	"Travelling North"	Kendal Flanagan	Doug MacLeod	20 May 1990
16	16	"The Exterminating Angel"	Chris Langman	Philip Dalkin & Kim Gyngell	27 May 1990
17	17	"The Big Sleep"	Kendal Flanagan	Doug MacLeod	3 June 1990
18	18	"It's Not a House, It's a Home!"	Chris Langman	Stig Wemyss & Kim Gyngell	10 June 1990
19	19	"That Obscure Object of Desire"	Chris Langman	Catherine Shortened	17 June 1990
20	20	"How Green Was My Telly"	Unknown	Unknown	24 June 1990
21	21	"Reading Gaol"	Kendal Flanagan	Doug MacLeod	1 July 1990
22	22	"The Man in the Brown Suit"	Chris Langman	Doug MacLeod	8 July 1990
23	23	"Geoffrey the Spider"	Chris Langman	Doug MacLeod	23 July 1990
This is the first episode to be billed solely as Col'n Carpenter, rather than Ten's Comedy Hour. Mark Mitchell's Larger Than Life, the second programme that made up Ten's Comedy Hour, was discontinued, and a new programme, The Big Time, also starring Mitchell, began airing in its place. In place of the planned episode of Ten's Comedy Hour on 15 July, an episode of The Comedy Company aired instead, after being on hiatus since the end of 1989.
24	24	"Have Gumboots Will Travel"	Chris Langman	Paul Leadon	30 July 1990
25	25	"Guess Who's Coming to Dinner, or, The Crack in Julia's Head"	Chris Langman	Angela Webber & Doug MacLeod	6 August 1990

=== Series 2 (1991) ===
No. overall	No. in series	Title	Directed by	Written by	Original release date
26	1	"The Opportunity of a Lifetime"	Unknown	Unknown	3 March 1991
27	2	"The Imaginary Invalid"	Unknown	Unknown	10 March 1991
28	3	"The Murder Room"	Unknown	Unknown	17 March 1991
29	4	"Sweet Nerd of Youth"	Unknown	Unknown	24 March 1991
30	5	"Dusty Daffodils"	Charles Tingwell	Doug MacLeod	31 March 1991
31	6	"Shock of the Nude"	Chris Adshead	Rob Caldwell & Rob Menzies	7 April 1991
32	7	"Silver Threads"	Chris Adshead	Doug MacLeod	14 April 1991
33	8	"Pink Feathers"	Chris Adshead	Doug MacLeod	21 April 1991
34	9	"Dem Bones"	Chris Adshead	Doug MacLeod	28 April 1991
35	10	"Pop the Question"	Charles Tingwell	Rob Caldwell & Rob Menzies	5 May 1991
Incorrectly listed as "Dem Bones" in The Canberra Times TV Guide.
36	11	"The Eighth Man"	Chris Langman	Doug MacLeod	12 May 1991
37	12	"A Kind of Loving (Part 1)"	Unknown	Unknown	19 May 1991
38	13	"A Kind of Loving (Part 2)"	Tina Butler	Rob Caldwell & Rob Menzies	26 May 1991

=== Series 3 (1991) ===
No. overall	No. in series	Title	Directed by	Written by	Original release date
39	1	"A Tiger's Tale"	Kendal Flanagan	Rob Caldwell & Rob Menzies	2 June 1991
40	2	"A Fine Romance"	Kendal Flanagan	Doug MacLeod	9 June 1991
41	3	"Pittswood Picasso"	Kendal Flanagan	Elizabeth Coleman	16 June 1991
42	4	"The Outsider"	Mark Collins	Rob Caldwell & Rob Menzies	23 June 1991
43	5	"Two Degrees Below Hero"	Charles Tingwell	Rob Caldwell & Rob Menzies	30 June 1991
44	6	"Losers at Love"	Mark Collins	Elizabeth Coleman	7 July 1991
45	7	"Somebody for Everybody"	Chris Adshead	Rob Caldwell & Rob Menzies	14 July 1991
46	8	"The Overnight Bag"	Unknown	Unknown	21 July 1991
Repeated the following week, 28 July 1991.
47	9	"Better Be Home Soon"	Unknown	Unknown	5 August 1991
48	10	"Skin Deep"	Chris Adshead	Rob Caldwell & Rob Menzies	12 August 1991
49	11	"The Go-Between"	Unknown	Unknown	19 August 1991
50	12	"Long Goodbye (Part 1)"	Unknown	Unknown	26 August 1991
51	13	"Long Goodbye (Part 2)"	Unknown	Unknown	2 September 1991

=== Series 4 (1991) ===
No. overall	No. in series	Title	Directed by	Written by	Original release date
52	1	"Boy Meets Girl"	Riccardo Pellizzeri	Rob Caldwell & Rob Menzies	7 October 1991
53	2	"The Man Who Knew Too Much"	Unknown	Unknown	14 October 1991
54	3	"You're Mad 'n' I'm Not"	Unknown	Unknown	21 October 1991
55	4	"And the Logie Goes Too"	Riccardo Pellizzeri	Rob Caldwell & Rob Menzies	28 October 1991
56	5	"Coming Home"	Riccardo Pellizzeri	Rob Caldwell & Rob Menzies	4 November 1991
57	6	"The Brother of the Wolf"	Unknown	Unknown	11 November 1991
58	7	"Rare to Well Done"	Riccardo Pellizzeri	Rob Caldwell & Rob Menzies	18 November 1991
59	8	"Siege of Tucker's Stump"	Unknown	Unknown	25 November 1991
Incorrectly listed as "Rare to Well Done" in The Canberra Times TV Guide.
60	9	"Le Sacred Blurr"	Unknown	Unknown	2 December 1991
61	10	"Parruppa Pum Pum"	Unknown	Unknown	9 December 1991

== Production ==
=== Development ===
The character of Colin Carpenter was created by Kim Gyngell, first appearing in the sketch show The Comedy Company (1988–90). After The Comedy Company went on hiatus in 1989, two spinoffs were created: Larger Than Life, starring Mark Mitchell, and Col'n Carpenter. The two spinoffs premiered together consecutively on 11 February 1990, billed as Ten's Comedy Hour. Indeed, the two series were billed together in this manner until they began to be billed separately from 23 July 1990. Gyngell had concerns transferring his character from appearing in three-minute sketches to being the lead in a sitcom. Carpenter's backstory was developed for the series and he became a more rounded character, with elements of pathos being written into his character. Gyngell was noted for remaining in the persona of Carpenter long after recordings took place.

The series served as the first comedy role for Vikki Blanche, who played Julia. Blanche had to learn new acting skills required for the comedic role, observing the performances of Kim Gyngell and Monica Maughan, who played Colin's mother. Barnes had input into how her character developed. Barnes was contracted to the series for twenty-six weeks, leaving the series after a year. She told TV Week's David Brown in December 1990 that, although she had learned a lot, she wished to move on from the series and challenge herself. In late October 1990, following the conclusion of the first series, Australian newspapers reported that the series was to be cancelled; however, Len Downs, the reporter of programming at Network Ten, stated that the claims were "totally untrue".

When the show returned for a second series in March 1991, Blanche was replaced by Kaarin Fairfax. In addition, Charles "Bud" Tingwell joined the series as a producer; he had previously worked with Gyngell and Fairfax. It was the first sitcom that Tingwell had worked on. Despite disappointing ratings for the third series, a fourth series was renewed in August 1991. The series returned to a Monday night timeslot. Gyngell stated to TV Week that "the new timeslot has been a big part of the decision to go on". Fairfax was unable to continue in the series, as she was expected to give birth in October, while Tingwell left as producer due to other commitments. In September, in between the third and fourth series, Wemyss left the series after a falling out with producers. While acknowledging that Carpenter should remain the main focus of the series, Wemyss wished for more storylines to be centred on his character, stating to TV Week that "if you don't expand a character, he just becomes nothing. [...] It was obvious Michael wasn't going to be playing a major part in the way the show was going, so I didn't want to continue”.

The fourth series featured Carpenter living alone. Gyngell stated to TV Week that "he’s quite different now and that was important to follow through. The next obvious step was for Col'n to start surviving on his own". The first episode of that series featured a storyline where Colin's brother, Peter, returns to visit him; however, Peter, played by actress Dale Stevens, has since transitioned into a woman. Gyngell, who created the idea for the episode, stated to TV Week that "the transsexual storyline was mooted 18 months ago, but it was knocked on the head because it worried management. Now, because the show has survived so long, the network has started to trust us a bit more". Stevens later stated that the role was one of her favourites: "It was a real hoot, and I was amazed at how much I looked the part."

The final episode, broadcast on 9 December 1991, was a Christmas special, which was noted by TV Week for "depart[ing] from the usual traditional sitcom formula to acknowledge that for some people it can be a sad time", wherein Carpenter believes he will spend Christmas alone. The episode featured the return of Dale Stevens as Peta, Monica Maughan as Dawn and Roy Baldwin as Len.

=== Filming ===
The series was filmed in Studio A at Nunawading Studios, in front of a live studio audience. Actor Michael Pope served as warm-up comedian. Fairfax stated that the crew had one week to work on each episode; by the end of the week, a new episode would be ready to work on. Each episode was rehearsed, before being recorded on Friday. Wemyss, whose hair was blond, dyed his hair black to play Michael.

== Broadcast ==
The first series, which aired from February to August 1990, was broadcast on Sunday nights at 7:30 pm, before being moved to a Monday night timeslot at 8:00 pm from 23 July. The second series, which aired from March to May 1991, returned to Sunday nights, at 8:00 pm. The third series, airing from June to September of the same year, was broadcast on Sundays at 8:00 pm until 5 August, where it was moved to 7:30 pm. The fourth series returned to the Monday night timeslot, airing from October to December at 7:30 pm.

== Reception ==
The series received largely negative reviews throughout its run. Ian Warden, writing for The Canberra Times, described Ten's Comedy Hour as "so consistently weak and pitiful and embarrassing" that he suggested viewers ignore the show and watch Floyd on France (1987), a cooking programme broadcast on SBS, instead. Robert Macklin, writing for the same newspaper, stated that Capital 10 (now known as CTC) "has some of the worst programs imaginable", listing Ten's Comedy Hour as one of the "examples of the depths to which programming has sunk on that network". Writing midway through the series, Warden stated that Fast Forward (1989–1992), a sketch comedy broadcast on Prime Television, "easily eclipses" Ten's Comedy Hour, which he described as "now unwatchable".

Mark Wallace, in a review for The Canberra Times written at the end of the first series, stated that, while Mark Mitchell's new sketch comedy The Big Time (1990) was "actually funny", Col'n Carpenter's Kim Gyngell "ran out of amusing lines when his partnership with Mitchell bit the dust in last year's edition of The Comedy Company". Conversely, Pam Casellas, writing between the first and second series, praised the development of Gyngell's character, writing that he is "too human" to be laughed at comfortably and that there is "a slightly uneasy feeling about him which gives him that extra comic dimension and sets him apart". In a separate article written midway through the second series, Casellas reported that series producer Bud Tingwell had agreed with her statement that Carpenter was "one of the truly great – perhaps the only great – comic character that has come out of Australian television".

=== Ratings ===
The first series of Col'n Carpenter was grouped together with Larger Than Life under the banner title Ten's Comedy Hour; ratings were calculated for both series, rather than each show being rated individually. In April 1990, the first series had attracted 20 percent of the viewing audience. By 3 May, the series was ranked third in the top twenty highest-rating programmes for the first week of the ratings period. The following week, the series attracted 17 percent of the viewing audience. However, viewing ratings dropped significantly by early June, the series attracting approximately 8 percent of the viewing audience. By 22 July, the series had reached number five in the top sixteen highest-rated programmes for the week.

Ratings for the third series, which aired between June to September 1991, were "disappointing". By 11 November, the fourth series was ranked twentieth in the top twenty highest-rating programmes for the week, tied with sitcom All Together Now (1991–93).
