= StalkHer =

2015 film directed by John Jarratt and Kaarin Fairfax

- Original theatrical release poster
- Directed by: John Jarratt; Kaarin Fairfax
- Written by: Kristijana Maric
- Produced by: John Jarratt; Kristijana Maric
- Starring: John Jarratt; Kaarin Fairfax
- Cinematography: Jody Muston
- Edited by: Mat Evans
- Music by: Mark D'Angelo; Craig Jansson
- Release date: 27 August 2015
- Running time: 90 minutes
- Country: Australia
- Language: English

StalkHer is a 2015 Australian romantic comedy thriller film directed by John Jarratt and Kaarin Fairfax – both also star in the film. It was filmed in Queensland, predominantly on the Gold Coast.

== Plot synopsis ==
John Jarratt stars as Jack, who is pushed past the brink of his stalking obsession over Emily (Kaarin Fairfax) when he breaks into her house to take what he wants by force. However, his plans backfire when he wakes up to find himself tied to a chair in her kitchen. For a full night, Jack and Emily engage in a twisted and thrilling courtship of the sexes that leads one to wonder which one of them will survive the night. At the end of the movie, Jack finally gets the upper hand on Emily and strangles her to death.

== Cast ==
- John Jarratt as Jack
- Kaarin Fairfax as Emily
- Alan Finney as Mr. Schiller
- Robert Coleby as Dr. Jacob Weeks
- Charlie Jarratt as Alex

== Reception ==
On Rotten Tomatoes the film has an approval rating of 33% based on reviews from 6 critics.

Jim Schembri of 3AW gave a positive review, writing "Veteran John Jarratt co-directed this with Kaarin Fairfax, and while they let fly at each other with copious energy, their verbal conflagration could have benefitted from fewer swear words, more jokes and a tighter running time." Erin Free of film magazine Filmink called the film "a nifty little black comedy bubbling and bristling with surprises and invention."

John Noonan, also from Filmink, gave a negative review, writing "Whilst it doesn't stick its landing when the credits roll, Wolf Creek fans are perhaps going to get a kick out of seeing Jarratt failing to get the upper hand for a change." Luke Buckmaster of Guardian called it "a marathon of smut, with nothing remotely funny or thrilling about it."

== Soundtrack ==
StalkHer (Original Soundtrack) by various artists was issued on 31 July 2015 via Remote Control Records. The title track was recorded by Maddy and Memphis Kelly (Kaarin's daughters) and released as the soundtrack's second single.

StalkHer (Original Soundtrack)
No.	Title	Writer(s)	Performer(s)	Length
1.	"Red Right Hand"	Nick Cave, Mick Harvey, Thomas Wydler	Nick Cave	6:11
2.	"Peach Melba"	Hadeed Pourshafighi	Hadeed Pourshafighi	1:25
3.	"Horror Movie"	Greg Macainsh	Skyhooks	3:47
4.	"Blue Footed Booby"	Ronald Kocinsky	Duke Bannister	3:55
5.	"Karen"	Robert Forster	The Go-Betweens	4:08
6.	"Cosi Fan Tutte (Soave Sia Il Vento)"	Wolfgang Amadeus Mozart, Lorenzo Da Ponte	Australian Opera	2:49
7.	"Black Widow"	Peter Northcote, John Jarratt, Richard "Ric" Herbert	Ric Herbert	5:48
8.	"Mirror Lady"	Mark D'Angelo, Craig Jansson, Tony Ianiro	Mark D'Angelo, Craig Jansson, Tony Ianiro	4:12
9.	"What You Want"	Dan Sultan, Paul Kelly	Vika and Linda and the RocKwiz Orkestra	3:35
10.	"Dogs Are Talking"	Doc Neeson, Bob Spencer, Richard Brewster, Brent Eccles, James Morley	the Angels	3:24
11.	"StalkHer"	D'Angelo, Jansson, Ianiro	Maddy and Memphis Kelly	4:04
12.	"I See Red"	Tim Finn	Split Enz	3:15
13.	"My Man"	Alexander Gow	Sarah Blasko	4:08
14.	"Killer in Me"	D'Angelo, Jansson, Ianiro	John Jarratt	3:06
15.	"She's a Lady"	Jarratt	John Jarratt	2:47
Total length:				56:34
