= Be Our Guest (TV series) =

- Genre: Musical
- Starring: Jacki Weaver
- Country of origin: Australia
- Original language: English

Production
- Producer: Alan Burke
- Running time: 30 minutes

Original release
- Network: ABC
- Release: 3 October 1966

Be Our Guest is a 1966 Australian TV series produced by Alan Burke for the ABC. It was set in a motel near an airport where international guests stayed.

== Cast ==
- Sean Scully as Cousin Sean
- Lorraine Bayly as Lorraine, the air hostess
- Jacki Weaver as Jacki
- Gordon Glenwright as Grandpa
- Jack Allan
- Lionel Long
- Normie Rowe
