= The Daughter-in-Law =

Play by D. H. Lawrence

- Original language: English
- Written by: D. H. Lawrence
- Characters: Mrs Gascoyne; Joe Gascoyne; Mrs Purdy; Minnie Gascoyne; Luther Gascoyne; Cabman

Premiere
- Date: 16 March 1967
- Place: Royal Court Theatre, London, England

The Daughter-in-Law is the first play by D. H. Lawrence, completed in January 1913. Lawrence described it as "neither a tragedy nor a comedy - just ordinary". It was neither staged nor published in his lifetime.

The first stage production, by Peter Gill at the Royal Court Theatre in 1967, contributed to a reappraisal of Lawrence's dramatic writing. In 1968, The Times Literary Supplement said it was "a fine and moving piece of work" that "ought to be as well known as Sons and Lovers and the best Nottinghamshire stories". In 2012, the critic Michael Billington described it as "quite extraordinary ... one of the great British dramas of the 20th century".

== Characters ==
- Mrs Gascoyne
- Mrs Purdy
- Joe Gascoyne
- Minnie Gascoyne
- Luther Gascoyne
- Cabman

== Production history ==
The play, directed by Peter Gill, premiered on 16 March 1967 at the Royal Court Theatre, London. The cast comprised Gabrielle Daye, Anne Dyson, Victor Henry, Judy Parfitt, and Mike Pratt.

Much later, it was revived at The Young Vic in 2002 under Artistic Director David Lan, with The Guardian calling it "one of the great British dramas of the 20th century".

A year after, the Mint Theater Company produced the play in 2003 in New York City with The New York Times naming it a top ten production of the year.

In 2018, Arcola Theatre produced the play directed by Jack Gamble

== Adaptations ==
In 2015, the National Theater with the Royal Exchange Theater co-produced Husbands and Sons, an adaption that wove together The Daughter-In-Law, A Collier’s Friday Night, and The Widowing of Mrs Holroyd into a single three-hour narrative. The three D. H. Lawrence plays were adapted by Ben Power and the production was directed by Marianne Elliott

=== Television ===
In 1985, the BBC broadcast a production directed by Martyn Friend with Sheila Hancock as Mrs Gascoigne, Cherie Lunghi as Minnie and David Threlfall as Luther.

== Sources ==
- Worthen, John D.H. Lawrence: The Early Years 1885-1912 Cambridge: Cambridge University Press, 1991. 458–60.
