= Frankston Arts Centre =

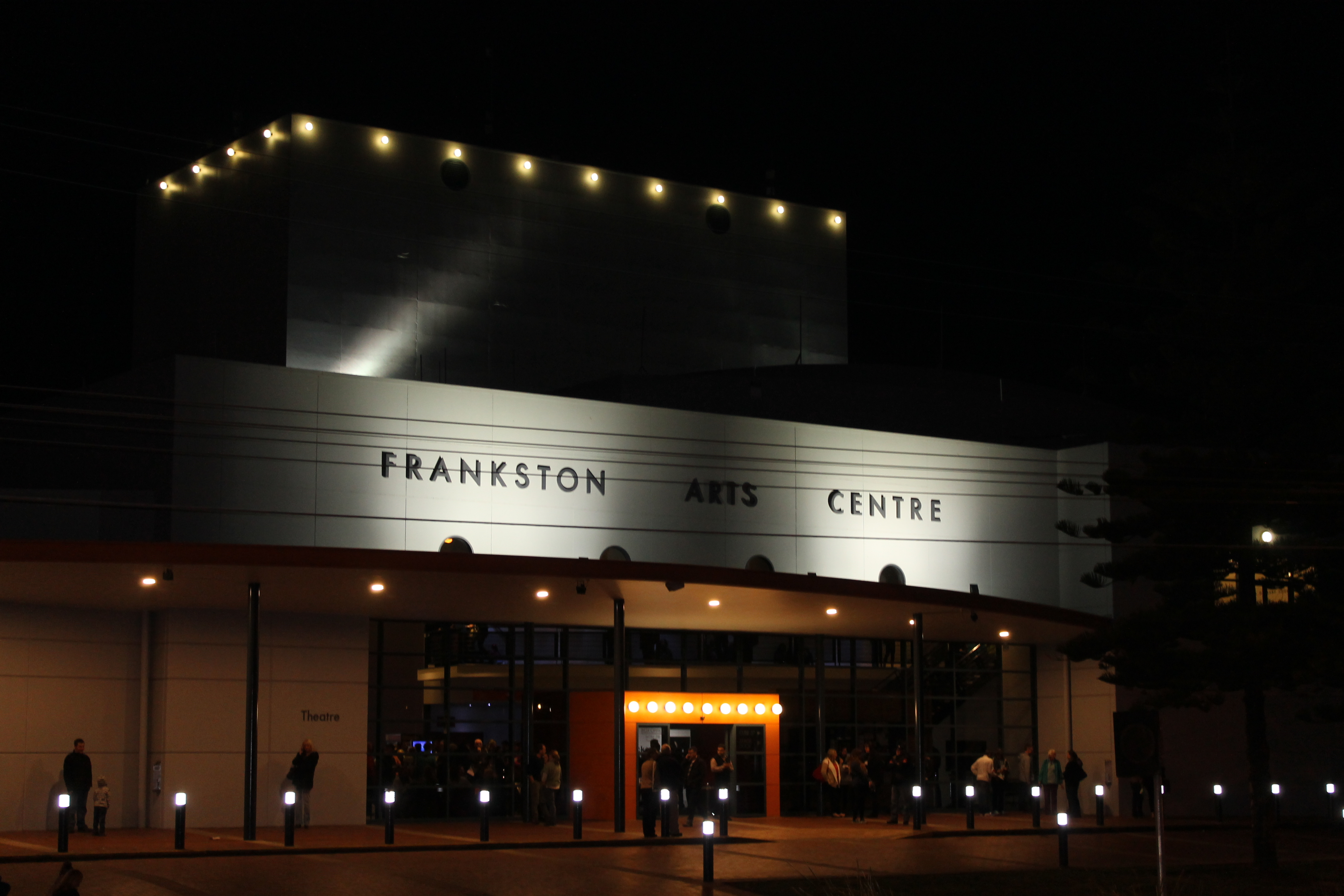
- Interactive map of the Frankston Arts Centre area
- Former names: Frankston Cultural Centre

General information
- Type: theatre and art gallery
- Location: Frankston, Victoria, Australia
- Coordinates: 38.146125°S 145.123494°E
- Completed: 1995
- Owner: Frankston City Council

Height
- Height: 22m to fly tower grid floor

Design and construction
- Architect: Daryl Jackson

The Frankston Arts Centre is a landmark theatre and art gallery in the outer Melbourne suburb of Frankston in Victoria, Australia. The centre plays host to a number of major performances, including regular shows by the Melbourne Symphony Orchestra and Victorian Opera, and is a tour venue for the Australian Opera, Bell Shakespeare Company, Melbourne International Film Festival, Sydney Dance Company as well as a number of other national production companies. It was opened by then Prime Minister of Australia, The Hon. Paul Keating, on 20 May 1995.

== Facilities ==
=== Centre ===
The Centre houses 800 seat theatre, boasting the second largest proscenium arch stage in Victoria, a 60-line fly tower and state of the art technical and staging equipment. It also houses a function centre which can seat up to 500, and which plays host to a range of events - including corporate and community expos, seminars, gala dinners, and awards ceremonies. The function centre comprises two rooms (which can be opened up to form one large room) which have expansive views across Port Phillip.

=== Cube37 ===
Cube37 is the centre's "creative space" and has a large adaptable performance studio with flexible seating for up to 200 people. It also houses a wet studio, meeting rooms, media suites and two exhibition galleries. It is located next to the centre and was opened by then Prime Minister of Australia, The Hon. John Howard, on 30 March 2001, as part of the celebrations for the centenary of the federation of Australia.

Cube37 also hosts a new media art program which is displayed throughout the year in its Glass Studio (a large glass-fronted exhibition space with street frontage). Cube37 also provides much of the centre's community access programs with workshops, exhibitions and youth arts projects running throughout the year.
