= One Night the Moon =

2001 film by Rachel Perkins

- Paul Kelly, Memphis Kelly, Kaarin Fairfax; Singing lullaby "One Night the Moon"
- Directed by: Rachel Perkins
- Written by: John Romeril; Rachel Perkins
- Produced by: Kevin Lucas; Paul Humfress; Aanya Whitehead
- Starring: Paul Kelly
- Cinematography: Kim Batterham
- Edited by: Karen Johnson
- Music by: Paul Kelly; Kev Carmody; Mairead Hannan
- Distributed by: Dendy Films
- Release date: 8 November 2001
- Running time: 57 minutes
- Country: Australia
- Language: English

One Night the Moon is a 2001 Australian musical film made for television, starring husband-and-wife team Paul Kelly, a singer-songwriter, and Kaarin Fairfax, a film and television actress, along with their daughter Memphis Kelly. The film was directed by Rachel Perkins and co-written by Perkins with John Romeril. In 2009 Romeril adapted the script as a musical theatre work.

Kelton Pell portrayed an Aboriginal tracker, Albert Yang, with Ruby Hunter playing his wife, who searches for the missing child. Musical score was by Kelly, Kev Carmody and Mairead Hannan, and with other artists they also contributed to the soundtrack. The film won ten awards, including two Australian Film Institute Awards.

== Plot ==
Set in the 1930s Australian Outback, starring singer Paul Kelly as a farmer, Jim Ryan, newly settled in the area. He is the father of a girl, Emily (Memphis Kelly, his real life daughter), who climbs out the window of their farmhouse one night and follows the moon into the hills. Rose Ryan (Kelly's then wife Kaarin Fairfax and mother of Memphis) comes to check on her daughter only to find that Emily is missing.

The Ryans get the local police, led by a sergeant (Chris Haywood), to search for her, but when their Aboriginal tracker, Albert Yang (Kelton Pell) arrives, the father says he does not want any blacks on his land. Jim Ryan and the white police go searching for Emily, but they cannot find her. Eventually Rose goes to Albert's hut and together they go looking for Emily, they find her dead in the hills and bring her body back home. Jim blames himself for not finding Emily and commits suicide. Albert's wife (Ruby Hunter) sings the funeral song for the lost child.

== Cast ==
- Paul Kelly as Jim Ryan
- Kaarin Fairfax as Rose Ryan
- Memphis Kelly as Emily Ryan
- Kelton Pell as Albert Yang
- Ruby Hunter as Albert's wife
- Chris Haywood as police sergeant
- David Field as Allman

== Production ==
One Night the Moon was inspired by the story of Aboriginal tracker, Alexander Riley as depicted in Black Tracker (1997), a documentary directed by Riley's grandson, Michael Riley. Alexander Riley had worked for the New South Wales police in Dubbo in the early 1900s, finding wanted criminals, missing persons and hidden caches. Composer/singer Mairead Hannan saw the documentary and formed a project with her sister Deirdre Hannan, Kelly, Carmody, Alice Garner, Romeril and Perkins. Aside from the search for a missing child, the film deals with the racist attitude depicted by the father's refusal to use an Indigenous tracker.

Hannan wanted to tell the story as a musical for a project sponsored by ABC TV's Arts and Entertainment department. Mairead enlisted her sister and fellow composer Deirdre Hannan, then other composers/performers Kelly, Kev Carmody and Garner to help with the project. Screenwriter John Romeril and director Rachel Perkins were approached and together wrote the screenplay. Garner was due to take the part of Rose Ryan, the mother, but became pregnant so Kaarin Fairfax (Kelly's wife) undertook the role. Aside from the search for a missing child, the film deals with the racist attitude depicted by the father's refusal to use the indigenous tracker. The original story was about the tracker seeking a young boy who had gone missing, but Perkins decided a missing girl would have greater impact and also shifted the focus to the despairing mother. Fairfax and Kelly volunteered their seven-year-old daughter, Memphis Kelly, for the part of the lost child.

Location filming occurred on Adnyamathanha land in the Flinders Ranges and other sites in South Australia for six weeks early in 2000. Kelton Pell portrayed the Indigenous tracker, Albert with Ruby Hunter playing his wife. Musical score was by Kelly, Kev Carmody and Mairead Hannan, and with other artists they also contributed to the soundtrack.

== Awards ==
Awards and nominations received by One Night the Moon include:

Year	Nominee / work	Award	Result
2002	Kim Batterham — Cinematography	Australian Cinematographers Society; Award of Distinction; Telefeatures, TV Drama & Mini Series	Won
2001	Kim Batterham — Cinematography	Australian Film Institute (AFI) Awards; Best Achievement in Cinematography in a Non-Feature Film	Won
2001	Mairead Hannan, Kev Carmody, Paul Kelly — Score	AFI Open Craft Award; Non-Feature Film Original Score	Won
2001	John Romeril, Rachel Perkins — Scriptwriters	Australian Writers' Guild (AWG); AWGIE Awards; Television — Television Original	Won
2001	Romeril, Perkins — Scriptwriters	AWG; Major Award	Won
2001	Hannan, Carmody, Kelly — Score	Film Critics Circle of Australia (FCCA); Best Music Score	Won
2001	Perkins — Unique achievement in the combination of sound, image and music.	FCCA; Special Achievement Award	Won
2001	Perkins — Director	Inside Film Awards; Best Direction	Nominated
2001	Karen Johnson — Editing	IF Awards; Best Editing	Nominated
2001	Perkins — Director	New York International Independent Film and Video Festival (NYIIFVF); Genre Award; Best Feature Film – Musical	Won
2001	Batterham — Cinematography	NYIIFVF; Best Cinematography	Won
2002	Paul Kelly, Mairead Hannan, Kev Carmody, John Romeril, Deirdre Hannan and Alice Garner – Soundtrack contribution	Australasian Performing Right Association (APRA) Awards/Australian Guild of Screen Composers (AGSC) Awards; Screen Music Award; Best Soundtrack Album	Won

== One Night the Moon: Original Soundtrack ==
Track listing
Songwriters according to Australasian Performing Right Association (APRA), with performers listed after track times.

1. "I Don't Know Anything More" (Paul Kelly) – (2:08) Paul Kelly
2. "Flinders Theme" (Mairead Hannan) – (2:11) Mairead Hannan
3. "One Night the Moon" (P Kelly, John Romeril) – (2:34) Kaarin Fairfax, Memphis Kelly
4. "Moon Child" (M Hannan, Deirdre Hannan) – (2:21) M Hannan, Deirdre Hannan
5. "The Gathering" (M Hannan) – (0:59) M Hannan
6. "Now Listen Here: Introduction to This Land is Mine" (M Hannan, D Hannan, Alice Garner) – (1:27) M Hannan, D Hannan, Alice Garner
7. "This Land is Mine" (P Kelly, Kev Carmody) – (2:41) P Kelly featuring Kelton Pell
8. "The March Goes On/The Gathering 2" (medley) (M Hannan, M Hannan) – (1:20) M Hannan
9. "Spirit of the Ancients" (K Carmody) – (1:31) Kev Carmody
10. "What Do You Know" (M Hannan, D Hannan, P Kelly, K Carmody) – (4:08) K Fairfax, K Pell
11. "Carcass/The Gathering 3" (medley) (M Hannan, M Hannan) – (1:07) M Hannan
12. "Night Shadows" (M Hannan, D Hannan, A Garner, K Carmody) – (1:44) K Carmody, A Garner
13. "Black and White" (K Carmody) – (1:49) K Carmody
14. "Moment of Death" (M Hannan) – (4:04) M Hannan
15. "Hunger" (M Hannan, D Hannan) – (2:17) M Hannan, D Hannan
16. "Unfinished Business" (P Kelly, K Carmody) – (1:56) K Pell, K Fairfax
17. "Spirit of the Ancients" (reprise) – (2:18) K Carmody
18. "Moody Broody" (D Hannan) – (0:46) D Hannan
19. "Little Bones" (M Hannan, P Kelly) – (3:25) K Fairfax
20. "Oh Breathe on Me" – (1:55) Ruby Hunter
21. "Moonstruck" (Carmody) – (4:40) K Carmody

Credits

- Kev Carmody — guitar, vocals, didjeridu
- Kaarin Fairfax — vocals
- Ruby Hunter — vocals
- Paul Kelly — guitar, vocals
- Yuri Worontschak — piano, engineer, mixing

== Box office ==
One Night the Moon grossed $276,270 at the box office in Australia.

== Stage adaptation ==
Romeril subsequently adapted One Night the Moon as a musical theatre work. The stage adaptation was first performed by Melbourne's Malthouse Theatre, opening 16 September 2009, directed by Wesley Enoch and with Mairead Hannan as musical director. The cast included Natalie O'Donnell, Kirk Page, Mark Seymour and Ursula Yovich.
