= Three Months Gone =

1970 play by Donald Howarth

Three Months Gone is a 1970 British play by Donald Howarth.

The original production at the Royal Court Theatre starred Diana Dors. The Financial Times said that Dors "gives a stunning performance". Her reviews were generally excellent and the role marked a comeback for her.
