= When Dad Married Fury =

Play by David Williamson

- Original language: English
- Written by: David Williamson
- Subject: family
- Genre: comedy

Premiere
- Date: 23 July 2011
- Place: Metcalfe Theatre, Perth

When Dad Married Fury is a 2012 play by David Williamson.

== Plot ==
Two brothers, engineer Ian and arts lecturer Ben, are upset when their father Alan, marries an American woman, Fury, half his age who is a fundamentalist Christian. Ben's wife Laura blames Alan for the suicide of her father. Matters are complicated by Laura's mother Judy, Ian's corporate lawyer wife Sue, Laura and Ben's daughter Adele and her girlfriend Sonya.

== Background ==
Williamson was inspired to write the play by attending a wedding where one of the guests turned up with a new American wife half his age. He was also inspired by reading about unscrupulous financial advisers who operated prior to the GFC.

The play premiered in Perth. After that production, Williamson did some rewrites and moved a character only spoken about in that production to the centre of the action on stage. "It was almost a different play when it opened in Sydney" said Williamson.
