= 2000 in Australian television =

== Television ==
- 1 January – The Seven Network introduces a new logo, the first one to not have the 7 inside a circle, which is still in use as of today.
- 7 January – American sitcom Everybody Loves Raymond airs on the Seven Network for the very last time. It would change broadcasts to Network Ten on 28 November.
- 17 January – Australian soap opera Something in the Air premieres on ABC. It was the very first Australian television series to be filmed in widescreen.
- 31 January – American police procedural, legal, crime drama television series Law & Order: Special Victims Unit makes it debut on Network Ten.
- 31 January – Dragon Ball Z premieres on Network Ten as part of Cheez TV. Originally using the censored Ocean Productions dub before switching to the uncut Funimation dub.
- 1 February – Popstars becomes the first Australian reality talent show, earning massive ratings for the Seven Network, leading to Bardot, the end product of the show. It becomes the first Australian act to debut at the number 1 position with both its debut single and debut album.
- 3 February – Disaster strikes for the long running Australian children's TV series Play School as the ABC sacks its producer Henrietta Clark. Long-time presenters George Spartels, Benita Collings, David James, Colin Buchanan and Angela Moore all depart in order to make way for a revamped version in the show's 34-year history.
- 7 February – Author, journalist and former Four Corners presenter Paul Barry takes over as host of the Australian media analysis television program Media Watch presenting up until 6 November.
- 8 February – Australia's Funniest Home Video Show returns and starts in 2000 with a new look format, a new theme song and a relocation from Sydney to Melbourne. Also on that month, it moved to "Every Saturday Nights" at 6:30 PM.
- 21 February – The Nine Network's Australian game show Sale of the Century returns by rebranding their name to Sale of the New Century and celebrates 20 years on air.
- 22 February - The American police procedural series Third Watch premieres on the Nine Network.
- 26 February – The Nine Network debuts a brand new Saturday morning Warner Bros. themed wrapper program for children called The Cool Room as a replacement of its previous program What's Up Doc? which had been axed on Christmas Eve 1999.
- 27 February – The first ever reality TV show to debut in Australia, The Mole debuts on the Seven Network. Five more seasons follow.
- 6 March – Australian sports based talk show The Fat premieres on ABC.
- 12 March – The 1997 film Bean, starring British comedian Rowan Atkinson as his most famous character Mr. Bean and based on the British sitcom of the same name, premieres on the Seven Network.
- 13 March – In response to GTV-9's Burgo's Catch Phrase losing its ratings, the Seven Network's smash-hit puzzle show, Wheel of Fortune changes the new cash values on the Wheel. The changes including the rising of the top dollars, were from $500 to $750 in Round 1, $1000 to $1500 in Rounds 2 & 3 and $2000 to $2500 in Round 4. The Proton car Wedge is introduced on the wheel. The show's highest-rating 4000th Episode was screened on 13 June, then the Battle of the Champions special was screened in September, before it followed with the Sydney Olympics.
- 3 April – American children's television series Bear in the Big Blue House is broadcast on ABC airing on free for air television in Australia for the first time two years after its Australian debut on the Disney Channel.
- 24 April – Australian comedy series Pizza makes its premiere on SBS.
- 24 April – Jan Moody wins the first season of The Mole, taking home $115,000 in prize money. Alan Mason is revealed as the Mole, and Abby Coleman is the runner-up.
- 1 May – Digimon makes it debut on Network Ten.
- 7 May – The 1996 film The Frighteners starring Michael J. Fox premieres on Network Ten.
- 20 May – Australian-American science fiction television series Farscape premieres on the Nine Network airing for the first time in Australia after the previous year when it first aired on The Sci-Fi Channel in the United States. The series was produced by The Jim Henson Company and Hallmark Entertainment.
- 27 May – Network Ten broadcasts the final episode of the Australian satirical panel game show Good News Week.
- 8 June – Australian soap opera Home and Away airs on ITV in the UK for the very last time after being broadcast on the network for 11 years. It will return to air on British television on Channel 5 on 16 July 2001. The show's year-long absence occurs because of a clause in ITV's contract preventing it from being broadcast for at least a year after its ITV run ends.
- 2 July – Batman & Robin premieres on the Nine Network.
- 16 July – The 1997 film Conspiracy Theory starring Mel Gibson and Julia Roberts premieres on the Nine Network.
- 17 July – Australian cooking show Fresh premieres on the Nine Network.
- 18 July – Former Hey Hey It's Saturday team member/Red Faces gong master judge Red Symons, became the first celebrity to miss the $500,000 question on the three-hour celebrity special on Who Wants to Be a Millionaire?.
- 14 August – National Nine News updates its theme and on air graphics to coincide with the launch of Digital TV.
- 27 August – Australian drama series SeaChange returns for a third season on ABC.
- 28 August – Then 58-year-old Brisbane resident Trevor Sauer becomes the first person to win $500,000 on Who Wants to Be a Millionaire?.
- 15 September – The Sydney Olympics earn record ratings for Channel 7 with the Olympic opening and closing ceremonies, and its continuous coverage.
- 9 October – Rove McManus's weekly talk show Rove Live makes its debut on Network Ten after it was axed by the Nine Network in 1999.
- 15 October – The 1997 film The Peacemaker starring George Clooney and Nicole Kidman premieres on the Nine Network.
- 6 November – Australian media analysis television program Media Watch is axed by the ABC as the host of the program Paul Barry had been sacked by the network's managing director Jonathan Shier.
- 18 November – The 1997 slasher film Scream 2, the sequel to the 1996 film Scream, premieres on the Nine Network.
- 28 November – American sitcom Everybody Loves Raymond switches over to airing on Network Ten.
- 28 November – The American drama series The West Wing premieres on the Nine Network.
- 30 November – The American drama series Judging Amy premieres on the Nine Network.
- 2 December – The 1997 film Spice World starring British pop group the Spice Girls premieres on the Seven Network.
- 9 December – Final episode of the Australian drama series SeaChange is broadcast on the ABC.
- 20 December – American cartoon Life with Louie begins transmission on Seven Network. This is the first time it aired on free TV in Australia, after Fox Kids began airing it around 1996.
- 27 December – Long running Australian soap opera Neighbours begins airing on television stations in Ireland for the very first time on RTÉ.
- The famous Touched by Berlei Hands TV commercial depicting a young woman with long dark hair, shown in the lead up to the Sydney Olympics, goes to air for the very first time.
- TV stations conduct test transmissions in digital.

=== Channels ===
==== New channels ====
- 1 January – CNNfn
- 2 December – Fox Classics Shared with Fox Kids

== Debuts ==
=== Free-to-air ===
==== Domestic ====
Program	Channel	Debut date
The Human Journey	ABC	4 January
Flashback	ABC	17 January
Something in the Air	ABC	17 January
Popstars	Seven Network	1 February
Above the Law	Network Ten	1 February
The New Adventures of Ocean Girl	Network Ten	11 February
Download	Nine Network	14 February
The Cool Room	Nine Network	26 February
The Mole	Seven Network	27 February
The Fat	ABC	6 March
The Game	Seven Network	23 March
Backyard Blitz	Nine Network	9 April
Dogwoman	Nine Network	9 April
Pizza	SBS	24 April
Going Home	SBS	22 May
Grass Roots	ABC	1 June
Unreal Ads	Network Ten	8 June
Mikey, Pubs and Beer Nuts	Network Ten	11 July
Fresh	Nine Network	17 July
The Potato Factory	Seven Network	17 July
AMV	Seven Network	17 July
Dreamhome	Nine Network	18 July
Zirkos Kids	NBN Television	31 July
One Size Fits All	ABC	30 August
The Dream with Roy and HG	Seven Network	16 September
Sam and The Fatman	Nine Network	5 October
Rove Live	Network Ten	9 October
Search for a Supermodel	Network Ten	11 October
Surprise Surprise	Nine Network	17 October
Eugenie Sandler P.I.	ABC	30 October
Wicked	Seven Network	18 November
Gloria's House	Seven Network	25 November
Cushion Kids	Nine Network	28 November
Li'l Horrors	Seven Network	2000
Pepsi Live	Network Ten	2000

==== International ====
Program	Channel	Debut date
(United States) Mercy Point	Network Ten	2 January
(United States) / (Canada) Vor-Tech: Undercover Conversion Squad	Network Ten	3 January
(United States) The Awful Truth	SBS	4 January
(United Kingdom) Painted Lady	Seven Network	7 January
(United Kingdom) / (Isle of Man) / (Germany) Space Island One	Nine Network	7 January
(France) / (Italy) The Count of Monte Cristo (1998)	ABC	7 January
(Canada) More Tears	SBS	22 January
(United Kingdom) Donovan Quick	ABC	23 January
(United Kingdom) The Cops	ABC	26 January
(United Kingdom) Living Britain	ABC	29 January
(United States) Law & Order: Special Victims Unit	Network Ten	31 January
(Japan) Dragon Ball Z	Network Ten	31 January
(United Kingdom) Smack the Pony	ABC	3 February
(United Kingdom) Country House	Nine Network	5 February
(United States) Honey, I Shrunk the Kids: The TV Show	Seven Network	5 February
(United States) Mickey Mouse Works	Seven Network	5 February
(United Kingdom) David Copperfield (1999)	ABC	6 February
(United Kingdom) Playing the Field	Seven Network	17 February
(United States) Air America	Network Ten	19 February
(United States) Angel	Seven Network	20 February
(United Kingdom) Kid in the Corner	ABC	20 February
(United States) Roswell	Nine Network	21 February
(United States) Power Rangers Lost Galaxy	Seven Network	21 February
(United States) / (Canada) Ed, Edd n Eddy	Seven Network	21 February
(United States) Third Watch	Nine Network	22 February
(United States) / (United Kingdom) Sherlock Holmes in the 22nd Century	Seven Network	8 March
(United Kingdom) Maisie Raine	ABC	11 March
(United Kingdom) Oliver Twist (1999)	ABC	12 March
(Canada) Daring & Grace: Teen Detectives	ABC	14 March
(United Kingdom) Escape from Colditz	ABC	22 March
(United Kingdom) Playing the Field	Seven Network	23 March
(United States) Busted on the Job: Caught on Tape	Seven Network	1 April
(United States) Bear in the Big Blue House	ABC	3 April
(United Kingdom) / (Wales) A Mind to Kill	Seven Network	7 April
(United Kingdom) Nature Boy	ABC	9 April
(United States) Silver Surfer	Network Ten	10 April
(Canada) The Adventures of Sam & Max: Freelance Police	Network Ten	27 April
(United Kingdom) Monarch of the Glen	ABC	30 April
(Japan) Digimon: Digital Monsters	Network Ten	1 May
(Australia) / (United States) Farscape	Nine Network	20 May
(United States) Once and Again	Seven Network	23 May
(United States) Storm Force	Seven Network	29 May
(United Kingdom) The Broker's Man	Nine Network	3 June
(United States) Conrad Bloom	Seven Network	5 June
(United States) I am Weasel	Seven Network	8 June
(United Kingdom) Great Military Blunders	ABC	9 June
(United Kingdom) Baddiel and Skinner Unplanned	SBS	12 June
(United Kingdom) Second Sight	ABC	18 June
(United Kingdom) Stella Street	SBS	26 June
(United States) Max Steel	Network Ten	30 June
(United Kingdom) Little Monsters	ABC	3 July
(United Kingdom) Tweenies	ABC	4 July
(Canada) Franklin	ABC	6 July
(United Kingdom) Babes in the Wood	Seven Network	20 July
(United Kingdom) Clocking Off	ABC	21 July
(South Africa) / (United Kingdom) Game Park	SBS	23 July
(Canada) Da Vinci's Inquest	Seven Network	31 July
(United Kingdom) Animal Stories	ABC	31 July
(United Kingdom) Sophie Grigson's Herbs	SBS	11 August
(United States) Now and Again	Network Ten	15 August
(United Kingdom) Sounds of the Eighties	SBS	25 August
(United Kingdom) / (France) Pablo the Little Red Fox	ABC	30 August
(United Kingdom) The Royle Family	ABC	1 September
(United Kingdom) Badger	ABC	2 September
(United Kingdom) The Vanishing Man	Nine Network	7 September
(United Kingdom) Animal Minds	SBS	10 September
(United Kingdom) Spot's Musical Adventures	ABC	11 September
(Republic of Ireland) / (United States) Mystic Knights of Tir Na Nog	Network Ten	18 September
(United States) / (New Zealand) Young Hercules	Network Ten	18 September
(Canada) / (United States) Eerie, Indiana: The Other Dimension	Network Ten	18 September
(United Kingdom) Tales of the Little Grey Rabbit	ABC	18 September
(United Kingdom) Deceit	ABC	24 September
(United Kingdom) Bad Girls	Seven Network	3 October
(United States) / (Canada) Beggars and Choosers	Seven Network	3 October
(Canada) First Wave	Seven Network	5 October
(United States) Grown Ups	Network Ten	6 October
(United States) Harsh Realm	Seven Network	6 October
(United Kingdom) L.A. 7	Seven Network	7 October
(Canada) Relic Hunter	Network Ten	7 October
(United Kingdom) City Central	Seven Network	11 October
(France) Walter Melon	Network Ten	20 October
(United States) The Secret Files of the Spy Dogs	Network Ten	20 October
(United Kingdom) Invasion: Earth	Nine Network	23 October
(United States) Mortal Kombat: Conquest	Nine Network	26 October
(United Kingdom) Sheeep	ABC	3 November
(United Kingdom) City of the Wildcats	ABC	21 November
(United States) Hope Island	Network Ten	25 November
(United States) Jack and Jill	Nine Network	27 November
(United States) The West Wing	Nine Network	28 November
(United Kingdom) Ken Hom's Travels with a Hot Wok	SBS	28 November
(United States) Young Americans	Network Ten	28 November
(Canada) Bad Dog	Network Ten	29 November
(United States) The Avengers: United They Stand	Network Ten	29 November
(United States) Judging Amy	Nine Network	30 November
(Germany) / (Austria) SimsalaGrimm	ABC	6 December
(United States) Freaks and Geeks	Nine Network	9 December
(United Kingdom) Rex the Runt	SBS	11 December
(Australia) / (Canada) / (United States) BeastMaster	Network Ten	12 December
(United States) Clerks: The Animated Series	Seven Network	13 December
(United Kingdom) / (Canada) / (Germany) Lexx	Seven Network	17 December
(Japan) Willow Town	Network Ten	18 December
(United States) Life with Louie	Seven Network	20 December
(United Kingdom) Robbie the Reindeer	ABC	23 December
(United Kingdom) / (United States) Gormenghast	Seven Network	23 December
(United States) Odd Man Out	Nine Network	30 December
(United States) Detention	Nine Network	2000
(United States) Popular	Seven Network	2000
(France) Soupe Opéra	ABC	2000

=== Subscription television ===
==== Domestic ====
Program	Channel	Debut date
Gloria's House	Oh!	16 October

==== International ====
Program	Channel	Debut date
(United States) 100 Deeds for Eddie McDowd	Nickelodeon	3 March
(United Kingdom) / (Canada) Rotten Ralph	Nickelodeon	4 March
(United States) SpongeBob SquarePants	Nickelodeon	6 March
(United States) Just a Kid	Nickelodeon	7 April
(France) Witch World	Fox Kids	1 July
(United States) Big Guy and Rusty the Boy Robot	Fox Kids	3 July
(United States) / (Canada) Spider-Man Unlimited	Fox Kids	7 July
(Canada) / (United States) Mega Babies	Fox Kids	10 July
(Japan) Monster Rancher	Fox Kids	10 July
(Canada) Angela Anaconda	Nickelodeon	August
(United States) Highlander: The Raven	Fox8	20 November
(United Kingdom) Grange Hill	Nickelodeon	December
(Canada) Radio Active	Nickelodeon	December
(Canada) Pelswick	Nickelodeon	1 December
(United States) Noah Knows Best	Nickelodeon	15 December
(Malaysia) Kampung Boy	Nickelodeon	2000
(Canada) Dogs with Jobs	National Geographic Channel	2000
(Canada) / (France) Mona the Vampire	Nickelodeon	2000
(United Kingdom) / (Canada) / (United States) Anthony Ant	Nickelodeon	2000
(United States) Courage the Cowardly Dog	Cartoon Network	2000
(United States) Mission Hill	The Comedy Channel	2000
(United States) Mike, Lu and Og	Cartoon Network	2000
(United Kingdom) Foxbusters	Nickelodeon	2000
(United States) Sabrina: The Animated Series	The Disney Channel	2000
(South Korea) / (United States) / (Canada) Milo's Bug Quest	Fox Kids	2000
(United Kingdom) Holby City	UKTV	2000
(United States) The Avengers: United They Stand	Fox Kids	2000
(United States) Xyber 9: New Dawn	Fox Kids	2000
(United Kingdom) Grizzly Tales for Gruesome Kids	Oh!	2000
(United States) Roughnecks: Starship Troopers Chronicles	Fox Kids	2000
(Canada) Maggie and the Ferocious Beast	Nickelodeon	2000
(United Kingdom) The Grimleys	UKTV	2000
(United States) Poochini's Yard	Nickelodeon	2000
(United States) Max Steel	Fox Kids	2000
(United States) Open Sesame	Nickelodeon	2000
(Canada) Insectia	National Geographic Channel	2000
(United Kingdom) Belfry Witches	The Disney Channel	2000
(United Kingdom) / (France) 64 Zoo Lane	Nickelodeon	2000
(United Kingdom) Hero to Zero	Nickelodeon	2000
(United Kingdom) Big Meg, Little Meg	Nickelodeon	2000
(New Zealand) Bobbie the Bus	Nickelodeon	2000
(United States) The Amanda Show	Nickelodeon	2000
(Canada) Misguided Angels	Fox Kids	2000

== Specials ==
Program	Channel	Debut date
(United States) 2000 American Comedy Awards	The Comedy Channel	6 August
(United States) Latin Grammy Awards 2000	Arena	4 November

== Documentary specials ==
Program	Channel	Debut date
Africa's Deadly Dozen	National Geographic Channel	4 November
When Dinosaurs Ruled: At the Ends of the Earth	Discovery Channel	16 November
Destination Space	National Geographic Channel	20 November
Wings: Hindenburg: Fire in the Sky	Discovery Channel	26 November

=== Changes to network affiliation ===
This is a list of programs which made their premiere on an Australian television network that had previously premiered on another Australian television network. The networks involved in the switch of allegiances are predominantly both free-to-air networks or both subscription television networks. Programs that have their free-to-air/subscription television premiere, after previously premiering on the opposite platform (free-to air to subscription/subscription to free-to air) are not included. In some cases, programs may still air on the original television network. This occurs predominantly with programs shared between subscription television networks.

==== International ====
Program	New network(s)	Previous network(s)	Date
(United States) The Littles	Network Ten	Nine Network	26 July
(United States) Everybody Loves Raymond	Network Ten	Seven Network	28 November

== Programming changes ==
=== Subscription premieres ===
This is a list of programs which made their premiere on Australian subscription television that had previously premiered on Australian free-to-air television. Programs may still air on the original free-to-air television network.

==== Domestic ====
Program	Subscription network	Free-to-air network	Date
Popstars	Nickelodeon	Seven Network	December

==== International ====
Program	Subscription network	Free-to-air network	Date
(United States) Moonlighting	TV1	Nine Network	4 February
(United Kingdom) Miami 7	Nickelodeon	Seven Network	3 March
(United States) Frasier	TV1	Nine Network	3 July
(United States) Futurama	Fox8	Seven Network	November
(United States) Buffy the Vampire Slayer	Fox8	Seven Network	13 December
(Japan) Pokémon	Cartoon Network	Network Ten	2000
(United States) Voltron: The Third Dimension	Fox Kids	Seven Network	2000

=== Ending this year ===
Program	Channel	End date	Debut date
Flashback	ABC	2000	2000
Chuck Finn	Seven Network	25 December	18 October 1999
SeaChange	ABC	9 December	10 May 1998
Wipeout	Seven Network	24 November	15 February 1999
One Size Fits All	ABC	22 November	30 August 2000
Eugenie Sandler P.I.	ABC	15 November	30 October 2000
Media Watch	ABC	6 November	8 May 1989
Pig's Breakfast	Nine Network	22 October	5 July 1999
The Games	ABC	11 September	7 August 1998
Murder Call	Nine Network	9 October	11 August 1997
Thunderstone	Network Ten	8 September	12 February 1999
The New Adventures of Ocean Girl	Network Ten	5 August	11 February 2000
The Big Breakfast	Seven Network	14 July	2 August 1999
Search for Treasure Island	Seven Network	11 July	17 August 1998
The 10:30 Slot	ABC	16 June	20 August 1999
Lizzie's Library	ABC	29 May	6 November 1995
Good News Week	Network Ten	27 May	19 April 1996
Recovery	ABC	29 April	20 April 1996
Sunday Night Football (AFL)	Seven Network	9 April	28 April 1991
Smallest Room in the House	ABC	17 January	21 April 1997

== Returning this year ==
- 18 September – Sunrise (Seven Network)

== See also ==
- 2000 in Australia
- List of Australian films of 2000
