= 2000 in Australia =

- Monarch: Elizabeth II
- Governor-General: Sir William Deane
- Prime minister: John Howard
- Population: 19,153,000

The following lists events that happened during 2000 in Australia.

- Decades: 1980s; 1990s; 2000s; 2010s; 2020s
- See also: 2000 in Australian television; 2000 in Australian literature; Other events of 2000; Timeline of Australian history

== Incumbents ==
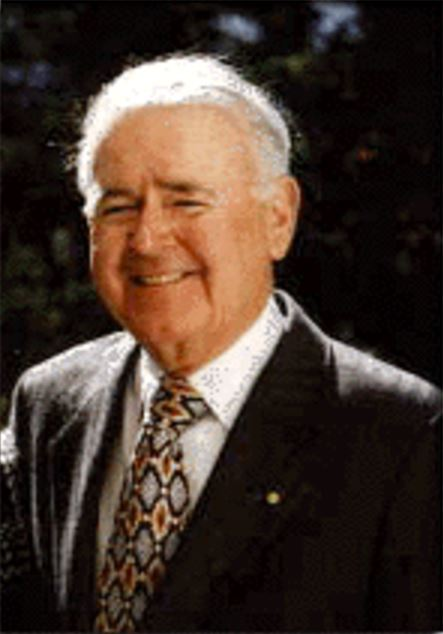
Sir William Deane

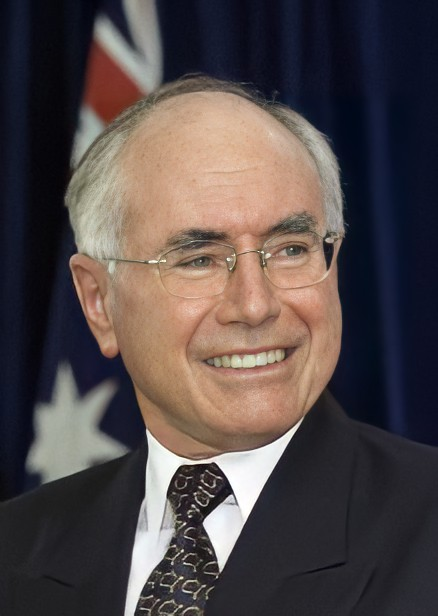
John Howard

- Monarch – Elizabeth II
- Governor-General – Sir William Deane
- Prime Minister – John Howard
  - Deputy Prime Minister – John Anderson
  - Opposition Leader – Kim Beazley
- Chief Justice – Murray Gleeson

=== State and territory leaders ===
- Premier of New South Wales – Bob Carr
  - Opposition Leader – Kerry Chikarovski
- Premier of Queensland – Peter Beattie
  - Opposition Leader – Rob Borbidge
- Premier of South Australia – John Olsen
  - Opposition Leader – Mike Rann
- Premier of Tasmania – Jim Bacon
  - Opposition Leader – Sue Napier
- Premier of Victoria – Steve Bracks
  - Opposition Leader – Denis Napthine
- Premier of Western Australia – Richard Court
  - Opposition Leader – Geoff Gallop
- Chief Minister of the Australian Capital Territory – Kate Carnell (until 18 October), then Gary Humphries
  - Opposition Leader – Jon Stanhope
- Chief Minister of the Northern Territory – Denis Burke
  - Opposition Leader – Clare Martin
- Chief Minister of Norfolk Island – George Smith (until 28 February), then Ronald Nobbs

=== Governors and administrators ===
- Governor of New South Wales – Gordon Samuels
- Governor of Queensland – Peter Arnison
- Governor of South Australia – Sir Eric Neal
- Governor of Tasmania – Sir Guy Green
- Governor of Victoria – Sir James Gobbo (until 31 December)
- Governor of Western Australia – Michael Jeffery (until 18 August), then John Sanderson
- Administrator of the Australian Indian Ocean Territories – Bill Taylor
- Administrator of Norfolk Island – Tony Messner
- Administrator of the Northern Territory – Neil Conn (until 28 November), then John Anictomatis

2000 is to date the last time in which no Federal, State or Territory elections were held and the first time that no general election was held for any house of Parliament since 1942.

== Events ==
=== January ===
- 1 January
  - Serbian President Slobodan Milosevic releases Care Australia worker Branko Jeken from imprisonment in Serbia.
  - The National Archives releases 1969 Cabinet documents.
  - Pakistani cricketer Shoaib Akhtar returns home to Pakistan after the ICC rules that his bowling action during a recent match was illegal.
- 2 January – A massive oil spill occurs off the coast of Phillip Island, endangering the region's penguin population.
- 3 January – When Federal Justice Minister, Senator Amanda Vanstone is asked whether alleged Nazi war criminal Konrad Kalejs would be welcome when he arrived in Australia in the coming days, she replies, "Would you expect a situation where any Australian citizen would not be?", an answer which caused much controversy.
- 7 January – Alleged Nazi war criminal Konrad Kalejs returns to Australia, arriving at Tullamarine Airport, Melbourne, and met by a barrage of protesters.
- 8 January – Queensland Labor Member for Woodridge, Bill D'Arcy resigns from Queensland Parliament due to the controversy caused by the Net Bet scandal.
- 10 January – CASA issues an Airworthiness Directive which grounds all aircraft after being advised the day before that more contaminants had been found in fuel produced at Mobil's Altona refinery in Melbourne.
- 11 January
  - Australia's biggest ecstasy haul is discovered in Brisbane and seven are arrested.
  - Another 83 asylum seekers arrive in Darwin.
  - Australian troops return home from East Timor.
  - A commuter train derails in Hornsby, Sydney.
- 12 January – Leonard Fraser is committed to stand trial over the murder of Rockhampton schoolgirl Keyra Steinhardt.
- 21 January – Former Queensland Labor MP, Bill D'Arcy, is named as the political figure facing child-sex charges. He is committed to the District Court on 49 charges relating to his career as a school teacher.

=== February ===
- 5 February
  - The Woodridge state by-election and Bundamba state by-election are held in Queensland. Labor MP Mike Kaiser wins the seat of Woodridge.
  - Cyclist Peter Cribb is attacked by a gang of up to ten thugs on the Brisbane Riverside Bikeway and suffers severe brain damage as a result, prompting a widespread ongoing police crackdown on gang violence.
- 9 February – A 15–year–old Aboriginal boy, who was imprisoned for 28 days for stealing stationery, commits suicide in a Northern Territory prison, sparking controversy about the mandatory sentencing laws of the Territory and neighbouring Western Australia.
- 16 February – 21–year–old Jamie Wurramara, who stole $23 worth of biscuits on Christmas Day 1999, is sentenced to a year in jail under the Northern Territory's mandatory sentencing laws, prompting a wave of protests around the nation.
- 25 February – The Federal Opposition calls on Aged Care Minister Bronwyn Bishop to resign after revelations she waited four weeks to act on reports that elderly residents of the Riverside Nursing Home were given kerosene baths in an effort to rid them of scabies, a skin rash.
- 29 February – Katherine Knight murders her partner John Price by stabbing him 37 times in Aberdeen, New South Wales. She proceeded to decapitate, skin and cook the victim in a crime that shocked the country.

=== March ===
- 16 March – A nationwide recall of Herron headache tablets is ordered after a Brisbane doctor and his 18–year–old son are hospitalised with strychnine poisoning.
- 18 March – Herron offers a $250,000 reward to try to find out who tampered with its paracetamol products. A 32–year–old Brisbane man is subsequently arrested.
- 20 March – Queensland Premier Peter Beattie announces that State Cabinet has approved a $30 million deal to exclude trawling from 35 percent of the Great Barrier Reef Marine Park and reduce the fish catch from the reef by 15 percent.
- 25 March – Brisbane City Council election - Jim Soorley is elected for a fourth term as Lord Mayor of Brisbane, defeating Liberal candidate Gail Austen.

=== April ===
- 6 April – Train carriages derail at Redfern, Sydney. No passengers are involved.
- 10 April – Prime Minister John Howard reaches agreement with the Northern Territory Chief Minister Denis Burke on mandatory sentencing. In exchange for Commonwealth funding, the Territory's laws will be changed to give diversionary programmes as a substitute for jail time to children accused of minor crimes. Police will have discretion to give children who've committed more serious crimes access to these programmes.
- 27 April – Four elderly people, between the ages of 65 and 88, are hospitalised after catching the potentially fatal Legionnaires' disease at the new Melbourne Aquarium in what became Victoria's worst outbreak of the disease with possible exposure to up to 10,000 people.

=== May ===
- 21 May – The Airport Rail Link opens in Sydney.
- 28 May – 250,000 people walk across the Sydney Harbour Bridge in support of reconciliation with Australia's Aboriginal people.

=== June ===
- 23 June – The Childers Palace Backpackers Hostel fire hostel fire kills 15 people. Robert Paul Long is later sentenced to life imprisonment for lighting the fire which destroyed the Palace Hotel.

=== July ===
- 1 July – Goods and Services Tax introduced.
- 24 July – Five people are killed in the 2000 Marlborough helicopter crash when a rescue helicopter crashes while attempting to land in thick fog at Marlborough, Queensland.

=== August ===
- 10 August – Beginning of the Sydney gang rapes by a group from up to fourteen men.
- 15 August – Queensland Attorney–General Matt Foley announces that the Government has ordered an independent investigation into allegations of widespread electoral rorting within the Queensland Labor Party.
- 17 August – It is announced that the current Queensland Assistant Police Commissioner Bob Atkinson will replace Jim O'Sullivan as Police Commissioner when he retires on 31 October.

=== September ===
- 11–13 September – The World Economic Forum is held in Melbourne. The S11 movement organises protests that overshadow the meeting.
- 15 September – 1 October – Sydney Olympics held & are a massive success. Outgoing International Olympic Committee president Juan Antonio Samaranch regards them as the 'best Olympic Games ever'. The Olympic Games are handed back to their birthplace Athens, Greece from Sydney, Australia. They'll are welcome back home, soon in the next 4 years to host 2004 Summer Olympics

=== October ===
- 10 October – It is revealed that Workplace Relations Minister Peter Reith has incurred almost $50,000 on a taxpayer-funded Telecard for a service he says he hasn't used for years, but which he admits he gave to his son.

=== November ===
- 1 November – Former Queensland Labor MP Bill D'Arcy is found guilty of 18 child sex charges committed while he was a school teacher.
- November – New South Wales suffers its worst floods in 40 years, with 240 cm of rain falling in one week.
- 22 November – Jim Elder resigns as Queensland Deputy Premier, citing allegations of electoral rorting within the Labor Party currently under investigation by the Shepherdson Inquiry.

== Arts and literature ==
- ARIA Music Awards of 2000
- Thea Astley's novel Drylands and Kim Scott's novel Benang are co-winners of the Miles Franklin Award

== Film ==
- 27 June – Star Wars: Episode II – Attack of the Clones begins principal photography at Fox Studios Australia in Sydney.
- 2 October – Queen of the Damned, based on the novel by Anne Rice, begins principal photography in a converted biscuit factory in St Albans, Melbourne.
- Chopper
- The Dish
- Looking for Alibrandi
- The Wog Boy

== Television ==
- 1 January – The Seven Network introduces a new ribbon-style logo to celebrate the 2000 Sydney Olympics, the first one in the network's history not to have the number 7 inside a circle.
- 6 February – Popstars debuts on the Seven Network, becoming the first Australian reality talent show attracting massive ratings and leading to the formation of Bardot, the first Australian act to debut at no.1 on the ARIA charts.
- 23 March – David Fidler, the anchor of Darwin's flagship National Eight News bulletin resigns after admitting he had fabricated claims that he was a member of the Australian Swim Team at the 1968 Mexico Olympics. He had been stood down by the station pending an internal inquiry but admitting the claims were false, Fidler resigns and apologises for misleading the public. Olympic swimmer Dawn Fraser describes Fidler's false claims "as bad as sports people taking drugs." Fidler claims the pretense commenced when a public figure had erroneously introduced him as a former Olympian at a fundraising dinner in 1985.
- 30 April – Hosted by Andrew Denton, the 42nd annual Logie Awards are held in Melbourne where Lisa McCune wins the Gold Logie and Bruce Gyngell is inducted into the Logie Hall of Fame.
- September – The 2000 Sydney Olympics attracts record ratings for the Seven Network, particularly the opening and closing ceremonies along with the network's continuous coverage.

== Sport ==
- 1 January – Carlton defeats Collingwood in a Millennium special pre–season match
- 11 January – NRL announces strict penalties for clubs found guilty of breaching salary caps
- 14 January – Tennis – Mark Philippousis defeats Pete Sampras to win the Colonial Classic Final
  - Grant Hackett wins 800 metres at the Queensland swimming titles.
- 24 February – First day of the Australian Track & Field Championships for the 1999–2000 season, which are held at the Stadium Australia in Sydney. The 10,000 metres was conducted at the Melbourne Grand Prix on 2 March 2000.
- 9 March – Colonial Stadium (now Telstra Dome) plays host to its first game of Australian rules football. Essendon defeats Port Adelaide (24.12.156) to (8.14.62)
- 27 April – In the 2000 Anzac Test Australia defeat New Zealand 52 - 0 at Sydney's Stadium Australia before a crowd of 26,023
- 3 May – Anthony Mundine, after going AWOL from the St George Illawarra Dragons for 10 days, announces his retirement from rugby league and switches to boxing.
- 5 June, Suncorp Stadium – The 2000 State of Origin series is wrapped up by New South Wales in game two of the series against Queensland.
- 11 June – Wollongong Wolves come from 3–0 behind at half-time to defeat Perth Glory and win the NSL Grand Final on penalties after the game finished 3–3. The attendance at Subiaco Oval was 43,242, the record attendance in Australian domestic football history until broken in 2006.
- 15 July – Essendon becomes the first VFL/AFL team to begin a season with nineteen consecutive wins, beating Collingwood's record from 1929.
- 2 August – Essendon becomes the first team to finish with a 21–1 record; a feat subsequently equalled by Geelong in 2008.
- 11 August – The Melbourne Phoenix defeat the Adelaide Thunderbirds 52–51 in the Commonwealth Bank Trophy netball grand final.
- 27 August – Minor premiers the Brisbane Broncos defeat the Sydney Roosters 14–6 at Stadium Australia (now Telstra Stadium) to win the 93rd NSWRL/ARL/NRL premiership. It is the fifth premiership for the Broncos and the last grand final played during the day. The North Queensland Cowboys finish in last position, claiming the wooden spoon.
- 2 September – Essendon (19.21.135) defeats Melbourne (11.9.75) to win the 104th VFL/AFL premiership. It is the last occasion until 2010 that the grand final has been an all-Melbourne affair and the last occasion until 2008 that the grand final has been an all-Victorian affair.
- 7 November – Horse Brew wins the Melbourne Cup.
- 19 November – Garth Tander and Jason Bargwanna win the FAI Bathurst 1000 for Garry Rogers Motorsport, a first for the team and both drivers.
- 2000 Summer Olympics in Sydney, Australia result in a record 58 medals for Australia.
- 2000 Anzac Test

== Births ==
- 12 January – Chelsie Dawber, footballer
- 16 January – Abigail Paduch, judoka
- 31 January – Princess Ibini-Isei, football forward
- 6 February – Erin Cleaver, track and field para athlete
- 25 February – David Fifita, rugby league player
- 30 March – Riley Day, sprinter
- 11 April – Milly Alcock, actress
- 28 April – Ellie Carpenter, footballer
- 30 April - Tommy Talau, rugby league player
- 4 May – Nicholas Hamilton, actor
- 15 May – Jacob Bragg, runner
- 16 May – MelindaJ Barbieri, football midfielder
- 1 July – Emily Hodgson, footballer
- 13 July – Ella Connolly, sprinter
- 15 July – Jarrod Freeman, cricketer
- 8 October - Jason Saab, rugby league player
- 14 October – Oliver Davies, cricketer
- 24 October – Curtis Mead, baseball player
- 2 November – Tess Coady, snowboarder
- 11 November – Aretha Brown, Indigenous youth activist
- 15 November – Todd Murphy, cricketer
- 16 November – Josh Green, basketball player
- 7 December – Bailey Smith, footballer
- 11 December – Emily Whitehead, artistic gymnast

== Deaths ==
- 1 January – Colin Vaughan, 68, Australian-Canadian journalist and activist (b. 1931)
- 5 March – Dame Roma Mitchell, 86, Governor of South Australia (b. 1913)
- 27 March – Sue Wah Chin, 98, entrepreneur (b. 1900)
- 30 March – Michael Pitman, 67, biologist
- 2 April – Bunney Brooke, 80, actor
- 10 April – Mary MacLean Hindmarsh, 78, botanist
- 21 May – Dulcie Holland, 87, composer and music educator
- 1 June – Sir Raymond Ferrall, 94, businessman, author and cricketer
- 14 June – Greg Wilton, 44, ALP politician, only serving member of the House of Representatives to have committed suicide
- 19 June – Ron Casey, 72, Australian rules footballer and television commentator
- 3 July – Vivian Bullwinkel, 84, army nurse
- 14 July – Mark Oliphant, 98, physicist
- 7 September – Bruce Gyngell, 71, television personality
- 19 October – Charles Perkins, 64, Aboriginal activist
- 1 December – Doug Waterhouse, 84, entomologist
- 26 December – John McLeay, 78, Liberal politician

== See also ==
- 2000 in Australian literature
- 2000 in Australian television
- List of Australian films of 2000
