= The 10:30 Slot =

Australian TV show

The 10.30 Slot was a music and variety show that aired on ABC TV on Friday nights between 1999 and 2000, which was hosted by Dylan Lewis and Angus Sampson. It was similar in format to Lewis and Sampson's previous show, Recovery, although The 10.30 Slot's late-night timeslot allowed for more adult-oriented content, compared to Recovery's youth-based focus. Ironically the program often did not start at 10:30pm as the title would suggest, but the time of its airing was contingent on the late edition of ABC News and other ABC broadcasting priorities on a particular Friday night.

After the series ended Lewis presented Pepsi Live from 2001. Sampson was later a performer and series winner on the improvised comedy show, Thank God You're Here.

== See also ==
- List of Australian music television shows
