= Michael Laffy =

Australian rules footballer

Personal information
- Full name: Michael Laffy
- Born: 16 October 1967 (age 59); Melbourne, Victoria
- Original team: Mount Waverley
- Height: 194 cm (6 ft 4 in)
- Weight: 95 kg (209 lb)
- Position: Defender

Playing career^{1}
Years	Club	Games (Goals)
1987–1990	Richmond	26 (0)
- ^{1} Playing statistics correct to the end of 1990.

Michael Laffy (born 16 October 1967) is a former Australian rules footballer with the Richmond Football Club, and was also a contestant on the second season of the Australian version of The Mole where he was revealed as The Mole.

== Playing career ==
Michael Laffy played only 26 AFL/VFL games in an injury-marred career, mainly as a defender.

== The Mole ==
A decade after his retirement from the AFL, Laffy applied to be a contestant on the second season of the Australian version of The Mole. At the time, his main occupation was a builder, whilst he was also known as a former AFL player.

Laffy was revealed as The Mole at the end of the series; he committed over ten sabotages during the series.

== See also ==
- List of Richmond Football Club players
- The Mole (Australian season 2)
