= Scenestar =

Scenestar was a not-for-profit organisation promoting underage events in Melbourne, Australia between 1995 and 1997. The organisation was run by teenagers Aaron Shipperlee and Pheona Donohoe, assisted by a team of volunteers at shows. Scenestar organised events at the Corner Hotel and Central Club Hotel in Richmond.

== History ==
Aaron Shipperlee met Pheona Donohoe at The Venue in Noble Park. Donohoe was a member of the City of Greater Dandenong Muso Network, booked many of the alternative bands at The Venue, and was involved in the Decimus Gnu compilation CD. Scenestar embraced the DIY ethic by not conforming to government-funded youth entertainment programs provided by The Push. Door prices were kept to a minimum and often equated to $1 per band. Events featured underground bands and frequently included all-girl bands from Rock’N’Roll High School. Scenestar was regularly promoted in local street press, newspapers, magazines and community radio. A feature article was included in the September 1995 issue of the Australian Rolling Stone magazine.

== Fanzines ==
Scenestar's main promotional tool of fanzines was inspired by the Manic! Crew newsletters. Shipperlee's Nappy Kill fanzine was available via mail-order and at alternative record stores, while Donohoe's Swirl was mailed to the 1,000 plus members on the Scenestar mailing list. Printing and postage costs were subsidised through advertising arrangements with local record labels and often included free marketing material such as samplers from Flying Nun, Rapido, Brass Companion and Murmur.

== Other Publicity ==
Donohoe presented a weekly all-ages gig report on the PBS-FM Thursday drive program in order to promote the Scenestar events. She later presented the Australian music show on the station between 2000–2003 and was the station's Music and Promotions Manager in 2000–2002. Scenestar was also featured on one of the first episodes of the ABC TV program Recovery in 1996. Donohoe later joined the show as their all-ages scene presenter between 1997 and 1999.

== List of Events ==
There were 33 official Scenestar events

- Saturday 1 April 1995 with Meanies, Warped, Snout, Daisygrinders, Muffcake (*)
- Saturday 29 April 1995 with Front End Loader, Screamfeeder, Sidewinder, Midget, Gudgeon (*)
- Saturday 13 May 1995 with You Am I, Bodyjar, Snout, Automatic, Something For Kate (*)
- Saturday 24 June 1995 with Frenzal Rhomb, Providence, Kilfinnan, Salmonella, Muffcake
- Saturday 1 July 1995 with Bodyjar, One Inch Punch, Caustic Soda
- Saturday 8 July 1995 with TISM, Trout Fishing In Quebec, Incursion, Warped, Salmonella
- Saturday 22 July 1995 with Incursion, Spudgun, Sandpit, Kitty Cat Harness, Stick Figure, Tuff Muff
- Saturday 5 August 1995 with Fridge, Muffcake, Something For Kate, Food, Quadbox, Buttjuice
- Saturday 19 August 1995 with The Meanies, Nunchucka Superfly, Midget, Spudgun, Hardware
- Saturday 2 September 1995 with Christbait, Regurgitator, Lawnsmell, Gerling, Hecate, Midget Stooges, Plunge
- Saturday 9 September 1995 with Incursion, Fur, Dioline, Drop City, Something For Kate
- Saturday 16 September 1995 with Channel Zero, Downtime, Superheist, Alchemist, Tuff Muff, Haite
- Saturday 30 September 1995 with Something For Kate, Kilfinnan, Salmonella, Quadbox, Pyroherra, Stick Figure, Caffeine, Judge Jumby, Day Break
- Saturday 7 October 1995 with Bodyjar, Incursion, Sidewinder, Toe To Toe, Something For Kate, Caustic Soda, Spdfgh
- Saturday 14 October 1995 with Spiderbait, Incursion, Ricaine, Salmonella, Tuff Muff, Miffy, Resistica
- Saturday 28 October 1995 with Powderfinger, Fur, Sidewinder, Zambian Goat Herders, Sandpit, Something For Kate
- Saturday 13 January 1996 with Muffcake, Headcase, Buttjuice, Kilfinnan, Golden Lifestyle Band, Quadbox
- Saturday 17 February 1996 with Magic Dirt, Frenzal Rhomb, Spdfgh, Hurter (*)
- Saturday 2 March 1996 with Ricaine, Something For Kate, Warped, Kilfinnan, Paintstripper, Steel Worker
- Saturday 16 March 1996 with No Fun At All, Millencolin, One Inch Punch, Blitz Babies, Wrong Body, Crettins Puddle
- Saturday 6 April 1996 with Incursion, Warped, Sandpit, Golden Lifestyle Band, Hurter, Living End
- Saturday 11 May 1996 with Frenzal Rhomb, Lawnsmell, Muffcake, Kilfinnan, Crettins Puddle, No Comply
- Saturday 1 June 1996 with Ricaine, Budd, Midget, Tweezer
- Saturday 8 June 1996 with Bodyjar, Porkers, Muffcake, Fallout
- Saturday 15 June 1996 with Something For Kate, Tweezer, Golden Lifestyle Band, Even, Valve
- Saturday 29 June 1996 with Nitocris, Salmonella, Kilfinnan, Crettins Puddle, Caffeine
- Saturday 6 July 1996 with Automatic, Muffcake, Quadbox, Nancy Vandal, Humbug, Bobbits
- Saturday 20 July 1996 with Spdfgh, Budd, Warped, Sneaker, Hardware, Sin Dog Jelly Roll, Numbskulls, Abode

(*) Events held at The Corner Hotel, Richmond. All other events were held at The Central Club, Richmond.
