= The Mole (Australian TV series) season 2 =

The Mole
- Season 2
- No. of episodes: 10

Release
- Original network: Seven Network
- Original release: 21 February – 25 April 2001

Season chronology
- ← Previous; Season 1 Next → Season 3

The second season of the Australian version of The Mole originally aired from 21 February 2001 to 25 April 2001. It took place in Victoria and was hosted by Grant Bowler.

== Details ==
Unlike other seasons of The Mole, this season began with sixteen players, who were whittled down to ten in a qualification round, which was referred to as the "last step" in the audition process.

The maximum prize amount in this season was $200,000. Filming took place throughout November and December in late 2000. More than 5,000 people auditioned to be on the show.

| Player | Age | Hometown | Occupation | Outcome |
|---|---|---|---|---|
| Christopher "Chris" Zeiher | 26 | South Australia | Retail Manager | 15th-10th place |
| Mike Shepherd | 61 | Queensland | Student | 15th-10th place |
| Terri Sharp | 39 | Western Australia | Pharmacy Assistant | 15th-10th place |
| Michael Brown | N/A | | | 15th-10th place |
| Natalie McCay | N/A | | | 15th-10th place |
| Jessica Hardy | 23 | New South Wales | Receptionist | 15th-10th place |
| Helen Nation | 54 | New South Wales | Opal Miner | 9th Place |
| John Edwards | 50 | New South Wales | Plumber | 8th Place |
| Angela Linforth | 31 | Western Australia | Beauty Therapist | 7th Place |
| Fiona White-Hartig | 29 | Western Australia | Care Worker | 6th Place |
| Shane Jolley | 27 | Victoria | Advertising Executive | 5th Place |
| Emily Fitzsimmons | 19 | Cronulla, New South Wales | Student | 4th Place |
| Mal Granturco | 38 | Blacktown, New South Wales | Warehouse Supervisor | 3rd Place |
| Hal Pritchard | 31 | Berowra Heights, New South Wales | Shop Owner | Runner-up |
| Michael Laffy | 33 | Hawksburn, Victoria | Former AFL Player/Builder | The Mole |
| Brooke Marshall | 24 | East Bentleigh, Victoria | Former Bar Manager | Winner |

*Neither Michael B.'s nor Natalie's information were given

=== Further Appearances ===
Jessica Hardy, who was eliminated in the qualifying mission on The Mole would later be a housemate on Big Brother Australia 2002.

=== Elimination chart ===
Elimination Chart
| Player | Pre | 1 | 2 | 3 | 4 | 5 | 6 | 7 | 8 & 9 |
|---|---|---|---|---|---|---|---|---|---|
| Brooke | IN | IN | IN | IN | IN | IN | IN | IN | WINNER |
| Michael L. | IN | IN | IN | IN | IN | IN | IN | IN | MOLE |
| Hal | IN | IN | IN | IN | IN | IN | IN | IN | RUNNER-UP |
| Mal | IN | IN | IN | IN | IN | IN | IN | OUT | |
| Emily | IN | IN | IN | IN | IN | IN | OUT | | |
| Shane | IN | IN | IN | IN | IN | OUT | | | |
| Fiona | IN | IN | IN | IN | OUT | | | | |
| Angela | IN | IN | IN | OUT | | | | | |
| John | IN | IN | OUT | | | | | | |
| Helen | IN | OUT | | | | | | | |
| Jessica | OUT | | | | | | | | |
| Natalie | OUT | | | | | | | | |
| Michael B. | OUT | | | | | | | | |
| Terri | OUT | | | | | | | | |
| Mike | OUT | | | | | | | | |
| Chris | OUT | | | | | | | | |

Indicates the player won the game
Indicates the player was the mole
Indicates the player won a free pass
Indicates the player scored the lowest on the quiz and was eliminated

== Episodes ==
=== Episode 1 ===
Episode 1 recap
Location: Victoria, Australia
| Assignment | Groups | Successful Groups |
|---|---|---|
| Hotel Huntdown (Qualification Mission) | 4 | 4 |
Qualification Elimination
| Chris, Mike, Terri, Michael B., Natalie, and Jessica | The 6 players who did not qualify. | |
| Assignment | Money earned | Possible earnings |
| Assault Course | $10,000 | $10,000 |
| **Current Kitty** | **$10,000** | **$10,000** |

Hotel Huntdown (Qualification Mission): The players were split into four teams of four and started in Brisbane, Sydney, Canberra, and Hobart. The groups' assignment was to get to a Rydges Hotel in Melbourne by 4:00 P.M. They were given $500 each and were told not to use more than the budget. They were also required to use at least five methods of transportation, and each must take them at least 1 kilometre. If the players broke any of the rules or failed to make it to the hotel, the entire group was eliminated. All four quartets made it to the hotel in time.

Qualification Elimination: During the first assignment, the players were given dossier cards about the players not in their group and were encouraged to try to find out the same information from their teammates. Once at the hotel, players took a computer test based on general knowledge about all sixteen people. The top ten scorers advanced to the main part of the game.

Assault Course: The ten players who survived the first elimination were flown by helicopter to HMAS Cerberus and told to complete a Naval training assault course for a $10,000 reward. There were nine obstacles on the course, which would take a fit person 20 minutes to complete. The group was given 40 minutes for all of them to complete it. For each obstacle they refused or failed, they would lose two minutes off the time limit. Though they inadvertently ran around one obstacle and had to double back on it, they completed the course in time and won the money.

=== Episode 2 ===
Episode 2 recap
Location: Victoria, Australia
| Assignment | Money earned | Possible earnings |
|---|---|---|
| Tour Guides | $5,000 | $5,000 |
| Time Bomb | $0 | $10,000 |
| Underwater Keys | $0 | $5,000 |
| **Current Kitty** | **$15,000** | **$30,000** |
Free passes
| Shane | Retrieved a key opening a red box in the "Underwater Keys" assignment | |
Elimination
| Helen | 1st player eliminated | |

Tour Guides: Immediately after the Assault Course, the group selected Fiona and Shane as the two players who they thought were most handy at spinning a yarn. The two of them were taken to Melbourne, given the assignment of posing as guides on a tour bus, and lying to 26 strangers. They had to tell two boldfaced lies and be believed, and tell two jokes, getting a laugh from each. Shane tried to lie first, but told an unbelievable, absurd, and overly detailed story. Fiona then managed to tell outrageous lies that were counted. Shane next tried a joke, but since he asked the tourists to laugh, it was disallowed. They then each managed to tell a joke that got at least someone in their group to laugh. At the end of the trip, each tourist was presented a survey form, and to win the $5,000, each of them had to grade Fiona and Shane's job as tour guides either "excellent" or "very good." They received nine "very good" and seventeen "excellent" ratings, winning the money.

Time Bomb: The other eight players were taken to Fort Nepean, a mostly inactive military fort with many tunnels, gun emplacements, ammunition stores, lookout points, and bunkers. One bunker contained a time bomb. The host told the players to pick two of them who were comfortable in confined spaces. These two were John and Michael, who were put into the bunker with the time bomb and told that to defuse it, they must cut four differently coloured wires in the correct sequence. The other six split up to look for four brainteaser puzzles placed at the fort. The correct answer to each corresponded to a colour, which they were to give to John and Michael. If they solved all four puzzles, they would have the correct wires and the bomb could be defused, adding $10,000 to the kitty. The others all found their puzzles and retrieved a coloured disc corresponding to the correct wire to cut, but Hal and Helen never found theirs and simply picked a piece of coloured wire up off the ground, thinking it was what they were sent to find. John and Michael ultimately cut orange, pink, purple and yellow wires in succession, and the timer did not stop. An explosion of smoke signified their failure. Afterward, the host informed them that the answer was in front of John and Michael the whole time - the manufacturer name on the bomb canister was PYRO Explosives, Inc., referring to pink, yellow, red, and orange wires in succession.

Underwater Keys: The group was told to select someone to have a chance at a free pass through to the next episode. On a random draw, Shane was selected. On a pier, there were four blue lockers and six red ones stacked. If Shane dived underwater and retrieved a key that opened a red locker, he will win the free pass. If they key opened a blue locker, the group will win $5,000. Ten keys were thrown into the water near the pier, and one at a time, the members of the team were given the opportunity to retrieve one key apiece to try to open the red lockers, reducing the odds of Shane retrieving a key to open one of them. Shane could only dive for his key when the other nine decided it was time. Helen, Brooke, Michael, Mal, and John dived before Shane and retrieved four keys, opening red lockers and one opening a blue, meaning Shane had two chances to win a free pass and three to add $5,000 to the kitty. Despite the odds being against him, Shane retrieved a key that opened a red locker, meaning no money was won and he got the free pass.

=== Episode 3 ===
Episode 3 recap
Location: Victoria, Australia
| Assignment | Money earned | Possible earnings |
|---|---|---|
| Night Maze | $0 | $10,000 |
| Fugitive Pursuit | $10,000 | $10,000 |
| Mannequin Dress-Up | $0 | $5,000 |
| **Current Kitty** | **$25,000** | **$55,000** |
Free passes
| — | Brooke failed to evade the others in the "Fugitive Pursuit" assignment | |
Elimination
| John | 2nd player eliminated | |

Night Maze: Immediately after the previous episode's elimination, the remaining nine players were taken to a colossal hedge maze in the dead of night. A crane was rigged with military-caliber night vision cameras 50 meters above the maze, to give a bird's-eye view. The players divided themselves into three groups of three, with one player running in the maze and the other two guiding them. Amid three opportunities in the maze, the players had to retrieve two of four light beacons while evading a hunter, all easily visible from the crane camera. Michael ran first but was tagged by the hunter while carrying a beacon, putting it out of play. Shane then ran and retrieved a beacon. The last runner was Hal, who got to a beacon, but was tagged before he could exit the maze, meaning the assignment was lost.

Fugitive Pursuit: The players met for breakfast, and on the table was a sealed note instructing whoever picked it up to immediately leave for an assignment. This was Brooke, who was told to drive to downtown Melbourne to act as a fugitive from her teammates. She had to carry a limbless mannequin with her at all times, stay within the shaded area on a map she was provided, and she was told not to enter any buildings. The others, upon finishing their breakfast, were told to select four players to chase her. These were Fiona, Hal, John, and Michael, and they were taken to Melbourne and told to find her, for $10,000. If Brooke evaded detection from the others for one hour, she would win a free pass through to the next episode and the others would not win money. There was one twist - the players in pursuit of Brooke were given two-way radios to communicate with each other, but what they did not know was that Brooke had one as well, and she could hear everything they were saying. The pursuers had to follow the traffic rules at all times, whilst Brooke did not have to. Nonetheless, the others found her after about 45 minutes, winning the money and denying her a free pass.

Mannequin Dress-Up: The other four, Angela, Emily, Mal, and Shane, were split into duos with Angela and Shane heading off to a different location while Emily and Mal were given the players' luggage and told to select for each player a complete outfit, with five items of clothing. Later on, Angela and Shane were presented with nine mannequins, each corresponding to a member of the team, and told to dress them with the clothes Emily and Mal had selected. They were allowed to make ten mistakes. All nine players later reunited to inspect their own mannequins and tell what clothes were not theirs. If Angela and Shane made ten or fewer mistakes, $5,000 would be won, but they wound up making eleven, including putting four or six articles of clothing on certain mannequins, putting men's clothing on mannequins representing women, and not noticing that the socks they put on Hal actually had John's name on them.

=== Episode 4 ===
Episode 4 recap
Location: Victoria, Australia
| Assignment | Money earned | Possible earnings |
|---|---|---|
| Hostage Rescue | $0 | $10,000 |
| Predictions | $5,000 | $15,000 |
| Robbery Game | $10,000 | $10,000 |
| **Current Kitty** | **$40,000** | **$90,000** |
Free passes
| — | Fiona failed to identify the thief in the Robbery Game | |
Elimination
| Angela | 3rd player eliminated | |

Hostage Rescue: The host met the players at their breakfast table and asked for two players who were good at reading maps. The group chose Mal and Michael, who were taken away to be hostages that the others would have to rescue. They were blindfolded and taken to a wine cellar somewhere in the wine country of Victoria's Yarra Valley. They only clue they had to their whereabouts was a map, but the map was only physical - it had no names of towns or roads. The added twist was that the map was upside-down as Mal and Michael looked at it. They were able to contact the other six, who were divided into two groups of three and had been taken, themselves blindfolded, to two undisclosed locations for their starting points in the assignment. One of the groups was to travel by air in a helicopter to get to Mal and Michael's location and the other by car. Michael discerned that the map was upside-down, and they eventually figured out where they were, but the car team did not arrive to Mal and Michael within the assignment's one hour time limit, so the $10,000 on offer was not won.

Predictions: After selecting Hal and Mal as the group's two most competitive players, the other six were paired up to play sports against one another (fencing, croquet, and canoeing), with the loser having to serve the winner dinner that night. Unbeknownst to them, Hal and Mal's assignment was to watch them and predict the outcomes of each game. They had to pick two winners out of three to win the money. They selected Brooke to defeat Emily in fencing, Michael to defeat Shane in canoeing, and Fiona to defeat Angela in croquet. Michael indeed defeated Shane, and Brooke won her sport as well, so the $5,000 was won. The host then offered Hal and Mal double or nothing on the outcome of the croquet game, which they had said was the hardest to predict. They passed, deciding to keep the $5,000 safe, and the host subsequently offered triple or nothing. They passed again, and Angela wound up winning the croquet match, so their decision was the correct one.

Robbery Game: After dinner, the host asked for the player who would make the best police officer. The group chose Fiona, who was given some training by a private investigator. The next afternoon, at a party, the other seven were to try to commit the perfect crime, and steal an object of value, placed in plain sight during the party. After they had done so, Fiona was brought in to act as a police detective and try to find out which of her teammates had, or at one time handled, the object. If she guessed right, she would win a free pass through to the next episode, but if she guessed wrong, the group would win $10,000. The group's diversionary tactic to gather in front of the object, which had been placed on a mantle, and stay there for several moments as the party's twenty genuine guests took photos of them. After they dispersed, the host announced to everyone that a crime had been committed and a police detective was on the way. Fiona viewed footage of the party and interviewed several of her suspects, eventually accusing Mal. What the seven players did not know was that the object had been treated with a powder that was only visible under ultraviolet light, and if any of them had touched it, their hands would show the powder under that light. Mal put his hands under the light, but they had no powder on them, so the $10,000 was won. The heist had been achieved by Emily grabbing the object off the mantle, as she hid behind the group's two physically largest members Mal and Michael and slipping it into Shane's trouser pocket without him touching it.

=== Episode 5 ===
Episode 5 recap
Location: Victoria, Australia
| Assignment | Money earned | Possible earnings |
|---|---|---|
| Sovereign Hill | $0 | $5,000 |
| Search & Rescue | $0 | $10,000 |
| Art Test | $10,000 | $10,000 |
| **Current Kitty** | **$50,000** | **$115,000** |
Free passes
| Mal | Evaded identification from the others in the "Sovereign Hill" assignment | |
Elimination
| Fiona | 4th player eliminated | |

Sovereign Hill: The players were taken to the gold rush town of Sovereign Hill and told to select the one among them who would most enjoy dressing up in period costume. Mal was chosen, and he was told to disguise himself in such a way that the players would not be able to recognize him. He had all the costumes and makeup from Sovereign Hill at his disposal. Mal arranged to have as many people as possible around him, and discovered an actor on site that greatly resembled him. He lent the actor some of his jewellery and shaved off his distinctive goatee to try to complete the misdirection. The others had five minutes to gaze out from a height upon the main square in Sovereign Hill, where they were told Mal was hiding. If they found him, they would add $5,000 to the kitty, but if they chose someone thinking it was Mal and it was not, or ran out of time, they would win nothing, and Mal would win a free pass through to the next episode. The players thought they had found him just as their time ran out, but they were incorrect in their guess. Mal had in fact not dressed in period costume at all - he had posed as a cameraman.

Search and Rescue: Immediately after the previous assignment, Hal and Shane were chosen as two people who would like to spend the night together. They were taken into the wilderness of Grampians National Park, to a gully deep inside a gorge, left there to be rescued by the other five players. If they were found within two and a half hours of the assignment's beginning, the group would win $10,000, but if they were not, Hal and Shane really would spend the night together, outdoors with nothing. The others were brought to the park sometime later and given all the resources that would be available to park rangers on search and rescue missions. Their plan was for Fiona to search the area in a helicopter and guide the others by radio to Hal and Shane's car. Brooke and Michael came very close to Hal and Shane, such that they should have been able to hear Hal and Shane shouting for them, but they did not find them within the time limit, so no money was won, and Hal and Shane were forced to rough it for a night.

Art Test: The next morning, the seven players were reunited, and they were told to pick two players with creativity and artistic flair. These were Brooke and Fiona, who were taken to an art gallery and given access to supplies and a studio in order to create their own work of modern art. Once finished, their piece would be installed in the gallery. A member of the public was then to be brought into the gallery to try to pick out the amateur work, and if Brooke and Fiona managed to fool this member of the public, they would win $5,000. The member of the public picked out a professionally designed piece, and the money was won. Brooke and Fiona then had the chance to earn another $5,000 if their five teammates could correctly identify their piece. This part of the assignment was also won.

=== Episode 6 ===
Episode 6 recap
Location: Victoria, Australia
| Assignment | Money earned | Possible earnings |
|---|---|---|
| Fortress Test | $0 | $10,000 |
| Naughts and Crosses | $5,000 | $5,000 |
| Extortion | $10,000 | $10,000 |
| **Current Kitty** | **$65,000** | **$140,000** |
Free passes
| — | Hal and Michael failed to evade detection from the others in the "Extortion" assignment | |
Elimination
| Shane | 5th player eliminated | |

Fortress Test: The players drove out to an isolated homestead in the countryside and told to fortify it in an attempt to protect a large glass bowl full of water. They were told a group of attackers would come sometime that night and try to destroy the bowl. If they could protect it until 2:00 AM the next morning, they would win $10,000. They were given tools to fortify the doors and windows of the homestead, paintball guns to tag and eliminate their attackers, bodily protective gear, night vision goggles, radios, a searchlight, and the help of a professional armourer. They were not told how many attackers they would face. Brooke patrolled the front of the homestead, with Michael in the rear, Mal the last line of defence in front of the bowl itself, and Hal, Shane, and Emily as snipers in the home's second storey. After a couple of bluffs earlier in the evening, the attackers struck for real at midnight, and broke in through the rear of the house, easily overwhelming Mal on the inside and destroying the bowl. They had planted time-delay flash bombs out front, which drew the players' attention to the wrong area.

Naughts and Crosses: The players were taken to a farm in Smeaton the next day to compete against a farmer in a game of naughts and crosses, played with live sheep, which had red X's and green O's spray-painted on them. If they could beat the farmer within one hour, they would win $5,000, but if the farmer won a game first or time ran out without anyone winning a game, they would miss out on the money. The RSPCA Australia was on hand to ensure the sheep were not mistreated, and if the players mishandled a sheep, such as by grabbing it by the legs, the game would immediately be over and they would be penalized $5,000. After one draw game, the players outmaneuvered the farmer and won the $5,000.

Extortion: The group chose Hal and Michael as the two among them who are fierce negotiators. The two of them were given a briefcase, as was the group of four. The assignment, for $10,000, was for them to swap briefcases, but if Hal and Michael could avoid being photographed by the other four before the swap took place, they would both win a free pass through to the next episode. The exchange was to take place at Ballarat town hall. Both groups had mobile phones, and Michael directed the group to come to Ballarat town hall and wait at the cashier's desk, where they could see them enter on surveillance cameras. The group of four had, in their efforts to deny Hal and Michael the free pass, brought a similar-looking case with them to substitute for the case they were given. They saw the security cameras inside Ballarat town hall and figured out that they were being watched. After an employee directed the four to the security area of the town hall, Shane photographed Hal and Michael to deny the free passes. But the players needed only to exchange briefcases to win the $10,000, so the group of four hurriedly retrieved their real briefcase from where they had stashed it, and narrowly managed to swap inside the time limit.

=== Episode 7 ===
Episode 7 recap
Location: Victoria, Australia
| Assignment | Money earned | Possible earnings |
|---|---|---|
| Sniper Test | $0 | $10,000 |
| Blacked-Out Driving Test | $0 | $10,000 |
| Cheating Temptation | -$5,000 | $25,000 |
| **Current Kitty** | **$60,000** | **$185,000** |
Free passes
| Brooke | Shot Michael to prevent success in the Sniper Test | |
Elimination
| Emily | 6th player eliminated | |

Sniper Test: Immediately following the previous episode's elimination, each remaining player was handed an envelope containing a piece of paper. One was marked, and this was Brooke's. The players were taken to an abandoned town called Paterson's Ridge, and Brooke was locked in the village jail. The assignment for the other four was to rescue her, to make it to the jail, unlock Brooke from her cell, and take her to the railway station where the host was waiting. There were two snipers in the little town, armed with laser guns that, if they shot any player, would eliminate them from the game. At least one player had to be with Brooke at the railway station within one hour to win $10,000. Brooke was given a gun herself and told that if she shot and eliminated whatever compatriots made it with her to the railway station, the group would win nothing, but she would win a free pass through to the next episode. The other players were unarmed but given radios and a map of the village. Mal and Hal were quickly eliminated, but Emily made it to the jail and freed Brooke. Brooke was then able to eliminate one of the snipers, and the three remaining players gathered in a building adjacent to the railway station. Emily sacrificed herself to draw fire away from Michael and Brooke, who arrived safely at the railway station. Brooke then shot Michael to earn her free pass and deny the group any winnings.

Blacked-Out Driving Test: The next day, the players were taken to Clunes, and the entire town was blocked off by police for their presence. A car had had its windows completely blacked out, with a camera mounted on the hood. The assignment was for the three players best at giving directions to watch the feed that that camera gave and guide the player most recently licensed to drive, Emily, through the town-to-town hall where the odd man out, Hal, was waiting. If she was able to pick Hal up and drive the car back to its starting point within thirty minutes, while making no more than four driving mistakes, the group would win $10,000. Emily made two mistakes almost immediately after beginning (failure to look behind and failure to indicate), and two more right as she reached Hal (driving off the road and reversing without looking behind). She made it back to the start point in time, but on the way, she drove on the wrong side of the road, so the assignment was lost.

Cheating Temptation: Each player was called for an interview, during which the host left to apparently attend to a production matter. He left behind a fake production notebook, and though it seemed the cameras all left the room with the host, a small spy cam stayed behind to see if the players took the bait (they would signed contracts promising not to cheat in their time on the show, which specifically included reading production paperwork). Each player that resisted the temptation would win $5,000 for the kitty, but each one that succumbed to that temptation would cost the group $5,000 from the kitty. Only Brooke and Michael kept themselves from looking, so $5,000 was lost.

=== Episode 8 ===
Episode 8 recap
| Assignment | Money earned | Possible earnings |
|---|---|---|
| Two-Up Dares | $20,000 | $20,000 |
| Hitchcock Hotel | $0 | $10,000 |
| Quad Puzzle | $10,000 | $10,000 |
| **Current Kitty** | **$90,000** | **$225,000** |
Elimination
| Mal | 7th player eliminated | |

Two-Up Dares: In Geelong, players were each required to complete one of four tasks. The game of Two-up determined their tasks. Heads was the easier task, and tails the harder task, as well as the more stressful. One-by-one, the players were asked to choose and envelope. Then, they threw the coins into the air. Whatever the coins landed on determined the task. All four players had to complete their tasks to win. The tasks were:

1A. Heads - Paint your face
1B. Tails - Paint your entire body (Michael)

2A. Heads - Dye your hair (Hal)
2B. Tails - Shave your entire head

3A. Heads - Pierce your eyebrow (Mal)
3B. Tails - Get a permanent tattoo

4. The Trio Task (Brooke: 1A, 2A, and 3A)

Brooke, Hal, and Michael completed their tasks without hesitating. However, Mal was reluctant as he is afraid of needles. Nevertheless, he completed his task too, and the money was won.

Hitchcock Hotel: The players were locked into 4 different rooms and had to escape with a name (Alfred Hitchcock). Inside each room was a safe and a mobile phone with each of the player's numbers on it. Also in the rooms were different clues - an exercise bicycle in Michael's room, a video tape inside a VCR in Mal's, a safe combination on a shower screen in Brooke's, and pieces of paper with writing in Hal's. Hal's room was completely void of light, yet that room contained the keys to open that room's door. If the players figured out the name and escape on time, they would win. They easily discerned the name they were supposed to give the host upon escaping (the clues that led to their escape centered around Hitchcock films, and every room in the hotel was named for a Hitchcock film) but were a few minutes outside of their hour time limit in getting out, so nothing was won.

Quad Puzzle: The players were split into 3 groups: a timekeeper (Brooke), two flag retrievers (Hal and Michael), and a time replenisher (Mal). The flag retrievers' job was to cross a ravine using 2 boards and the stools on the ravine to make it to the flags. They must also make it back to the other side in time. The timekeeper was to watch the timer, which was a liquid dispenser filled with blue-dyed water. If the water ceased to flow, the assignment was over. The time replenisher's job was to ride a quad bike through the forest until he reached some jugs. The jugs varied in amounts of water, and only one jug was allowed to be brought back per trip. If the flag retrievers made it to the other side before time is up, the players would win $10,000. Despite the fact that Mal brought back the smallest jugs he could have taken, Hal and Michael narrowly made it to the flags and back in time, winning the money.

=== Episode 9 ===
Episode 9 recap
| Mission | Money earned | Possible earnings |
|---|---|---|
| Wingover Aeroplane | $5,000 | $5,000 |
| Kayak Travelling | $10,000 | $10,000 |
| Three Questions | -$5,000 | $15,000 |
| **Final Kitty** | **$100,000** | **$255,000** |
Reveal
| Hal | The Runner-Up | |
| Brooke | The Winner | |
| Michael | The Mole | |

Wingover Aeroplane: Each of the players was to take the controls of a plane, and perform a manoeuvre called a wingover. However, only the first person was taught by an instructor, Hal. The other two were to be taught by the person before, Michael then Brooke in succession. All three had to perform the stunt and be passed by the instructor. If the plane went out of control, the instructor took over and the assignment was lost. Hal performed well by the instructor's standards, and so did Michael. Brooke was frightened to even attempt the assignment, but the instructor passed her attempt as well, so the money was won. Ironically, Brooke performed the wingover better than Hal or Michael.

Kayak Travelling: The players were to travel 12 kilometres by kayak, which was paddled behind a speedboat, within three hours. One player was to be in the kayak at all times, and the players were allowed to switch off. It would take an experienced kayaker two hours to make the journey. Of the three, only Michael had any real experience in deep-water kayaking, but they managed to make it to their final destination in Queenscliff in time.

Three Questions: The last assignment took place at Fort Queenscliff, just across the water from Fort Nepean, the site of one of their first assignments. One at a time, each player was sequestered within the fort and given three questions to answer. These questions were all about morals and honesty, with the answers being the other two players, questions such as "Who is more likely to return change to a shopkeeper - Michael or Brooke?" The task for the other two players was finding the third, based on their predicted answers to the questions. Each question took them on a path to a door somewhere on the site, and no routes overlapped, so they would only reach the sequestered player at the end of their path if they answered all three questions correctly. For each player that was found, $5,000 would be won for the kitty, but if they were not found, $5,000 would be lost from the kitty. Hal was found in the first round, but Michael and Brooke were not, so there was a net loss of $5,000 for the assignment.

The final computer test took place on a train. Brooke, Hal, and Michael were each locked into a compartment, and when the train stopped, the host unlocked one door, the winner's door. Brooke emerged as the winner of $100,000. The host then told her to unlock the Mole's door, and she opened Michael's compartment, unmasking him as the Mole.

=== The Mole: How You Could Have Known ===
The following week, a full episode was devoted to the reunion of the players. As had been in the case in the first season, only the final three players knew which of them was the Mole and which the winner of the group kitty when they all met up to watch the previous episode on TV. It was also revealed who each eliminated contestant suspected was the Mole at the time of their elimination:

- Helen thought Mal was the Mole.
- John thought Fiona was the Mole.
- Angela suspected Michael prior to her elimination but changed her mind. (Whom she chose afterwards is never revealed)
- Fiona thought Hal was the Mole.
- Shane thought Brooke was the Mole.
- Emily also thought Brooke was the Mole.
- Mal knew that Michael was the Mole, but he did not have strong enough information going into that computer test.

It was revealed that after the Robbery Game in episode 4, Emily, Hal, and Shane had entered into an agreement that if one of them won the group kitty, $20,000 would be given to each of the other two, as long as none of them was the Mole. Emily and Shane had five months to wait to find out that they had lost out on the money along with Hal. It was also revealed that when Fiona went home after her elimination, she discovered that she had been pregnant while she was on the show. Hal and Brooke both knew the Mole was Michael at the end, but Brooke had been on to him almost from the beginning, whereas Hal only suspected Michael after Shane and Emily were eliminated.

==== Mole Activity ====
===== Sabotage =====
The following acts of sabotage were revealed in the final episode:

Assault Course: Michael pretended to fumble with his harness after the zip line into the course, and also slipped out the words "Go around" as the ten of them were running that got everyone to skip an obstacle. The group still won this assignment, but it gave Michael a sense of what he could do to them.

Time Bomb: Michael purposely overlooked the clue in the bunker that gave him and John the order of wires to cut. John was convinced the solution was somewhere on the timer, so all Michael had to do was keep him from looking at the canisters.

Night Maze: Michael ran around slowly and aimlessly in the maze for a while, and only sped up when he saw the hunter behind him. He made a concerted effort to grab a beacon when it was a certainty that he would be tagged.

Hostage Rescue: Michael tried to look like the hero in this assignment, noticing that the map was upside-down and giving directions for Mal to relay to Brooke in the helicopter. However, Mal made a mistake in what he told her (he said "Hillsview" in place of "Healesville") and Michael did not correct him, even though he knew the area quite well.

Search and Rescue: Michael heard Hal and Shane off to his left whistling and shouting, but he pointed Brooke to the right. When it became clear that he and Brooke were walking the wrong direction, they doubled back, but Michael only stopped when they were next to running water, which made it harder to hear Hal and Shane.

Fortress Test: Michael, a builder, could have easily put much stronger fortification on the homestead. Michael was also the one patrolling the rear of the building, and this is where the attackers entered, without Michael so much as firing a shot.

Blacked-Out Driving Test: Michael subtly encouraged Mal and Brooke to tell Emily to simply back up when she drove off the road, and not first pan the camera back to look behind them.

Hitchcock Hotel: Michael waited over half an hour before he did any cycling on the exercise bike in his room, keeping Hal in pitch darkness for more than half the assignment. Also, although not shown on the final segment, Michael was the last person released from his room, and was slowest in getting out of the hotel, resulting in the assignment being failed.

Kayak Travelling: Michael paddled hard when the boat was in view, but when it was not, he simply stopped altogether.

The following acts of sabotage were spotted during the series, but not mentioned in the final episode:

Naughts and Crosses: Michael pretended to play around with the sheep as he was placing it into the grid, almost instantly costing the assignment.

Sniper Test: Michael was shot just before the end of the Sniper Test, resulting in the loss of $10,000.

Three Questions: Michael purposely answered some questions wrong in regard to Brooke about honesty and morality. This cost another $5,000.

===== Clues =====
The following clues were revealed in the final episode:

The Dossiers: When the players were racing to get to the hotel in Melbourne in time, they stopped to photocopy the dossiers they had been given. Michael's is the one that was shown being photocopied.

Michael's Reactions: Whenever the team won an assignment, Michael would simply stand stone-faced and not clap. Also, when Brooke shot him at the end of the Sniper Test, he told her "Thank you, very much appreciated." What seemed like caustic sarcasm was actually an honest reaction - Brooke had just done his job for him.

Michael's Words: In a confession aired during the final computer test, Michael described his disdain for eliminations not in terms of fear of being eliminated, but only in terms of dreading watching someone else have to leave. This is because Michael knew all along that he was never going to be eliminated.

The following clue can also be spotted during the series, but not mentioned in the final episode:

The First Test: As he is taking a test, Michael says that he “intends to be a part of the show up to the end of the series”. The only way he can be absolutely certain of this intention is if he is "The Mole".
