= Dylan Lewis =

Australian television and radio host (born 1973)

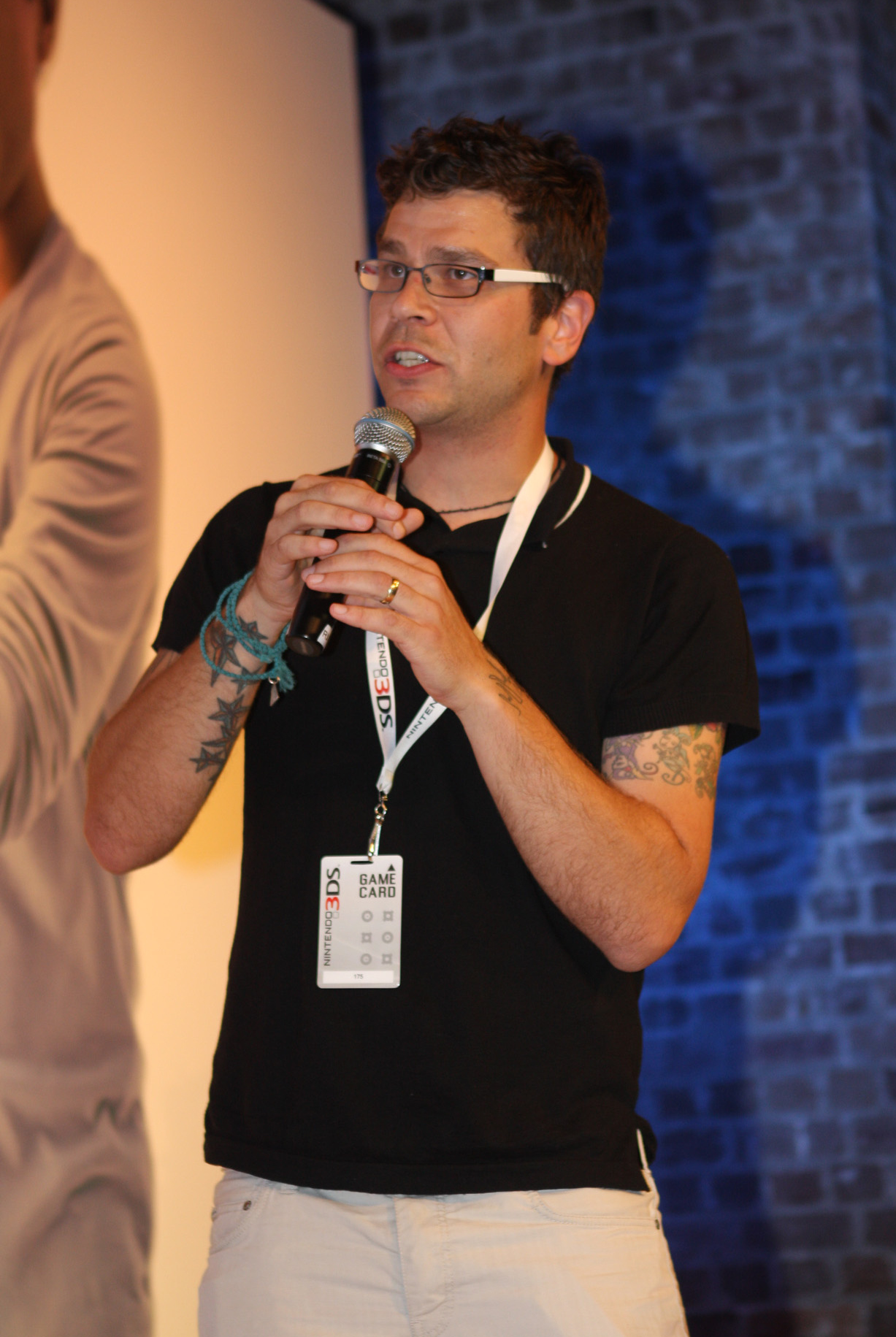
- Born: Dylan Thomas Lewis; 19 February 1973 (age 53); Australia
- Education: University of Melbourne
- Occupations: Television personality; Radio personality
- Years active: 1996–present
- Employers: Australian Broadcasting Corporation; Network 10; Nova Entertainment
- Television: Recovery (1996–2000); Celebrity Big Brother (2002); Video Hits (2010–2011)
- Spouse: Hollie Kennedy
- Children: 2
- Parents: Rowen Lewis; Angela Bannon
- Website: www.dylanlewis.com.au

Dylan Thomas Lewis (born 19 February 1973) is an Australian television and radio host. He is currently the host of Arvo's on Double J. As a musician, he played in funk/alternative rock band The Brown Hornet under the stage name Dirk Vile.

== Early life ==
Lewis was educated at Caulfield Grammar School and graduated in 1990; he then studied a Bachelor of Education in Drama and Music degree at the University of Melbourne. John Bannon, former South Australian premier, was Lewis's stepfather.

== Career ==
=== Television ===
Lewis has undertaken several roles hosting and presenting for numerous Australian music programs; his quick rise to fame started was while he was a host on ABC TV's national Saturday-morning live music show Recovery (from 1996 until the show's run finished in April 2000). The year 2000 saw Lewis presenting a national television program, The 10:30 Slot, and Pepsi Live, a music chart television program.

Lewis won Celebrity Big Brother in 2002 and was a contestant on Celebrity Circus in 2005.

In 2010, he was appointed host of Video Hits on Network Ten. He stayed on the show until its cancellation in mid-2011.

In January 2022, Lewis won the eighth season of I'm a Celebrity...Get Me Out of Here!.

=== Radio ===
In September 2006, Lewis signed with Nova 100 where he was music presenter in mornings for four years then moved to afternoons until November 2012. As of June 2013, he co-hosted the Lewis & Lowe breakfast show on Nova 91.9 in Adelaide with Shane Lowe, later joined by, then replaced by Hayley Pearson as the Dylan & Hayley breakfast show (until 2019). He previously worked as a radio announcer for the Austereo Network and Triple J. He has won three Australian Commercial Radio Awards (ACRAs): "Best Newcomer" in 2007, "Best Music Personality" in 2009 and most recently for "Best Music Presenter" in 2012.

In 2020, Lewis re-joined the ABC hosted the weekend Double J mornings until the end of 2021. In 2025, he became the Double J Arvos host.

=== Music ===
Lewis was the lead vocalist and played harmonica for funk/alternative rock band The Brown Hornet, and was later involved in a hip-hop project under the name Megabias. More recently, he has sung in a Melbourne-based group called Manchoir and the children's band The Haploids.

=== Film ===
Lewis had a role in the Australian film The Real Thing (2002), and has played the lead role in three short films: Like It Is, Ray (2004) and The Postman (2007). He was also an extra in Star Wars: Episode II – Attack of the Clones.

He has a cameo in the Australian film EMO the Musical (2016) as Doug Skeleton.

== Personal life ==
Lewis is married to Hollie, with whom he has a daughter and a son.

Lewis had a brother, Quinn, three years younger, who died by suicide in 2006.
