= Flashback (2000 TV series) =

Australian quiz show

- Presented by: Philip Clark
- Country of origin: Australia
- Original language: English
- No. of series: 3

Production
- Running time: 30 minutes
- Production company: Southern Star Productions

Original release
- Network: ABC TV
- Release: 17 January – 16 November 2000

Flashback is an Australian television quiz show broadcast on the Australian Broadcasting Corporation from 17 January to 16 November 2000. Hosted by radio presenter Philip Clark it featured three contestants trying to answer questions on events that occurred on certain dates. Clues were provided by historic and contemporary footage or from headings. Playing four nights a week the series had twelve weeks of heats with Monday to Wednesday winners playing off on Thursday and then a finals week with the nine best weekly winners.

== Reception ==
Matt Buchanan of The Sydney Morning Herald wrote "The success of game shows with non-celebrity contestants depends on the host almost as much as the format, prizes and comfort with which the punters can answer the questions at home. Clarkie'll get there. But I hope he doesn't get there too fast." Barbara Hooks of The Age wrote "Flashback provides pleasant diversion rather than the excitement promised." Errol Simper of The Australian wrote "If ABC television must overhaul its 6pm schedule via a quiz, then Flashback - which made its debut just a minute or two after 6pm last night - is more or less acceptable."
