= Abby Coleman =

Australian radio personality

- Born: Abby Jane Coleman; 26 May 1981 (age 45); Adelaide, South Australia
- Spouse: Scott Burdon (m. 2010)
- Children: 3
- Presenting career
- Show: Breakfast - Stav, Abby & Matt
- Station: B105
- Country: Australia

Abby Jane Coleman (born 26 May 1981) is an Australian radio presenter and comedian living in Brisbane, currently employed with B105. She rose to fame by finishing runner-up on the first season of the Australian version of The Mole as an 18-year-old.

== Career ==
Originally from South Australia, Coleman first appeared on Australian television in 2000 as a contestant on the first season of the Australian version of The Mole. She finished runner-up to Jan Moody, who correctly identified Alan Mason as the Mole in the finale. She subsequently went on to appear on a number of other television programs, including presenting Couch Potato on the Australian Broadcasting Corporation, filling in as weather presenter on the Nine Network's Weekend Today and appearing as a panellist on Network Ten's Have You Been Paying Attention?, among others.

In 2007 Coleman moved back to Adelaide to complete a degree at university and two years later she started presenting the afternoon segment on SAFM. After a brief stint in Sydney, where she filled in as presenter on the national countdown show The Hot30 Countdown for two months. In 2011, Coleman moved to Brisbane and joined B105 to host, Stav, Abby & Matt alongside Stav Davidson and Matty Acton.

== Personal life ==
Abby married her husband, Scott Burdon, in December 2010. They have three sons.
