= Jacob Bragg =

Australian long-distance runner

Personal information
- Nationality: Australia
- Born: 15 May 2000 (age 26) Australia
- Occupation: Student at Brisbane Grammar School

Sport
- Sport: Athletics
- Events: 1500 m, 3000 m, 5000 m, 10,000 m, Half Marathon
- Coached by: Brian Chapman

Achievements and titles
- Personal best: Half Marathon: 78:53 (Brisbane 2013)

Jacob Bragg (born 15 May 2000) is an Australian long-distance runner who holds the world single age record for U13 half marathon.

== Training ==
Bragg currently trains at UQ Athletics Centre and the Queensland Sport and Athletics Centre under the training of Brian Chapman.

== Career ==
On 24 November 2013, Bragg represented the University of California, Los Angeles and finished 6th in the open 5,000 m event, finishing 4 seconds behind the bronze medalist at the "We run the city" event at the Campus of the University of Southern California campus.
