= The Mole (Australian TV series) season 1 =

The Mole
- Season 1
- No. of episodes: 9

Release
- Original network: Seven Network
- Original release: 27 February – 24 April 2000

Season chronology
- Next → Season 2

The first season of the Australian version of The Mole aired between 27 February and 24 April 2000, on Seven Network. It took place mostly in Tasmania and was hosted by actor Grant Bowler.

== Show details ==
In this, the first season of The Mole, the players only knew ahead of time that they had applied to, and been accepted to appear on, a new reality game show. The knowledge that one among them was a traitor and working to sabotage their efforts was not revealed until just before the first round of gameplay began. Hundreds of people responded to a newspaper advertisement asking for applicants, and from this advertisement came the nine genuine contestants. The Mole was hired separately, though it was revealed during the season finale that he was artificially put through the rigours of the application process, so that he would be able to naturally talk about the experience with the others. The maximum prize for the season was $200,000, and this was the only season where the announced maximum and the actual maximum were the same. In contrast to all subsequent seasons, the events of each episode were referred to as "challenges" rather than "assignments."

In the years that followed, Alan Mason became the adjudicator and question researcher on the Australian version of The Weakest Link, as well as the question verifier on Who Wants to Be a Millionaire?, and the runner-up, Abby Coleman, is now a radio announcer on Hit 105 FM in Brisbane.

=== Contestants ===
Player	Age	Home	Occupation	Outcome
James Douloudis	37	Shepparton, Victoria	Computer Programmer	9th place
Patrick Fogarty	48	QLD	Winery Manager	8th place
Rocky Warren	39	Sydney	Marketing Executive	7th place
Josephine Pennicott	35	NSW	Aromatherapy Consultant	6th place
Ben Taylor	27	NSW	Hotel Manager	5th place
Beverley "Bev" Rilatt-Richardson	55	QLD	Homestay Interviewer	4th place
Linda Cameron	28	Perth, Western Australia	Fine Foods Merchant	3rd place
Abby Coleman	18	Adelaide, South Australia	Student	Runner-up
Alan Mason	37	Cockatoo, Victoria	Environmental Officer	The Mole
Jan Moody	40	Balwyn, Victoria	School Services Officer	Winner

=== Elimination chart ===
Elimination Chart
Player	1	2	3	4	5	6	7	8 & 9
Jan	IN	IN	IN	IN	IN	IN	IN	WINNER
Alan	IN	IN	IN	IN	IN	IN	IN	MOLE
Abby	IN	IN	IN	IN	IN	IN	IN	RUNNER-UP
Linda	IN	IN	IN	IN	IN	IN	OUT	
Beverley	IN	IN	IN	IN	IN	OUT		
Ben	IN	IN	IN	IN	OUT			
Josephine	IN	IN	IN	OUT				
Rocky	IN	IN	OUT					
Patrick	IN	OUT						
James	OUT							

Indicates the player won the game
Indicates the player was the mole
Indicates the player won a free pass
Indicates the player scored the lowest on the quiz and was eliminated

== Episodes ==
=== Episode 1 ===
Episode 1 recap
Location: Melbourne Tasmania
Challenge	Money earned	Possible earnings
Parachute Jumping	$10,000	$10,000
Luggage Repack	$5,000	$5,000
Hostage Rescue	$0	$10,000
Current Kitty	$15,000	$25,000
Elimination
James	1st player eliminated	

Parachute Jumping: After meeting for the first time at Melbourne's Essendon Airport and learning that one among them was the Mole, the players were presented with the challenge of flying to Tasmania and landing before the plane did – by tandem parachute jumping. If all ten of them jumped, the group would win $10,000. Several of them were nervous, particularly Josephine and James, but all ten jumped and the money was won.

Luggage Repack: After the parachute jumping, Abby, Ben, Jan, Patrick, and Rocky were taken straight to the group's hotel, while the other five were stopped and told to repack all ten players' luggage into backpacks. Whatever was left behind would be lost to that person for the remainder of their time on the show. Later, at the hotel, the host asked each of the five who were taken there straight away to predict an item that the others had kept out of their backpack (left it behind). If all of them guessed a specific, correct item, the group would win $5,000. The host had a video recording showing all of the items that were sent home, and each of them guessed a correct item, winning the money.

Hostage Rescue: The players were told to pick someone to be woken up very early the next morning. On a majority vote, Patrick was chosen. The host woke him in his hotel room at 3:07 AM the next morning and blindfolded him, taking him to a white-walled cell 45 minutes by car drive from the hotel. When the other nine gathered for breakfast, they found maps on their table to give them a starting point to find Patrick. They were split into three groups, one travelling by car, one by helicopter, and one by boat. If they found Patrick within two hours, they'd win $10,000 for the group kitty. They had mobile phones to contact one another and the hostage. Shortly after the assignment began, the host phoned Patrick and offered him one final clue – he needed to find a blue envelope. He found it under his bed, and it contained a note that stated that each vehicle had in it a key, but only one key would unlock him. As soon as Patrick looked out the window and noticed the radio towers across the river from him, the helicopter found him. The boat team was out of contact for most of the assignment, until Rocky noticed that Abby seemed to be hiding an extra phone battery. After the helicopter found them and dropped a message in a bottle with the details of their assignment, all three vehicles made it to Patrick's cell in time. They each found their keys, and found the one that unlocked him, the one from the boat. It seemed the $10,000 was won. However, in pursuit of the hostage, Ben drove extremely erratically and well above the speed limit, such that the police tried to pull him over. Ben failed to pull over and kept driving, and was shown later answering to the police for his infraction. The prize for the challenge was also revoked.

=== Episode 2 ===
Episode 2 recap
Location: Tasmania
Challenge	Money earned	Possible earnings
Tiger Rally	$10,000	$10,000
Humor Test	$0	$5,000
Golf	$0	$10,000
Current Kitty	$25,000	$50,000
Elimination
Patrick	2nd player eliminated	

Tiger Rally: The players were taken to Ross for a car relay race on a closed road. They divided themselves into three groups of three, each with a navigator and two mechanics. The job of the navigator was to guide a driver through the Tasmanian Tiger Rally. They had to know the course well, because the drivers were driving upwards of 150 kilometres per hour. Each car had to complete two laps of the 3-kilometre course, and after the first, the two mechanics had to swap the positions of the car's rear wheels. They had 35 minutes to complete six laps. Patrick was the first navigator, and he gave very clear instructions to his driver. Jan and Josephine fumbled quite a bit swapping his wheels, leaving the first leg to be completed a minute behind schedule. Beverley gave poor instructions to her driver and they briefly seemed hopelessly lost. Rocky and Alan made up for some of the time with a quick wheel change, but they were put even further behind schedule. The last car, navigated by Linda, made it through two laps with 6 seconds to spare, with their second lap just three seconds off the course's all-time record for fastest ever, so the money was won.

Humour Test: The host asked for the player least experienced in the game of golf. That was Josephine, who was not to participate in this challenge. The others were divided into two groups of four, given cameras, and told that within two hours they must record, among them, at least one minute of the sound and picture of other people laughing. They easily achieved this, but afterward it was revealed that this was only a test run – the real challenge, for $5,000, was to then replicate this feat without their subjects seeing the video camera. The players found this part of the challenge to be considerably more difficult, as it was tricky to film people without them knowing, and without a visible camera there was nothing to excuse their silly behaviour and thus the inhibitions of their subjects were greater. Both groups even resorted to cheating at one point, by asking people to laugh for them and telling them they were on camera (simply asking for the laugh would have been acceptable). Ultimately, this challenge was failed.

Golf: While the others were doing the Humour Test, Josephine was taken to the Launceston Golf Club, and given some instruction from a pro. Her challenge was to do the 350-metre par 4 18th hole, and she was to be given a maximum of fifteen strokes. The number of strokes she got depended on her teammates, and how they answered five trivia questions. Each question was worth 1–5 strokes, with the values, as well as the player who would answer each question, assigned by Josephine. Each value was used once. She won twelve strokes, with only Alan missing his question, which was for three, but she failed to complete the hole, missing a putt at the very end.

=== Episode 3 ===
Episode 3 recap
Location: Tasmania
Challenge	Money earned	Possible earnings
The Labyrinth	$10,000	$10,000
The Imposters	$10,000	$10,000
Charity	$0	$5,000
Current Kitty	$45,000	$75,000
Elimination
Rocky	3rd player eliminated	

The Labyrinth: Immediately after Patrick's elimination, late at night, the remaining eight players were told to pick two people who deserved a nice time. These were Josephine and Linda, and their "nice time" was simply being able to sit out the next challenge and go to bed. The others were taken to Richmond Maze, described as a "human-style computer game," and told to split into pairs, one with a runner and one with a navigator. One at a time, each runner would enter the maze, being guided by radio by their navigator, who had an overhead camera shot of the maze. The runners were pursued by two hunters, who, if they tagged the runners, could eliminate them. If any of the runners found the maze's exit, or if among them they survived inside the maze for a total of three minutes, they'd win $10,000. Alan ran first, with Beverley his navigator, and lasted just 28 seconds. The next runner was Ben, under direction of Abby, and he lasted 45 seconds. The final runner was Rocky, guided by Jan, and he survived inside the maze for a minute and 47 seconds, winning the $10,000, despite the fact a clear path to the exit was available for him well before reaching the three-minute mark.

The Imposters: The next morning, the players were split into three groups and sent to learn about tasting Tasmanian cheeses, beers, and wines. Josephine and Linda are sent to Ashgrove Cheese Farm. Abby, Ben, and Beverley are sent to Boag's Draught, a beer brewery. Alan, Jan, and Rocky are sent to Pipers Brook Vineyard. They were given tours of each facility and some instruction on how to become connoisseurs of each product by an expert. That evening, they were treated to a formal dinner, but at the dinner they were given a surprise challenge. On the table were three cheeses, three beers, and three wines. Two of each were made in Tasmania, and the third was from the mainland. The group who toured each respective facility had sampled the two Tasmanian products during their tour, and one at a time they were charged with identifying the impostor. Linda had to quickly made the decision herself because Josephine was reluctant to answer, despite being an enthusiastic cheese taster. Abby, Ben, and Beverley unanimously decided on the beer, despite Abby and Beverley not being beer drinkers. The wine tasters wasted time by swirling the glasses instead of tasting the wines. Jan is the one who makes the decision, and Alan and Rocky simply agree. All three groups correctly identified the non-Tasmanian product in their group of three, winning $10,000.

Charity: The group was told to pick two players who enjoy the sound of their own voices. They chose Ben and Rocky, who were given the challenge of organizing of a party that night, with proceeds to go to CanTeen, an organization for teens with cancer. If they could raise $1,000 for charity, they'd win $5,000 for the group kitty. Rocky, who had a background in marketing, came up with the idea of having a karaoke night in a bar. He approached numerous local businesses to get them to donate prizes to auction off at the party, and set the cover at $6 a head. He and Ben also handed out fliers to locals to advertise the event. The other players joined in the effort to try to draw more people in to the bar. Once the party started, they had two hours to raise the $1,000. They managed to raise $934, which was donated to CanTeen, but they narrowly missed out on the money for the challenge.

=== Episode 4 ===
Episode 4 recap
Location: Tasmania
Challenge	Money earned	Possible earnings
Fishing Trip	$5,000	$5,000
Night on an Island	$10,000	$10,000
Raft Escape	$0	$5,000
Current Kitty	$60,000	$95,000
Free passes
—	No one phoned to leave the island	
Elimination
Josephine	4th player eliminated	

Fishing Trip: The players first picked their two best Girl Guides – Jan and Linda. They were sent away to build a raft capable of supporting five people, which would figure into a later challenge. They could only use wood and rope. The remaining five were split into two groups and told to, among them, catch at least 8 kilograms of fish. Alan, Abby, and Ben went well out from the coastline to spearfish and hunt for crayfish and abalone, while Beverley and Josephine stayed in the calmer waters near the coastline of Strahan and hunted with a net inside a trout pen. Alan, Abby, and Ben all became extremely seasick on their trip, due to swells in the water and the stinking fish guts they had to use to bait their cray pots. They brought back less than 1 kilo of fish, but Beverley and Josephine found enough trout, which each weighed up to 2 kilos individually, to win the $5,000.

Night on an Island: After the fish was counted, the players boarded a yacht for a two-hour trip, and were informed that five of them were to spend the night on Sarah Island. The two spared were the ones who had not gone fishing, Jan and Linda. They'd enjoy a relaxing evening on the yacht with the host while the others had to rough it, with only the fish they'd caught in the previous challenge to be their food for the night. If all five of them stayed on the island until 6 am the next morning, $10,000 would be won. The host gave the group of five a satellite phone, and if any of them wanted out, they could immediately call the host and be taken to the yacht. Furthermore, if anyone called, they'd win a free pass through to the next episode. Immediately after leaving the yacht and going on the island, the players devised to split the phone, with Alan keeping the handset and Ben keeping the battery, so no one could phone without everyone knowing. Though many of them were tired, some of them sick, and all of them but Beverley unwilling to eat the fish they caught themselves, they managed to win the challenge.

Raft Escape: The next morning, the five players on the island had to use the raft Jan and Linda had built while they were fishing to get from the island to the yacht. If they could make it to the yacht, 100 metres offshore, with none of them getting wet above the chest, they'd win $5,000. Beverley fell into the water almost immediately after the raft left the shore, with the others quickly following her, and the challenge was lost.

=== Episode 5 ===
Episode 5 recap
Location: Tasmania
Challenge	Money earned	Possible earnings
Capture the Flag	$10,000	$10,000
Brainteasers	$0	$5,000
Wildlife Photography	$0	$10,000
Current Kitty	$70,000	$120,000
Free passes
Alan	Won in the "Capture the Flag" challenge	
Elimination
Ben	5th player eliminated	

Capture the Flag: The players met the host in the wilderness. Their challenge was to reach a red flag positioned between two radio towers up the hill from them. They had 30 minutes to reach it, but had to evade the three snipers who would be shooting at them with paintball guns, one of whom would be in a helicopter. The players were also given guns, and if anyone shot anyone, a sniper shot a player, a player shot a sniper, or a player shot a player, they'd be taken out of the game. The last scenario was a realistic one, because if there remained just one player left alive to reach the flag, the group would win the $10,000, and that one player would win a free pass through to the next episode. If more than one player were still alive when they reached the flags, they'd win the money, but no free pass. After Abby eliminated one of the snipers, another in turn eliminated her, and Alan was the only player left alive. He eliminated the other two snipers, took the red flag, and won $10,000 for the group along with a free pass for himself.

Brainteasers: The players were split into two groups of three and told, for $5,000, to make their way through a house in Strahan, finding three brainteaser puzzles each on their way. Each brainteaser had to be successfully solved before they could move on. There was a 45-minute time limit to get out of the house, but each incorrect guess on any brainteaser cost them 5 minutes from that time limit. Alan, Beverley, and Jan did well in this challenge, making just one incorrect guess through all three puzzles. Abby, Ben, and Linda only solved the first puzzle after 27 minutes and two incorrect guesses, never solved the second, and never even saw the third.

Wildlife Photography: The players were split into three groups of two, given cameras, and told to photograph wildlife. After their time was up, they were each to submit four photographs, and if a wildlife expert could find six distinct species among the twelve photographs, the group would win $10,000. They were sent to three different locales, a beach, a forest, and open water, to seek their species. Abby and Linda submitted two pictures of their lens cap, one of grey clouds, and one of Abby herself. Alan and Beverley managed to at least shoot pictures of their terrain, but got no animal species either. Ben and Jan managed three species in their photos, but it was not enough to win the money.

=== Episode 6 ===
Episode 6 recap
Location: Tasmania
Challenge	Money earned	Possible earnings
Dam Flags	$0	$10,000
Predictions	$0	$5,000
Interrogation	$0	$10,000
Current Kitty	$70,000	$145,000
Free passes
Linda	Won in the "Interrogation" challenge	
Elimination
Beverley	6th player eliminated	

Dam Flags: The host met the players at their breakfast table and asked for the one of them who best characterized endurance and tenacity. Alan said this was probably him, but that it would be best not to separate him from the women, so the group chose Linda. She was sent away, not to participate in this challenge. The other four were taken to Gordon Dam, and told, for $10,000, to abseil on the dam wall and retrieve, among them, at least two of the three flags that had been placed on the dam face. There were two 60-metre abseils and one 140-metre abseil. They could only abseil once each, and retrieve one flag each. Only Alan had had any previous experience abseiling. The flags were off to one side of the abseil line, so the players had to swing off the dam face to reach them. Jan was first, on a 60-metre abseil, but could not retrieve a flag. Alan was next, on the 60-metre abseil as well, and though he dropped past the blue flag, the hardest one to retrieve, he managed to get the red one. Abby then tried the 60-metre drop, but after a few attempts she found that she had dropped too far and could not get to it. Beverley was then left to attempt the 140-metre drop. As she reached the bottom, she had to release a rope to the others to swing her toward the flag. She was quickly physically drained, and ultimately unable to retrieve it, meaning failure in the challenge.

Predictions: The next challenge involved Abby, Alan, Beverley, and Jan predicting Linda's behaviour in three situations. Linda was spending the day in Richmond with an interrogation expert in training for the next challenge. There were cameras following her, but she did not know the others were watching her on closed-circuit TV. To win $5,000, the other four needed to predict Linda's behaviour correctly on two of the three scenarios. The first scenario involved a car driving past Linda that was to throw a can at her feet. The players predicted Linda would pick it up and throw it away, but she didn't. In the second, Linda and the interrogation expert visited the abandoned Richmond Gaol, and the players had to predict whether Linda would step inside a cell popularly believed to be haunted. They predicted that she would, and she did. The last scenario involved Linda and the interrogation expert's lunch. The group predicted, based on the time of day, that Linda would not order an alcoholic drink with her food, but she in fact did, so the challenge was lost.

Interrogation: The host woke Abby, Alan, Beverley, and Jan up at quarter to one in the morning the next day, and took them back to Richmond Gaol. There, they were interrogated by Linda, whose goal it was to discern what their challenge the previous day had been (the predictions challenge). If the others could keep the information from her until dawn, they'd win $10,000 for the kitty, but if Linda got her answer and got it right, the group would win nothing and she'd win a free pass through to the next episode. If Linda is not able to get the information, she can do a coin toss with any one of four and would have a one in two chance of winning exemption, otherwise the selected contestant would win exemption instead. The four of them were locked in cells and called in one at a time to be interrogated by Linda. At any time, they could decide to give her the answer, and everyone would get to back to the hotel. This challenge was particularly difficult on Abby, who had been close with Linda previously and seemed to suffer the most from the conditions. Linda called the host a few hours into her interrogations, and gave a specific, correct answer to the question of what the other four had done the previous day. It was not explicitly said who gave the information up.

=== Episode 7 ===
Episode 7 recap
Location: Tasmania Melbourne
Challenge	Money earned	Possible earnings
Celebrity Photography	$10,000	$10,000
Sports Champions	$5,000	$5,000
Roulette	$10,000	$10,000
Current Kitty	$95,000	$170,000
Elimination
Linda	7th player eliminated	

Celebrity Photography: The group chose Abby as the player most comfortable in the glamour world of photography. She was flown to Melbourne, and told to take a photograph of a recognizable celebrity. She had to have the celebrity's permission for the photograph. If, upon her return to Hobart later that day, the subject was identifiable to Alan, Jan, and Linda, the group would win $10,000. Abby's first thought was to photograph a tennis player at the ongoing Australian Open tennis tournament. She managed to get a security guard to give her access to centre court, where she was able to photograph Jelena Dokić, but she had forgotten to ask permission. After some fruitless celebrity-hunting in cafes and hotels, Abby at last encountered a Seven Network sportscaster (Jim Wilson) and a football player from Essendon, and photographed them with their permission. When she returned, she had to choose one of them for the group to identify. She chose the footballer, and Linda successfully named him, winning the $10,000. That person was James Hird.

Sports Champions: While Abby was in Melbourne, the other three were presented the task of competing in sports against three champions of those sports. One player each participated in go-kart racing, archery, and bowls. The players got to choose who played what sport and against which opponent (they had a photograph of the three champions), not knowing who was a champion at what, and trying to avoid matching the champion up with their chosen sport. They needed to win just one sport in order to win $5,000. Alan was soundly defeated at go-kart racing, but took solace in the fact that his opponent had in fact been the go-kart champion. Jan was somewhat more competitive, but still easily lost at archery to the bowls champion. At bowls, Linda made a miracle shot on the last ball, knocking two of the archery champion's balls away from the jack and putting hers closest, winning the $5,000 seemingly by sheer luck.

Roulette: The players were taken to the Wrest Point Hotel Casino in Hobart. They were presented with four envelopes, each with a pair of tasks on it. In each envelope, there was relatively simple task, along with a rather unpleasant one. The spin of the roulette wheel determined which task each player got – black meant they got the relatively simple task, red the rather unpleasant one. The fourth envelope contained all three of the previous pairs of tasks. Three of the four envelopes had to be completed to win $10,000. Here is each brace of tasks, and how the roulette wheel decided their fate:

Black – Dye your hair (Jan)
Red – Have your head shaved

Black – Have an acupuncture session (Abby)
Red – Have your eyebrow pierced

Black – Paint a nude
Red – Be painted in the nude (Linda)

Alan, who drew the envelope containing all three, hit black each time. Jan dyed her hair a strong red tint. Abby was nervous, but completed her acupuncture session. Linda posed nude for an artist in a shop window in Hobart's most crowded market square. Alan dyed his hair blond, drew a rather crude nude portrait, and had an acupuncture session himself, meaning all four envelopes had been completed, winning the money.

=== Episode 8 ===
Episode 8 recap
Location: Tasmania
Challenge	Money earned	Possible earnings
Bike the Mountain	$10,000	$10,000
Treasure Hunt	$0	$10,000
Set Sail	$10,000	$10,000
Final Kitty	$115,000	$200,000
Reveal
Abby	The runner-up	
Jan	The winner of $115,000	
Alan	The Mole	

Bike the Mountain: The players met at the foot of Mount Wellington and were told to, in relay, cycle to the summit. The mountain is 1270 metres in elevation, and the road leading to its summit is 27 kilometres long. They had three hours to get there, to win $10,000. It would take a professional an hour and three-quarters. They were able to trade off as often as they cared. Incredibly, the players encountered snow and ice on the road as they neared the summit though the episode took place in the middle of summer. They made it to the summit with 20 minutes to spare.

Treasure Hunt: Each player received keys to a vehicle, with instructions for the penultimate challenge inside them. Each player was led by those instructions to a list of treasures, objects from around the city of Hobart that they needed to find, within two hours. There were six items on the list, and to win $10,000, they needed to retrieve at least four of them. The only catch was that they had no way of contacting one another, so they had no way of knowing who had already retrieved what, and ran the risk of each of them pursuing the same treasure (each one would only count once). The six treasures were:

1. A 16th-century newsreader
2. A ball that disappears
3. A photo of a moving dinosaur
4. A photo of the only piece of rope on a yacht
5. A lost mobile phone
6. A photo taken with a Tasmanian devil

The 16th century newsreader was a man dressed in period costume performing as a town crier. Jan took a photo with him, but Abby actually brought the man back to the host, which was what was needed for that treasure to count. The only piece of rope on a yacht was something of a trick question – there were many pieces of rope on the yachts that Abby and Jan looked at, but the only thing on a yacht that's called a rope is the rope on its bell, so neither of them were counted as finding this treasure. They collected photos from an exhibit on dinosaurs and with a Tasmanian devil, and Alan found the lost phone, so it seemed the $10,000 was won. However, Alan broke a driving law in pursuit of the phone (he made a U-turn over a median strip), so the money was revoked.

Set Sail: The final challenge saw Abby, Alan, and Jan board a replica 19th century sailing ship for the night. When they woke in the morning, they were charged with raising the ship's main sail, at the top of the highest mast. It would take the experienced crew ten minutes; the players were given half an hour. After paying close attention to how the crew raised it the previous evening, the players managed to raise the sail in time and win the money.

Once the ship arrived in Port Arthur, the players took the final computer questionnaire. It took place in a jail. Once it was complete, the host presented each player with a key, telling them that only the winner's key would open their door. Jan emerged as the winner of $115,000. The host then told her to unlock the Mole, and she opened Alan's door. When Abby was let out of her cell, she revealed that she took the questionnaire believing Jan was the Mole, meaning she never stood a chance.

=== Episode 9 ===
This episode saw the full cast of players reunited. They gathered in Sydney to watch episode eight on TV, during which time only Abby, Alan, and Jan knew the outcome of the game. When polled, only Rocky said he thought Alan was the Mole – most of the others believed it was Jan. James, Rocky, Josephine, Ben, and Linda had all taken the computer questionnaire believing Jan was the Mole on the nights that they were eliminated. Rocky claimed that Jan had confessed to him that she was the Mole, and that for that knowledge he was to give her $10,000 of his eventual prize winnings. Jan vigorously denied any such deal ever took place.

== Mole Activity ==
=== Sabotage ===
The following acts of sabotage were revealed in the final episode:

Hostage Rescue: Alan jammed the signal on communications coming into the helicopter, and purposely searched for the key to unlock Patrick in places he knew it would not be.

Humour Test: Alan's camerawork caught very little human laughter, but it perfectly recorded his teammates' cheating. He then instructed Jan to record with a wide shot that made it very difficult to catch the sight of laughter – this is how Jan first came to suspect him. He also erased some successful footage without anyone knowing.

Golf: Alan purposely got his question wrong.

Wine Tasting: Even though Alan was the only member of the team with experience in wine tasting, he made no contribution to choosing the right wine.

Fishing Trip: Alan was the only one to go out to re-check the cray pots, and on his return to shore, his motorboat mysteriously ran out of fuel. Earlier, when spearfishing, Alan let go of a huge fish that was within his grasp.

Raft Escape: Alan tipped the raft over moments after it left shore, while making it look like Beverly purposely fell in.

Brainteasers: Alan did almost nothing to help Beverley and Jan solve the brain teasers, instead he encouraged them to double-check their answers, even when he was sure they were correct, in order to waste time. However, when he knew they were going to succeed, he calculated the answer to make him look like the hero. However, Abby, Ben, and Linda failed to complete theirs, so Alan was left looking less suspicious.

Wildlife Photography: Alan and Beverley initially agreed in the car on which photos to submit, but moments later in front of the host and the wildlife expert, Alan subtly convinced Bev to pick a different photo.

Dam Flags: Alan was the only player who had previously abseiled, but he purposely missed the harder flag and went to the easier one, since he (correctly) thought it was unlikely that Abby or Bev would be able to get the harder flags. He also spun Bev around as much as possible from the dam floor, disorienting her.

Treasure Hunt: Alan's road violation was deliberate, and he only sought one treasure in the first place.

=== Clues ===
The following clues were revealed in the final episode:

James' Words: During episode one, James said in a confession that Alan was a prime suspect to be the Mole, but that he didn't go with that feeling because he was fond of Alan. He went against his gut and wound up being the first player eliminated, meaning he was right all along and never knew it.

Celebrity Photography: Alan is an AFL fan and lives near Essendon, the team of the football player Abby photographed. If Alan were playing to win, he'd have instantly identified the man.
