= Recovery (TV series) =

- Genre: Music
- Created by: Paul Clarke, Bruce Kane
- Developed by: Paul Clarke, Bruce Kane
- Written by: Angus Sampson
- Directed by: Janet Argall (Sydney), Joe Murray(Melbourne)
- Presented by: Dylan Lewis
- Starring: Leigh Whannell, Angus Sampson, Jane Gazzo, Tamara Rewse, Jodie J.Hill, Vince Perry
- Theme music composer: Iggy Pop
- Opening theme: Lust For Life
- Ending theme: band play-out
- Country of origin: Australia
- Original language: English

Production
- Producer: Paul Clarke
- Production location: Melbourne
- Camera setup: various
- Running time: 3 hours

Original release
- Network: ABC
- Release: 20 April 1996 – 29 April 2000

Recovery was a music and youth-oriented television series that was broadcast by ABC TV in Australia. The show was aired each Saturday morning from 9 am to 12 pm, following the overnight video clip program, Rage, and was broadcast from April 20, 1996, to April 29, 2000. Recovery was produced "live-to-air" from ABC's Ripponlea studios in Melbourne, Victoria, Australia. Each episode featured a mix of live performances, music videos, other youth-relevant pop culture segments and comedy sketches.

== Personnel ==
Cast of Recovery in 1997

Recovery was primarily hosted by Dylan Lewis, although in the earlier episodes produced in Sydney, the hosting and segment introduction duties were shared with others, such as Sarah Macdonald. Once production moved to Melbourne, the show was co-hosted by Lewis and Tamara Rewse, who was to be replaced by Jane Gazzo, and was shot entirely before a live studio audience.

Film reviews were presented by Leigh Whannell, who expressed an appreciation of the horror genre and later co-created the Saw horror film franchise. Vince Perry judged home made versions of popular films that would be submitted weekly by viewers in a segment called Cinema Amateur. Pheona Donohoe of the Scenestar organisation presented the all-ages gig report and DJ J'Nett presented the electronic dance music segment. Actor/comedian Angus Sampson was also a regular co-host, although mainly under the guise of his mysterious alter-ego, "The Enforcer". This format would last until November 1998, whereupon Gazzo moved to the United Kingdom (UK), while Lewis pursued other interests, including his band The Brown Hornet.

In 2011, Whannell wrote the following in regard to the producer of the show, Bruce Kane:

The producer of the show, Bruce Kane, is still the hippest 'adult' I’ve ever met in my life... He wore a suit to work everyday, no matter what the weather. Not a business suit, mind you - a dapper number of the type worn by guys who go drinking with Nick Cave in darkened Berlin bars. His tobacco soaked speaking voice relayed stories of his musician past with a perfect Robert Mitchum mumble. Whenever he cast his eye over me, one of his eyebrows stayed raised in a state of permanent bemusement at my blabbering. I had entire conversations with him in which he said nothing and yet I still walked away somehow satisfied that all of my questions had been answered... I will forever be grateful to Bruce for giving me a job on 'Recovery'. I would never have given me a job, but he did.

== Format changes ==
As a result of many attempts by ABC TV to cut production costs, Recovery would dramatically change its format at least three times until it was finally cancelled in April 2000. Set originally in a house where the presenters "lived" together, the show then became live-music oriented, moving to a studio and broadcast live in front of an audience. The show then moved back to the house format with more music clips shown than live performances, eventually ending the live music segments. During its final months on air, Recovery switched its focus entirely on to electronic music, omitting the host segments entirely.

Recovery often made references to Monkey. Recovery's audience favoured the series to such a degree that they began airing Monkey regularly during their show. When Recovery was put on hiatus during the non-ratings season, it was replaced with three hours of Monkey.

== Post-Recovery ==
Shortly after the show's cancellation, Lewis, Sampson and Perry returned to appear in The 10:30 Slot. The show was similar in format to Recovery, with a more adult-oriented approach. The show ran from 1999 until 2000.

In 2006, jtv was launched as a successor programme; however, Rage has re-broadcast episodes of Recovery each year, since early-2004, to make up for the lack of video clips from the ABC at that time.

== 20th Anniversary ==
In November 2016, a special 2CD/2DVD box set was released, to celebrate the 20th anniversary of the show. It features over 100 live performances, as well as archival photos, and written recollections from the cast, producers, and bands who performed on the program.

== Other media ==
In 1997 ABC Music released Recovery (Hits From The Back Door), a CD compiling songs recorded between 1996 and 1997 on the Recovery TV series. This was followed by a similar compilation in 1999 titled Recovery: Ready For Transmission which featured liner notes by The Enforcer.

A Recovery Magazine was launched in 1998, and was sub-edited by Angus Sampson. The magazine was published monthly until its closure in 2000 after 25 issues.

== See also ==
- List of Australian music television shows
