= Li'l Horrors =

- Genre: Puppetry; Comedy
- Created by: Ralph Strasser
- Directed by: Chris Langman; Helen Gaynor; Declan Eames; Ralph Strasser
- Composers: Janine De Lorenzo; Al Mullins
- Country of origin: Australia
- Original language: English
- No. of seasons: 1
- No. of episodes: 52

Production
- Executive producer: Tim Brooke-Hunt
- Producers: Tony Wright; Stuart Menzies
- Running time: 12 minutes
- Production companies: December Films; Beyond International; MBP

Original release
- Network: Seven Network
- Release: 2000 – 2001

Li'l Horrors is an Australian children's comedy puppetry television series which screened on the Seven Network in 2001. The series contained 52 episodes each 12 minute, 30 seconds in length, with double episodes usually screened in a 30-minute time slot.

== Plot ==
Li'l Horrors takes place in the home of horror actress Morbidda Bates. The series follows the adventures of little monster characters based on classic, fictional horror characters such as Count Dracula, Frankenstein's monster, the Mummy, werewolf, Gill-Man, zombie, Quasimodo, Medusa and gargoyles.

== Characters ==
- Vladamir "Vlad" Bloode is a vampire based on Dracula from Bram Stoker's gothic horror novel of the same name. A notorious trickster around Maug Stone Hall, his favourite pastime is to pull practical jokes at the other Horrors' expense.
- Duncan Stein is based on Frankenstein's monster from the 1931 film Frankenstein. Gluttonous yet friendly, he is also dim-witted and sorely lacks in social skills.
- Cleo Patra is an Egyptian mummy based on modern pop culture. She uses a lot of Valley Girl filler in her speech. Ironically her namesake was not a native-born Egyptian but a Greek immigrant.
- Webster Swampson is a piscine boy based on various sea monsters. A school brainiac and a bit of a nerd, he often gets the other Horrors out of a crisis. Storylines based around him involve some invention of his.
- Abercrombie Necros is a zombie who does little more than watch television. When the set is faulty, broken, or otherwise out of order, he often melts down, simply by repeating phrases often appearing on television sets without reliable signals. These meltdowns don't happen every time though.
- Medusilla Venimski is a pretty monster based on (and named for) the youngest of three gorgons, Medusa. She is very vain as she often admires her beauty, which does not turn others (or herself) to stone, unlike the ugliness of her namesake. Her hair can talk as well, as evidenced in several episodes.
- Claudia Howell is a werewolf girl, who, unlike her mythological basis, appears to have no human form (although she does live in fear of transforming into a sweet little girl every full moon). She acts and communicates like a dog, for example, growling when angered or insulted. Sensitive to insults towards categories she falls within, Claudia is often the target of Vlad's trickery.
- Quasi Modo is a thorough spoof of Quasimodo from Victor Hugo's 1831 novel The Hunchback of Notre-Dame.
- Garg, one of two grotesques
- Goyle, Garg's permanent companion
- Bruce
- Ratso Risotto
- Humpfree
- Morbidda Bates, known as "Miss Morbidda" to the Li'l Horrors, is the owner of Maug Stone Hall. She is unseen but referred to in most episodes. Her voice addresses the Horrors in the opening credits.

== List of episodes ==
- Monsters 'r Us by Brendan Luno
- Lolly Folly by Robert Greenberg
- Fangs for Your by Robert Greenberg
- Time Out ! by Brendan Luno
- Ghost of a Chance by Kevin Nemeth
- Ghoul Friends by Kevin Nemeth
- Rock Shock by Glen Dolman
- Trial and Terror by Glen Dolman
- I Want my Mummy by Jamie Forbes
- Were-with All by Beverley MacDonald
- Webster the Brave by Nancy Groll
- The Morbida Mystery by Nancy Groll
- Trouble Double by Clare Madsen
- The Coming of Quasi by Clare Madsen
- Stop and Gough by David Phillips
- Ice Scream by David Phillips
- The Cubby House War by Brendan Luno
- Beelzebubba by Brendan Luno
- Love Lettuce in the Sand (Which) by Jamie Forbes
- Play's the Thing by Hugh Stuckey
- Humpy Birthday to You by Anthony Watt
- Send in the Clones by Anthony Watt
- The Magic Hat by Glen Dolman
- The Treasure of the Scary Madre by Glen Dolman
- Comet Through the Wry by Adam Todd
- The Bleurgh with Project by Adam Todd
- Who Wants to Flea a Million Heirs by Anthony Watt
- The Spaceman Cometh by Anthony Watt
- Wouldn't it be Nice Revolting by Brendan Luno
- Mirror, Rirrom by Brendan Luno
- Now You See Me, Now You Don't by Glen Dolman
- The Good, the Bad and the Fluffy by Glen Dolman
- For whom the Bell Tolls by Annie Fox
- Mummy, Dearest by Annie Fox
- Revenge of the Zombie by Meg Mappin
- Vlad and Duncan's Excellent Adventure by Penelope Trevor
- Hall of the Mounted Things by Forbes
- Home Alone by Anthony Watt
- I Dream of Greenie by Anthony Watt
- Who Dares Wins by David Rapsey
- Under Your Spell by David Rapsey
- Follow the Black Asphalt Road by Anthony Watt
- Happily Ever Laughter by Anthony Watt
- Altered States by Brendan Luno
- Hamelot in Camelot by Brendan Luno
- Stinging in the Reign by Peter Hepworth
- I Won't, Dunce by Peter Hepworth
- Pants on Fire by Nancy Groll
- Head of the Class by Ray Boseley
- Speak No Evil by Chris Annastasiades
- The Wolf Who Cried Boy by Nancy Groll

== Voices ==
- Paula Morrell
- Ric Herbert
- Rachel King
- Richard Hart
- Abbe Holmes
- Michael King
- Matthew King

== International ==
The series also screened in the UK, Canada and France.

== See also ==
- List of Australian television series
