= Sue Wah Chin =

Chinese-Australian businesswoman

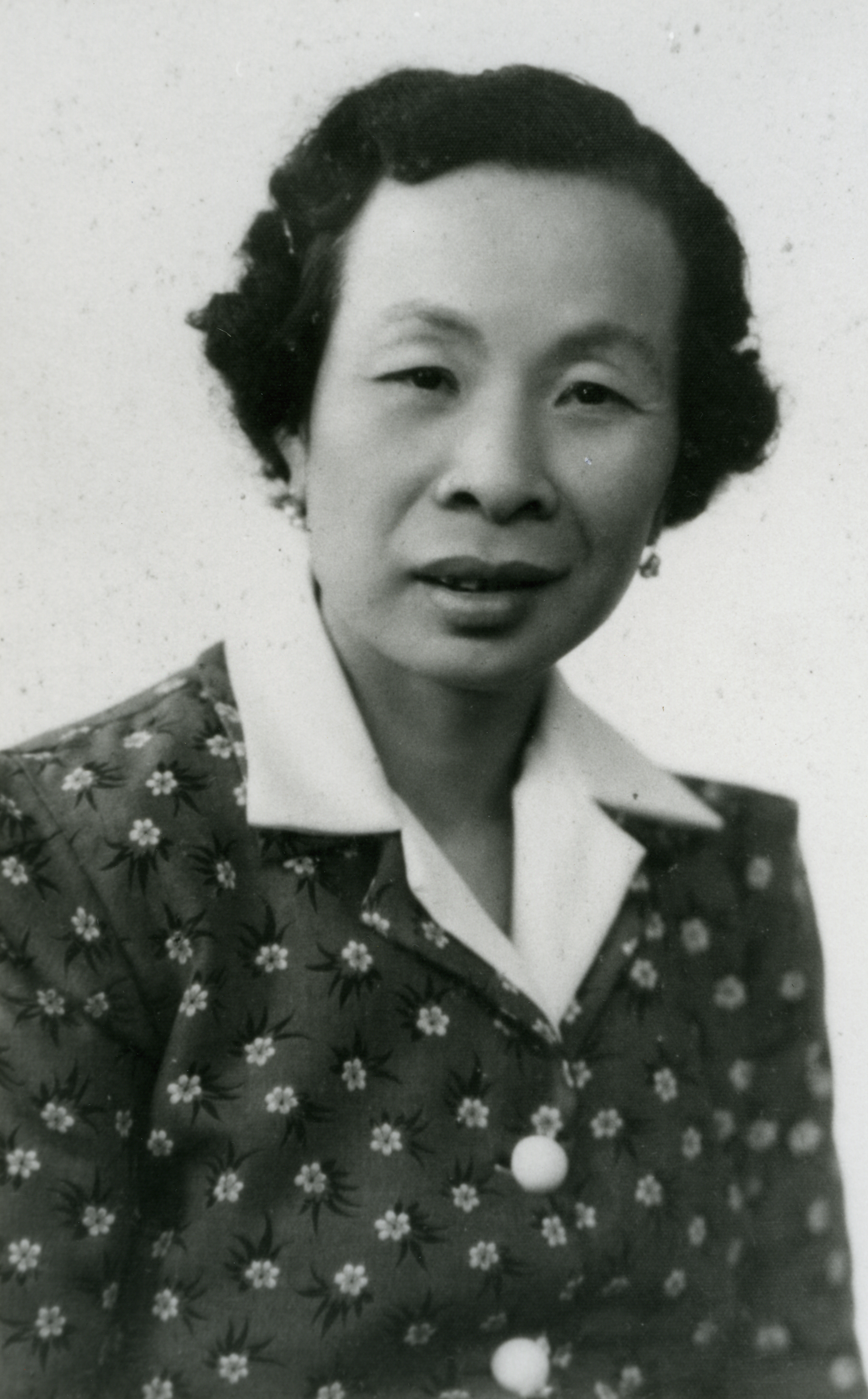
- Sue Wah Chin
- Born: 21 July 1900; Guangdong Province, China
- Died: 27 March 2000 (aged 99); Darwin, Northern Territory
- Occupations: Restaurant and shop opener
- Spouse: Chin Ack Sam
- Children: Eric, Raymond, Darwina, Oswald, Wellington, John, Florence, Norma, Gordon, Sylvia and Victor

Sue Wah Chin (21 July 1900 – 27 March 2000) was a Chinese entrepreneur living and working in Darwin in the Northern Territory of Australia. The Sue Wah Chin or 'Stonehouse' building, one of the remaining heritage buildings in central Darwin, is named after her.

== Early life ==
Chin was born in Guangdong Province in China on 21 July 1900 to landholder and businessman Chiu Hing Foy who ran a business in Baltimore in the United States of America and his wife, Chiu Wu See. She had one brother, Chiu Goon Pak. She went to school in Canton, a rare opportunity for a woman at this time, and trained as a teacher. After completing her education it was arranged she would marry Chin Ack Sam, the third son of wealthy Darwin tailor Chin Toy who had first come to Australia in 1883. They married in 1920 in China and had the first two of eleven children, Eric and Raymond.

== Life in the Northern Territory ==
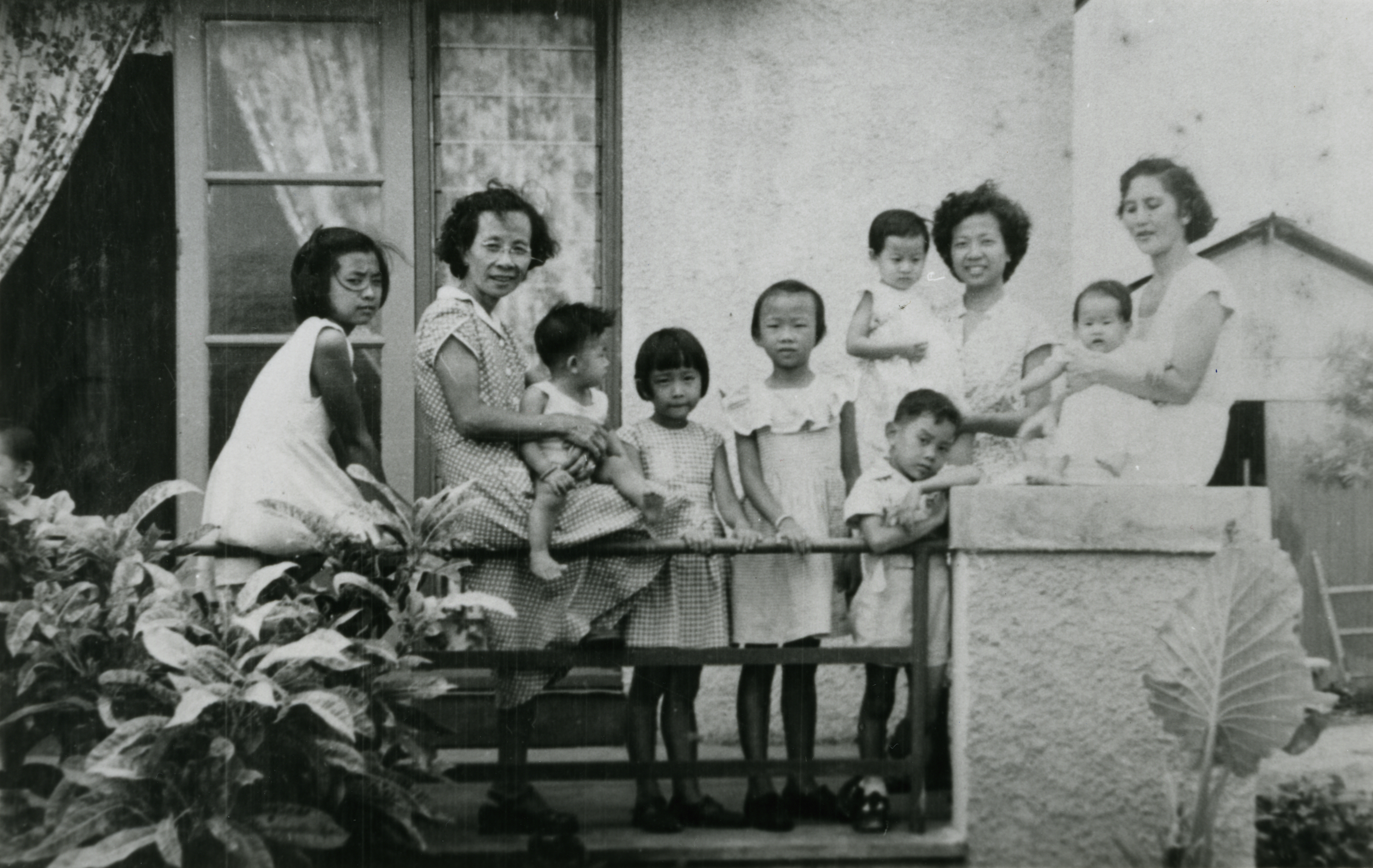
Sue Wah Chin and family

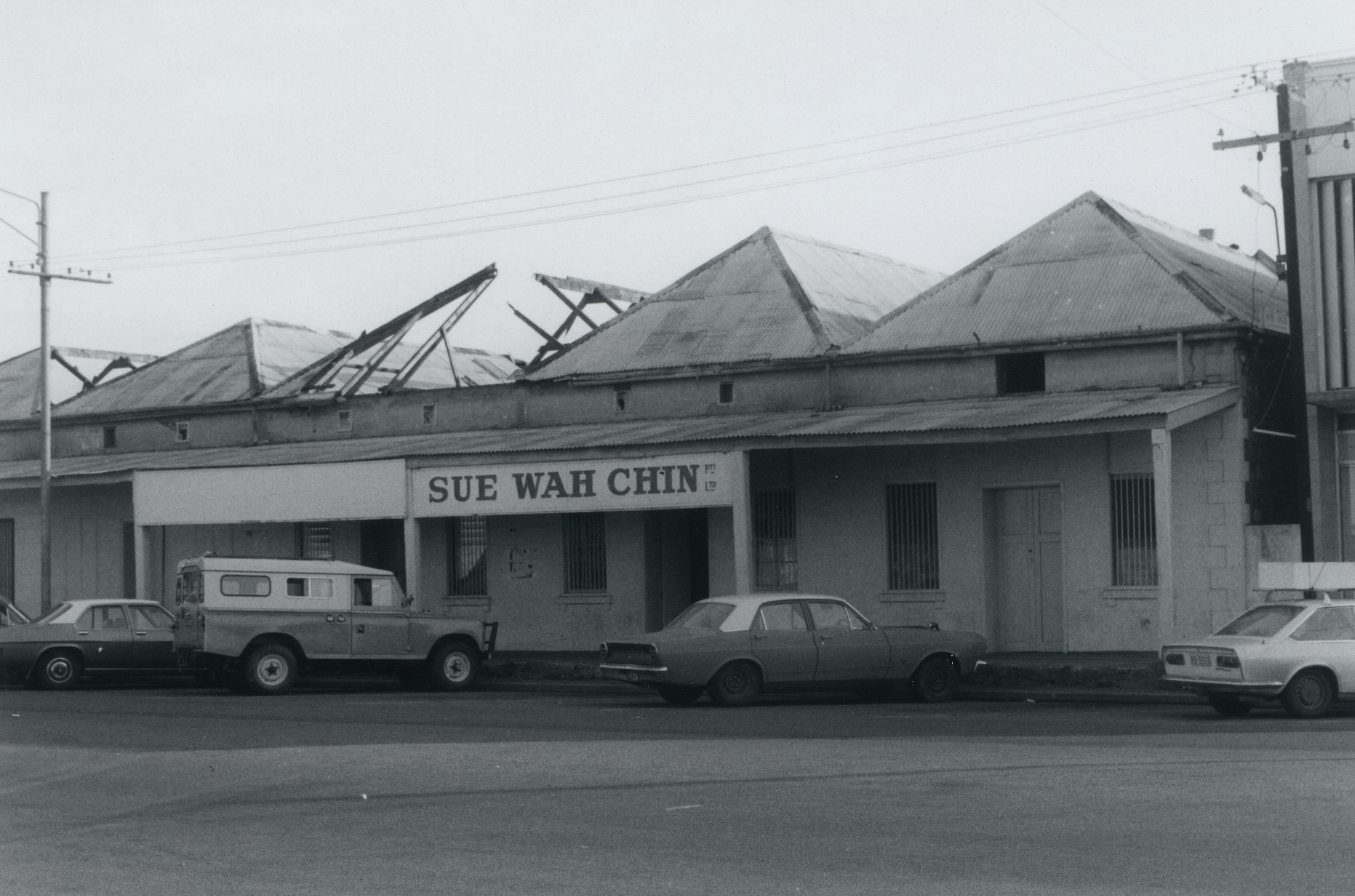
Sue Wah Chin building in central Darwin after Cyclone Tracy.

The Chin family left for Australia in 1928 staying initially with Chin Toy at the rear of his store in the Fang Cheong Loong building on Cavenagh Street in Darwin. Chin had three more children in Darwin, Darwina, Oswald, and Wellington and worked as a seamstress.

The family returned to China in 1933 to seek education for the two eldest sons. Their ship the SS Taiping hit rough seas due to a typhoon near Hong Kong and capsized. The family lost four out of five pieces of luggage. Chin remained in China until 1938 when Japan invaded China. They travelled from town to town trying to secure visa's to return to Australia. They eventually succeeded travelling back to Darwin via Thursday Island.

The family then lived on Woods Street, where Chin and her daughter Darwina assisted with tailoring. Chin had three more children John, Florence, and Norma.

The family was evacuated to Adelaide before the bombing of Darwin by the Japanese in February 1942. In Adelaide, they opened a restaurant in Rundle Street. Chin had three more children during this time, Gordon, Sylvia, and Victor.

After returning to Darwin in 1949, Chin partnered with other Chinese families to open a Chinese restaurant in the Don Hotel, moving into the old stonehouses (or stone houses) in Cavenagh Street. In addition to the restaurant they operated a store there which was frequented by Darwin children seeking their salty plums. It soon became known as the Sue Wah Chin building which still exists today, having survived some damage during Cyclone Tracy. Ownership of the building remained in the Chin family until 2008 and it is now heritage protected. They operated a store there which was frequented by Darwin children seeking their salty plums.

== Later life ==
Chin was naturalised in 1956. Her husband died in 1968 leaving her to care for her family of 11 children. She died on 27 March 2000.
