= One Size Fits All (TV series) =

One Size Fits All is an Australian sketch comedy television series that was first screened on the ABC in 2000. The series starred six female comedians and featured comedy sketches, one-liners, monologues, six-on-one interviews and free-form dancing.

== Cast ==
- Matilda Donaldson
- Christine Basil
- Mary-Anne Fahey
- Lynda Gibson
- Andrea Powell
- Denise Scott

== Supporting cast ==
- Rod Quantock
- Robyn Butler
- Sean Dooley
- Russell Fletcher
- Linda Haggar
- Vin Hedger
- Fahey Younger
