= 2000 Marlborough helicopter crash =

Fatal helicopter accident in Australia

Coordinates: 22.815°S 149.891°E

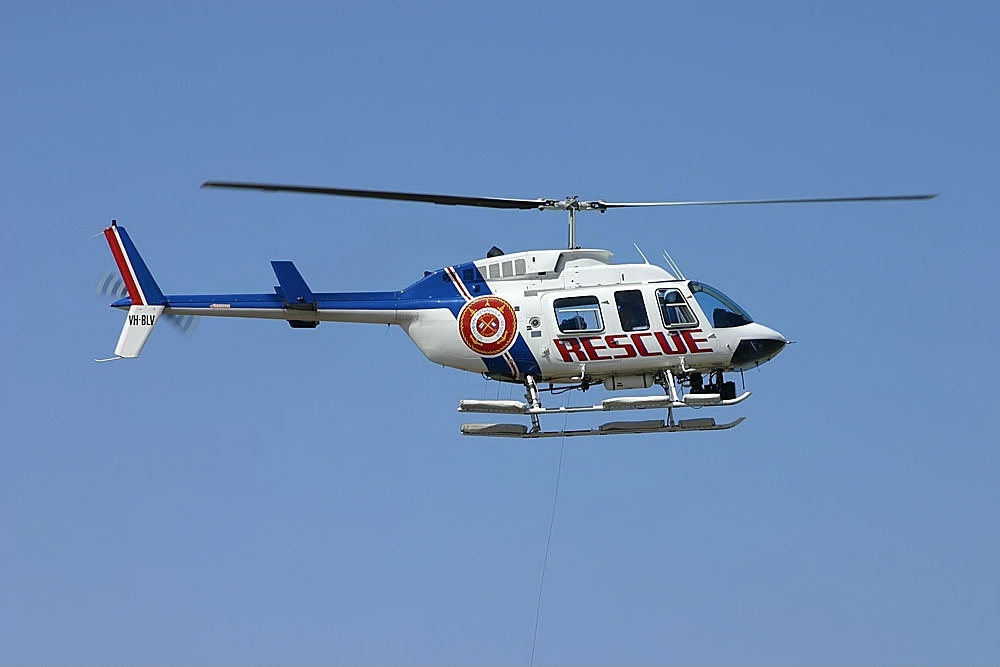
- A Bell 206L-3 similar to the aircraft involved in the accident

Occurrence
- Date: 24 July 2000
- Summary: Fuel starvation
- Site: Marlborough, Queensland

Aircraft
- Aircraft type: Bell 206L-3 LongRanger
- Aircraft name: Rescue 9
- Operator: Capricorn Helicopter Rescue Service
- Registration: VH-FFI
- Flight origin: Rockhampton, Queensland
- 1st stopover: "Yaraandoo Station"
- Destination: Marlborough, Queensland
- Occupants: 5
- Passengers: 2
- Crew: 3
- Fatalities: 5
- Survivors: 0

On 24 July 2000, a Bell Helicopter Company 206L-3 LongRanger rescue helicopter, owned by Grant Kenny Ocean Helicopters and leased by the Capricorn Helicopter Rescue Service, crashed at Marlborough, Queensland, killing all five people on board.

== Summary ==
At 11:40pm on 23 July 2000, pilot Paul "Paddy" O'Brien with two paramedics, departed Rockhampton, Queensland on the Capricorn Helicopter Rescue Service's "Rescue 9" aircraft, bound for "Yaraandoo Station" (Note: Yaraandoo is spelt incorrectly in the ATSB investigation.), a cattle property 200 kilometres (120 mi) north-west of the city, to retrieve a five year old patient who was suffering from croup, and his mother.

After collecting the patient and his mother, they departed the property at 1:14am on 24 July 2000, destined for Rockhampton Base Hospital.

However, at 1:32am, in radio communications the pilot observed the helicopter's "fairly high fuel burn rate" and decided instead to divert to the nearby township of Marlborough, on the Bruce Highway. The pilot requested the local Queensland Ambulance Service officer meet the helicopter at Marlborough so the patient could be transported to Rockhampton by road.

The ambulance was deployed to meet the helicopter at the sports field at Marlborough State School.

Thick fog had developed at Marlborough prior to the helicopter's arrival and the pilot requested that the ambulance officer ensured he had all of his vehicle's external flashing lights turned on.

The helicopter arrived at Marlborough at 1:41am and the pilot proceeded to make a series of unsuccessful attempts at landing the aircraft in the thick fog.

At 2:03am, the helicopter crashed 1 kilometre (0.62 mi) north-west of the Marlborough township, in a paddock on a property called "Kenela Park".

The ambulance officer, local State Emergency Service volunteers, the local Queensland Police Service officer and local residents immediately began searching for the crash site, but due to the dense fog, it took over an hour for the wreckage to be discovered.

== ATSB investigation ==
On 23 May 2002, the Australian Transport Safety Bureau released their findings following their investigation.

Their investigation outlined that a significant factor which likely led to the accident was that the helicopter departed Rockhampton with insufficient fuel for the intended flight, and that the supply of the remaining useable fuel could have been interrupted depending on how the pilot had been manoeuvring the aircraft while attempting to land which would have caused a loss of power to the engine. However, the investigation was unable to determine why the pilot was unable to safely land the helicopter after the loss of power.

The investigation also found that the thick fog which had enveloped the township of Marlborough would have denied the pilot visual reference with the ground while attempting to land, which may have been aggravated by the helicopter's illuminated search light which may have resulted in whiteout conditions by reflecting off the fog droplets.

According to the ATSB, another significant factor was the pilot's decision not to divert away from Marlborough to look for a fog-free landing site.

== Coronial inquest ==
A coronial inquest held at the Rockhampton District Court in 2003 also found that a lack of fuel and the heavy fog were the causes of the crash, and a recommendation was made to independently review the aeromedical retrieval system.

== Legacy ==
Following the tragedy, the community of Marlborough raised enough funds to construct a helipad in the town to be used by the rescue helicopter in an attempt to prevent a similar accident from happening in the future.

The city of Rockhampton and the township of Marlborough have both commemorated the disaster a number of times, including on the 10th anniversary in 2010 and on the 20th anniversary in 2020.
