= Pepsi Live =

The Pepsi Chart (later known as Pepsi Live) was a music show on Network Ten that consisted of live performances both from Sydney, Australia and London, United Kingdom. Each show would end up with a look at the top 10 singles in Australia.

Originally it was hosted by Tory Mussett, after which Dylan Lewis took over presenting duties. Other past hosts include Cherie Hausler.

== List of Performers ==
Some of the artists who performed on The Pepsi Chart included

- Alex Lloyd
- All Saints
- Anastacia
- Anuj
- Bardot
- Britney Spears
- Christine Anu
- Destiny's Child
- Five
- Groove Terminator
- Human Nature
- Killing Heidi
- M2M
- Madison Avenue
- Melanie C
- N'Sync
- No Doubt
- Reef
- Ricky Martin
- Robbie Williams
- Shihad
- Sonique
- Sophie Ellis-Bextor
- Steps
- Tina Cousins

== See also ==
- List of Australian music television shows
