= 2004 in Australia =

- Monarch: Elizabeth II
- Governor-General: Michael Jeffery
- Prime minister: John Howard
- Population: 20,091,504
- Elections: Queensland, Federal, ACT

The following lists events that happened during 2004 in Australia.

- Decades: 1980s; 1990s; 2000s; 2010s; 2020s
- See also: 2004 in Australian television; 2004 in Australian literature; Other events of 2004; Federal election; Timeline of Australian history

== Incumbents ==
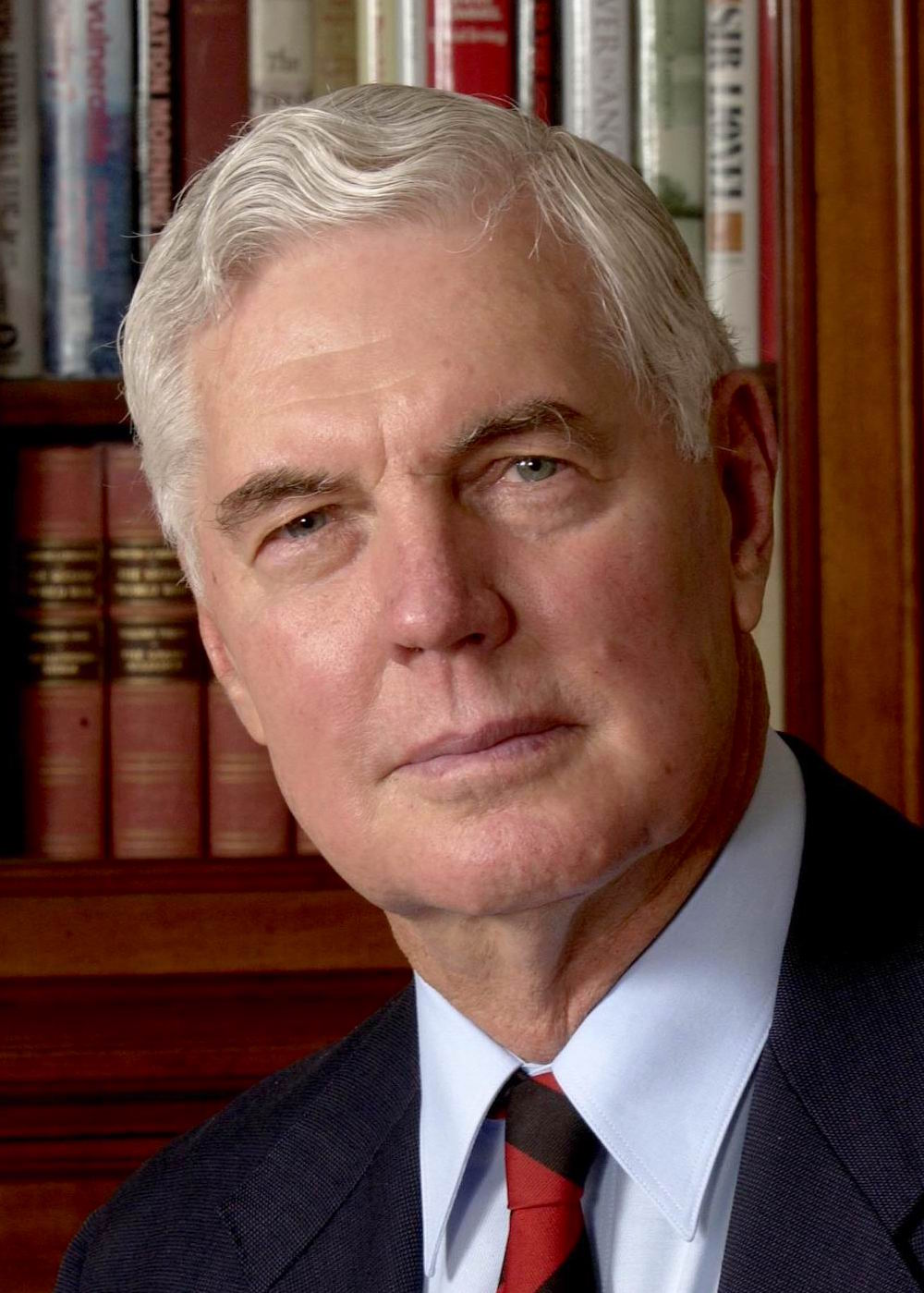
Michael Jeffery

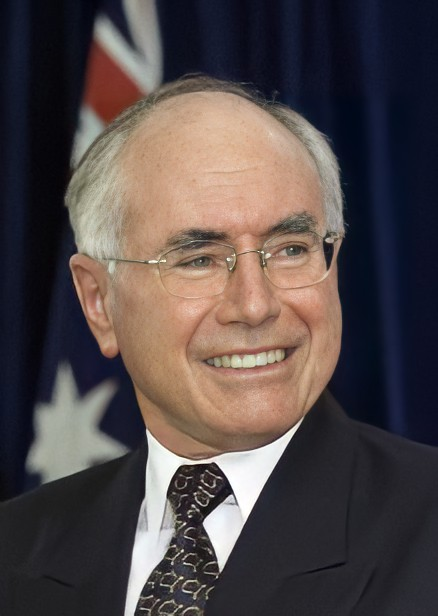
John Howard

- Monarch – Elizabeth II
- Governor-General – Michael Jeffery
- Prime Minister – John Howard
  - Deputy Prime Minister – John Anderson
  - Opposition Leader – Mark Latham
- Chief Justice – Murray Gleeson

=== State and territory leaders ===
- Premier of New South Wales – Bob Carr
  - Opposition Leader – John Brogden
- Premier of Queensland – Peter Beattie
  - Opposition Leader – Lawrence Springborg
- Premier of South Australia – Mike Rann
  - Opposition Leader – Rob Kerin
- Premier of Tasmania – Jim Bacon (until 21 March), then Paul Lennon
  - Opposition Leader – Rene Hidding
- Premier of Victoria – Steve Bracks
  - Opposition Leader – Robert Doyle
- Premier of Western Australia – Geoff Gallop
  - Opposition Leader – Colin Barnett
- Chief Minister of the Australian Capital Territory – Jon Stanhope
  - Opposition Leader – Brendan Smyth
- Chief Minister of the Northern Territory – Clare Martin
  - Opposition Leader – Terry Mills
- Chief Minister of Norfolk Island – Geoffrey Gardner

=== Governors and administrators ===
- Governor of New South Wales – Marie Bashir
- Governor of Queensland – Quentin Bryce
- Governor of South Australia – Marjorie Jackson-Nelson
- Governor of Tasmania – Richard Butler (until 9 August), then William Cox (from 15 December)
- Governor of Victoria – John Landy
- Governor of Western Australia – John Sanderson
- Administrator of the Australian Indian Ocean Territories – Evan Williams
- Administrator of Norfolk Island – Grant Tambling
- Administrator of the Northern Territory – Ted Egan

== Events ==
=== January ===
- 2 January – "Crocodile Hunter" Steve Irwin feeds a crocodile at his famous Australia Zoo while holding his one-month-old baby son, Robert Irwin. The incident generates a great deal of criticism both nationally and internationally over the next few days.
- 8 January – 33 asylum seekers detained on Nauru decide to suspend their month-long hunger strike after hearing of plans for an Australian medical team to travel to the island.
- 13 January – Spirit of Tasmania III makes its inaugural trip from Sydney to Devonport.
- 16 January –
  - Prime Minister John Howard discusses the issues of security and missile defense with the United States Chairman of Joint Chief of Staff, General Richard Myers.
  - Queensland Premier Peter Beattie announces an election date of 7 February.
- 19 January – Cricketer David Hookes died after a fight outside a Melbourne pub.
- 23 January – The Queensland Crime and Misconduct Commission has found no evidence of any misconduct by the state's police or judiciary, or by politicians including Premier Peter Beattie and Federal MP Tony Abbott, in relation to the jailing last year of Pauline Hanson and David Ettridge.
- 28 January –
  - Port Kembla ethanol explosion
  - Prime Minister John Howard and Foreign Minister Alexander Downer call for a sporting boycott in Zimbabwe.

=== February ===
- 1 February – The first Ghan passenger train across Australia from Adelaide to Darwin sets off on its three-day journey.
- 6 February – The Music Industry Piracy Investigations organization uses an Anton Piller order to raid offices of P2P companies Sharman Networks and Brilliant Digital Entertainment, the homes of their key executives, as well as several internet service providers and universities.
- 8 February – Peter Beattie's Australian Labor Party Queensland state government is re-elected in a landslide.
- 11 February – A Black Hawk helicopter reportedly crashed near RAAF Base Amberley with at least five seriously injured.
- 14 February – Riots break out between police and Aboriginal residents of Sydney suburb Redfern
- 15 February – Violent riots ensue in the Sydney suburb of Redfern after an Aboriginal boy dies while allegedly fleeing police.
- 23 February – Premier of Tasmania Jim Bacon resigns after being diagnosed with inoperable lung cancer, handing power to his deputy, Paul Lennon.
- 25 February – Qantas launches its discount domestic airline, Jetstar.
- 29 February – Malcolm Turnbull controversially wins Liberal pre-selection for the federal seat of Wentworth, displacing sitting member Peter King.

=== March ===
- 3 March – A bottle of wine is discovered on board the Queensland Government jet when Indigenous Policy Minister Liddy Clark and her staff visit an alcohol-free Indigenous community at Lockhart River, about 800 km north of Cairns.
- 11 March – A Senate report on poverty is immediately dismissed by Prime Minister John Howard. The report shows between 2 and 3.5 million Australians, or up to 19 percent of the population, are living in poverty.
- 20 March – Van Tuong Nguyen is sentenced to death in the Singaporean High Court after being convicted of trafficking 396.2g of heroin into Singapore in December 2002.
- 27 March – Brisbane City Council Elections. Liberal candidate Campbell Newman becomes Lord Mayor of Brisbane defeating Labor candidate Tim Quinn, thus ending 13 years of Labor government in Brisbane.

=== April ===
- 5 April – Australia's biggest supplier of the potential explosive ammonium nitrate decides to pull the product from its stores in response to concerns it could be used by terrorists.
- 14 April – The Family Court allows a thirteen-year-old child, born female, to start preliminary hormone treatment: the child identifies as being male and has been suffering from gender identity disorder.
- 24 April – John Howard joins Australian troops in Baghdad for ceremonies honoring the country's war dead.

=== May ===
- 14 May – Hobart woman Mary Donaldson marries Frederick, Crown Prince of Denmark in Copenhagen to become Mary, Crown Princess of Denmark
- 18 May – The Australia-United States Free Trade Agreement is signed.
- 25 May – Jetstar commences operations with a maiden flight from Newcastle to Launceston via Melbourne.
- 29 May – Premier of Victoria Steve Bracks announces plans to amend the Victorian constitution with recognise Aboriginal people. It would be the first time a state formally recognized Aboriginals in its constitution.
- 31 May – The ABC airs an episode of "Play School" featuring a segment about a little girl and her two "mums". The segment was criticised for exposing children to issues of sexuality.

=== June ===
- 1 June – Australian Jennifer Hawkins wins the Miss Universe contest, held in Quito, Ecuador.

Defence Minister Robert Hill admits that his office knew of allegations of abuse of Iraqi prisoners.

- 2 June – Former Qantas baggage handler, 34-year-old Bilal Khazal, is arrested outside his home at Lakemba, in Sydney's south-west, charged with collecting or making documents likely to facilitate terrorist acts. It's the first time someone has been charged with this offense since the laws were passed in 2002.
- 3 June – President of the United States George W. Bush publicly supports Prime Minister John Howard and criticises Opposition Leader Mark Latham, sparking criticism from the Opposition for intervening in Australian domestic politics.
- 8 June – A post-mortem examination report is released which reveals that euthanasia crusader, Nancy Crick, had no cancer in her body at the time she took her life on 21 May 2002.
- 15 June – Prime Minister John Howard releases the Government's Energy Statement which introduced the term "Mandatory Renewable Energy Target", benchmarks set by the government for the amount of non-polluting energy that Australia uses. Australia's current target is two percent renewable energy.
- 16 June – Defence Minister Robert Hill releases his long-awaited statement to the Senate explaining how it was that he and Prime Minister, John Howard, misled Parliament over Defence knowledge of Iraqi prisoner abuse at Abu Ghraib prison.
- 24 June – Federal Sports Minister Rod Kemp releases details of an inquiry into sports doping. Retired Justice Robert Anderson has one week to question the five implicated cyclists, and use scientific testing to show Cycling Australia and the Australian Olympic Committee that the athletes have no case to answer.
- 25 June –
  - The New South Wales Government rushes new water laws through Parliament.
  - The Premier's Conference is held in Canberra.

=== July ===
- 2 July – Federal Opposition Leader Mark Latham denies having "king hit" a constituent when he was a councilor on Liverpool Council in Sydney during the 1980s.
- 5 July –
  - Australia and Thailand sign a free trade agreement.
  - Federal Opposition Leader Mark Latham calls an extraordinary media conference to deal with the circulating rumours about him.
- 23 July – South Australian National Party Karlene Maywald State mp, becomes minister for the River Murray and Minister for Water Security in the Rann Labor government. This represents the first political alliance between the Labor and National parties since the Albert Dunstan Victorian state government of 1935–43.
- 30 July – Australian cyclist, Jobie Dajka, is dropped from the Australian Athens Olympic team after he admitted to lying to the Robert Anderson doping inquiry. His DNA has been found on syringes and vials in the room of disgraced cyclist Mark French at the Australian Institute of Sport in Adelaide.

=== August ===
- 3 August – President George W. Bush signs the United States-Australia Free Trade Agreement Implementation Act into law.
- 6 August –
  - In a 4–3 ruling, the High Court finds that the existing immigration laws are valid and that failed asylum seekers who cannot be deported can be held in detention indefinitely.
  - The leader of the extreme right-wing Australian Nationalists Movement in Western Australia, Jack van Tongeren, is taken into custody by police. Police were seeking the self-proclaimed white supremacist to question him about racist graffiti attacks in Perth.
  - Gavin Hopper, former tennis coach of Mark Philippoussis, is sentenced in Melbourne over the indecent assault of one of his 14-year-old pupils at Wesley College.
- 9 August – Richard Butler, the controversial Governor of Tasmania, resigns.
- 13 August – The Australia-United States Free Trade Agreement Implementation Act is passed by the Senate, with amendments. The Labor Party had insisted on amendments designed to protect cheap generic medicine manufacturers.
- 16 August – Michael Scrafton, a former senior adviser to Peter Reith, reveals that he told John Howard on 7 November 2001 that the Children Overboard claim might be untrue. Mr. Howard said they only discussed the inconclusive nature of the video footage. In light of the new information, the Labor opposition called for a further inquiry, which was convened on 1 September.
- 17 August – Federal Opposition Leader Mark Latham is hospitalised after being diagnosed with pancreatitis.
- 20 August –
  - United States Ambassador to Australia, Tom Schieffer, makes it clear he expects Australia would help the United States defend Taiwan if China invaded Taiwan.
  - The New South Wales Independent Commission Against Corruption (ICAC) sends Premier Bob Carr a summons to appear before the commission on a charge of contempt. The Opposition called for his resignation.
- 29 August – John Howard announces that the 2004 federal election will take place on 9 October

=== September ===
- 1 September –
  - Senator George Brandis presents telephone records to the Senate Inquiry into the "Children Overboard" affair in a bid to discredit claims by former government adviser, Michael Scrafton, that he told Prime Minister, John Howard, that there was no evidence to support claims made about asylum seekers throwing their children into the sea.
  - Prime Minister John Howard denies having lied to the Australian public about "children overboard".
  - Australian Olympic athletes returned from the Athens Olympic Games.
- 8 September – British Airways announces that it is selling its $1.1 billion stake in Qantas in order to cut debt and fund possible acquisitions. The sale ends an 11-year relationship between the two airlines.
- 9 September – A bomb blast outside the Australian embassy in Jakarta, Indonesia, kills eleven people and injures up to 100 people.
- 17 September – Federal Treasurer Peter Costello unveils the updated estimate of the national GST revenue. Prime Minister John Howard says the States will receive $3 billion more revenue than expected as a result.
- 29 September – Mark Latham officially launches the Labor Party's election campaign.
- 30 September – The President of Nauru, Ludwig Scotty, declared a state of emergency, dissolved Parliament and set an election date of 23 October.

=== October ===
- 9 October – The Liberal Party of Australia government of John Howard is returned for a fourth term at the 2004 federal election.
- 12 October –
  - Simon Crean resigns from the position of Shadow Treasurer, requesting a lesser portfolio, and John Faulkner resigns as Leader of the Opposition in the Senate in the aftermath of the Australian Labor Party's election loss.
  - Numerous Australians visit Kuta, Bali, to commemorate the second anniversary of October 2002 Bali bombing, with services being held across the nation.
- 14 October –
  - Annette Ellis stands down as Shadow Minister for Ageing, Seniors, and Disabilities.
  - The successful tenderer for Melbourne's Mitcham-Frankston Freeway is announced, with tolls due to be set at $4.43 for a one-way trip.

=== November ===
- 15 November – The Cairns Tilt Train derailment occurred at 11:55 pm, when the City of Townsville diesel tilt train derailed north of Berajondo, approximately 342 km (213 mi) north-west of Brisbane, Queensland.
- 26 November – A riot occurs on Palm Island leading to a complete break down of law and order with the 18 members of the Queensland Police barricading themselves in the local hospital.

=== December ===
- 7 December – Heavy rain causes flash flooding on Queensland's Gold Coast overnight. 200mm of rain fell in the afternoon and early evening.
- 26 December – 26 Australians are among the victims of the 2004 Indian Ocean tsunami, including the Australian football player Troy Broadbridge.

=== Full date unknown ===
- FaktorTel, an Australian-based communications company is founded.

== Arts and literature ==
- ARIA Music Awards of 2004
- Shirley Hazzard's novel The Great Fire wins the Miles Franklin Award
- Laurie Duggan is awarded the Australian Literature Society Gold Medal for Mangroves.
- Brian Castro's novel Shanghai Dancing wins the Christina Stead Prize for fiction.
- Annamarie Jagose's novel Slow Water wins the Vance Palmer Prize for Fiction.
- The Suitcase Royale, a theatre-comedy ensemble from Melbourne is formed.

== Film ==
- 28 February – Central City Studios, a five-studio film production complex, opens in the Melbourne Docklands.
- 29 February – Adam Elliot's short animated film Harvie Krumpet wins the 2003 Academy Award for Animated Short Film.
- Oyster Farmer

== Television ==
- 1 January – Australia's first Digital commercial free-to-air channel, Tasmanian Digital Television begins broadcasting in Hobart as a supplementary broadcaster to existing broadcasters Southern Cross Tasmania & WIN Television. On the same day, WIN TEN goes on air in the Mount Gambier & Riverland regions of South Australia as a supplementary broadcaster to existing solus broadcaster WIN Television.
- February – Deal or No Deal debuts its 5:30 pm timeslot on Seven.
- February – Top-rating game show Wheel of Fortune makes a super international revamp and a super new-look over to continue its long-run on Seven Local TV.
- 15 March – Foxtel launches its new digital service, Foxtel Digital.
- April – After 18 years at SBS, Margaret Pomeranz & David Stratton announce their resignation from the station to move to the ABC to present a new program, At the Movies. Four younger presenters replace them on The Movie Show – Megan Spencer, Fenella Kernebone & Jaimie Leonarder with Marc Fennell presenting a segment on newly released DVDs.
- 26 July – Broken Hill resident Trevor Butler proposes to his girlfriend immediately after winning A$1,000,000 on Big Brother
- 21 November – 16-year-old Casey Donovan wins the second series of Australian Idol defeating 21-year-old favourite, Anthony Callea
- 11 December – The Network Ten is the next Australian television network to introduce a watermark on its programs, although the watermark was broadcast on Ten News. It was located on the bottom left of the screens by TEN-10 Sydney before switching to the bottom right in 2006.

Ending this year:

- November – Burke's Backyard (1987–2004)
- November – Australia's Funniest Home Video Show (1990–1999, 2000–2004) (program comes back as Australia's Funniest Home Videos and revamps a new-look and new theme in 2005.)
- December – Cheez TV (1995–2004)

== Sport ==
- 6 January – Australian captain Steve Waugh retires from Test cricket, playing his last match against India at the Sydney Cricket Ground
- 26 February – First day of the Australian Track & Field Championships for the 2003–2004 season, which is held at the Sydney Olympic Park in Homebush Bay.
- 24 March – Sydney Kings defeat West Sydney Razorbacks 90–79 in Game 5 of the best-of-five NBL Grand Final series, becoming champions for the second time.
- 4 April – Minor Premiers Perth Glory defeat Parramatta Power 1–0 at Parramatta Stadium in the last NSL Grand Final, becoming National Champions for the second year in succession.
- At the Olympic Games in Athens, Greece, rower Sally Robbins collapses as the team is set to win bronze, relegating them out of the medals. She is mocked by the press & her teammates afterward.
- August – Australia brings home 50 medals, including a record 17 gold medals, from the 2004 Summer Olympics.
- 28 August – The Sydney Swifts defeat the Melbourne Phoenix 52–51 in the Commonwealth Bank Trophy netball grand final.
- 5 September — The Sydney Roosters win the minor premiership, following the conclusion of the final main round of the 2004 NRL season. The South Sydney Rabbitohs finish in last position, claiming the wooden spoon for the second year in a row.
- 12 September – Daniel Green wins the men's national marathon title, clocking 2:23:06 in Sydney, while Jenny Wickman claims the women's title in 2:55:09.
- 25 September – Port Adelaide (17.11.113) defeat the Brisbane Lions (10.13.73) to win the 108th VFL/AFL premiership. It is the first AFL premiership for Port Adelaide & the first grand final loss for Brisbane. It is also the first time 2 non-Victorian teams faced off in a grand final.
- 3 October – The Canterbury Bulldogs defeat the Sydney Roosters 16–13 to win the National Rugby League premiership. It marks a successful end to a controversial season for the Bulldogs, in which they were accused of sexual assault while in Coffs Harbour. The behavior from some of their fans at times also put the club in hot water. It is the Bulldogs' most recent premiership win.
- 10 October – Greg Murphy and Rick Kelly take consecutive victories by winning the 2003 Bathurst 1000 for the K-mart Racing Team. It was the sixth consecutive win for Holden, extending the longest winning streak for a manufacturer in the race's history.
- 29 October – Test cricket: Australia wins the third test against India, winning the Border–Gavaskar Trophy, and winning the first away test series against India since 1969.
- 2 November – Makybe Diva wins the Melbourne Cup horse racing event. It is the second consecutive Melbourne Cup win for the mare.

== Births ==
- 2 February – Lucia Field, dancer and singer
- 23 April – Teagan Croft, actress

== Deaths ==
- 3 January – Des Corcoran, 75, 37th Premier of South Australia
- 19 January – David Hookes, 48, cricketer
- 16 February – Shirley Strickland, 78, athlete, three-time Olympic champion
- 28 February – Jet Rowland, 1 (born 2002)
- 21 March – Elizabeth Essex-Cohen, 63, physicist
- 24 March – Rupert Hamer, 87, former Premier of Victoria
- 28 March – Percy Beames, 92, Australian rules footballer (Melbourne) and cricketer (b. 1911)
- 19 April – Tim Burstall, 76, film director and producer
- 26 May – Gatjil Djerrkura, 54, indigenous leader, Chairman of ATSIC
- 20 June – Jim Bacon, 54, former Premier of Tasmania
- 7 July – Xiaokai Yang, 55, economist
- 12 July – George Mallaby, 64, actor
- 17 August – Thea Astley, 78, novelist
- 22 August – Marcel Caux, 105, First World War veteran, last known survivor of the Battle of Pozières
- 4 September – Walter Campbell, 83, Governor of Queensland
- 11 October – Keith Miller, 84, cricketer, Australian rules footballer, fighter pilot and journalist
- 1 November – Marie Tehan, 64, Victorian health minister
- 6 November – Johnny Warren, 61, football (soccer) player, coach and ethnic community advocate
- 8 November – Eddie Charlton, 78, snooker player
- 19 November – Mulrunji, 36, Indigenous Australian resident of Palm Island who controversially died in custody.
- 20 November – Janine Haines, 59, Australian Democrats senator
- 20 November – Yvonne Aitken, 93, botanist
- 4 December – June Maston, 76, sprinter and athletics coach
- 26 December – Troy Broadbridge, 24, Australian football player, who died in the Indian Ocean Tsunami

== See also ==
- 2004 in Australian television
- List of Australian films of 2004
