= List of Australian films of 2002 =

Title	Director	Cast	Genre	Notes
Absolution	Andrew Lawrence		Short	
Angus	Nick Moore, Ann Nolan		Short	Won creative excellence in Melbourne International Film Festival
The Arsonist's Riddle	Ben West		Short animation	
The Asian Turtle Crisis	Elke Taylor		Short documentary	
Australia: Land Beyond Time	David Flatman		Short documentary	
Australian Rules	Paul Goldman	Kevin Harrington, Nathan Phillips, Luke Carroll	Drama	
Avoca	Nerida Moore			
Baggage Claim	Kate Riedl		Short drama	
The Bald and the Beautiful	Julie Nemcich	Short documentary		
Beast	Prue Dudley		Short	
The Beat Goes On	Stephen Vagg		Short	
Beginnings	Husein Alicajic			
Beneath Clouds	Ivan Sen	Dannielle Hall, Damian Pitt	Drama	Won Best Director at the 2002 AFI Awards
Bin Can Can	Steve Agland		Short animation/ Musical	
The Birthday Party	Samantha Rebillet		Short drama	
Bitzitulebocques			Short	
Black and White	Craig Lahiff	Ben Mendelsohn, David Ngoombujarra, Robert Carlyle, Charles Dance	Drama	2003 AFI Best Actor in Supporting Role
Black Talk	Wayne Blair		Short (12min)	Won Australian Short Film at the 2003 Sydney Film Festival
Blurred	Evan Clarry		Drama/Comedy	Nom. 2003 AFI for Best Screenplay, Adapted
Blow	Marie Craven		Short drama	
Boomerang	Carla Drago	Sarah Aubrey, Tom Long, Anthony Jensen, Matthew Grossman	Short/Comedy	Won 4 2002 Tropfest awards
Broken Allegiance	Nick Hallam	Paul Hooper, Niobe Dean	Short	
Cane-Toad: What Happened to Baz?				
CH Jones: The World's Most Hated Food				
China Face				
Choosing Exile: In the Footprints of a Stranger				
Chris, Not Krishna, Calling				
Chrono-logic				
Chrysalis				
Clouds Weep on the Greenness				
Code 2				
Contact				
Crackerjack	Paul Moloney	Mick Molloy, Bill Hunter, Frank Wilson, Monica Maughan, John Clarke, Lois Ramsey, Samuel Johnson, Judith Lucy, Cliff Ellen, Bob Hornery, Peter Aanensen, Esme Melville, John Flaus, Lois Collinder, Paul McCarthy, Teague Rook, Robyn Butler, Brett Swain, Tony Martin, Greg Francis, Andrew Gilmour, Earl Francis, Pete Smith		
Crazy Richard				
The Creepy Crawleys				
The Crocodile Hunter: Collision Course	John Stainton	Steve Irwin, Terri Irwin, Magda Szubanski, David Wenham, Lachy Hulme, Aden Young, Kate Beahan, Steve Bastoni, Steven Vidler, Alyson Standen, Alex Ruiz, David Franklin, Robert Coleby		
Daddy Boy				
Dances with Emus				
Dark Age of Light: Episode 01				
De l'autre côté				
Dig				
Dirty Deeds	David Caesar	Bryan Brown, Toni Collette, John Goodman, Sam Neill, Sam Worthington, Kestie Morassi, William McInnes, Andrew S. Gilbert, Garry Waddell, Felix Williamson, Bille Brown, Paul Chubb, Brett Hicks-Maitland, Sam Jacobson, Holly Jones, Shane McNamara, John McNeill, Chris Moody, Angelo Parisi, Tim Rogers, Andy Kent, Russell Hopkinson, David Lane, Tony Hicks		
Dog's Day				
The Doppelgangers				
East Timor: Birth of a Nation – Rosa's Story				
Eloise				
Enough				
Eve of Adha				
F.A.				
Family Affair				
Fashion Victim				
Finding Joy				
Flat				
The Flying Nut				
Fond Memories of Cuba				
Free				
From Deep It Came				
Garage Days	Alex Proyas	Kick Gurry, Maya Stange, Pia Miranda, Russell Dykstra, Chris Sadrinna, Andy Anderson (actor), Marton Csokas, Tiriel Mora, Holly Brisley		
The Gas Club				
Godmode				
Guardian				
Guru Wayne				
Half Sister				
The Hard Word	Scott Roberts	Guy Pearce, Rachel Griffiths, Joel Edgerton	Crime / Comedy	
Helga				
Help Me				
Her Outback				
Hetty				
High Street Love Story				
Hommes du jour				
Horses: The Story of Equus				
How Am I Driving				
I Love U				
Impressions				
In Blood				
In the Dark We Live				
Indefinable Moods				
The Inside Story				
Into the Night				
Invitation				
Island Rescue				
Jack				
Joe Bus				
Kabbarli				
Karmarama				
Lamb				
The Last Breadbox				
The Last Drop				
Late Night Shopper				
Leunig: How Democracy Actually Works				
Life at the End of the Rainbow	Wayne Coles-Janess		Documentary	
Love Story				
Lucky Day				
Making Venus				
The Merchant of Fairness				
Mother of an Attitude				
Murbah Swamp Beer			Short documentary	
New Skin				
The Nugget	Bill Bennett	Eric Bana, Stephen Curry, Dave O'Neil, Belinda Emmett, Peter Moon, Vince Colosimo, Max Cullen, Karen Pang, Sallyanne Ryan, Alan Brough, Jeff Truman, Chris Haywood, Jean Kittson, Glenda Linscott, Jane Hall, Hugh Bateman, Owen Bates, Alan Bennett, Henry Bennett, Nellie Bennett, Megan Bice, Bruce Chan, Mick Cleary, Jennifer Cluff, Mark Coric, Linda Cropper, Scott Etherington, George Hamilton, Scott McGregor, Matthew Riley, Michael Terry		
Of All Great Forces				
Once				
Only				
The Only Person in the World				
Ordinary People				
The Original Mermaid				
Other People				
The Pact				
Pillion				
The Projectionist				
Q				
Quentin				
The Quiet American	Phillip Noyce	Michael Caine, Brendan Fraser, Do Thi Hai Yen, Rade Serbedzija, Tzi Ma, Robert Stanton, Holmes Osborne, Quang Hai, Ferdinand Hoang, Pham Thi Mai Hoa, Mathias Mlekuz, Kevin Tran, Lap Phan, Tim Bennett, Jeff Truman, Hong Nhung, Ha Phong Nguyen, Navia Nguyen, Lucia Noyce, Hiliary Douglas, Daniel Hung, Kim Hoan Nguyen, Mai Nguyen Trinh, Pham Trong, Tran Do Luc, Cong Nguyen		
The Silence of Angels				
Rabbit-Proof Fence	Phillip Noyce	Everlyn Sampi, David Gulpilil, Kenneth Branagh	Drama	AACTA Award for Best Film
Rainbow Bird and Monster Man				
The Real Thing				
The Rotting Woman				
Roundabout				
Running Down These Dreams				
Schtick Happens				
Search				
Searching for Mr Right.Com				
Secret Bridesmaids' Business				
Shadow Play: Indonesia's Year of Living Dangerously				
Shhh.......				
The Shot				
Show and Tell				
Signs of Life				
Sisters of St John of God				
Six Days Straight				
Sixth Scent	Petrina Buckley	Petrina Buckley, Mark Jensen, Stephen Bach	Short / Comedy	
Size Does Matter				
Sketch				
Something About AJ				
Stranger in the Family				
Stuffed Bunny				
Stump				
Suburban Nightmare				
Sugar Inc.				
Surviving Shepherd's Pie				
Sway				
Sweet Dreams				
Tales from the Powder Room				
Teesh and Trude				
Tempe Tip				
Terminal Trance				
The Thing in the Roof				
Till Human Voices Wake Us				
The Tracker	Rolf de Heer	David Gulpilil, Gary Sweet		
Tragic Love				
Tre per sempre				
The Trials of Henry Kissinger				
Trojan Warrior				
Two Thirds Sky: Artists in Desert Country	Sean O'Brien	Peter Sharp (artist), Judy Watson, Jenny Sages, Idris Murphy, Gloria Petyarre	Documentary (52 mins)	2002 Nom. Film Critics Circle of Australia, AFI Awards, Dendy Awards, Gold - Australian Cinematographers Society NSW, Best Documentary Australian Teachers of Media Inc
The Visitor	Dan Castle		Short/Drama/Mystery (30min)	Nom. 2003 AFI Best Short Fiction Film, Won 2 2002 Seattle Lesbian & Gay Film Festival awards
Wait 'Til Your Father Gets Home	Martin Wilson	Mike Dorsey, Luke Hewitt, Deborah Kennedy, Barry Langrishe, Tamblyn Lord, Kyle Morrison	Short	
Walking on Water	Tony Ayres	Vince Colosimo, Maria Theodorakis	Comedy drama	
The War of Jenkins Ear	David Napier		Short drama	
Warriors of Virtue: The Return to Tao	Michael Vickerman	Jeff Carrara, Kevin Smith, Nathan Phillips, Nina Liu, Shedrack Anderson III, Fusen Chen, Xiongwei Chen, Zhu Chen, Carla Deaton, Shuntian Guan, Tian Le, Jonathan Tex Levitt, Ying Liang, Bao Cheng Li, Jianquo Li	Fantasy	
Wash Dark Colors Separately	Chee Lam		Short	
Wasted on the Young	Keri Light		Short comedy	
The Way Back	Samuel MacGeorge			
A Wedding in Ramallah	Sherine Salama		Documentary	
Weeping Willow	Adrian Wills		Short drama	
Whispering in the Dark	Lynne B. Williams		Short drama	
Wilfred				
Window Shopper				
Your Brother, My Tidda	Kelrick Martin		Short documentary	
ZTS: State of Entropy	Stefanos Stefanidis		Drama	

== See also ==
- 2002 in Australia
- 2002 in Australian television
- List of 2002 box office number-one films in Australia
