= 2002 in Australian television =

== Events ==
- 25 January – Richard Morecroft reads his last ABC News bulletin. He is replaced the following Monday by Tony Eastley.
- 4 February – Nine cast members from All Saints participate in The Weakest Link: All Saints Special to mark the first and only anniversary of The Weakest Link in Australia. Erik Thomson wins the special, but his winnings are unknown.
- 11 February – The Nine Network's post-Sale of the Century replacement, Shafted hosted by former Hey Hey It's Saturday member Red Symons premieres. After dismal ratings the show is cancelled in April the same year. On the same day the network's post-Burgo's Catch Phrase replacement Pass the Buck, a new game show based on the UK game show containing a word association premieres leading into Nine's most-watched 6pm news bulletin, After dismal ratings the show is cancelled in May the same year.
- 20 February – American science fiction fantasy series Star Trek: Enterprise premieres on the Nine Network.
- 11 March – The Seven Network's Docklands studios in Melbourne is open, with the first Seven News Melbourne news bulletin being broadcast from the centre. This leads to a national relaunch of the Seven News brand with new sets and graphics in most cities. Also on that day, the nine remaining contestants from the third season of The Mole take part in a special episode of The Weakest Link for a chance to add $100,000 to the prize kitty. The team performed well against expectations, winning only $14,100, the lowest amount ever won on the Seven iteration of the show. On The Mole, this figure is rounded up to $15,000. The show was cancelled one month later after dismal ratings.
- 6 March – Foxtel introduces a new sports channel called Fox Footy Channel. It runs until 1 October 2006.
- 20 March – Tim Lane resigns from the Nine Network following a disagreement in regards to commentating AFL matches with Eddie McGuire involving the Collingwood Football Club. Lane defects to rival Network Ten in 2003, where he remained until Ten lost the rights at the end of 2011.
- 28 March – The Nine Network televises its first AFL game until Nine lost the TV rights at the end of 2006.
- 30 March – The Western Front premieres on Network Ten in Perth and was hosted by Tim Gossage and Lachy Reid.
- 30 March – Network Ten televises its first AFL game until Ten lost the TV rights at the end of 2011.
- 8 April – The Nine Network moves American comedy series Frasier to its 7:00 pm weeknight timeslot after the post-Sale of the Century replacement, Shafted was axed following bad ratings.
- 8 April – Australian media analysis television program Media Watch returns to air on the ABC several months after the broadcaster had removed its former managing director Jonathan Shier with David Marr taking over as host as Paul Barry had been sacked by Shier in 2000 following its cancellation.
- 24 April – Crystal-Rose Cluff wins the third season of The Mole, taking home $108,000 in prize money. Alaina Taylor is revealed as the Mole, and Marc Jongebloed is the runner-up.
- 2 May – Final episode of the Australian drama series (which is the very first television series in Australia to be filmed in widescreen) Something in the Air airs on ABC.
- 16 May – Kath & Kim premieres on the ABC and is a surprise hit. It was picked up by the Seven Network in 2007.
- 24 May – The Seven Network axes vintage episodes of Home and Away due to very bad ratings.
- 27 May – The American comedy-drama series M*A*S*H debuts its 5.00pm timeslot on the Seven Network.
- 10 June – Australian travel magazine series The Great Outdoors moves to one hour at 7.30pm Mondays on the Seven Network.
- 1 July – Peter Corbett wins the second season of Big Brother.
- 2 July – American science fiction fantasy series Smallville premieres on the Nine Network.
- 17 July – The Australian drama series Young Lions premieres on the Nine Network.
- 26 July – Mixy ends after 4-year run and it will be replaced by children's weekday morning and afternoon blocks on the ABC.
- 6 August – Eddie McGuire and Catriona Rowntree host Test Australia: The National IQ Test, a one-off special on the Nine Network. With 2.779 million metropolitan viewers, it became the top-rating program of 2002.
- 8 August – The American action drama series 24 premieres on the Seven Network.
- 12 August –
  - After being cancelled in 2001, Burgo's Catch Phrase relaunches on the Nine Network and is a surprise hit, with new graphics, new theme music and new prizes with the contestant backdrop increased to three people with the game show been produced by Southern Star Endemol, leading into Nine's most-watched 6pm news bulletin.
  - TV and radio personality Dylan Lewis is voted winner of Celebrity Big Brother.
  - The Australian drama series White Collar Blue premieres on Network Ten.
- September – SBS launches its first Digital channel, the SBS World News Channel.
- 1 September – The Nine Network undergoes a revamp to change their on-air graphics, including changing their dots back to spears as well as the numeral becoming 3D for the colour-coded days.
- 30 September – The Wiggles return to television with a brand new television series called Lights, Camera, Action, Wiggles! airing for the first time ever on ABC.
- 4 October – Beyblade premieres on Fox Kids and two weeks later on Network Ten as part of Cheez TV. Also that day, David Koch takes over from Chris Reason as co-host of Sunrise, a role which he would hold until June 2023.
- 29 November – Brian Henderson retires from reading Sydney's National Nine News after four decades. He is replaced the following Monday by Jim Waley, who manages to keep the bulletin on top of the ratings in Sydney for the next two years.
- 2 December – Jim Waley presents his weeknight bulletin from Sydney’s National Nine News which replaced the retired Brian Henderson.
- 5 December - The American comedy-drama series Scrubs premieres on the Seven Network.

== Channels ==
=== New channels ===
- 6 March – Fox Footy Channel

=== Defunct channels ===
- 30 November – Oh! (replaced by FOX8 on Optus Television)

== Premieres ==
=== Domestic series ===
| Program | Channel | Debut date |
|---|---|---|
| The Garden Gurus | Nine Network | 2 February |
| Shafted | Nine Network | 11 February |
| Pass the Buck | Nine Network | 11 February |
| Auction Squad | Seven Network | 13 February |
| Australian Survivor | Nine Network | 13 February |
| Tracey McBean | ABC TV, ABC Kids (digital only) | 18 February |
| Fear Factor | Nine Network | 19 February |
| Saturday Night Footy | Network Ten | 30 March |
| Kath & Kim | ABC TV | 16 May |
| Old Tom | ABC TV, ABC Kids (digital only) | 6 June |
| Young Lions | Nine Network | 17 July |
| Celebrity Big Brother | Network Ten | 21 July |
| MDA | ABC TV | 23 July |
| Test Australia: The National IQ Test | Nine Network | 6 August |
| White Collar Blue | Network Ten | 12 August |
| Creature Features | ABC TV, ABC Kids (digital only) | 9 September |
| CNNNN | ABC TV | 19 September |
| Lights, Camera, Action, Wiggles! | ABC TV, ABC Kids (digital only) | 30 September |
| Don't Blame Me | Nine Network | 6 October |
| Fairy Tale Police Department | Seven Network | 18 October |
| Mornings with Kerri-Anne | Nine Network | 28 October |
| Bad Cop, Bad Cop | ABC TV | 18 November |

=== International series ===
| Program | Channel | Debut date |
|---|---|---|
| (United States) Level 9 | Nine Network | 4 January |
| (South Africa) Yizo Yizo | SBS TV | 5 January |
| (United Kingdom) Two Thousand Acres of Sky | Seven Network | 6 January |
| (United States) The Strip | Nine Network | 7 January |
| (United States) Hitler's Holocaust | SBS TV | 10 January |
| (United States) / (United Kingdom) Secrets of the Dead | SBS TV | 13 January |
| (United States) The Cindy Margolis Show | Nine Network | 14 January |
| (United Kingdom) Vampires, Pirates and Aliens | ABC TV, ABC Kids (digital only) | 30 January |
| (New Zealand) Atlantis High | ABC Kids (digital only) | 4 February |
| (United Kingdom) Merlin the Magical Puppy | ABC TV, ABC Kids (digital only) | 4 February |
| (United Kingdom) Busy Buses | ABC TV, ABC Kids (digital only) | 4 February |
| (United Kingdom) The Hoobs | ABC TV, ABC Kids (digital only) | 4 February |
| (United Kingdom) Eddy and the Bear | ABC Kids (digital only) | 4 February |
| (United Kingdom) Little Ghosts | ABC TV, ABC Kids (digital only) | 4 February |
| (United Kingdom) The Famous Five (1995) | ABC Kids (digital only) | 5 February |
| (United Kingdom) The Adventures of Dawdle the Donkey | ABC Kids (digital only) | 9 February |
| (United Kingdom) Black Books | ABC TV | 14 February |
| (United Kingdom) The Six Wives of Henry VIII | ABC TV | 17 February |
| (United Kingdom) North Square | ABC TV | 20 February |
| (United States) Star Trek: Enterprise | Nine Network | 20 February |
| (Japan) Digimon Tamers | Network Ten | 26 February |
| (Canada) / (United Kingdom) Don't Eat the Neighbours | ABC TV, ABC Kids (digital only) | 7 March |
| (United Kingdom) The Kumars at No. 42 | ABC TV | 21 March |
| (Spain) Connie the Cow | ABC TV, ABC Kids (digital only) | 17 April |
| (Canada) / (Australia) Guinevere Jones | Network Ten | 4 May |
| (Canada) Rescue Heroes | Network Ten | 6 May |
| (United Kingdom) Night and Day | ABC TV | 7 May |
| (United States) The Legend of Tarzan | Seven Network | 18 May |
| (United Kingdom) Angelina Ballerina | ABC TV, ABC Kids (digital only) | 27 May |
| (United Kingdom) / (Canada) The Amazing Adrenalini Brothers (shorts) | ABC TV, ABC Kids (digital only) | 2 June |
| (United Kingdom) Fourways Farm | ABC Kids (digital only) | 6 June |
| (Wales) / (United Kingdom) Starhill Ponies | ABC Kids (digital only) | 6 June |
| (Japan) / (United States) Transformers: Robots in Disguise (2001) | Network Ten | 9 June |
| (United Kingdom) Sir Gadabout: The Worst Knight in the Land | ABC TV, ABC Kids (digital only) | 10 June |
| (United Kingdom) Molly's Gang | ABC Kids (digital only) | 10 June |
| (United Kingdom) Dog and Duck | ABC Kids (digital only) | 10 June |
| (United Kingdom) Construction Site | ABC Kids (digital only) | 12 June |
| (United States) Teacher's Pet | Seven Network | 22 June |
| (Canada) / (United States) Queer as Folk | SBS TV | 1 July |
| (United States) Smallville | Nine Network | 2 July |
| (United Kingdom) The Way We Live Now (2001) | ABC TV | 7 July |
| (United Kingdom) The Book Group | ABC TV | 12 July |
| (Canada) / (United States) Cyberchase | ABC TV, ABC Kids (digital only) | 15 July |
| (United States) SpongeBob SquarePants | Network Ten | 12 August |
| (Canada) Caillou | ABC TV, ABC Kids (digital only) | 15 August |
| (United States) Baby Blues | Nine Network | 31 August |
| (United States) Band of Brothers | Nine Network | 2 September |
| (Japan) Medabots | Network Ten | 14 September |
| (Canada) The Ripping Friends | Fly TV (digital only) | 14 September |
| (United Kingdom) Pongwiffy | ABC TV, ABC Kids (digital only) | 16 September |
| (Canada) Olliver's Adventures | ABC TV, ABC Kids (digital only) | 16 September |
| (United Kingdom) Engie Benjy | ABC TV, ABC Kids (digital only) | 16 September |
| (Japan) Zoids: Chaotic Century | Network Ten | 17 September |
| (United States) Curb Your Enthusiasm | Nine Network | 23 September |
| (United Kingdom) Small Potatoes (1999) | ABC TV | 3 October |
| (Japan) Beyblade | Network Ten | 14 October |
| (Canada) Anne of Green Gables: The Animated Series | Network Ten | 12 October |
| (United States) The Adventures of Jimmy Neutron: Boy Genius | Network Ten | 18 October |
| (United States) Dr. Phil | Nine Network | 21 October |
| (United Kingdom) / (Canada) Ace Lightning | ABC TV, ABC Kids (digital only) | 22 October |
| (United Kingdom) Bounty Hamster | ABC TV, ABC Kids (digital only) | 4 November |
| (United Kingdom) Andy Pandy (2002) | ABC TV, ABC Kids (digital only) | 7 November |
| (United Kingdom) Foyle's War | ABC TV | 8 November |
| (United Kingdom) Teletubbies Everywhere | ABC TV, ABC Kids (digital only) | 2 December |
| (United States) / (Canada) The Dead Zone | Nine Network | 2 December |
| (United Kingdom) Mr. Bean: The Animated Series | ABC TV | 3 December |
| (United States) Scrubs | Seven Network | 5 December |
| (United States) Archie's Weird Mysteries | Seven Network | 7 December |
| (France) Funny Little Bugs | ABC TV, ABC Kids (digital only) | 9 December |
| (France) / (Canada) X-DuckX | ABC TV, ABC Kids (digital only) | 23 December |
| (United Kingdom) The Adventures of Mole | Seven Network | 26 December |
| (United Kingdom) The Adventures of Toad | Seven Network | 27 December |
| (United Kingdom) Animal Ark | ABC Kids (digital only) | 2002 |
| (United Kingdom) / (Canada) / (United States) Anthony Ant | ABC Kids (digital only) | 2002 |
| (United Kingdom) / (Scotland) / (Denmark) / (Canada) Upstairs, Downstairs Bears | ABC Kids (digital only) | 2002 |
| (France) / (Canada) / (United Kingdom) Blazing Dragons | ABC Kids (digital only) | 2002 |
| (New Zealand) Buzz and Poppy | ABC TV, ABC Kids (digital only) | 2002 |
| (United Kingdom) Oscar Charlie | ABC TV, ABC Kids (digital only) | 2002 |
| (United Kingdom) Binka | ABC TV, ABC Kids (digital only) | 2002 |
| (United Kingdom) Snailsbury Tales | ABC TV, ABC Kids (digital only) | 2002 |
| (United States) Oswald | ABC TV, ABC Kids (digital only) | 2002 |
| (United Kingdom) / (United States) Slim Pig | ABC TV, ABC Kids (digital only) | 2002 |
| (United Kingdom) The Wheels on the Bus | ABC Kids (digital only) | 2002 |
| (United Kingdom) / (Canada) Simon in the Land of Chalk Drawings (2002) | ABC TV, ABC Kids (digital only) | 2002 |
| (Canada) / (China) Henry's World | ABC TV, ABC Kids (digital only) | 2002 |
| (United Kingdom) The Fantastic Flying Journey | ABC Kids (digital only) | 2002 |
| (United Kingdom) Mopatop's Shop | ABC Kids (digital only) | 2002 |
| (Denmark) Skipper & Skeeto | ABC Kids (digital only) | 2002 |
| (United Kingdom) Microscopic Milton | ABC Kids (digital only) | 2002 |
| (Germany) Letters from Felix | ABC Kids (digital only) | 2002 |
| (United Kingdom) Coupling | ABC TV | 2002 |
| (United States) 24 | Seven Network | 2002 |
| (United States) Sheena | Network Ten | 2002 |
| (United Kingdom) The Queen's Nose | ABC Kids (digital only) | 2002 |
| (United States) / (United Kingdom) Clifford the Big Red Dog | Nine Network | 2002 |
| (United Kingdom) Footballers' Wives | Network Ten | 2002 |
| (Canada) Amazon | Nine Network | 2002 |
| (United Kingdom) Dog Eat Dog | Seven Network | 2002 |
| (United States) Really Wild Animals | ABC Kids (digital only) | 2002 |
| (United States) Freakylinks | Nine Network | 2002 |
| (United States) / (France) / (Canada) Dark Realm | Nine Network | 2002 |
| (United Kingdom) Hollywood 7 | Seven Network | 2002 |
| (United States) Hype | Nine Network | 2002 |
| (United States) Big Bag | ABC Kids (digital only) | 2002 |

==== Subscription television ====
===== Domestic =====
| Program | Channel | Debut date |
|---|---|---|
| A Day in the Life | Arena | 20 February |

===== International =====
| Program | Channel | Debut date |
|---|---|---|
| (United States) The Osbournes | MTV | 4 April |
| (Japan) Shinzo | Fox Kids | 8 April |
| (United States) Time Squad | Cartoon Network | 3 May |
| (United States) Justice League | Cartoon Network | 8 June |
| (United Kingdom) / (United States) / (Canada) The Cramp Twins | Cartoon Network | 1 July |
| (United States) The Adventures of Jimmy Neutron: Boy Genius | Nickelodeon | 26 July |
| (Japan) Zoids: Chaotic Century | Cartoon Network | 2 September |
| (Japan) Beyblade | Fox Kids | 4 October |
| (United Kingdom) The Story of Tracy Beaker | Nickelodeon | 18 October |
| (United Kingdom) Fun at the Funeral Parlor | UKTV | 22 October |
| (United States) The Anna Nicole Show | Arena | 5 November |
| (United Kingdom) Lenny Henry in Pieces | UKTV | 9 November |
| (Japan) Yu-Gi-Oh! | Nickelodeon | 2002 |
| (United States) The Fairly OddParents! | Nickelodeon | 2002 |
| (United States) Invader Zim | Nickelodeon | 2002 |
| (United States) Kim Possible | Disney Channel | 2002 |

== Specials ==
| Program | Channel | Debut date |
|---|---|---|
| (United States) 2002 Country Music Association Awards | Main Event | 7 November |

=== Free-to-air premieres ===
This is a list of programs which made their premiere on Australian free-to-air television that had previously premiered on Australian subscription television. Programs may still air on the original subscription television network.

==== International ====
| Program | Free-to-air network | Subscription network | Date |
|---|---|---|---|
| (United States) The Osbournes | Network Ten | MTV | 1 July |

=== Subscription premieres ===
This is a list of programs which made their premiere on Australian subscription television that had previously premiered on Australian free-to-air television. Programs may still air on the original free-to-air television network.

==== Domestic ====
| Program | Subscription network | Free-to-air network | Date |
|---|---|---|---|
| Li'l Horrors | Fox Kids | Seven Network | 2002 |

==== International ====
| Program | Subscription network | Free-to-air network | Date |
|---|---|---|---|
| (Australia) / (Canada) The Saddle Club | Fox Kids | ABC TV | 2002 |
| (United States) Saved by the Bell: The College Years | Nickelodeon | Seven Network | 5 October |
| (United States) Mary-Kate and Ashley in Action! | Nickelodeon | | 14 October |

=== Changes to network affiliation ===
This is a list of programs which made their premiere on an Australian television network that had previously premiered on another Australian television network. The networks involved in the switch of allegiances are predominantly both free-to-air networks or both subscription television networks. Programs that have their free-to-air/subscription television premiere, after previously premiering on the opposite platform (free-to air to subscription/subscription to free-to air) are not included. In some cases, programs may still air on the original television network. This occurs predominantly with programs shared between subscription television networks.

==== Domestic ====
| Program | New network(s) | Previous network(s) | Date |
|---|---|---|---|
| Elly & Jools | ABC Kids (digital only) | Nine Network | 23 February |
| Lizzie's Library | ABC Kids (digital only) | ABC TV | 2002 |

==== International ====
| Program | New network(s) | Previous network(s) | Date |
|---|---|---|---|
| (Canada) The Zack Files | ABC TV | ABC Kids (digital only) | 27 February |
| (Canada) / (China) George Shrinks | ABC TV | ABC Kids (digital only) | 1 April |
| (Japan) Sailor Moon | Network Ten | Seven Network | 12 April |
| (United Kingdom) Percy the Park Keeper | ABC TV, ABC Kids (digital only) | Nine Network | 1 August |
| (United Kingdom) The Forgotten Toys (TV special) | Seven Network | ABC TV | 21 December |
| (United States) The New Adventures of Madeline | Seven Network | ABC TV | 22 December |
| (United Kingdom) The First Snow of Winter | Seven Network | ABC TV | 24 December |
| (United States) Harry and the Hendersons | Network Ten | ABC TV | 2002 |
| (Canada) The Kids of Degrassi Street | ABC Kids (digital only) | ABC TV | 2002 |
| (Canada) Katie and Orbie | ABC Kids (digital only) | ABC TV | 2002 |
| (United Kingdom) / (France) The Animals of Farthing Wood | ABC Kids (digital only) | ABC TV | 2002 |
| (Canada) / (France) Babar | ABC Kids (digital only) | ABC TV | 2002 |
| (Spain) Koki | ABC Kids (digital only) | ABC TV | 2002 |
| (United States) Barney & Friends | ABC Kids (digital only) | Nine Network | 2002 |
| (United Kingdom) Bananaman | ABC Kids (digital only) | ABC TV | 2002 |
| (United Kingdom) Byker Grove | ABC Kids (digital only) | ABC TV | 2002 |
| (United States) Bump in the Night | ABC Kids (digital only) | ABC TV | 2002 |
| (United Kingdom) The Greedysaurus Gang | ABC Kids (digital only) | ABC TV | 2002 |
| (Canada) Degrassi Junior High | ABC Kids (digital only) | ABC TV | 2002 |
| (United Kingdom) Monty | ABC Kids (digital only) | ABC TV | 2002 |
| (United Kingdom) True Tilda | ABC Kids (digital only) | ABC TV | 2002 |

== Ending / resting this year ==
| Date | Show | Channel | Debut |
|---|---|---|---|
| 11 January | Cybergirl | Network Ten | 21 July 2001 |
| 22 April | The Weakest Link | Seven Network | 5 February 2001 |
| 2 May | Something in the Air | ABC TV | 17 January 2000 |
| 7 July | Halifax f.p. | Seven Network | 9 October 1994 |
| 26 July | Mixy | ABC TV | 16 February 1998 |
| 29 September | All Aussie Adventures | Network Ten | 5 August 2001 |
| 14 November | BackBerner | ABC TV | 19 August 1999 |
| 18 December | Young Lions | Nine Network | 17 July 2002 |

== See also ==
- 2002 in Australia
- List of Australian films of 2002
