= 2002 in Australia =

- Monarch: Elizabeth II
- Governor-General: Peter Hollingworth
- Prime minister: John Howard
- Population: 19,640,979
- Elections: SA, TAS, VIC

The following lists events that happened during 2002 in Australia.

- Decades: 1980s; 1990s; 2000s; 2010s; 2020s
- See also: 2002 in Australian television; 2002 in Australian literature; Other events of 2002; Timeline of Australian history

== Incumbents ==
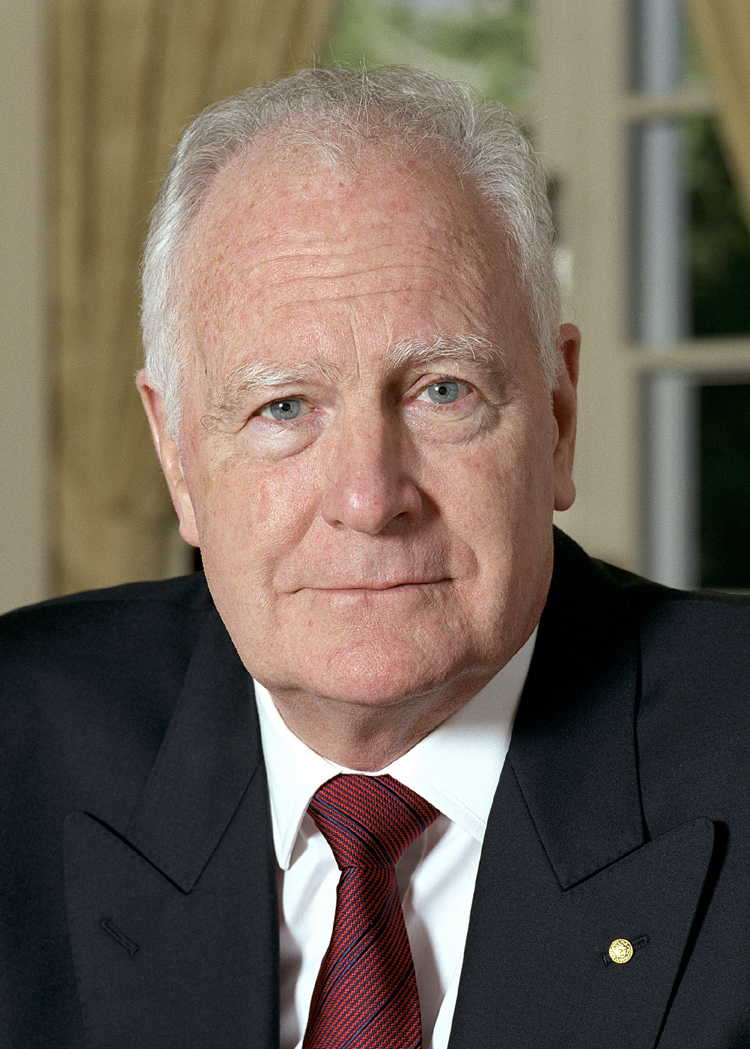
Peter Hollingworth

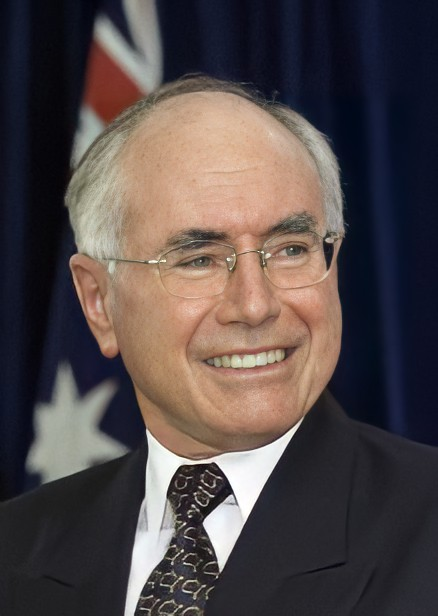
John Howard

- Monarch – Elizabeth II
- Governor-General – Peter Hollingworth
- Prime Minister – John Howard
  - Deputy Prime Minister – John Anderson
  - Opposition Leader – Simon Crean
- Chief Justice – Murray Gleeson

=== State and territory leaders ===
- Premier of New South Wales – Bob Carr
  - Opposition Leader – Kerry Chikarovski (until 28 March), then John Brogden
- Premier of Queensland – Peter Beattie
  - Opposition Leader – Mike Horan
- Premier of South Australia – Rob Kerin (until 5 March), then Mike Rann
  - Opposition Leader – Mike Rann (until 5 March), then Rob Kerin
- Premier of Tasmania – Jim Bacon
  - Opposition Leader – Bob Cheek (until 20 July), then Rene Hidding
- Premier of Victoria – Steve Bracks
  - Opposition Leader – Denis Napthine (until 20 August), then Robert Doyle
- Premier of Western Australia – Geoff Gallop
  - Opposition Leader – Colin Barnett
- Chief Minister of the Australian Capital Territory – Jon Stanhope
  - Opposition Leader – Gary Humphries (until 25 November), then Brendan Smyth
- Chief Minister of the Northern Territory – Clare Martin
  - Opposition Leader – Denis Burke
- Chief Minister of Norfolk Island – Geoffrey Gardner

=== Governors and administrators ===
- Governor of New South Wales – Marie Bashir
- Governor of Queensland – Peter Arnison
- Governor of South Australia – Marjorie Jackson-Nelson
- Governor of Tasmania – Sir Guy Green
- Governor of Victoria – John Landy
- Governor of Western Australia – John Sanderson
- Administrator of the Australian Indian Ocean Territories – Bill Taylor
- Administrator of Norfolk Island – Tony Messner
- Administrator of the Northern Territory – John Anictomatis

== Events ==
=== January ===
- 19 January – 70 asylum seekers at Woomera Detention Centre sew their lips together and hundreds take part in a hunger strike.
- 20 January – The first of the Ashfield gang rapes takes place.
- 26 January – The Melbourne inner-city Birrarung Marr park was formally opened to the public.
- 30 January – Asylum seekers at Woomera Detention Centre end their hunger strike.
- 31 January – Prime Minister John Howard tours Ground Zero in New York City.

=== February ===
- 6 February – Golden Jubilee of Elizabeth II's accession as Queen of Australia
- 9 February – The last remaining Liberal/National coalition state government is voted out in South Australia and replaced by a Labor one, led by Mike Rann. It would be the last such Coalition state government until September 2008.
- February onwards – The worst drought in 100 years affects most of Australia, with water restrictions being put in place in Sydney, Melbourne and many other areas, and farmers being devastated by crop failures.
- 19 February – An independent inquiry is ordered into claims that Governor-General Peter Hollingworth ignored sexual abuse claims.
- 27 February – Governor-General Peter Hollingworth greets Queen Elizabeth II upon her arrival in South Australia for the Golden Jubilee tour.

=== March ===
- 1 – 5 March – The Commonwealth Heads of Government Meeting 2002 takes place in Coolum, Queensland.
- 4 March – Bankrupt airline Ansett Australia formally ceases all operations, with its final flights that had been operating on a scaled-down version of the once major carrier, flying for the last time. The airline's remaining 3,000 staff members are made redundant and the company falls into the history pages permanently after 66 years of operation.
- 8 March – Prime Minister John Howard is criticised for entertaining Aboriginal and Torres Strait Islander Commission Chairman Geoff Clark, who is being investigated on rape allegations.
- 9 March – Amnesty International's Secretary, Irene Khan, criticised Immigration Minister Philip Ruddock for not allowing access to the Woomera Detention Centre after two detainees are injured in protests.
- 12 March – Liberal Senator Bill Heffernan alleges that High Court judge Michael Kirby trawled the streets of Sydney looking for underage rent boys.
- 15 March – Prime Minister John Howard goes to London to meet the Presidents of South Africa and Nigeria, as the Commonwealth decides whether to suspend Zimbabwe.
- 31 March – Janelle Patton becomes Norfolk Island's first murder victim in 150 years.

=== April ===
- 5 April – At the Council of Australian Governments Meeting in Canberra, Prime Minister John Howard concedes ground to the States on human embryo research.
- 19 April – New South Wales Premier Bob Carr officially opens the Ridgeway Gold Mine near Orange.

=== May ===
- 1 May – Prime Minister John Howard and Japanese Prime Minister Koizumi agree to strengthen trade and security links between Australia and Japan.
- 22 May – Christina Cock (b. 1887), Australia's oldest person ever, dies aged 114 years, 148 days.
- 23 May – Queensland police investigate the circumstances surrounding the death of 70-year-old Gold Coast widow Nancy Crick, who took her own life on 21 May in the company of 20 friends and family, after a long battle with immense pain brought on by an inoperable bowel condition.
- 27 May – Victorian Premier Steve Bracks defends his government against criticism by the Catholic Church over stem cell research.
- 30 May – The Victorian Government announces a package of reforms to address the public liability insurance crisis.

=== June ===
- 10 June – Prime Minister John Howard is briefed in Washington, D.C. by the head of the CIA.

=== July ===
- 3 July – Prime Minister John Howard is questioned about mandatory detention during a visit to Germany to discuss economic and trade issues.
- 7 July –
  - The British Naval destroyer HMS Nottingham runs aground off Lord Howe Island. It is eventually sent out to Newcastle for basic repairs and on to Portsmouth in the UK for more detailed repairs.
  - Prime Minister John Howard meets with Pope John Paul II in the Vatican City.
- 8 July – Prime Minister John Howard makes a pilgrimage to the Greek-Australian War Memorial in Crete.
- 17 July – Prime Minister John Howard confirms that paid maternity leave is under active consideration by the Federal Government.
- 20 July – The ALP government of Jim Bacon is re-elected for a second term in Tasmania.

=== August ===
- 2 August – Prime Minister John Howard announces that Australia will be asked to help in an imminent American attack in Iraq.
- 6 August – Clothing manufacturer Pacific Brands grants female staff 12 weeks' maternity leave on full pay in a landmark workplace deal.
- 12 August – Wheat farmers blame the Federal Government for causing the cancellation of $820 million in wheat contracts with Iraq.
- 16 August – The Federal Government appoints a cotton farmer, Dick Estens, to investigate the sale of Telstra. Federal Treasurer Peter Costello tours outback Queensland where he advocates for the full sale of Telstra.
- 19 August – Tasmanian Premier Jim Bacon urges the Victorian Government not to abandon the Baselink development which will link Tasmania to the mainland electricity grid.

=== September ===
- 20 September – A matter involving allegations of a serious criminal offence against Queensland Chief Magistrate Di Fingleton is referred to the Crime and Misconduct Commission for investigation.
- 22 September – Former Liberal Leader Andrew Peacock marries former Texan beauty queen Penne Percy Korth in the United States.
- 24 September – Prime Minister John Howard is out-voted during a meeting with African leaders about the future of Zimbabwe in the Commonwealth.

=== October ===
- 12 October – 88 Australian tourists along with 114 people from other countries are killed in a terrorist attack in Bali, Indonesia.
- 19 October – The Australian Greens win their first seat in the House of Representatives when their candidate Michael Organ wins the Cunningham by-election on preferences.
- 21 October – Two people are killed & three others are injured in a shooting at Monash University. It was the first such mass shooting in Australia since the Port Arthur Massacre in 1996.
- 26 October – Prime Minister John Howard meets with the Russian Prime Minister at the APEC Meeting in Mexico.
- 27 October –
  - Indonesian terrorist group Jemaah Islamiyah (JI) is banned by the Attorney-General, in response to the Bali bombings of 12 October.
  - Indonesian President Megawati pleads with Prime Minister John Howard to lift the travel advice warning to Australians to stay out of Indonesia.

=== November ===
- 5 November – Damien Oliver wins the Melbourne Cup on board Media Puzzle, a few days after his brother died in a riding accident
- 14 November – Bali bomber Amrozi smiles and laughs about the 2002 Bali bombings in an Indonesian court, creating outrage in Australia.
- 30 November – In Victoria, the Labor government of Steve Bracks is re-elected for a second term.

=== December ===
- 11 December – Sex Discrimination Commissioner Pru Goward recommends a 14-week fully paid maternity leave scheme for Australian working women.
- 12 December – The High Court of Australia hands down its decision in the case of Yorta Yorta Aboriginal Community v. State of Victoria, dismissing the native title claim made by the Yorta Yorta peoples to land and waters covering 2,000 square kilometres along and around the Murray and Goulburn Rivers. The Yorta Yorta peoples sought recognition that they are the Indigenous peoples belonging, by tradition, to that country.

== Arts and literature ==
- ARIA Music Awards of 2002
- Tim Winton's novel Dirt Music wins the Miles Franklin Award

== Film ==
- Crackerjack
- The Crocodile Hunter: Collision Course
- Rabbit-Proof Fence

== Television ==
- July – Kath & Kim premieres on the ABC and is a surprise hit.
- September – SBS launches its first Digital channel, the SBS World News Channel.

== Sport ==
- 15 February – Steven Bradbury wins Australia's first Winter Olympic Games gold medal in the 1.000m men's short track speed skating. He only qualified for the finals after all the other competitors in his semi-final crashed, and in the final, he again saw all the other contenders crash in front of him.
- 17 February – Alisa Camplin wins gold in the women's aerial skiing contest. The favourite, Jacqui Cooper, also from Australia, severely injured herself whilst training & was out of action for some time.
- 11 April – First day of the Australian Track & Field Championships for the 2001–2002 season, which are held at the Queensland Sport and Athletics Centre in Brisbane, Queensland. The 5,000 metres were conducted at Melbourne on Thursday 7 March 2002.
- 12 May – Olympic Sharks become NSL Champions for the second time, defeating Perth Glory 1–0 at Subiaco Oval in front of a crowd of the 42,735.
- August – The Bulldogs are deducted 37 competition points after breaking the salary cap scandal, which saw them fined half a million dollars and relegated from minor premiers to wooden spooners for the 2002 NRL season. The New Zealand Warriors are subsequently named minor premiers.
- 13 September – The Melbourne Phoenix defeat the Adelaide Thunderbirds 49–44 in the Commonwealth Bank Trophy netball grand final.
- 15 September – Jeremy Horne wins the men's national marathon title, clocking 2:25:27 in Sydney, while Heather Turland claims the women's title in 2:51:06.
- 28 September – The Brisbane Lions (10.15.75) defeat the Collingwood Magpies (9.12.66) to win the 106th VFL/AFL premiership. It is the second consecutive premiership for Brisbane.
- 6 October – The Sydney Roosters defeat minor premiers the New Zealand Warriors 30–8 to win the 95th NSWRL/ARL/NRL premiership. It marks the end of a 27-year premiership drought for the Roosters.
- 13 October – Mark Skaife and Jim Richards win the Bob Jane T-marts Bathurst 1000 defending the Holden Racing Team's 2001 win. It was Richards' seventh victory, more than anyone other than Peter Brock.
- 5 November – Media Puzzle wins the Melbourne Cup. This comes just days after jockey Damien Oliver's brother is killed after falling off his horse in a race.

== Births ==
- 4 January – Nicholas McAnulty, child actor
- 9 April – Jet Rowland, car accident victim (d. 2004)
- 10 July - Reece Walsh, rugby league player
- 2 September - Tolutau Koula, rugby league player
- 30 September – Levi Miller, actor
- 10 October – Josh Giddey, basketball player

== Deaths ==
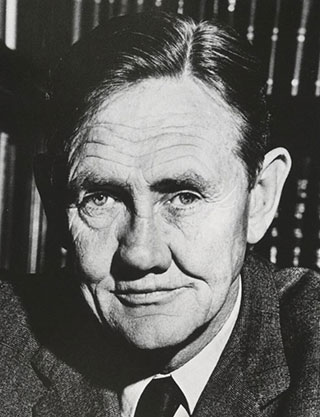
Sir John Gorton

- 21 February – Sir Roden Cutler, 32nd Governor of New South Wales (b. 1916)
- 20 March – Samuel Warren Carey, geologist (b. 1911)
- 13 May – Ruth Cracknell, actress (b. 1925)
- 16 May – Alec Campbell, last surviving Australian veteran of the Gallipoli campaign (b. 1899)
- 19 May – Sir John Gorton, 19th Prime Minister of Australia (born in New Zealand) (b. 1911)
- 25 May – Jack Pollard, sports journalist and writer (b. 1926)
- 7 July – Herbie Screaigh, Australian rules footballer (b. 1911)
- 1 August – Bill Bruce, Olympic long jumper (b. 1923)
- 25 August – Dorothy Hewett, poet, playwright and novelist (b. 1923)
- 2 September – Dick Reynolds, Australian rules footballer (Essendon) (b. 1915)
- 6 November – Roy Leaper, Australian rules footballer (St Kilda) (b. 1906)
- 7 November – Tom Reynolds, Australian rules footballer (Essendon, St Kilda) (b. 1917)
- 14 November – Sir Walter Crocker, diplomat, writer and war veteran (b. 1906).
- 20 December – Bernard King, actor, chef, and television personality (b. 1934)

== See also ==
- 2002 in Australian television
- List of Australian films of 2002
