= Brisbane Powerhouse =

Arts and cultural hub in New Farm, Queensland

Coordinates: 27.469069°S 153.054362°E

- The powerhouse is located in a converted power station
- Interactive map of the Brisbane Powerhouse area
- Former names: New Farm Powerhouse

General information
- Location: 119 Lamington Street, New Farm, Brisbane, Australia
- Construction started: 1926
- Completed: 1940
- Renovated: 2000

Design and construction
- Architect: Roy Rusden Ogg

Renovating team
- Other designers: Peter Roy

The Brisbane Powerhouse is a performing arts and cultural centre which is housed in a former power station in the Brisbane suburb of New Farm in Queensland, Australia. The venue offers an array of live performances, visual art displays, exhibitions, festivals, and free community events.

The first stage of the New Farm Powerhouse was built in 1927–28 as part of the growing need for electricity to supply the Brisbane Trams. The powerhouse began operations in 1928, and was decommissioned in 1971. It was subsequently renovated and re-opened as a modern entertainment hub in 2000.

== Origins ==
Positioned on the northern bank of the Brisbane River, Brisbane Powerhouse was developed from a decommissioned power station.

The original New Farm powerhouse, designed by architect Roy Rusden Ogg and commissioned by the newly formed Greater Brisbane City Council, went into service as the first council-operated power station built in Brisbane in June 1928. Earlier power stations in Brisbane had been operated by private companies. The New Farm powerhouse supplied electricity for the whole tramway network. A total of 56 MW could be produced at 11 kV 3 phase. It also produced power and lighting loads for the suburbs of Yeerongpilly, Toowong and Ithaca. As Brisbane grew, more suburbs drew their electrical power from the powerhouse. The commercial areas and older suburbs of Brisbane drew their electricity from a private power generating company called the City Electric and Light Company, whose powerhouses were located on the Bulimba Reach of the Brisbane River.

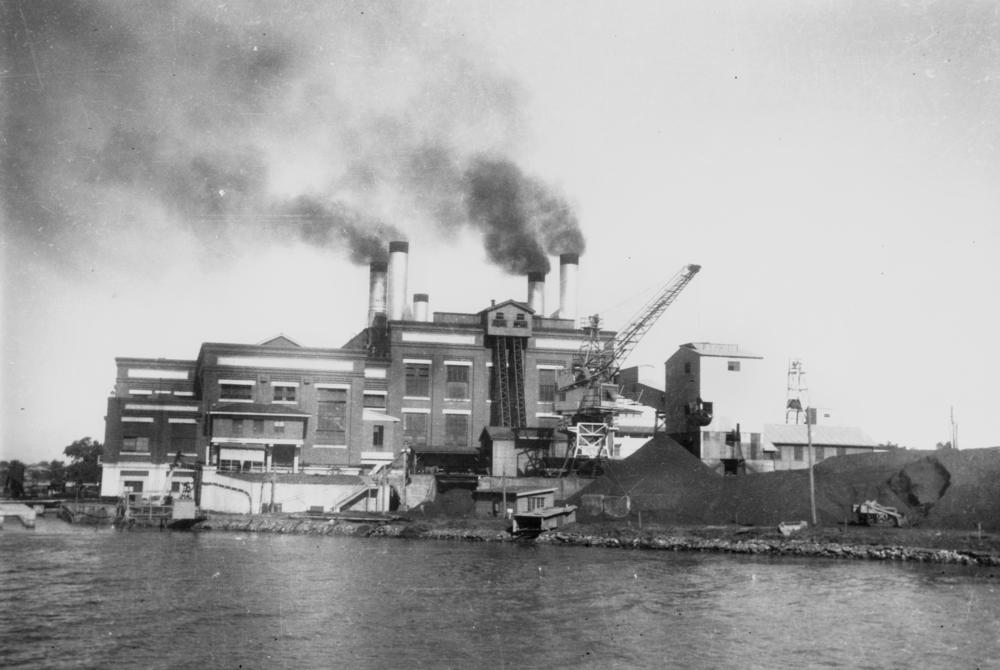
The electric light power house in ca. 1950

The Government of Queensland decided that there should be one electrical authority for South East Queensland in 1961. In 1963, the City Council sold the New Farm powerhouse to the Southern Electrical Authority which was part of the Queensland Government.

Following a change in Council transport policy in 1967 the tram system was converted to bus operation and the last tram in Brisbane finally operated on 13 April 1969. The powerhouse was decommissioned in 1971 becoming derelict due to declining workloads and increasing maintenance costs. Swanbank Power Station became the region's main supplier of electricity. For approximately 20 years the building was used as a works depot, a chemical store by the Queensland Government and by the Australian Defence Force for military exercises.

The building was also used by homeless people for shelter and by street kids for parties and gatherings, with some leaving reminders of themselves; dates, words, their names and art on the walls of the building. These elements contribute to its being such a unique place that photographers and film makers similarly made use of the deserted space filming both commercial and artistic works over the period. In 1989, the ownership of the site was returned to the Brisbane City Council.

== Architecture ==
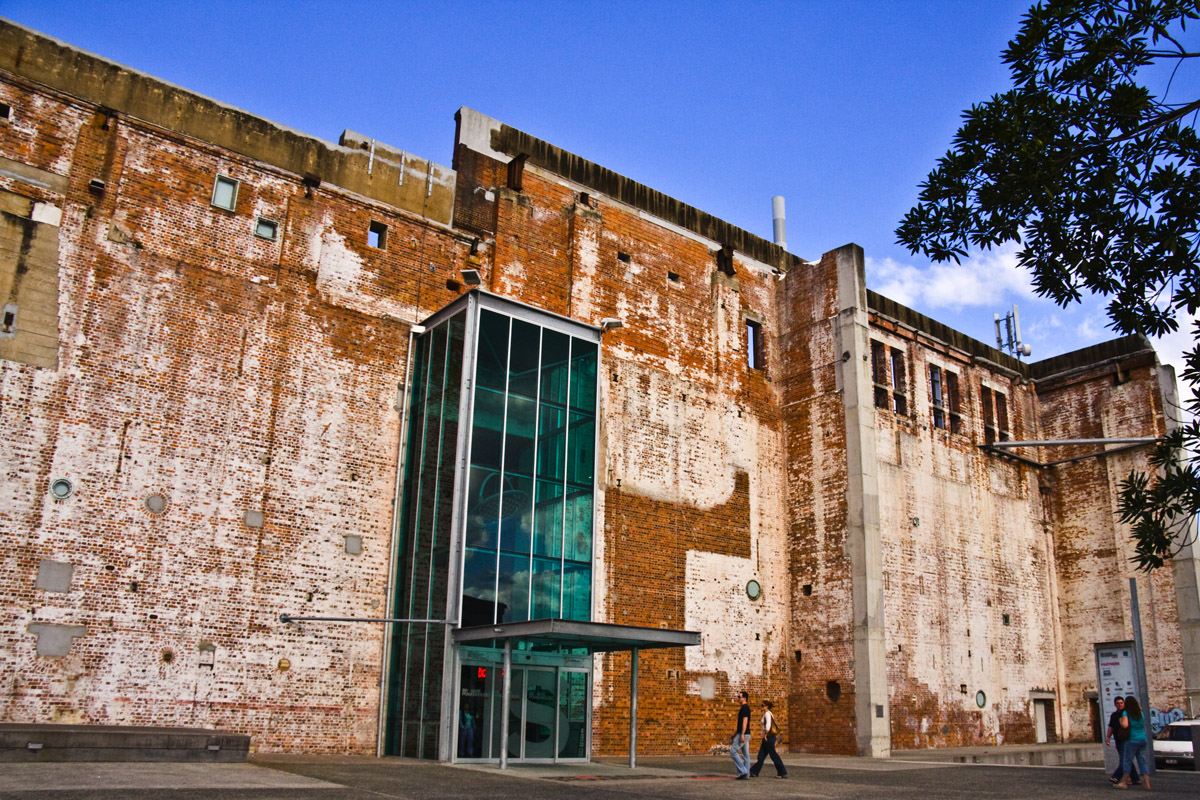
Building entrance

The building comprises three sections, the boiler house, switch house and the turbine room. Apart from the partial demolition of the Boiler Room in 1984 almost the whole building remained intact. The building was constructed in stages, externally from load bearing masonry. Through a programme of land exchange in 1989 the Brisbane City Council was able to re-acquire the building. The adaptation potential to reuse the existing structures without detracting from the cultural significance was recognised and architect Peter Roy was commissioned to create an arts venue from the site. Roy and his team made adjustments such as removed parts of walls, replaced the Turbine Hall roof that had deteriorated and created more defined interior spaces generating another evident phase in the Powerhouse's history. Original elements such as materials from the eastern wall that was heavily damaged were used in other parts of the building. A gantry crane and switch from its power station days and graffiti remain intact.

The refurbished building was opened in May 2000 with additions that appropriate the 1920s building with today's culture.

== Refurbishment ==
2006 was a year of significant change for Brisbane Powerhouse with another major overhaul. With the support of Brisbane City Council and the council's investment of A$3.5 million, Brisbane Powerhouse commenced refurbishment that further enhanced the Brisbane Powerhouse experience. The refurbishment included an upgrade of the hospitality facilities, improved performance spaces and additional covered outdoor-entertaining areas.

== The Powerhouse today ==
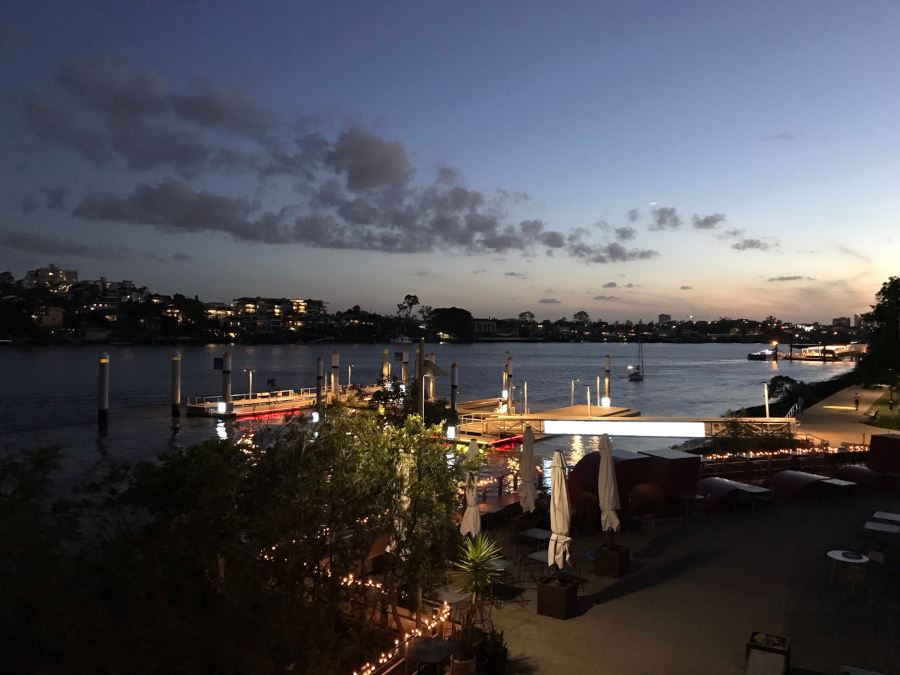
Entertainment at Sunset, Powerhouse, 2021

The Powerhouse is now a multi purpose centre for the arts, housing the 536-seat Powerhouse Theatre, the 200-seat Visy theatre, Turbine Hall, outdoor plaza, green spaces, rooftop terrace, bar, restaurant and plays host to weekend farmers' markets. The Powerhouse Theatre can be configured in different modes which provides more seating or more performance space as required. The venue continues to commission and develop projects in all areas of the visual and performing arts as well as provide workshops for children and the community including the ability to hold multiple functions such as weddings, corporate meets and special events (i.e.: Birthdays, engagements).

== World Theatre Festival ==
The Powerhouse hosted the World Theatre Festival (WTF) annually from 2010 until 2016. (Note: There is no mention of the festival in the annual reports beyond 2016.) The 2016 event included 12 events over nine days in February.

It was described in a local event guide as "a festival of contemporary performance which runs alongside the Australian Performing Arts Market (APAM) in 2016 and 2018". Over the years, the festival included performances by Belarus Free Theatre, Gob Squad (UK/Germany), Colman Domingo Productions (USA), and Marrugeku, Company 2, The Suitcase Royale and Snuff Puppets from Australia, as well as others from countries including Ireland, New Zealand, Malaysia, Italy, India and Belgium.

== See also ==
- History of Brisbane
