= Cindy Pan =

Australian doctor

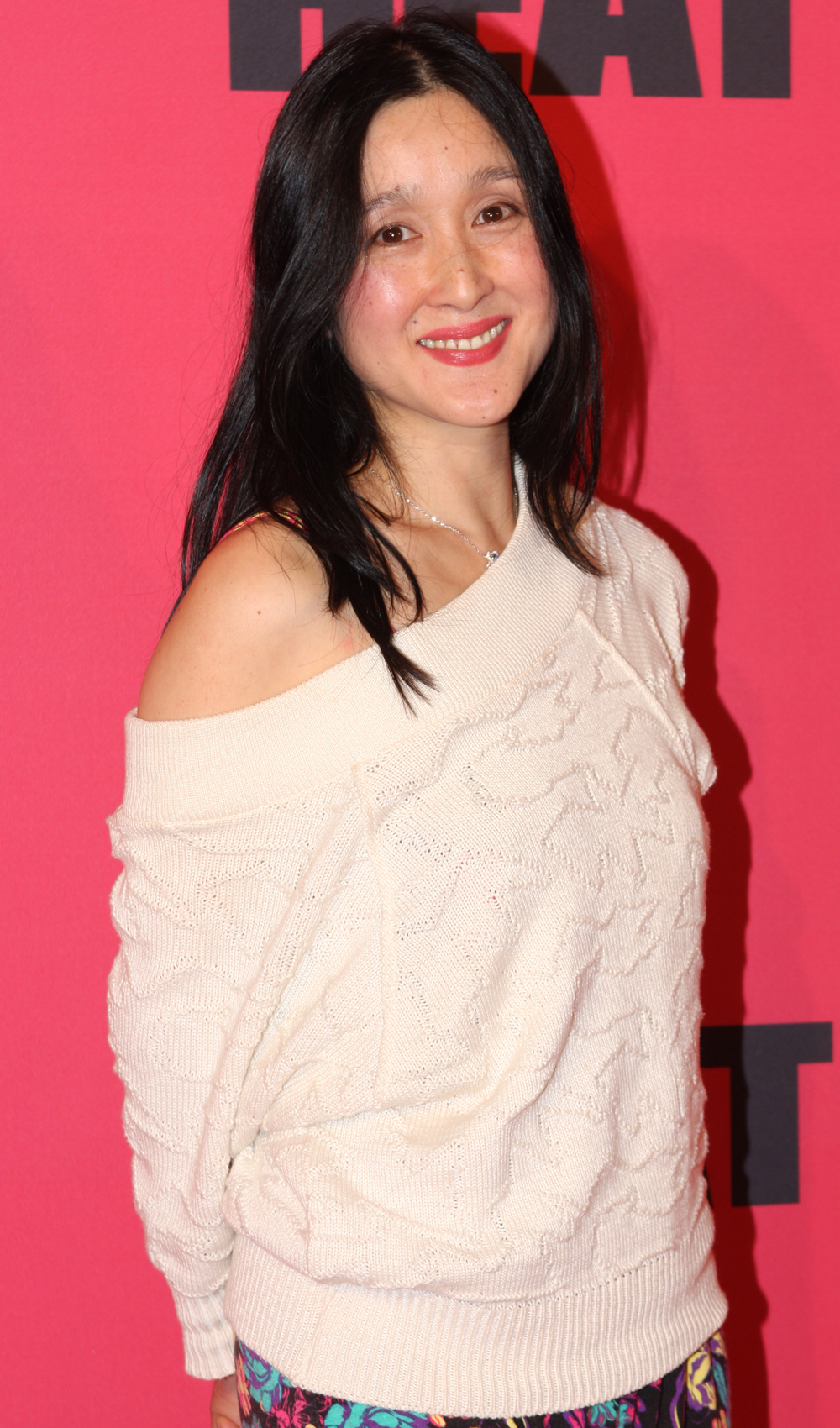
Cindy Pan in July 2013

Cindy Han-Liang Pan is an Australian general practitioner, television personality and author who specialises in sexual health and women's health.

== Early life and education ==
Pan was born in Sydney and was raised on a research station in Badgerys Creek where her father was a scientist. She attended Abbotsleigh School for Girls, before receiving her medical degree at the University of Sydney.

== Career ==
Pan is a general practitioner and Fellow of the Royal Australian College of General Practitioners (RACGP).

Pan has appeared in advertisements, on the Network Ten television series The Panel, and was a regular on the ABC series The Glass House. Pan is also known for her compendium on sex, drugs and relationships, Pandora's Box: Lifting the Lid on Life's Little Nasties". Cindy has appeared on various television programs including: The Pam Ann Show, Big Brother Uncut, Beauty and the Beast, The Super Debates, and the travel documentary The Ties That Bind, in which she and her mother travelled to China in search of their roots.

Pan is a spokesperson for women's health, appearing as the face of PhysiCAL Milk Australian ad-campaign. She was also a guest on Test Australia: National IQ Test 2002, and the 10 October 2008 episode of Hole in the Wall (Channel 9). She writes on relationships, health and sex in Good Medicine and Girlfriend magazines and was previously 'Sex and Relationships' columnist for the Sydney newspaper, The Sun-Herald.

Pan was the Ambassador for Chinese New Year for the City of Sydney in 2000, 2001, 2002 and again in 2007.

== Personal life ==
Pan is a mother to two boys. Currently Pan resides in Sydney.
