= 2004 Redfern riots =

Riots in Sydney after the death of a child

Redfern Riots
- Location: Redfern, Sydney, Australia
- Caused by: Death of Thomas Hickey
- Methods: Molotov cocktails, fireworks, bottles, and rocks. Police brutality

Parties
some local first nations people and activists	New South Wales Police
	Australian Federal Police

Casualties
- Injuries: 20+ first nations people and activists and 42 Police injured

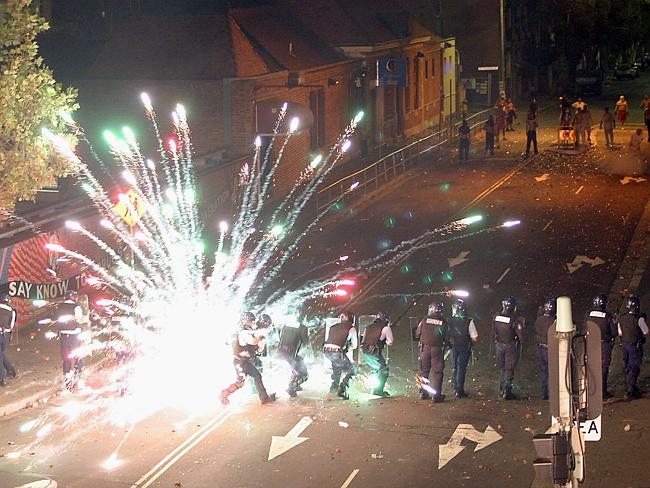
Fireworks being shot at police on Lawson Street during the riot

The 2004 Redfern riots took place on the evening of Sunday 15 February 2004, in the inner Sydney suburb of Redfern, New South Wales, and were sparked by the death of 17-year-old Thomas Hickey, also known as TJ Hickey, resulting from a bike accident in the neighbouring suburb of Waterloo on 14 February 2004.

== Thomas Hickey's death ==
The circumstances surrounding Thomas "T.J." Hickey's death are disputed. On the morning of Saturday 14 February 2004, the 17-year-old Aboriginal Australian boy was riding his bicycle downhill while a police vehicle was patrolling the nearby area. According to New South Wales Police, he collided with a protruding gutter and was flung into the air and impaled on a 1.2-metre (3 ft 11 in) high fence outside a block of units off Phillip Street, Waterloo, causing penetrating injuries of the neck and chest. Police officers at the scene administered first aid until New South Wales Ambulance officers arrived. Hickey died with his family by his side early on 15 February 2004.

At the conclusion of the coronial inquest, NSW Police Commissioner Ken Moroney was interviewed on ABC Radio and gave this explanation of the distinction: "I think if you were to ask the person on the street the definition between, and not a Concise Oxford Dictionary definition, but if you were to ask somebody their interpretation of being followed and being pursued I think they are two distinct and clear actions. Being followed, I think, in the ordinary layman's mind, creates a particular picture. Being pursued by police creates a completely different picture and clearly there was no evidence that Mr Hickey was being pursued in the normal definition of that word".

Moroney supported the driver of the police truck, Senior Constable Michael Hollingsworth, in his refusal to give evidence. Both maintained this was a "normal civilian right".

According to police, they arrived at the scene quickly with Constables Hollingsworth and Reynolds arriving a few minutes after the first police vehicle. Thomas was hanging by his shirt and was not seen to be impaled, but in a serious condition. Police immediately rendered first aid and were unable to save him as "the injury was probably non-survivable". At no time was Police Rescue or NSW Ambulance called off from attending. When ambulance officers arrived, Hollingsworth and Reynolds Helped move Thomas into the Ambulance. A female cousin of Hickey made herself known to Hollingsworth and accompanied both Hollingsworth and Reynolds in the police truck when they left the scene, escorting the ambulance to the Children's Hospital at Randwick . Upon arrival at the hospital, Hollingsworth and Reynolds waited at the accident and emergency department. Some time later Hollingsworth and Reynolds, still at the hospital waiting for TJ's family, were ordered away by a hospital social worker, possibly because Hollingsworth was covered in blood and might have upset the family and members of the public. There was an outstanding arrest warrant in Hickey's name, but police have consistently maintained that the patrol car was searching for a different individual, wanted in connection with a violent bag snatch at Redfern railway station earlier the same day. There was no evidence of a pursuit with Hollingsworth and Reynolds being the second Police vehicle (caged truck) to attend the scene.

The Hickey family and supporters dispute this version of events, claiming that witnesses saw Hickey's bike clipped by the police car, thus propelling him onto the fence. This claim was not supported by the testimony of two Aboriginal Liaison Officers to a NSW Parliamentary Inquiry into the death, though neither of the officers were present at the scene. (One of the officers was later convicted of murder and arson, an act for which he had blamed police.)

Despite calls to re-open the coronial inquest, the New South Wales government has as of 2020 refused to do so.

An appeal to the United Nations Human rights commission by lawyers acting for the Hickey Family to investigate the death and any racial motivation concluded the death to be an accident.

== Riots ==
On the evening of 15 February, Aboriginal and non-Indigenous youths and adults, most of them from The Block, the Waterloo estate and other inner city housing precincts gathered at Eveleigh Street quickly after the word of the death spread. Persons were seen preparing petrol bombs and stockpiling bricks, resulting in police closing the Eveleigh Street entrance to the station, which turned the crowd violent and they began to throw bottles, bricks, live fireworks and Molotov cocktails. The violence escalated into a full-scale riot around the Block, during which Redfern railway station was briefly set alight, suffering superficial damage. The riot continued into the early morning, until police used fire brigade water hoses to disperse the crowd. Total damages included a torched car and 40 injured police officers.

== Post-riot ==
A memorial service was held on 19 February 2004 in Redfern, and in Walgett, New South Wales (Hickey's hometown), on 22 February 2004.

In 2005, the University of Technology Sydney's students' association donated a plaque with TJ's portrait, with an inscription that read: "On the 14th February, 2004, TJ Hickey, aged 17, was impaled upon the metal fence above, arising from a police pursuit. The young man died as a result of his wounds the next day. In our hearts you will stay TJ." Local police, the NSW government and the Department of Housing have refused to allow the plaque to be placed on the wall below the fence where Hickey was impaled unless the words "police pursuit" were changed to "tragic accident", which the family has refused to do.

In 2007, the New South Wales Police were fined $100,000 after the NSW Industrial Relations Commission found it had failed to ensure the health, safety and welfare at work of its employees under the Occupational Health and Safety Act.

== Legacy ==
The 2013 film Around the Block focuses partly on the riots.

== See also ==
- 2005 Cronulla riots
- 2004 Palm Island death in custody (riot)
- 2004 in Australia
- Aboriginal deaths in custody
