= Elizabeth Essex-Cohen =

Australian physicist

- Born: 21 April 1940; Grafton
- Died: 21 March 2004 (aged 63)
- Occupation: Physicist
- Academic career
- Fields: Ionosphere, radio propagation
- Institutions: La Trobe University (1968–2004); University of the West Indies (1966–1968); Air Force Research Laboratory; Air Force Research Laboratory (1978–1979)

Elizabeth Essex-Cohen (née Elizabeth Annette Essex; 21 April 1940 – 21 March 2004) was an Australian physicist who worked in global positioning satellite physics and was among the first women in Australia to be awarded a PhD in physics.

== Early life and education ==
Elizabeth Annette Essex was educated at Grafton High. She subsequently completed a PhD in physics at Australia's University of New England, investigating ionospheric irregularities under Frank Hibberd, graduating in 1966. Essex-Cohen was the fourth woman in Australia to receive a PhD in physics.

== Career and impact ==
After graduating her PhD, Essex-Cohen worked at University of the West Indies and James Cook University before taking up a lectureship position in space physics at La Trobe University in 1968. She remained at La Trobe for the remainder of her career, though in 1974 and 1978/9 she had simultaneous positions at the US Air Force Geophysics Laboratory as part of her GPS research. Her initial work focused on the use of radio wave reflection to study irregularities in the ionosphere.

Her work on radio transmission through the ionosphere led to some of her best-known work in communications between ground and satellites. In the early US Air force's development of GPS (then called Navstar), she was the only Australian involved in the design. Her collaborations with Australian Antarctic Division and the Co-operative Research Centre for Satellite Systems led to her having a significant role in the development of Australia's FedSat satellite (active 2002-2007).

== Death ==
Essex-Cohen became hospitalised for mesothelioma in December 2002. After a brief remission which enabled her to attend a Wireless Science conference, she died on 21 March 2004, aged 63. Tributes included a special session of the (International) Beacon Satellite Group.
