= Test Australia: The National IQ Test =

Test Australia: The National IQ Test is an Australian television show that aired on the Nine Network on 6 August 2002. The program was hosted by Eddie McGuire and Catriona Rowntree and ranked as the most watched Australian television show for 2002. The program, which allowed viewers to obtain a score on an Intelligence quotient (IQ) test while the show aired, was the first of its kind in Australia. It was also the first time an IQ test was available to an entire continent in one night. McGuire returned to host versions of the show in 2003 and 2010.

== Background ==
The show was based on a similar program that had aired in the Netherlands, Germany, France, and the United Kingdom, for which the Nine Network had acquired the rights. Professor Con Stough was one of several experts contacted for the development of the show. Stough was instructed to develop a multiple-choice adult IQ test that would be administered on both the internet and television; he was given three months to complete the task. Stough had reservations about working on the program, and only agreed to do so after the Nine Network agreed to several of his caveats, including airing disclaimers stating that IQ test scores were a limited predictor of success. and that many other factors including motivation and creativity may be more important in everyday life, and that test scores would be affected by various factors including anxiety and cultural background.

== Content and participation ==
The show was a three-hour special. Hosts Eddie McGuire and Catriona Rowntree were joined in the studio by seven groups: blondes, builders, teachers, students, identical twins, Kiwis and celebrities Turkan Aksoy, Layne Beachley, Tim Ferguson, Derryn Hinch, John Jarratt, Gina Jeffreys, Sami Lukis, Cindy Pan, Red Symons and Paul Vautin. In the studio the teachers were the group with the highest average result, followed by celebrities; Red Symons had the highest IQ among the celebrities, with 131. The test consisted of 76 questions which were divided into six categories: language, spatial processes, arithmetic, memory, reasoning, and learning. Over 43,000 people registered to take the test online during the show, and over 20,000 completed the test by texting their results via mobile phone. Results were used for several humorous comparisons, such as whether Aussie rules fans were more intelligent than Rugby league fans (both groups scored equally, with 110).

== Ranking ==
The show was the most watched Australian television show in 2002, with 2.779 million viewers. It was the first time a non-sports program took the top spot since Seinfeld did so 1998. As of 2014, it ranked at No. 35 as the most watched television show of all time in Australia.

== Later years ==
Following the program's success, it was held again the following year, where it attracted 1.6 million viewers.

After a seven-year absence, the third airing of the program occurred on 9 November 2010, attracting 1 million viewers. The website that corresponded to the test experienced some technical difficulties, due to the amount of traffic it received during the show. Controversy erupted over the definition of the word obsequious. Both the Nine Network switchboard and Twitter were inundated with calls and comments respectively, when many viewers disagreed that the definition was "nasty", as they had chosen the response "submissive". IQ scores "went up around the country" when Eddie McGuire announced towards the end of the show that they would accept both definitions as correct. Professor Con Stough, who also devised the 2010 test, stood by the original definition.
