= Marcel Caux =

Australian veteran; last known survivor of the Battle of Pozières

- Born: Harold Katte; 1 March 1899
- Died: 22 August 2004 (aged 105); Chatswood, Sydney
- Military career
- Allegiance: Australia
- Service years: 1915–1918
- Conflicts: First World War; Battle of the Somme; Battle of Pozières
- Awards: British War Medal; Victory Medal; 80th Anniversary Armistice Remembrance Medal; Centenary Medal; Chevalier (Knight) of the Légion d'honneur

Marcel Caux (1 March 1899 – 22 August 2004), born Harold Katte, was an Australian First World War veteran and the last known survivor of the Battle of Pozières.

== Military service ==
Lying about his age, he enlisted on 6 September 1915, aged 16, and on 20 January 1916 embarked for France aboard HMAT Runic with the 9th Reinforcements of the 17th Battalion, Australian 2nd Division. He was transferred to the 20th Battalion with which he fought in the Battle of the Somme. He was wounded in the left ankle during the Battle of Pozières in 1916. He was absent without leave on two occasions. He was wounded twice more, eventually being hurt so badly in 1918 that he was unable to bend his left leg for the rest of his life. He returned to Australia on 16 March 1919.

After the war he was refused an invalid pension, because the physician insisted that if he could stand up, he did not need one. Disillusioned with the army over this experience, he tore up all of his army photographs, moved into the Australian bush and became a carpenter. He claimed until 1998 that he had been wounded in the Second World War, refusing to acknowledge his service during the First World War. He married Doris and they had one son named Marcus, but never told them about his past.

== Honours ==
His secret was discovered in 1998, when he was made a Chevalier (Knight) of the Légion d'Honneur by the French government. After this he was able to come to terms with his past and began attending Anzac Day ceremonies.

The centenarian Caux spent his final days in a nursing home in Chatswood, a suburb of Sydney. He remained opposed until he died to Australian involvement in foreign wars, in particular the 2003 invasion of Iraq. He died peacefully in his sleep.

In 2007, it was revealed that Marcel had led a complex and deceptive life. Allegations were made that he deserted his first wife, then married again without a proper divorce.

== Death ==
Following Caux's death there were only four surviving Australian veterans of the First World War.

== Honours and awards ==

- British War Medal
- Victory Medal
- 80th Anniversary Armistice Remembrance Medal (awarded on 21 April 1999)
- Centenary Medal (awarded on 1 January 2002)
- Chevalier (Knight) of the Légion d'honneur (awarded on 4 July 1998)
