= Tim Bennett =

British artist

Tim Bennett (born 1973) is a British artist, working in Germany. He is best known for his sculpture and installation work.

== Early life and education ==
He was born in Rochdale. After completing his A-levels in 1991, Bennett travelled and worked around Europe, settling in Germany to train as a cook. He began studying fine art in 2000 (Ben Willikens and Hermann Pitz) and completed his diploma in 2006. After receiving a scholarship from the Cusanuswerk to do a master's degree in Fine Art at Goldsmiths, University of London, he lived in London from 2006 to 2008. Since 2008 he lives and works in Munich, Germany.

== Career ==
Prior to his studies Bennett supplemented his income through portrait painting. The experience of working as a stonemason from 1998 to 2000 helped develop his interest in sculpture. His early sculptural work was figurative in style but featured many of the materials characteristic of his current practice: metal, stone, plaster and plasterboard. A key work from this period is his diploma piece, Glypte, consisting of a wire-mesh head on a modelling stand, combined with plaster pieces broken off from a nearby wall.

At Goldsmiths, Bennett moved away from figuration and began to widen his range of references. His final year exhibition, Eden and Francis, featured a 5m long wall made of plasterboard, painted to give the illusion of metal. Another version of the wall, Eden II, was shown at the Diözesanmuseum, Freising in 2009 and a painted wall featured in Reduction & Suspense also in 2009. For his 2007 large-scale installation at the BBK in Munich, Raum in Raum, he again used plasterboard to create a 4m high tree, its shape referencing Albrecht Dürer's engraving, Melencolia I.

Informed by Bourdieu's Distinction: A social critique of the judgement of taste, Bennett's later work became more humorous and knowingly self-referential, playing with the distinctions between high art and low art, fine arts and craft, and elitism and populism. For his first solo exhibition at Jo van der Loo, Time is a Waste in 2014, Bennett walled up the small space in order to create a plasterboard room. Combining a traditional language of fine art with non-art gestures, he used the plaster fragments from the punctured exit holes to make the room's central sculpture, placed on a marble plinth. Like the wall, the plinth is a reoccurring motif in Bennett work. Bennett chooses to present his sculptures with two dimensional work, often involving the process of intarsia. In Time is a Waste these consisted of chipboard inlayed with stucco marble, again combining high and low art elements. For his second show at Jo van de Loo, me_is____ter, he exhibited the series Conspiracy Clouds, made by pouring wet plaster through a hole punctured in the plasterboard. The work employs a well-known modernist gesture to address art's traditional narrative of the genius and his masterpiece.

In his 2017 exhibition at GiG Munich, Beletage, Tim Bennett explored the process of gentrification. To continue his work on gentrification he was awarded the 2017 Stipendium für Bildende Kunst der Landeshauptstadt München.

=== Commissions ===
Tim Bennett is involved with the 'Kunst am Bau' programme, Quivid, completing Es war einmal ein Baum in 2013 and Maiwurm in 2017. Kunst am ZiF commissioned Trophies in 2018, a series of anthropomorphic looking sculptures. His most recent commission, Spring Again, has been for the Erlöserkirche in Munich and consists of both performance and sculpture.

=== Selected exhibitions ===
- 2010: Das ist Programme, Steinle Contemporary, Munich
- 2010: Monumental Structures, Kunstverein SUSI, Cologne
- 2011: Trenddesign, GlasMoog, Cologne
- 2011: Sidelines, Kunstraum, Munich
- 2012: All things bright and broken, Galerie Jahn, Munich
- 2013: Konstrakt, Galerie Jahn, Munich
- 2014: Bienvenue, Galerie Jahn, Munich
- 2014: time is a waste, Jo van de Loo, Munich
- 2015: Then is now, Galerie Bezirk Oberbayern
- 2016: me_is____ter, Jo van de Loo, Munich
- 2017: Beletage, GiG Munich, Munich
- 2018: Trophies, ZiF, Bielefeld
- 2018: Spring Again, Erlöserkirche, Munich
