= List of 2002 box office number-one films in Australia =

This is a list of films which placed number-one at the weekend box office in Australia during 2002. Amounts are in Australian dollars.

== Number-one films ==
†	This implies the highest-grossing movie of the year.

#	Weekend end date	Film	Box office	Openings
1	6 January 2002	The Lord of the Rings: The Fellowship of the Ring	$5,872,528	
2	13 January 2002	Ocean's Eleven	$5,409,083	
3	20 January 2002	Ocean's Eleven	$3,199,254	
4	27 January 2002	Ocean's Eleven	$3,199,325	
5	3 February 2002	Behind Enemy Lines	$1,541,587	
6	10 February 2002	Ocean's Eleven	$1,041,450	
7	17 February 2002	Black Hawk Down	$1,501,623	
8	24 February 2002	Ali	$2,430,804	
9	3 March 2002	A Beautiful Mind	$1,860,370	
10	10 March 2002	A Beautiful Mind	$3,009,995	
11	17 March 2002	A Beautiful Mind	$2,107,121	
12	24 March 2002	Ice Age	$2,603,528	
13	31 March 2002	Ice Age	$3,068,292	
14	7 April 2002	Ice Age	$2,514,508	
15	14 April 2002	Panic Room	$2,618,726	
16	21 April 2002	The Scorpion King	$2,408,153	
17	28 April 2002	We Were Soldiers	$2,398,123	
18	5 May 2002	We Were Soldiers	$1,208,916	
19	12 May 2002	High Crimes	$818,652	
20	19 May 2002	Star Wars: Episode II – Attack of the Clones †	$11,967,380	
21	26 May 2002	Star Wars: Episode II – Attack of the Clones †	$6,165,170	
22	2 June 2002	Star Wars: Episode II – Attack of the Clones †	$3,489,877	
23	9 June 2002	Spider-Man	$10,563,980	
24	16 June 2002	Spider-Man	$5,025,270	
25	23 June 2002	Scooby-Doo	$3,609,010	
26	30 June 2002	Scooby-Doo	$2,670,533	
27	7 July 2002	Men in Black II	$5,353,291	
28	14 July 2002	Men in Black II	$2,879,538	
29	21 July 2002	Men in Black II	$2,513,564	
30	28 July 2002	The Sweetest Thing	$1,118,627	
31	4 August 2002	About a Boy	$1,948,319	
32	11 August 2002	About a Boy	$1,552,583	
33	18 August 2002	Signs	$3,781,736	
34	25 August 2002	Mr. Deeds	$2,692,332	
35	1 September 2002	The Sum of All Fears	$2,102,970	
36	8 September 2002	Insomnia	$1,477,251	
37	15 September 2002	XXX	$3,194,906	
38	22 September 2002	Austin Powers in Goldmember	$5,572,348	
39	29 September 2002	Austin Powers in Goldmember	$3,154,657	
40	6 October 2002	Austin Powers in Goldmember	$2,341,139	
41	13 October 2002	Road to Perdition	$1,411,674	
42	20 October 2002	My Big Fat Greek Wedding	$1,382,249	
43	27 October 2002	My Big Fat Greek Wedding	$3,357,259	
44	3 November 2002	My Big Fat Greek Wedding	$2,917,803	
45	10 November 2002	My Big Fat Greek Wedding	$2,266,475	
46	17 November 2002	My Big Fat Greek Wedding	$2,059,333	
47	24 November 2002	My Big Fat Greek Wedding	$1,592,000	
48	1 December 2002	Harry Potter and the Chamber of Secrets	$10,640,941	
49	8 December 2002	Harry Potter and the Chamber of Secrets	$4,923,416	
50	15 December 2002	Die Another Day	$4,775,897	
51	22 December 2002	Die Another Day	$2,637,398	
52	29 December 2002	The Lord of the Rings: The Two Towers	$14,115,394	

== See also ==
- List of Australian films – Australian films by year
