= Peter Sharp (artist) =

Australian artist (born 1964)

Peter Sharp (born 1964) is an Australian artist who works predominantly in drawing.

== Life and education ==
Born in Sydney in 1964, Peter Sharp graduated with a bachelor's degree in Art Education and a Post Graduate Diploma in Painting in 1987 at the City Art Institute (later Sydney College of Advanced Education). He completed a Master of Fine Arts at the University of New South Wales, College of Fine Arts in 1992. After university, Sharp had regular solo exhibitions at Coventry Gallery, Sydney. Since 2004, however, Sharp has had an annual exhibition at the Liverpool Street Gallery in Sydney, including the critically acclaimed Whale, Sounding, and Spider shows and most recently, Handle.

== Awards and residencies ==
In 1996, Sharp was awarded the Jacaranda Drawing Prize and, in the following year, was granted a residency at the Cité Internationale des Arts in Paris, where he collaborated with French printmakers to make a series of lithographs and etchings. He has also held residencies at the Melbourne Aquarium and Loreto Kirribilli Girls School at the Taronga Zoo in Sydney which were bestowed in 2004 and 2009, respectively. Additionally, in 2007, Sharp received the "Anonymous Donor" Kedumba Drawing Award from the Kedumba Gallery in New South Wales.

== Group exhibitions: Australia ==
Sharp’s work has been on display a number of domestic Group Exhibitions and Prizes, including:

- the Jaracanda Drawing Prize, at the Grafton Regional Gallery, New South Wales (1992)
- the Outback Art Prize, Broken Hill Art Gallery, New South Wales (1993)
- the Fremantle Art Prize, Fremantle Arts Centre, Western Australia (1995)
- the Wynne Prize, Art Gallery of New South Wales (1996 and 2003)
- the Sulman Prize, Art Gallery of New South Wales, Sydney (1998)
- Silver, 25th Anniversary, College of Fine Arts, University of New South Wales (1999)
- Two-Thirds Sky, Hazelhurst Regional Gallery, Sydney (2002)
- Place Mark, College of Fine Arts, University of New South Wales (2003)
- Steven Harvey, Peter Sharp, Kate Turner: A Tribute to Western Australia, Holmes à Court Gallery, Perth (2003)
- Melbourne Art Fair, Melbourne (2004 and 2006)
- Art on Paper Awards, Hazelhurst Regional Gallery, Sydney (2005)
- Tubular Cels, Manly Art Gallery and Museum, Sydney (2005)
- Assembled Works from the Holmes a Court Collection, Holmes à Court Gallery, Perth (2006)
- Swell: The Art of Contemporary Beach Culture, Lake Macquarie City Art Gallery, New South Wales (2006)
- Kedumba drawing Award, The Kedumba Gallery, Wenworth Falls, Blue Mountains, New South Wales (2007)
- the Sulman Prize, Art Gallery of New South Wales, Sydney (2008)
- Silk and Sand: Chinese and Australian Prints, Ivan Dougherty Gallery, University of New South Wales, Sydney and the China Central Academy of Fine Arts, Beijing, China (2008)
- the Dobell Prize for Drawing, Art Gallery of New South Wales (2009).

== Group exhibitions: international ==
As well as frequenting the New South Wales and Australian arts scene, Sharp has exhibited in a number of exhibitions abroad, most significantly at the Cité internationale des Arts Residents Exhibition and the Cité internationale des Arts Printmakers Exhibition in 1997 in Paris; the Krunstraum 34 in Stuttgart, Germany in 2001; the Thai-Australian Contemporary Prints, at Chiang Mai University in Thailand in 2005; and Going Bush, ILIRI Alliance Francais, Paris in 2006.

== Collaborations ==
Sharp's work has often included prints and he has undergone numerous projects and collaborations with printmakers such as Bronwyn Reese (1996), Michael Kempson (2001), Salvatore Gerardi (2005) and, most commonly, with Brenda Tye (1998–2009). Sharp was one of five artists featured in the award-winning documentary Two-Thirds Sky – Artists in Desert Country in 2002, directed by Sean O'Brien and produced by Sophie Jackson, which also became the inspiration for a full exhibition at Hazlehurst Gallery in 2002.
