= Broken Allegiance =

- Directed by: Nick Hallam
- Written by: Nick Hallam; Sudheera Kuruppu
- Produced by: Nick Hallam; Sudheera Kuruppu
- Starring: Paul Hooper; Niobe Dean; Hadrian Jonathan
- Cinematography: John Hall
- Edited by: Nick Hallam; Stephen Rees
- Music by: Rich Johnson
- Production company: Vidizen Films
- Distributed by: TheForce.Net
- Release date: 22 April 2002
- Running time: 23 minutes
- Country: Australia
- Language: English
- Budget: A$6,000

Broken Allegiance is a fan film that made its debut on the internet in April 2002, created by Australian fans of the Star Wars franchise. It is a live-action drama set in the Star Wars universe, taking place a few weeks between the events in A New Hope and The Empire Strikes Back. It tells the story of two Sith apprentices, Ruan and Calis, who have escaped the Empire by fleeing Coruscant in a stolen transport. They must fight for their freedom when Darth Vader sends the vicious bounty hunter Korbain Thor to track them down.

== Production ==
The film started pre-production in January 2001, and was shot both in studio and on locations around Melbourne in Victoria, Australia. Broken Allegiance cost approximately A$5,000 to make, mostly spent on raw materials for sets, props, costumes, catering and equipment rental to make the film. The film was made entirely with volunteer cast and crew.

In a departure from most fanfilms, Broken Allegiance features an original symphonic score by composer Rich Johnson, which was performed by the Johnson Film Orchestra.

== Release ==
Broken Allegiance premiered in 2002 at the Royal Melbourne Institute of Technology's Kaleide Theater, where it was attended by approximately 200 people. It was later posted to TheForce.Net and the movie was also screened throughout the 2002 Australian Sci-Fi Film Festival.

== Reception ==
Upon release, the film garnered major media coverage and was screened at numerous local and international film festivals to great response. Fan Films Quarterly magazine listed Broken Allegiance as one of the 10 most pivotal moments in fan film history in its Summer 2006 issue.

The San Francisco Chronicle's Datebook praised the movie as "pretty much the gold standard of “Star Wars” fan films" and stating that the film's visuals, which they found weird, "works surprisingly well and adds to the short film’s artifact mystique." La Muy magazine praised the film in 2019, highlighting its special effects and setting.

=== Awards ===
- Audience Favorite Award in the 2003 I-CON Film Festival (won)
- Finalist in the 2002 Australian Effects and Animation Awards
