= Music Rights Australia =

Performing rights trade organisation

Music Rights Australia (formerly known as Music Industry Piracy Investigations) is an organisation that protects the creative interests of artists within the Australian music community through educational initiatives, government lobbying and the protection of artists’ copyrights.

Music Rights Australia represents over 2,000 songwriters and music publishers through their association the Australasian Mechanical Copyright Owners' Society (AMCOS), and more than 125 record labels – both independent and major, including Sony Music, Universal and Warner Music – through the Australian Recording Industry Association (ARIA).

Music Rights Australia (https://www.musicrights.com.au/) aims to ensure that the works created by its music industry stakeholders are respected and appropriately rewarded and protected. It also seeks to improve the awareness of intellectual property rights among music fans and the wider Australian community.

== See also ==
- British Phonographic Industry
