= Skipper & Skeeto =

Skipper & Skeeto; Magnus og Myggen (Danish)
- Genre: Edutainment
- Developer: Ivanoff Interactive
- Publisher: Ivanoff Interactive
- Creator: Ole Ivanoff
- Platforms: Windows 3.x; Windows
- First release: Tales from Paradise Park; 1996
- Latest release: In South America; 2009

Skipper & Skeeto (Danish: Magnus og Myggen) is a Danish edutainment franchise created by Ole Ivanoff in 1996, including a TV show and video games.

== Plot and gameplay ==
The series centers on the adventures of the titular characters and protagonists Skipper the adventurous mole and Skeeto the book-loving mosquito. Both friends go around Paradise Park to solve problems. The gameplay has the style of a simple point-and-click adventure game, but the menu, icons and actions change throughout the games. The game was released in several languages including:

- Czech: Skipper & Skeeto;
- Danish: Magnus og Myggen;
- Dutch: Skipper & Skeeto;
- English: Skipper & Skeeto;
- Finnish: Manu ja Matti;
- French: Max & Moustique;
- German: Max und Mücke/Max & Mario;
- Italian: Tico e Zanzo;
- Norwegian: Magnus og Myggen;
- Spanish: Topi y Teo;
- Swedish: Magnus och Myggan.

== Characters ==
- Skipper / Magnus is a mole and one of the two main protagonists of the series. He is brave and adventurous but his biggest shortcoming is that he acts before he thinks, which can get him into trouble. Skipper is curious and likes to discover the nature of the objects in his environment. He moved to Paradise Park after he lost his home and family to an earthquake when he was younger. Now he lives in a treehouse Skipper is friendly and will help others while forgetting about himself, but at the same time he is gullible. Skipper cannot read, but he admires those who can. When Skipper falls ill, he whines a lot.
- Skeeto / Myggen is a mosquito and Skipper's best friend. He is the other main protagonist of the series. Skeeto is intelligent and loves reading non-fiction books. He is smug and occasionally sarcastic, but still friendly and kind. Skeeto is cautious and likes to think things through before embarking on new adventures. He is fiercely loyal to Skipper and always warns him whenever he approaches a dangerous situation. Skeeto decided to move to Paradise Park after years of being bullied by the rest of his swarm. Skeeto is of noble blood, and is believed by some to have been a prince kidnapped as a baby.
- Mr Shade / Skumlesen is the main antagonist of the second, third and fourth games. He is a wealthy albeit cruel and unethical businessman. In the second game, he demands the Count and Countess of Paradise Park to pay him a ransom or else he would convert the park into a landfill. In the third game, it is revealed he is a taxidermist who stores endangered animals he has stuffed in the Shade Building, and he kidnaps Skipper and Suzy to try and stuff them, with no success.
- Suzy Molson / Mia is a female mole who is also kidnapped alongside Skipper by Mr Shade for his stuffed animal collection. She appears in the third and fourth games, and in Hold Da Helt Ferie. Her background information is unknown, but she is just as brave as Skipper is and seems to display more common sense than him. Although she is fragile, she is skilled at fu kung, an ancient, secret martial art.
- Conrad Cat / Konrad Kat is a naughty cat who likes to cause trouble in the park and spoil fun for others with Ricky Tricky. However, his plans never work as there is usually a foil. Conrad is egotistical and his biggest aspiration is to become King of Paradise Park. Conrad has an unrequited crush on Molly, and he has at times tried to get her to 'marry' him.
- Ricky Tricky / Ricky Rotte is a rat and Conrad's sidekick. Ricky is very strong and muscular, but he lacks intelligence. Ricky admires Conrad, even though he is selfish and mean. Without direction, Ricky doesn't know what he wants, so he leave Conrad to decide for him, leading to consequences which do not fall to Ricky's advantage. Although Ricky is friends with Conrad, he is respected amongst the other animals in the park, because when Conrad isn't around, he can actually be very nice.
- Molly Mouse / Molly Mus is a mouse. She is an inventor who hopes to go to the Moon to see if it is really made of cheese. Molly is resourceful and believes everything she sees would a purpose in a future invention.
- Lizzie Bee / Lizzie Bi is a hard-working yet naive honeybee. She makes honey for Paradise Park, which is extremely popular with the other animals. Lizzie does not like her work to go unappreciated, and she has a very bad temper.
- Ruben Rabbit / Kalle Kanin is a young rabbit. He likes to play around and have fun, although he is gullible and sensitive. He cries easily, especially when someone or something upsets him. Ruben is immature at times, which can be annoying to the others. For example, in the game Mysteriet om det talende Solur, Ruben digs an underground tunnel system through the park which goes through Skipper and Skeeto's house.
- Owen Owl / Ulrik Ugle is the oldest resident of Paradise Park. He is a wise owl who has a large collection of books. He is nocturnal, and can get grumpy if he does not get enough sleep. The other animals never fail to see him for advice, though.
- Fungy Frog / Fungy Frø is a frog. He enjoys eating and he particularly enjoys cooking with substances which are not foodstuff. Fungy is selfish and expects people to fulfil his desires while not considering others.
- Melvin Duck / Melvin And is a vain, narcissistic Pekin duck. He collects hand mirrors and is often seen looking at himself in one. Melvin partakes in fads, which change frequently, such as yodelling and playing the tuba.
- Vlad Bat / Frode Flagermus is a bat. He lives in a cave and he usually only leaves it at night. Vlad believes he is ugly thus he is very shy, but Skipper and Skeeto have befriended him. Vlad is altruistic and good-hearted, and at night he returns lost belongings to their owners. Vlad speaks in hisses and gargles, which is unintelligible to the audience, but Skeeto (and to a certain extent, Skipper) can understand his language.

== Games ==
The following is a list of all the game titles in the series

| Original title | English title | Release year |
|---|---|---|
| Leg og Lær med Magnus & Myggen | Tales from Paradise Park | 1996 |
| Den Store Skattejagt | The Great Treasure Hunt | 1996 |
| Skumlesens Hævn | The Revenge of Mr. Shade | 1998 |
| Skumlesens Skygge | The Shadow of Mr. Shade | 2000 |
| Mollys Musikmaskine | Molly's Music Machine | 2000 |
| Mysteriet om det Talende Solur | The Mystery of the Talking Sundial | 2001 |
| Midnatsmysteriet | The Midnight Mystery | 2002 |
| De Alfabetiske Lege | The Alphabetic Games | 2001 |
| Talbutikken | The Number Shop | 2001 |
| På Skattesjov | Treasure Quiz | 2003 |
| Quizkampen | Quiz Games | 2003 |
| Quizkampen II | Quiz Games II | 2004 |
| Hold Da Helt Ferie | Take a Break | 2000 |
| Den Store Legedag | Fun in the Park | 2002 |
| i Australien | | 2009 |
| I Afrika | | 2009 |
| i Sydamerika | | 2009 |

== Animation ==
A Danish-German-Spanish-Australia-British-Irish animation series named Magnus & Myggen with 26 episodes was also produced in 2000 and 2001, which has been shown in Germany on Super RTL, Denmark on DR, Spain on TVE, Australia on ABC And ABC Kids, United Kingdom on BBC One, BBC Two and CBBC, and Ireland on RTÉ 2 Skipper & Skito since June 4, 2001.

== Critical response ==
In a review of the 2001 game Skipper and Skeeto: The Great Treasure Hunt by Ivanoff Interactive, Rosemary Young from metzomagic.com said "it is probably best suited to older children although parents might also have some fun helping out. It's quite a substantial game and...it's very intuitive". She gave it 2 and a half stars (out of 5).
