= The Suitcase Royale =

Musical ensemble from Melbourne, Australia

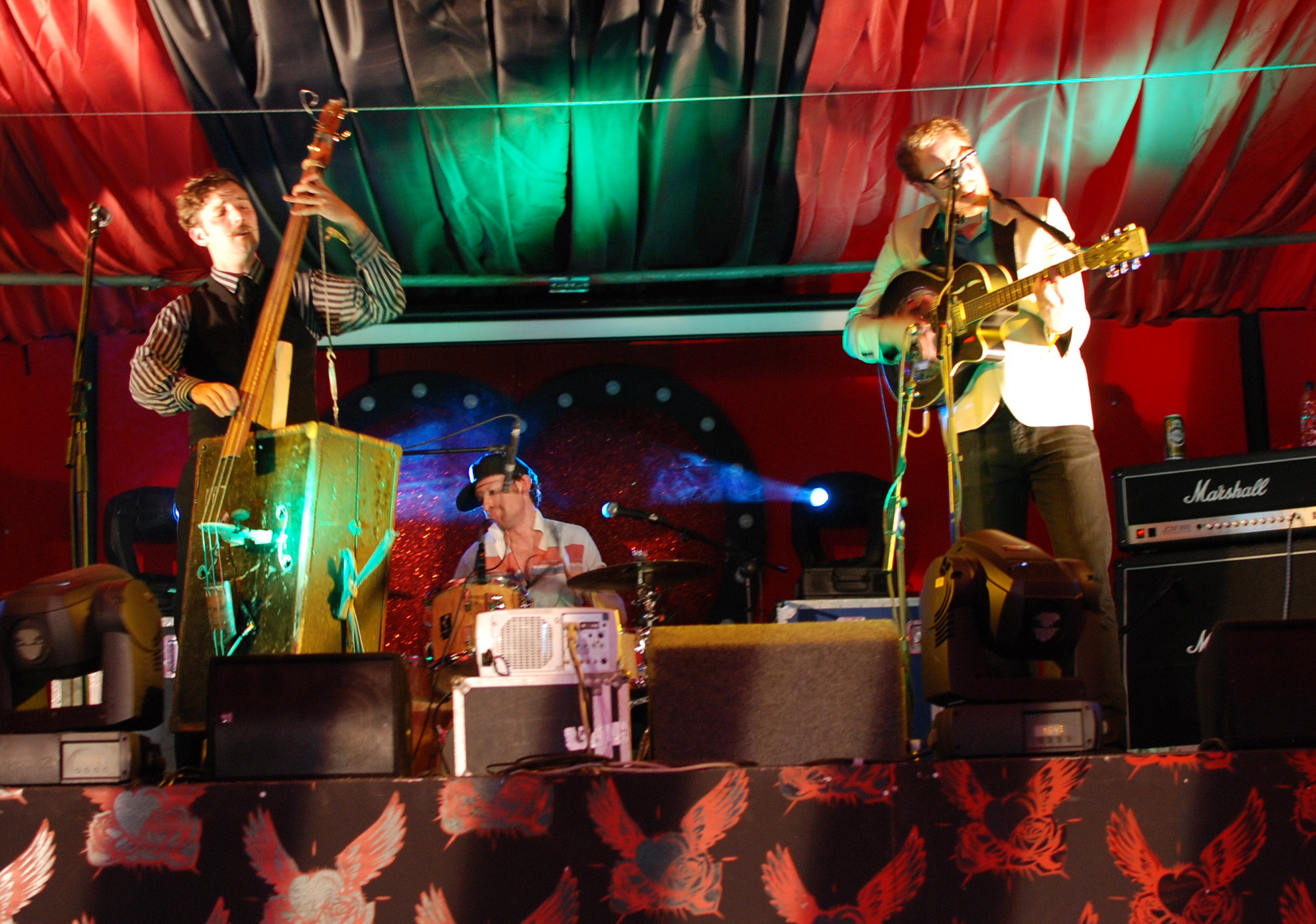

Background information
- Origin: Melbourne, Australia
- Genre: comedy
- Years active: 2004–present
- Website: www.thesuitcaseroyale.com

The Suitcase Royale is a theatre-comedy ensemble from Melbourne, Australia, composed of Joseph O'Farrell, Miles O'Neil, and Glen Walton. The group started in 2004 and has since created several major shows, and toured both in Australia and internationally. They have also won several awards.

== Career history ==
Joseph O'Farrell, Miles O'Neil, and Glen Walton met at Deakin University in 2002 while undertaking a creative arts degree in theatre. O'Neil has said that they started out as a folk music band, and just made a theatre show as a sideline, to fill a double bill for the Melbourne Fringe Festival.

The trio employ a knocked-together aesthetic and play live rag'n'bone music to frame their self-coined "junkyard theatre".

== Shows ==
=== Felix Listens to the World ===
The show was devised by the boys in their final year at Deakin University drama school in 2004. At that stage they thought of themselves as a band but friends preparing a contemporary dance performance asked them to make up the second part of a double bill at the Melbourne Fringe Festival, where the show went on to win the Best Performance Award. The ensemble toured the Canadian Fringe circuit from May to September 2004 and performed Felix at four festivals: Montreal, Ottawa, Winnipeg and Edmonton. The Montreal Gazette described the show as "theatrical genius"; and the boys' favourite quote was "Wallace & Gromit meets David Lynch". Felix returned to Australia and was performed as part of the Melbourne International Arts Festival 2004. Through 2005 it was performed at the Adelaide Fringe Festival, Lanfrachis Memorial Discothèque and Perth Awesome Festival. It was later put to rest at the International Figurentheater-Festival in Erlangen, Germany, May 2009.

=== Chronicles of a Sleepless Moon ===
The show centered around a wardrobe, which fit the whole set, and was reinforced with the DIY approach idiosyncratic of the company. The wardrobe doubled as the underground vessel that took the characters of the Butcher (O'Neil), the Doctor (Walton) and the Newsman (O'Farrell) deep beneath the earth. Chronicles premiered in March 2004 at the Melbourne Next Wave Festival. It went on to be performed at Lanfranchis Memorial Discothèque and the Adelaide Fringe Festival in 2005. It was performed as a part of the Melbourne Comedy Festival in April 2006. It travelled to the Edinburgh Fringe Festival in August 2006. Chronicles was shown at the Andy Warhol Memorial Theatre in Pittsburgh, PA in November 2007. The show is later voted #4 in the top 20 events of Pittsburgh in 2007. It was performed at the Ruhrfestspiele in Recklinghausen, Germany, in June 2008 where a companion comic book was created by a local artist. It was then performed in the Bosco Theatre in Dublin as part of the Dublin Fringe Festival and at the Soho Theatre in London in September 2008.

=== The Ghosts of Ricketts Hill ===
"From out of a marsh, under a tree in the left corner of the left field comes the first ever showings of The Ghosts of Ricketts Hill at the [New Year's Eve] Falls Festival in Marion Bay, Tasmania, 2005." The show premiered at the Black Lung Theatre in March 2006, simultaneous to the run of Chronicles at the Adelaide Fringe. It was performed at the Falls Festival in Lorne, Victoria over New Year's Eve in 2007, the Imperial Panda Festival, Sydney, in January 2008, the Adelaide Fringe Festival in February 2008. It played at the Melbourne Comedy Festival in March 2008 where the company received the Golden Gibbo Award.

=== The Ballad of Backbone Joe ===
Backbone Joe was first performed at Suitcase HQ and sometime venue, 25A in Northcote, Melbourne October 2007. It premiered at Federation Square, Melbourne, as part of the Puppet and Visual Theatre Festival in June 2008. It went on to play at the Darwin Festival in August 2008, Sydney's Imperial Panda Festival in February 2009, the Ruhrfestspiele in Recklinghausen in May 2009 and at the Edinburgh Comedy Festival in August 2010. The show played at the Sydney Theatre Company in September 2010. It did a season at the Soho Theatre in London's West End in July 2011.

=== The SPACE SHOW ===
First played at the Falls Festival, Lorne, Victoria, over New Year's Eve 2008-2009. Its premiere season was at the PACT Theatre in Sydney in March 2009. It played at the Melbourne Comedy Festival in March 2009 and at Battersea Arts Centre, London in May 2009.

=== Zombatland ===
Zombatland was first performed as a scratch show at the Battersea Arts Centre in July 2011. It is playing at the 2011 Edinburgh Festival at the Pleasance Courtyard.

== Other work ==
The Suitcase Royale collaborated with UK theatre company Lone Twin on Newsboys at the Melbourne International Arts Festival in 2008. They have worked extensively with Melbourne singer Simone Page-Jones.

They regularly play music gigs as a full band in support of their eponymous album, released in 2010.

== Awards ==
They are the recipients of the Best Performance Award, Melbourne Fringe Festival (2004); the Golden Gibbo Award, Melbourne Comedy Festival (2008); and the awards for Innovation and Excellence, Green Room Awards (2010). In 2010 they were nominated in the Innovation category of the Total Theatre Awards at the Edinburgh Fringe Festival for The Ballad of Backbone Joe.
