= Jet's Law =

State law in Queensland, Australia

Jet's Law is the first eponymous law to be created in the state of Queensland, Australia. It protects people from motorists who have a medical condition that may affect their ability to drive. The most common conditions reported are Epilepsy and Diabetes.

== Jet Paul Rowland ==
On 28 February 2004, 22-month-old Jet Paul Rowland (born 9 April 2002) was killed when a driver with unstable epilepsy travelling in the opposite direction suffered a seizure, crossed the median strip on the Logan Motorway, south of Brisbane, and collided with the car Jet was travelling in with his mother Anita and his brother Bailey, aged 6. Anita Rowland, a police officer with the Queensland Police Service, sustained life-threatening injuries after the 200 km per hour impact. Bailey's spinal cord was severed, causing instant paraplegia. Jet later died at Brisbane's Mater Children's Hospital on the night of 28 February due to massive internal injuries after life support had to be withdrawn.

The case highlighted and demonstrated the importance of managing any potentially unstable medical condition and the Coroner's Inquest, held on 25–26 August 2005, revealed that the driver who collided with the Rowland's vehicle had been experiencing 'frequent seizures' and therefore should not have been driving. 'The most telling question and answer in the inquest was when the driver was asked; 'You would not want to be driving while you had a simple partial seizure at one hundred kilometres per hour, would you?' The driver responded 'No'.

The State Coroner recommended the following actions be taken:

1. Review of practices concerning the forwarding of discharge summaries from hospitals in Queensland (both public and private) to ensure uniform consistent practice in forwarding a patient's discharge summary to the patient's general practitioner.
2. Review of legislation to require any doctor becoming aware of a patient suffering any epileptic event which would, in that doctor's opinion adversely impact on the patient's ability to safely drive a motor vehicle, to specifically discuss the issue with the patient at the consultation. The legislation should require the doctor to;
  (i) advise the patient if the doctor considers it inappropriate to continue to drive,
  (ii) set a period of time and/or refer the patient to an appropriate specialist for further management and advice concerning suitability to drive.
  (iii) provide written confirmation of the doctor's advice to the patient.
3. Review of legislation to consider whether and in what circumstances a driver, and/or a treating doctor should be required to inform the Transport Department of a medical condition (such as epilepsy) or a change in the medical condition of a person impacting on their ability to safely drive. Consideration of whether sanctions should apply against a driver and/or a treating medical officer if they fail to report relevant information.
4. Review of legislation (after consultation with relevant interest groups) to consider a panel of independent doctors available to accept referrals for assessment of suitability to drive in the context of epilepsy. The panel would be available to review a driver's eligibility to drive and to inform the Department of Transport accordingly.
5. Initiative by the Department of Transport or other appropriate agency or authority to publicise both to the public and the medical profession the Guidelines for Fitness to Drive. Emphasis should be given to a responsibility to review a person's fitness to drive in circumstances where there is any alteration in the person's medical condition likely to impact on their ability to safely drive a motor vehicle.
6. Review of current Australian standards of child safety restraint mechanisms taking into consideration world best practice standards, despite Jet having been restrained properly.

== Anita Rowland ==
Anita Rowland lobbied the Queensland government for more stringent guidelines regarding medical conditions and driving. In 2008, new legislation was passed and 'Jet's Law' was created: whereby if a driver has a medical condition which may affect their ability to drive safely, they must declare it to the Queensland Department of Transport and Main Roads, as well as to their relevant health professional (doctor, physiotherapist, occupational therapist). Should there be a deterioration or a change in a person's medical condition, it must be reported and a medical certificate issued to indicate that the person is fit to drive.

Following Jet's death, Anita returned to the police service and began facilitating road safety workshops with the Queensland Police Service as well as the Australian Defence Forces and Queensland Rail to make drivers aware of their duty of care. Through these workshops, it is estimated that Anita has shared her story with at least 10,000 people. While Anita left the service in 2013, her husband continues to work for the Queensland Police Service.
