= The Mole (Australian TV series) =

- Genre: Reality
- Presented by: Grant Bowler; Tom Williams; Shura Taft
- Country of origin: Australia
- Original language: English
- No. of seasons: 6
- No. of episodes: 64

Production
- Executive producers: David Mason (Seasons 1-5); John Leahy (Season 6)
- Running time: 43 minutes
- Production company: FremantleMedia Australia (2013)

Original release
- Network: Seven Network
- Release: 27 February 2000 – 16 October 2013

Related
- The Mole

The Mole an Australian adventure reality game show based on the Belgian TV series The Mole, which has been adapted in other countries.

Following the premise of other versions of The Mole format, the show features a group of contestants who must collaborate in a series of missions to win money for a Prize Fund, which serves as the game's grand prize. However, among the group of contestants is the titular "Mole" – a secret double agent hired by the producers to sabotage the money-making efforts of the group whose identity is unknown to the audience and the other players. The genuine contestants must find and follow the behaviour of The Mole during the game and the missions. The contestant who knows the least about The Mole, as determined by the results of a Quiz, is "Terminated" - eliminated from the game. In the end, the player who knows the most about The Mole after participating in the Final Quiz is declared the winner and is awarded the Prize Fund.

The series aired on Seven Network. The series was hosted by actor Grant Bowler in its first four seasons. Tom Williams hosted the fifth season, Shura Taft hosted the sixth season. The first three seasons, as well as the sixth, all took place in Australia, but the fourth and fifth were set in New Caledonia and New Zealand respectively. The first season was produced by Mason Media Group. Seasons two to five were produced by Seven and executive-produced by David Mason. The sixth season was produced by FremantleMedia Australia.

== Format ==
=== Contestants ===
Contestants typically meet each other shortly before shooting begins. However, in season six, contestants only met each other as a whole group for the first time upon completion of the first assignment of the season.

=== Assignments ===
Each episode features multiple assignments (called "challenges" in season one, and occasionally in the later seasons), of varying size and value, that are worth money to the group kitty (or "pot" in season six) if successfully completed. Some assignments have penalties associated with them if they are failed. The assignments may require physical skill, mental acuity, keen strategy, or all three from the players for them to be successfully completed. In some cases, assignments were not fully explained to all contestants, where only selected contestants were informed of the full nature of the challenge, and must work towards a different goal than the rest.

Some assignments require every member of the team to successfully complete their part for money to be won, while others will assign a value for each individual player to finish. The players are commonly told to separate into several groups, which determines particular roles for an assignment. Assignments often have explicit rules attached to them, with monetary penalties from the pot assessed if they are violated. Rule violations outside the boundaries of an assignment can also cost the team money from the pot, though this is less common.

=== Quizzes and elimination ===
At the end of each episode, the players take a multiple-choice test based on the identity of the Mole, asking questions such as "Who is the Mole?". The player who scores the lowest on the quiz each time is eliminated (or, in season six, "terminated") from the game. The length of the computer test varied by season; in season one the quiz was twenty questions. In seasons two and three it was ten questions in length, and in season four it was reduced further to six questions. Season five changed the elimination format slightly given the season's live format. During the live broadcast (from Seven's Martin Place Studios) five questions were asked - four about the Mole's role in challenges the players participated in during the week, with the 5th question being "Who is the Mole?. However, a further five questions on biographical information (such as "What city does the Mole live in?") were asked before the broadcast. The Elimination Ceremony would follow immediately from the live questions as part of the live broadcast. Season 6 returned to a quiz of twenty questions similar to season 1.

The final quiz is normally double the number of questions from the earlier quizzes.

Free Passes (sometimes known as "exemptions" or "immunity") which allows them to automatically progress to the next round without taking the quiz. However, in season six, players who won exemptions would have to defend them in later assignments, or risk losing them. If there was a tie for the lowest score, the player in the tie who took the longest time to take the quiz would be eliminated. Sometimes, contestants are offered the chance to give up their free pass in exchange for a particular amount of money to be added to the kitty; however, they must still take the quiz and remain vulnerable. The host can reveal who is exempt from elimination before the process begins, as by then he or she would have completed the quiz by then (like in seasons 3 and 5). In this case, a contestant would have had to have bid money from the kitty to buy the free pass, with the highest bidder being awarded the exemption.

In season 6 players can also earn "Freebies". If a player chooses to use them, then a question that was answered incorrectly on the quiz will be counted as a correct answer.

== Season overview ==
List of The Mole (Australia) seasons
| # | Subtitle | Broadcast details | | | Game details | | | Results | | | Host |
| # | Subtitle | Eps | Premiere | Finale | Location | Players | The Mole | Winner(s) | Runner up | Prize Fund | Host |
|---|---|---|---|---|---|---|---|---|---|---|---|
| 1 | – | 10 (Note: These seasons also featured a reunion special as the 10th episode.) | 27 February 2000 | 24 April 2000 | Tasmania | 10 | Alan Mason | Jan Moody | Abby Coleman | $115,000 / $200,000 | Grant Bowler |
| 2 | – | 10 | 21 February 2001 | 25 April 2001 | Victoria | 16 (Note: Of the 16 players, six would be eliminated in a special qualification challenge to determine the Final 10 players.) | Michael Laffy | Brooke Marshall | Hal Pritchard | $100,000 / $200,000 | Grant Bowler |
| 3 | – | 10 (Note: This does not include a special episode of The Weakest Link which was the basis of a challenge during the season.) | 20 February 2002 | 24 April 2002 | Gold Coast | 12 | Alaina Taylor | Crystal-Rose Cluff | Marc Jongebloed | $108,000 / $300,000 | Grant Bowler |
| 4 | In Paradise | 10 (Note: This does not include a special recap episode.) | 27 July 2003 | 28 September 2003 | New Caledonia | 10 | Petrina Edge | Shaun Faulkner | Nathan Beves | $104,000 / $500,000 | Grant Bowler |
| 5 | The Amazing Game | 10 | 25 August 2005 | 28 October 2005 | New Zealand | 12 | John Whitehall | Liz Cantor | Craig Murell | $203,000 / $500,000 | Tom Williams |
| 6 | (Note: A working subtitle & theme for the season was Culture Clash, which was teased and used at the Network's upfronts, but this was abandoned in production and airing.) | 21 | 2 July 2013 | 16 October 2013 | Australia | 12 | Erin Dooley | Hillal Kara-Ali | Aisha Jefcoate | $180,000 / $250,000 | Shura Taft |

=== Locations map ===
Locations of the Australian version of The Mole (season 6 did not remain in one single location hence no location is given).

== Awards ==
Logie Awards:

- 2001 Most Popular Reality Program (won)
- 2002 Most Popular Reality Program (lost to Big Brother)
- 2003 Most Popular Reality Program (lost to RPA)
- 2004 Most Popular Reality Program (lost to Australian Idol)
- 2006 Most Popular Reality Program (lost to Australian Idol)

== Notable contestants and statistics ==
- Alan Mason, the first season's Mole, was the adjudicator on The Weakest Link throughout that show's entire run.
- Abby Coleman, the runner-up of the first season, is now a presenter on Brisbane's HIT 105. At 18, she was the youngest ever contestant to play the game, and reach the final, albeit losing.
- Jessica Hardy, eliminated in the first episode of the second season, appeared on Big Brother Australia 2002 as a housemate and developed a relationship with Marty on that show, which later dissolved.
- Michael Laffy, the second season's Mole, formerly played for the Richmond Football Club in the AFL. He only played a handful of games in a career marred by injury.
- John Binning, eliminated in the second episode of the third season, at 72 is the oldest player to play the game. Had he made it to episode four, he would have also been the oldest ever contestant to appear on the Australian version of The Weakest Link.
- David Annand, eliminated in the seventh episode of the third season, whose father Bud played several games for the St Kilda Football Club in the 1950s and 1960s. David also had a cameo role on the TV show Canal Road, playing a bank robber.
- Robert "Bob" Young VII, eliminated in the ninth episode of the third season, was the winner of the Weakest Link special aired on 11 March 2002.
- Marc Jongebloed, the runner-up of the third season, soon embarked in a career in acting. As well as this, he also had a job as a marketing executive at the Collingwood Football Club.
- Alaina Taylor was the first female mole in the Australian series and also the youngest mole in the Australian series aged 21.
- Crystal-Rose Cluff was the youngest winner of The Mole, at 21. Jan Moody is the oldest, at 40.
- Petrina Edge, the fourth season's Mole, was one of the minor producers behind the animation film Happy Feet.
- Cam Villani and Alison Lyford-Pike (both contestants from the fourth season) developed a relationship with each other soon after their season ended. Villani had been eliminated in an atypical elimination, was resurrected before being eliminated in the penultimate episode.
- Nathan Beves, the runner-up of the fourth season, embarked on a career in modelling soon after the show ended.
- Heidi Monsour was the only player ever to earn two free passes in one season, in 2005. She is the younger sister of Lisa Newman, the wife of Queensland Premier Campbell Newman. She was eliminated in the seventh episode of that season.
- Kristy Curtis was a part-time trainer on The Biggest Loser Australia in its fourth season while also a coach in The Biggest Loser Asia.
- Liz Cantor, the winner of the fifth season, is now a personality on Brisbane's Seven News, filling in on weather.
- The most money ever lost by a Mole was $427,000, by Petrina Edge in the fourth season, where the potential top prize was $500,000. The least money lost by a Mole was $85,000, by Alan Mason in the first season, where the potential top prize was $200,000.
- The most money ever won by the genuine contestants was $203,000, by Liz Cantor in the fifth season, where the potential top prize was $500,000. The least money won by the genuine contestants was $100,000, by Brooke Marshall in the second season, where the potential top prize was $200,000.
- Overall, the five winners across the five seasons won $630,000 in prize money, at an average of $126,000 per season. The five Moles across the five seasons lost $1,311,000 in prize money, at an average of $262,200 per season.
- The range of money lost by the Mole was $342,000 across the five seasons. The range of money won by the genuine contestants was $103,000 across the five seasons.
