= Liz Cantor =

Australian television personality

- Born: Elisabeth Cantor; 11 October 1982 (age 44)
- Occupation: Television presenter
- Years active: 2005–present

Liz Cantor (born 11 October 1982) is an Australian television presenter. She was the winner of the reality television game show The Mole in 2005.

== Education ==
Cantor attended high school at St Peters Lutheran College at Indooroopilly, west of Brisbane city. While there she was selected as a prefect and sports captain. She graduated from Griffith University in 2003 with a Bachelor of Communications, majoring in journalism and meteorology. While at university she was a member of the string quartet and orchestra and was on the basketball, softball, hockey and debating teams. She has said she had considered studying marine biology but the performance side of her personality pulled her towards a career in the media industry.

== Career ==
=== Surfing ===
Cantor was a professional surfer who competed on the Australian junior circuit for five years. Sponsored by Billabong, her surfing career took her to Fiji, Tahiti, the Maldives, Hawaii and Europe to compete. She was also one of the first female surf judges to travel internationally on the ASP and World Circuit Tour.

=== Television ===
She made her on-screen debut in the 2002 Australian feature film Blurred, which followed five groups of teenagers as they hit the road for Schoolies Week. A year later she appeared in the 2003 film Gettin Square before landing a role on Australian television drama series Blue Water High as Corin Hardy in 2005. That year she won a spot on the Seven Network reality television show The Mole, a show which kickstarted her career with the broadcaster. In The Mole she worked with other contestants to perform challenges, each of which add money to the winner's pot. But one of the members is "The Mole", a saboteur who is covertly trying to make the group fail. She competed against 12 other contestants and won, leaving the show with $200,000 in prize money.

Following the show the Seven Network hired Cantor as a presenter on Queensland's water based outdoor adventure lifestyle program Creek to Coast and on The Great South East, a travel program focusing on tourist attractions in South East Queensland. In 2005, Cantor made her debut as a weather presenter for Seven News and in 2008 she became the presenter for Queensland's live Gold Lotto draw. Cantor is still involved in each of these roles. Liz is now a host on travel and lifestyle show Queensland Weekender and in 2016 will appear in new ultra HD network INSIGHT's first ever adventure reality show shot in 4k Living Stone - Botswana.

In August 2024, it was announced that Cantor would become the new weather presenter on the revived standalone edition of 10 News First Queensland, which launched on 2 September 2024.

=== Radio ===
Cantor has filled in on a number of summer radio shows for Nova Brisbane, Hot Tomato and Sea FM on the Sunshine Coast and Gold Coast. She teamed up with well-known radio personality Michael "Pickle" Walkley to host Sea FM Summer Breakfast on the Gold Coast over the Christmas break in 2013/14.

== Personal life ==
Cantor married Ryan Lysaught on 16 October 2016 at Ayana Resort, Bali. They live on the Gold Coast.
