= The Mole (Australian TV series) season 5 =

The Mole
- Season 5
- No. of episodes: 10

Release
- Original network: Seven Network
- Original release: 25 August – 28 October 2005

Season chronology
- ← Previous; Season 4 Next → Season 6

The fifth season of the Australian version of The Mole, subtitled The Amazing Game, took place in New Zealand and was hosted by Tom Williams.

== Show Details ==
The announced maximum kitty for the season was $500,000, though the absolute maximum was slightly more than that. The final group kitty was $203,000. Unlike previous seasons, the show was produced live, with the challenges occurring over a weekend in New Zealand. Afterwards, the players were flown into Sydney for a live quiz and elimination on Thursdays. The live eliminations occurred at Sevens's Martin Place Studios - which also hosts many of Seven's news programs. This also meant that the seclusion of the players, normally a standard feature of The Mole, was broken, as the players had access to the outside world - including being able to communicate to friends and family while in Sydney, watch the produced episode, and search the internet for clues.

Additionally, it was revealed at the beginning of the series that if the Mole went unidentified throughout the series, they would win all the money that was kept from the kitty.

There was no 2004 season due to poor ratings from the third and fourth seasons but the show was revived in 2005 with the hope that ratings would again return. Poor ratings for this season meant there have been no further seasons in Australia until 2013.

Williams was brought on to host the show because the previous host Grant Bowler was unavailable due to a prior commitment. Episodes were broadcast on Thursday nights (thus partially directly going head to head with a behind-the-scenes edition of Australian Idol) and the PG rating was brought back due to the show airing at 7:30 pm. In the first episode, as the elimination process was about to start, one of the production assistants accidentally yelled out: "It's Josh!" (in reference to the contestant who was about to be eliminated). Luckily, the contestants did not hear those words. Some eliminated contestants would appear on Sunrise the morning after their elimination.

It was also notable for being sponsored by the then-new PlayStation Portable, in which each contestant receives instructions and challenges by way of a memory card and on-screen displays.

The winner of The Mole, Liz Cantor, has since become a fill-in weather presenter on Seven News Brisbane.

=== Contestants ===
Over 4,000 people auditioned to be on the show. These are the twelve who were chosen:

Player	Age	Hometown	Occupation	Outcome
Josh Barker	27	Sydney	Rock Singer	11th Place
Sonya Fardell	40	Melbourne	Vet Nurse	10th Place
Brett McGrath	32	Queensland	Salesman	9th Place
Nat Amoore	25	Melbourne	Editing Assistant/Trapeze Artist	8th Place
Juan Garcia	26	Melbourne	Lawyer	7th Place
Mark Jensen	46	Sydney	Actor	6th Place
Heidi Monsour	30	Brisbane	Marketing Director	5th Place
Kristy Curtis	27	Sydney	Fitness Instructor	4th Place
Liane Bourke	38	Sydney	Housewife	3rd Place
Craig Murell	27	Sydney	Army Pilot	Runner up
John Whitehall	52	Sydney	Retired Detective	The Mole
Liz Cantor	22	Brisbane	Competitive Surfer	Winner

=== Elimination Chart ===
Elimination Chart
Player	1	2	3	4	5	6	7	8	9	10
Liz	IN	IN	IN	IN	IN	IN	IN	IN	IN	WINNER
John	IN	IN	IN	IN	IN	IN	IN	IN	IN	MOLE
Craig	IN	IN	IN	IN	IN	IN	IN	IN	IN	RUNNER-UP
Liane	IN	IN	IN	IN	IN	IN	IN	IN	OUT	
Kristy	IN	IN	IN	IN	IN	IN	IN	OUT		
Heidi	IN	IN	IN	IN	IN	IN	OUT			
Mark	IN	IN	IN	IN	IN	OUT				
Juan	IN	IN	IN	IN	OUT					
Nat	IN	IN	IN	OUT						
Brett	IN	IN	OUT							
Sonya	IN	OUT								
Josh	OUT									

Indicates the player won the game
Indicates the player was the mole
Indicates the player won a free pass
Indicates the player won an exemption, but either gave it back for money or lost it in a later assignment
Indicates the player scored the lowest on the quiz and was eliminated

==== How the contestants voted ====
This chart shows the answers the contestants answered to the question "Who is the Mole?" during the live eliminations.

Elimination Chart
	1	2	3	4	5	6	7	8	9	10
Liz	John	John	John	John	John	immunity	John	John	John	John
John	Nat	Kristy	Kristy	Liz	immunity	Liane	Heidi	Craig	Craig	Liz
Craig	Heidi	Brett	Brett	Nat	John	Liz	John	John	John	John
Liane	Nat	Nat	Mark	immunity	John	Liz	John	John	John	
Kristy	Brett	Brett	Brett	Juan	immunity	John	John	John		
Heidi	John	immunity	Craig	immunity	Craig	Craig	Craig			
Mark	Sonya	Sonya	Heidi	Kristy	Heidi	Craig				
Juan	Craig	Nat	Kristy	immunity	Mark					
Nat	Heidi	immunity	Heidi	Juan						
Brett	Liane	not known	Mark							
Sonya	Nat	Kristy								
Josh	Heidi									

== Episodes ==
=== Episode 1 ===
Episode 1 recap
Location: Queenstown, New Zealand
Assignment	Money earned	Possible earnings
Avalanche	$25,000	$25,000
Rungway	$15,000	$25,000
Current Kitty	$40,000	$50,000
Elimination
Josh	1st player eliminated	

Avalanche: The players met up for the first time on a snowy mountaintop in Queenstown, New Zealand. They were split into three groups of four and were given thirty minutes to find three avalanche beacons that had been hidden in the snow, to the north, east, and west of their starting position. Each group was given shovels and a receiver that would beep if it was within 40 meters of the beacon. The groups sent to the north and to the east found what they were looking for quickly - the group sent to the north found the beacon itself, while the group sent to the east found a locked black case. Upon returning to the starting position, they found that the north group's beacon had a dogtag on it that revealed the combination to one of the locks. Kristy, Heidi, Sonya, and John, sent to the west, initially went in the wrong direction and returned with their beacon with mere seconds on the clock. The group unlocked the black case in time, but what they found inside it was a second locked case. The host revealed that he had the key to that case, and to obtain it, nine of the players would have to spend the night in a snow cave. The three who were spared were Liz, Heidi, and Kristy. The other nine were told that if anyone asked to leave the snow cave, they could, but the money for the challenge would then be lost. All nine of them stayed the night in the snow cave, and the $25,000 was won.

Rungway: The players met up at the bottom of a hill with rungs attached to it. They were told to split into two groups of six, one group who would take an easier climb to the top of the hill, and one who would take a harder climb. Along both climbs were several envelopes with letters in them, to be used as part of an anagram puzzle on a board at the bottom of the hill. There were clues, of increasing obviousness, on the board that could be uncovered for $5,000, $10,000, and $15,000 from the kitty. They were told to retrieve the envelopes and not open them till they were back at the bottom of the hill, and to not unhook their carabiners from the line, or incur a $5,000 penalty. The group doing the easy climb followed the directions and retrieved their letters quickly, but the group doing the hard climb all climbed up the hill right past the letters and had to go back down to retrieve them, back up to the top again, and then finally back down to the bottom of the hill. After the group bought the $5,000 clue, "He is still alive," Liane from the team doing the easily climb solved the anagram before the team that had done the hard climb even returned to the starting position, getting the answer of Edmund Hillary. Along with the $5,000 price of the clue, Liz was revealed to have unhooked her carabiner on the hill, costing another $5,000.

- At the live elimination, after green screens came up for the first nine contestants, only Nat, Josh and Craig were at danger of being eliminated. Tom had opted to enter Nat's name first, but switched to Josh, for whom the screen turned red. Outside the studio for that elimination included season four contestants Kris, Nikki and that season's Mole, Petrina, as well as season three contestants Janet, Ann-Maree and Bob (the latter of which won the Weakest Link special).

=== Episode 2 ===
Episode 2 recap
Location: Southern Alps Christchurch, New Zealand
Assignment	Money earned	Possible earnings
Counting	$6,000	$25,000
Christchurch	$0	$25,000
Current Kitty	$46,000	$100,000
Free Passes
Heidi and Nat	Won in the "Christchurch" assignment	
Elimination
Sonya	2nd player eliminated	

Counting: The players met up at a farm at the foot of a mountain in the Southern Alps and split into three groups. Each group's task involved counting – one group had to count sheep, another needles in a haystack, and another baby chicks. Each team needed to get their count exactly right to win the challenge, and each wrong guess cost $1,000 from the kitty. The sheep team's first guess of 599 sheep was correct. The chick team first guessed 596, 601, and 600 before giving their correct answer, which was also 599. Upon reuniting with the host in a cabin, the two teams learned that there were 599 needles in the haystack that the other players had to count. The host radioed them and told them that if they would simply guess whether there were more or less than 600 needles in the haystack, they could quit counting and come inside. This guess would be worth $10,000 if correct, and would take away $10,000 if incorrect. After submitting a guess that there were 176 needles in the haystack, they decided to gamble and correctly guessed that there were less than 600 needles in the haystack, winning $6,000 (after penalties for wrong guesses).

Christchurch: After being chosen by the group as their two worst chess players, Heidi and Nat were told to cycle to the top of a hill in Christchurch, in a race against the other nine. The road they were to take was 9 kilometers in length, and after 6 kilometers, they met up with the host who offered them, for a penalty of $5,000 from the kitty, a ride in a helicopter to the top of the hill, which would likely ensure their victory. They refused this offer and continued cycling. The other nine players were to take a gondola lift to the top, which would take about ten minutes to ride, but had to first earn their tickets, needing to win an outdoor game of chess with oversized pieces against an eleven-year-old schoolgirl. If Heidi and Nat arrived at the top first, they would gain free passes to the next episode and no money would be won, but if the group of nine arrived first, they would win $25,000. Arriving at the board, the group of nine found that three of their pieces, the queen, a bishop, and a pawn, were missing and said to be in "obvious places." They found the queen in a park called Victoria Square, the bishop in a nearby church, and the pawn in a pawn shop. Craig and Brett did most of the work on the chessboard, and in fact lost the first game. They won the second, but upon arriving at the top of the hill after the gondola ride, they found that Heidi and Nat had arrived first, won exemptions, and denied the group any money.

=== Episode 3 ===
Episode 3 recap
Location: Bay of Islands
Assignment	Money earned	Possible earnings
Crayfish	$6,000	$15,000
Māori Waka	$0	$10,000
Hostage Rescue	$25,000	$25,000
Current Kitty	$77,000	$150,000
Elimination
Brett	3rd player eliminated	

Crayfish: After rowing a waka out to a large boat to meet the host, the players were instructed to dive for three pots, each of which contained ten crayfish. One pot was a meter below the surface, the second was two meters below, and the third four meters below. They were to split into duos, who would each have three minutes in the water, and each crayfish successfully retrieved would add $500 to the kitty. Brett and Liz each retrieved two crays and the others aside from Liane each got one, for a total of eleven and $5,500. The host rounded this up to $6,000 after the challenge concluded.

Māori Waka: The players were told to paddle the Māori waka, that they had earlier paddled out to the large boat, back to the beach, and were given a minute for each crayfish they retrieved. This was worth $10,000, but they finished in thirteen and a half minutes and won nothing.

Hostage Rescue: John and Liane were taken hostage by masked men and dumped in a nondescript room well away from the team's hotel. The other eight were told to find them within two hours to win $25,000. They had at their disposal three means of transport - a car, a helicopter, and a boat. All three teams needed to be present to free the hostages. Each of the groups was given an intermediate destination where they would find a clue, which was a key and a mobile phone attached to a buoy. Each key opened one of three locks on the hostages' cell. Once the groups found their mobiles, they were able to contact John and Liane, who figured out that they were in a police station, and based on a clue that they found in their cell, figured out that they were in the town of Russell, New Zealand. The helicopter and boat teams arrived at the hostages' cell in plenty of time, but the car team of Juan, Liz, and Kristy did not immediately take off from the starting position and were too far away by road to make it to the hostages in time when all was figured out. However, the boat cut across a bay and was able to bring them to the cell just before time ran out, winning the $25,000.

=== Episode 4 ===
Episode 4 recap
Location: Wellington, New Zealand
Assignment	Money earned	Possible earnings
Election	$25,000	$25,000
Shooting	$0	$25,000
Current Kitty	$102,000	$200,000
Free Passes
Heidi, Juan, and Liane	Won in the "Shooting" assignment	
Elimination
Nat	4th player eliminated	

Election: On the plane trip back, the players were informed that New Zealand was shortly to have a national election and that their next assignment was to land in Wellington, New Zealand's capital, to obtain 100 signatures of New Zealanders on a petition stating that New Zealand should give up its independence and become the seventh state of Australia. They split into three groups, with each using a different means to get the word out. After their advertisements had been out for a short while, each group was given two hours in downtown Wellington to actually collect, among them all, the 100 signatures. They were told that each person must know precisely what they were signing if the signature was to count. The host waited for them at the Beehive. After the groups reunited, very shortly prior to the deadline, it was determined that Craig, Heidi, and Liane had bent the rules in obtaining their signatures, and very few of them counted toward the necessary total of 100. The group wound up surpassing that total anyway, however, winning the $25,000.

Shooting: The group selected their six best shooters. They were given the task of shooting ten clay pigeons, for $25,000. The catch was that from their shooting position, there was no ammo present. A kilometer away was an ammo dump, and the six shooters would start there, take one round, and ride a quad bike to the shooting position where they'd get one shot at a clay pigeon, turn around, go back, and start all over again. The three who were left out, Juan, Liane, and Heidi, would be snipers, trying to hit each shooter on the course with paintball guns. If all six were shooters were successfully taken out, no money would be won and the three snipers would all win free passes to the next episode. Heidi and Liane took positions on a ridge overlooking the quad bike course, while Juan sniped from a helicopter. Craig, Nat, and Kristy were taken out of the game very quickly. John and Mark each made multiple successful runs, eventually figuring out that the helicopter had to land and reload every time Juan fired 200 shots, meaning there would occasionally be a window of opportunity when they faced little resistance to getting to the shooting position. Liz only left the safety of the covered ammo dump once, to draw fire away from Mark, eliminating herself but allowing Mark another safe run. Mark successfully shot two clay pigeons before he was eliminated. John was the last shooter standing and successfully shot six targets, but was eventually hit by Juan from the helicopter, which denied the group the money and won each of the snipers a free pass to the next episode.

=== Episode 5 ===
Episode 5 recap
Location: Kingston, New Zealand
Assignment	Money earned	Possible earnings
Canyon Swing	$6,000	$20,000
Bungee Jump	-$5,000	$5,000
Kingston Flyer	$0	$25,000
Current Kitty	$103,000	$250,000
Free Passes
John and Kristy	Won in the "Kingston Flyer" assignment	
Elimination
Juan	5th player eliminated	

Canyon Swing: The host told the players to pick four adrenaline junkies. These four were Juan, Heidi, Liane, and Craig, who were harnessed to an extremely long cable and placed at one edge of a wide, deep canyon, in what was called "the world's largest swing." The other four had to, in turn, answer a series of four questions about the other players, questions such as "Who was an extra on Dynasty?", "Who is a Spice Girls fan?" and "Who keeps worms as pets?" Each correct answer was worth $1,000 for the group kitty, but one wrong answer ended their chances of winning any further money and doomed one of the adrenaline junkies to take the plunge. Kristy answered all her questions correctly and earned $4,000 for the kitty - she was paired with Juan, who, in agreeing to take the drop anyway, earned another $1,000, revealing that the challenge was potentially worth $20,000. The only other money came from Mark answering one question correctly before missing his second and dooming Liane to take the swing. John and Liz both missed their first questions, sending Heidi and Craig, respectively, for the ride.

Bungee Jump: The four players who did not do the Canyon Swing were told that they were to bungee jump off a bridge and touch a beach ball that the other four, in a boat in the water below, would release just as they jumped. The cable was of such a length that the jumper would briefly be submerged in the water at the end of their jump. The team could win $5,000 if any one jumper touched the ball, but if any of them outright refused to jump, $5,000 would be removed from the kitty. John happily jumped first, but badly missed the ball. Kristy and Liz were both terrified, but jumped, and narrowly missed the ball. Mark refused to jump and cost the team $5,000 from the kitty.

Kingston Flyer: The group decided on two people that they thought deserved a chance at immunity from elimination, choosing John and Kristy. The next assignment involved the historic Kingston Flyer train. John and Kristy were placed in the engine room, driving the Flyer, and would gain free passes through to the next episode if it arrived in Kingston, 10 kilometers from the starting position, before the others, split into three duos, finished their mini-tasks. Craig and Heidi were placed in a second-class cabin and had to search through one thousand ripped tickets to find the half that matched up with one they'd been given to form a completed ticket. Mark and Liane were in first-class and had to take a bundle of clothes belonging to the players and correctly dress mannequins representing each of them. Juan and Liz were in the buffet, and had to prepare scones and Devonshire tea. Craig and Heidi completed their task in short order, and Juan was revealed to be a skilled cook, easily preparing scones that passed muster. Mark and Liane were one swap of clothes away from having all the mannequins correctly dressed on three different occasions, but never did get the full correct answer, giving John and Kristy free passes and keeping the money from the kitty.

=== Episode 6 ===
Episode 6 recap
Location: Waitomo Caves, New Zealand
Assignment	Money earned	Possible earnings
Caving	$16,000	$25,000
Jetboating	-$5,000	$25,000
Current Kitty	$114,000	$300,000
Free Passes
Liz	Won in the "Jetboating" assignment	
Elimination
Mark	6th player eliminated	

Caving: This multi-faceted challenge first involved the group picking their two best tour guides, Mark and Heidi. These two were to take a group of real tourists through one of the Waitomo Caves and try to pass themselves off as genuine tour guides but had to as well chirp like a kookaburra, burst into tears, and get the tourists to take part in a group hug. Heidi passed off a bird sound as way for the tourists to spot an endangered bird, cried, purportedly, about her dog dying, and the two of them achieved the group hug simply by asking. Meanwhile, the other five players had to take part in an actual day of caving, through what was called "The Scary Cave," needing to find five PlayStation Portables with their names on them deep within the cave. Each PSP successfully retrieved earned $4,000 for the kitty. This challenge proved as difficult mentally as it was physically for some players, particularly Craig who hated being in water and was suffering from claustrophobia. The players were expressly told to follow the trail of blue glow sticks in the cave and though they were allowed to separate, they must not leave anyone behind. All five PSP's were successfully retrieved, but the players who did the caving would only earn their money if at least one of the tourists that Mark and Heidi led graded their performance as excellent. Four tourists graded them as average, but the other eleven all gave them excellent marks, earning the money. Mark and Heidi were then offered to add more money to the kitty if they'd spend the night in the cave through which they'd led the tourists. It was initially an offer of $5,000, that would be decreased by $1,000 apiece if the players who had done the caving would afford them food or camping gear for the night. The cavers gave them the camping gear, but not the food, and $4,000 was added to the kitty for the two of them spending the night in the cave.

It was revealed the next day that Craig and John had broken the rules by not directly following the trail of glow sticks while deep in the cave, so the $4,000 from their PSPs were revoked, giving a final total for this challenge of $16,000.

Jetboating: Each player took a lap on a jetboat course, retrieving an envelope with their name on it from a buoy on the far side and bringing it back to the starting dock. The player to record the fastest lap would be eligible to earn a free pass, and that player was Liz, completing the course one second faster than Craig had minutes earlier. With Liz pulled aside, the other six players were given a second mission on the jetboat course, to retrieve another envelope with their name on it and bring it back to the starting dock. These envelopes contained puzzle pieces, and within eight minutes, each player had to bring back their puzzle piece and the puzzle had to be solved to win $25,000 and deny Liz the free pass. They were also told that if anyone left the dock with their seatbelt unfastened, they would have to do an additional lap, and that for each minute over eight it took them to finish the challenge, $5,000 would be taken from the kitty. In this second round, there were several mistakes made: Heidi crashed into a wall, Liane knocked Mark's piece from the buoy into the water, Mark had to make two passes at the dock when returning with his piece, John left the dock with his seatbelt unfastened and had to do a second lap, and Kristy was also forced into doing a second lap (after time had already run out) when she tried to desperately fling her puzzle piece, the last, to the others on the dock, and it fell in the water. They wound up needing over nine minutes to finish the assignment, costing $5,000 from the kitty and assuring Liz a free pass through to the next episode.

=== Episode 7 ===
Episode 7 recap
Location: Rotorua, New Zealand
Assignment	Money earned	Possible earnings
Mud	$10,000	$35,000
Four-Wheel Drive	$25,000	$25,000
Current Kitty	$149,000	$360,000
Free Passes
—	Craig and John failed to evade identification in the "Mud" assignment	
Elimination
Heidi	7th player eliminated	

Mud: The players met up with the host at Hells Gate in Rotorua, and were divided by sex. The women had to cook corn and eggs the traditional Māori way, by lowering baskets full of them from a height into hot springs down below. For each dollar they made selling eggs and corn to locals, they would win $100 for the group kitty, at a maximum of $25,000. They were given an hour. The money, however, was locked in a safe, and two of them had to search through a mud pool for dogtags bearing the combination to the safe. Heidi and Liane cooked the food and made $172, which the host rounded up to $18,000 potential winnings. Liz and Kristy searched the mud pool for the dogtags and found only two of them, the first two digits to the four-digit safe combination, which were both 6. They delivered the two dogtags to Liane and Heidi and kept looking, but before they found the third dogtag, Liz figured out that the combination would be the word MOLE on a telephone keypad, 6653, since that was borne out by the first two digits both being 6. As they raced to Liane and Heidi's position, the other two tried two unsuccessful combinations before hearing the solution. The safe would lock for three minutes after a third incorrect guess, and their time ticked under three minutes as Liane and Heidi waited for Liz and Kristy to get close enough to them to tell them the solution. When she saw the safe's keypad, Liz told Heidi to key in 6642, since the number 1 on the safe had the letters A, B, and C where on a telephone it has no letters. This guess was incorrect, and they did not have time to try again. The host revealed, when the time ran out, that 6653 was indeed the correct combination.

Meanwhile, Craig and John were sent to find men in the town of Rotorua who could reasonably pass for each of them. They found eighteen men, and the twenty of them covered themselves in mud and wore masks, forming a lineup for the women. The women were told to pick Craig and John out of the lineup, and that they would win $5,000 for whoever they could pick out, but if they chose someone thinking it was Craig or John and it was not, the man they failed to identify would win a free pass through to the next episode. The women quickly identified John, and took a guess for Craig as their time was running out. Even when Craig took his mask off, no one was quite sure it was him, but it indeed was, and $10,000 was won.

Four-Wheel Drive: The players were told to pair up, a driver and a navigator, for a forest course that they were to tackle in off-road vehicles. They were given a practice run to familiarize themselves with the course, but upon returning to the starting position, they were told that for the real run, the navigators and drivers would have to switch positions, and the drivers would be blindfolded. The drivers would lose $5,000 from the kitty if their blindfolds were taken off, even just an inch, and the same penalty would be assessed if a navigator touched the steering wheel. There was a 30-minute time limit and $25,000 to be won. Craig and John, who had both had experience driving big vehicles, had initially volunteered as drivers, but this twist meant Liz and Heidi had to drive when it counted. Liane and Kristy easily made it through the course, but Liz's car became stuck on the side of the course for several minutes until John came to that position in the next car and was able to help Craig push it back onto the course. Liz's blindfold also came off, seemingly by accident, and she kept her eyes tightly closed as she retrieved it. All three teams narrowly finished within the time limit, and it was decided that Liz had followed the spirit of the rules by keeping her eyes closed, so no penalty from the kitty was assessed.

- At the live elimination, Heidi's name was the first typed in the elimination screen, and the screen turned red. Thus, she became the first contestant since David in season three to have the first name typed in and the screen turn red.

=== Episode 8 ===
Episode 8 recap
Location: Southern Alps
Assignment	Money earned	Possible earnings
Orienteering	$4,000	$24,000
Bobcat Basketball	$18,000	$25,000
Free Pass Temptation	-$25,000	$0
Free Pass Refund	$50,000	$50,000
Current Kitty	$196,000	$434,000
Free Passes
—	Liane bought a free pass with $25,000 from the kitty during Bobcat Basketball, but gave it back for that amount of money to instead be added to the kitty.	
Elimination
Kristy	8th player eliminated	

Orienteering: The players were assigned to camp out in the countryside on a night when the temperature was forecast to drop to -5 °C. Their camping gear was hidden in the area in front of them. They were told to split into two duos and one player left on his own to hunt for their gear. They had two hours to get to find their gear and return to form their campsite at the starting position. They were given maps and GPS's to help them find the bags. At each of three locations, the players were presented with a choice of either camping gear or money for the group kitty - the first choice was $1,000 or some food, the second was $2,000 or sleeping bags and mats, and the third was $5,000 or a tent. Craig, who was on his own, chose the gear every time, while Liane and Kristy chose $6,000 and the sleeping mats, and John and Liz opted for the money at each site. Craig, Liane, and Kristy returned to the starting position well before the time limit, but John and Liz, mistakenly traveling over a hill when the fastest way would have been around it, were too late and their money did not count. The host came back to them late in the night and offered two beds in a camper van, for $2,000 from the kitty. Liane and Kristy took the opportunity to get out of the cold, reducing the group's winnings for this assignment to $4,000.

Bobcat Basketball: The players were taken to a construction site and put behind the wheels of Bobcats and mini-excavators. John, Liz, and Kristy had to take soccer balls, floating in a pool of water, grab them with the excavator, and take them to Craig and Liane who waited at the halfway point with Bobcats. Craig and Liane had to take the balls to the basket and drop them in for them to count. Each of the 25 balls was worth $1,000 if it made it successfully to the basket. John and Craig both did very well at this challenge, getting almost every ball they scooped into the basket. Kristy failed to even get one ball to the halfway point.

Free Pass Temptation: During Bobcat Basketball, the host secretively asked each player how much money they would pay from the kitty to earn a free pass through to the next episode. Kristy bid $13,000, Liane bid $25,000, Craig bid $10,000, and John and Liz both declined to place a bid at all. Liane was awarded the free pass for $25,000. The others were shocked at her high bid.

Free Pass Refund: During the elimination, Tom asked Liane if she'd give up the free pass for $50,000. This was consisting of the $25,000 she bidded for the free pass, and a $25,000 bonus. She instantly accepted this offer, increasing the kitty. But because the computer test had not been taken yet (unlike season 3 where the free pass was awarded after the tests had been taken) Liane still had to do the test. Some of the other players found it suspicious, as the Mole is told beforehand what most of the assignments are. In Liane's case, the players thought she was trying look like a hero and look less like the Mole.

Liane's name was typed in first, and the green screen appeared, relieving her. Kristy's name was typed in second, and the screen turned red.

=== Episode 9 ===
Episode 9 recap
Location: Auckland, New Zealand
Assignment	Money earned	Possible earnings
Sky Tower	$23,000	$25,000
Free pass	-$25,000	$0
Night Maze	$15,000	$25,000
Current Kitty	$209,000	$484,000
Free Passes
—	The group failed to unanimously choose someone to get the last free pass.	
Elimination
Liane	9th player eliminated	

Sky Tower: Craig and Liz met up with the host in Auckland, who told them that John and Liane were up very high in the Sky Tower; Liane was outside on a small ledge on the 61st floor, and John was in the crow's nest. Craig and Liz's assignment was to, within an hour, get to them using the 1,462 stairs to Liane on the observation deck, and once there climb up the center of the tower to get to John. On the way, in the stairwell, there were pictures of the fifty states of the United States of America, and they were told to remember them. John and Liane's assignment also involved the states, as they had to simply recall them from memory. Liane was also encouraged to talk to the people on the other side of the glass on the observation deck, and happened to encounter an American tourist who helped her get all the correct states. Craig and Liz arrived to Liane, and subsequently to John, in time. John had written all of his and Liane's answers on a white board, and once the four of them were together, they were told to discard the white board and recite the fifty states from memory, within five minutes. Each state correctly named would earn $500 for the kitty. They got 46 states correct, neglecting only Michigan, Connecticut, Kansas, and Louisiana.

Free pass: On a yacht to their next location, the host told the players they must unanimously assign a free pass through to the final round to one player, or lose $25,000 from the kitty. They seemed at one point to agree, albeit grudgingly, to give the free pass to John, who had said he'd rather lose the money and keep the playing field level but would take it if they offered it to him. Upon arriving at their destination, however, Liz backed out and would not agree to vote for John, which cost $25,000 from the kitty.

Night Maze: The four players were faced with a life-sized hedge maze in the dead of night and told that they must retrieve five light beacons from within the maze, each worth $5,000. Also in the maze was a hunter, and if the hunter tagged a player, he was out. Additionally, if the player was carrying any beacons when he was tagged, the beacons would be out of play. The others could monitor the progress of the runner (and the hunter) on an overhead camera shot and guide the runner. John ran first and was tagged by the hunter while carrying two beacons. The other three all successfully retrieved one of the remaining beacons each, winning $15,000.

=== Episode 10 ===
Episode 10 recap
Location: Queenstown, New Zealand
Assignment	Money earned	Possible earnings
Extreme Challenges	$0	$25,000
Two Questions	-$6,000	$30,000
Final Kitty	$203,000	$539,000
The Reveal
Craig	The Runner-Up	
Liz	The winner of $203,000	
John	The Mole	

Extreme Challenges: One by one, the players each received a harrowing or physically difficult challenge, chosen at random: Liz had to do a tandem parachute jump from a height of 5 kilometers, Craig had to bungee jump from a height of 134 meters (three times the height of the bungee jump that took place earlier in the season), and John had to spend half an hour as a passenger in a stunt plane doing aerial acrobatics without vomiting. As each prepared for their task, the twist was revealed - $25,000 would only be won if exactly two of them, no more and no less, went through with their challenges. All three ended up speculating that someone else would back out and went through with their challenges themselves, so no money was won.

Two Questions: The last challenge took place on another boat trip. One at a time, each player answered two morality questions where the choices were the other two players, such as "Who is more likely to leave a note with their phone number on the windshield of a parked car they accidentally hit, Liz or John?" The other two were given $10,000 from the kitty to bet on the answers the other player gave, and could bet between $1,000 and $5,000 on each question. Liz and John got both of Craig's questions wrong and lost $7,000. Craig and John got one of Liz's questions right and one wrong, finishing at even money. Craig and Liz got one of John's questions right and one wrong, finishing $1,000 ahead and thus losing $6,000 all told for this assignment.

For this last round only, the quiz was done prior to the live portion of the show. Each player was locked into a compartment on the Kingston Flyer, one of the assignments on an earlier episode, to take the final test. The host unlocked the winner's compartment, and Liz emerged onto the stage in Sydney, winning the $203,000. The host then told her to open the Mole's door, and she uncovered John. Since she had correctly identified John as the Mole on the quiz, he did not get to keep the money kept from the group kitty, but was presented with two tickets for a holiday to Rarotonga. Craig ended up being the runner-up. Liz had suspected John as the Mole in the quizzes right from the very start.

Tom admitted John had him fooled, as he thought Liane was the mole.

Bob from season 3 made another appearance outside the studio during the Mole reveal.

== Mole Activity ==
=== Sabotage ===
The following acts of sabotage were revealed in the final episode:

Christchurch: John's onscreen profile listed him an avid chess player, but he did nothing to help Craig win the first game, and only spoke up in the second when the team was already in position to win.

Crayfish: John's profile also listed him as a strong swimmer, but he only retrieved one cray, from the easiest pot, and feigned fatigue when returning to the boat.

Māori Waka: Another of John's hobbies is canoeing, but in this assignment, he purposely used a poor rowing stroke that slowed the waka down and kept them from winning the $10,000.

Hostage Rescue: John knew immediately that he and Liane had been taken to a police holding cell (this was also called a clue, as John's vocation was a police detective). He did not volunteer this information to Liane or the rescuers and tried to waste time having Liane sit on his shoulders to look out a window and pick out landmarks that weren't of much help on their own. However, when Liane figured out the clue in the cell that told them the city they were in, and the players resourcefully sent the boat to retrieve the car team, the group wound up winning this $25,000 anyway.

Shooting: John tried to look like the hero in this challenge, making six successful runs for ammo and hitting the clay target each time he got back to the shooting position. He needed only to crash his quad bike once to make himself an easy target for Juan in the helicopter to keep this $25,000 from ultimately being won.

Canyon Swing: John purposely missed an easy question when Heidi was attached to the canyon swing. The question he was asked was: "Who is a Spice Girls fan?", to which John answered "Kristy", when in fact the correct answer was "Juan". Kristy reveals in her confessional that "you couldn't tell me who was a Spice Girls fan and who wasn't. That was probably the easiest question out of everyone's".

Caving: John pointed Craig away from the path of the blue glow sticks deep in the cave, knowing full well that it was the wrong way, and cost the kitty another $8,000.

Jetboating: John intentionally left the dock with his seatbelt unfastened, pretending to fumble with it, and had to do an extra lap.

Orienteering: John held the map in his duo with Liz, but never once used it. He allowed Liz to lead them, based on her GPS, over the hill to base camp, when he knew that was the wrong way and they'd never make it on time. Only when Liz took the map did they head to the correct route around the hill, but by then it was too late and another $8,000 was lost.

Night Maze: John not only allowed himself to get caught by the hunter, but purposely took a turn divergent from Craig's directions, taking a second beacon that was put out of play for a loss of $10,000.

The following act of sabotage was spotted during the series, but not mentioned in the final episode:

Avalanche: John led his group the wrong way and in doing so took a long time to search for the beacon, almost costing the assignment.

=== Clues ===
The following clues were revealed in the final episode:

Profiles Clue: Below the pictures in the onscreen profiles was Braille writing, that initially said "Who is the traitor?" The first word changed each week for the next eight weeks, and those words spelled out "The Mole is going to reveal himself tonight." This meant the Mole was a man. Also in the profiles, as the facts cycled in and out, numbers were apparent on the screen, and they were an alphabet code (where 1=A, 2=B, and so on). The messages spelled out "The Mole is not ___" a different player each week, and in week nine, it spelled out "The Mole is not Craig." Although not shown on the final segment, in week 10, it said: "The Mole is John". Since the Braille writing indicated that the Mole was a man, that cancels Liz of being the traitor. This left only John.

599: The magic number from the counting challenge was itself a clue, one that Liz was said to have picked up upon. The number 599 can be converted by telephone code to JWW, the initials of John William Whitehall, the Mole.

The following clues were spotted during the series, but not mentioned in the final episode:

Main Title Clue: At every main title introduction throughout the entire show, John was the 4th person to be shown. The word MOLE has 4 letters in it suggesting that John is the mole.

Before the Final Questionnaire: Before the contestants took their final questionnaire, John could be seen wearing a jacket that says "The Mole" on the front and back.

John later claimed that he had attempted a sabotage in every challenge except the very first one, and some parts of his 'confession' referring to them simply weren't aired.
