= The Mole (Australian TV series) season 4 =

The Mole
- Season 4
- No. of episodes: 10

Release
- Original network: Seven Network
- Original release: 27 July – 28 September 2003

Season chronology
- ← Previous; Season 3 Next → Season 5

The fourth season of the Australian version of The Mole, subtitled The Mole in Paradise, took place mostly in New Caledonia and was hosted by Grant Bowler.

== Show Details ==
This season had a higher announced maximum kitty than previous seasons, touting the maximum amount to be won to be $500,000. However, the final total in the group kitty was comparable with that of previous seasons, at $104,000. The first episode of this season took place in Sydney, with the host revealing during the elimination that nine of them, minus the player who was to be eliminated, would head to New Caledonia for the remainder of the season.

This season almost did not go ahead due to poor ratings attained from the previous season. This showed with the fourth series being aired later on in the year. Unlike in previous seasons where the show was given a PG rating, this season was given a G rating. Additionally, the show screened on Sunday nights rather than the previous timeslot of Wednesday nights, partly due to its unpopularity in its previous timeslot, and the entire series was aired throughout July to September 2003. Filming took place during May to June in 2003.

Casting was handled by newspaper advertisements. Thousands of individuals responded, and these ten were the ones that were chosen:

Player	Age	Hometown	Occupation	Outcome
Stace Callaghan	32	Brisbane, Queensland	Masseuse	9th Place
Greg Harding	54	Craigieburn, Victoria	Manager	8th Place
Josh Kennedy-White	34	Elizabeth Bay, New South Wales	Public relations	7th Place
Nikki Hosking	19	Avalon, New South Wales	Cheerleader	6th Place
Krissy Stanley	53	Oyster Bay, New South Wales	Sales representative	5th Place
Alison Lyford-Pike	24	Brighton, Victoria	Musician	4th Place
Cam Villani	26	Blackburn, Victoria	Firefighter	3rd Place
Nathan Beves	22	Cronulla, New South Wales	Stevedore	Runner-up
Petrina Edge	24	Petersham, New South Wales	Sales assistant	The Mole
Shaun Faulkner	22	Barraba, New South Wales	Security guard	Winner

=== Elimination Chart ===
Elimination Chart
Player	1	2	3	4	5	6	7	8	9	10
Shaun	IN	IN	IN	IN	IN	IN	IN	IN	IN	WINNER
Petrina	IN	IN	IN	IN	OUT	IN	IN	IN	IN	MOLE
Nathan	IN	IN	IN	IN	IN	IN	IN	IN	IN	RUNNER-UP
Cam	IN	IN	OUT	IN	IN	IN	IN	IN	OUT	
Alison	IN	IN	IN	IN	IN	IN	IN	OUT		
Kris	IN	IN	IN	IN	IN	IN	OUT			
Nikki	IN	IN	IN	IN	IN	OUT				
Josh	IN	IN	IN	OUT						
Greg	IN	OUT								
Stace	OUT									

Indicates the player won the game
Indicates the player was the mole
Indicates the player won a free pass
Indicates that the player was originally eliminated, but was brought back in a twist
Indicates the player scored the lowest on the quiz and was eliminated

Indicates the player tied for the lowest score on the quiz, but had a faster time

== Episodes ==
=== Episode 1 ===
Episode 1 recap Original airdate: 27 July 2003
Location: Sydney, Australia
Assignment	Money earned	Possible earnings
Arrival Game	$2,000	$5,000
Mole Air	$6,000	$8,000
Luggage Repack	$27,000	$100,000
Parachute Safe	$1,000	$7,000
Current Kitty	$36,000	$120,000
Elimination
Stace	1st player eliminated	

Arrival Game: The players met up in five different locations in Sydney, in pairs, each of them near a phone. To start this assignment, the host called Nathan and Alison and told them to find a safe in town hall. Inside it were instructions, and if they could open the safe within three minutes, they'd win $1,000. They encountered a sign that said "PHONE = 74663, MOLE = ????" They correctly figured that the combination would be the word MOLE spelled out on a telephone keypad, but in their haste they did not enter the correct digits, which were 6653. The host then called them on a mobile that had been stashed above the sign and told them the correct combination. They then opened the safe, found another mobile, and were directed to give the same instructions they'd gotten from the host to Kris and Greg, who were in a bus station, and had to go to the locker room to find their safe. Kris and Greg were presented with a math puzzle to get their combination, which they successfully solved, with the answer 1100, to win $1,000. They in turn sent directions to Cam and Nikki, who were at a pier. The combination to their safe was the number of days the younger of them had been alive. That was 19-year-old Nikki, but time ran out before they figured out the correct answer. The host phoned them after their time was up to tell them their combination was 6964, and to give the directions to Stace and Josh. Their safe was across the street from their starting position by a phone box. Their puzzle was "THE MOLE = 3345. A TRAITOR = ????" Josh instantly solved this, winning $1,000, though neither the correct answer nor his reasoning were revealed (the answer was later revealed to be 1101). They in turn gave the assignment's directions to Shaun and Petrina, who had to find their puzzle on another phone box and enter it into the safe, which was inside a car. They had to add the year of federation to "two fat ladies," the Melbourne GPO postal code, and the number of seconds in an hour. They failed to find their correct combination of 8590, and upon opening the safe were told that their car would take them to the airport, where the other eight were also headed.

Mole Air: Upon arriving at the airport, the players met up for the first time as a group and all but Greg and Shaun boarded "Mole Air flight 007." The other eight were to skydive from a height of . At the hotel, the host presented Greg and Shaun with their assignment – they had to correctly guess which of the other eight would jump, and which would not. Each correct guess was worth $1,000 for the kitty, but each incorrect guess would take $1,000 away from the kitty. They predicted everyone but Josh and Kris would jump. Before jumping, each player in the plane was given a 4-digit number and told to remember it. Everyone but Kris jumped, meaning that seven of the picks were correct and one incorrect, so $6,000 was won.

Luggage Repack: The men were given five minutes to unpack as much from the women's luggage as they saw fit, and for each kilogram that they took away, $1,000 would be added to the kitty, at a maximum of 100 kilos. The women walked into the hotel midway through the assignment and were able to watch the men rooting through their bags, and were also informed that whatever was taken away by the men would be gone for the rest of the game. The other four all removed lots of belongings from the others' bags, but Nathan only removed a small number of light items from Kris' bag. They removed 27 kilograms of luggage, adding $27,000 to the group kitty.

Parachute Safe: Each of the seven people who jumped from the airplane were given a safe and told that the number they were given before jumping was the combination to open it. Each player who successfully opened their safe would win $1,000 for the kitty, but each player who failed would cost the kitty $1,000. Alison, Petrina, and Josh failed to open their safes, but the other four who jumped all remembered their numbers, putting the group $1,000 ahead for this assignment.

=== Episode 2 ===
Episode 2 recap Original airdate: 3 August 2003
Location: Nouméa, New Caledonia
Assignment	Money earned	Possible earnings
Player Info	-$18,000	$9,000
Dam Relay Race	$0	$10,000
Crossword	$3,000	$10,000
Current Kitty	$21,000	$149,000
Elimination
Greg	2nd player eliminated (tied for lowest score, slower time)	

Player Info: On the plane to New Caledonia, the players were each presented with an iPAQ that automatically scrolled through profile information on another player. They guarded the information they'd been given, but upon landing and meeting up with the host at the lunch table at their hotel, they discovered that part of this challenge was a teamwork-building exercise; each of them, except for Shaun, was asked a question based on the information presented to someone else. The questions would win $1,000 for the group kitty if answered correctly, and take $2,000 out of the kitty if answered wrong or not answered within five seconds. All nine players missed their question, and $18,000 was lost.

Dam Relay Race: The players were taken to the Yate Dam, and told to traverse a gap, 75 meters in elevation and bridged by two ropes. The players were to walk the rope, grasping the top one for balance, and get from one side to the other. The catch was that they were also wearing heart rate monitors, and each time their heart rates went above 160 beats per minute, they were forced to stop in place and wait for their heart rate to go down. They were given an hour for all of them to go down the ladder, cross the gap, and climb the ladder on the side. If the team decided someone's heart rate was hopelessly too high, they could pull them out, but it would incur a 10-minute penalty, and all time that was taken to that point would also count. It was worth $10,000. Josh and Petrina were stopped several times while on the rope, with Petrina not even making it across – the group decided to pull her out. Shaun was stopped twice, and Nathan once; everyone else made it across without incident. The last player was Kris, who was very afraid of the assignment and her heart rate topped 160 on the ladder and in climbing over the ledge and onto the wire. Just as she was about to continue on the rope, time for the challenge ran out.

Crossword: The players met the host at a park, and were presented with a giant crossword puzzle. The clues for the crossword puzzle were in a separate location, and six players took motorbikes to them. The others stayed behind and put oversized letter and number tiles on the crossword board to complete the puzzle. There was a 30-minute time limit, with hints available from the host for $1,000 apiece. The crossword clues were earned based on brainteasers presented to each pair of players. Each duo, Alison and Petrina, Josh and Greg, and Kris and Nathan, were presented with the same three brainteasers, and each correct answer would give them a computer chip to put in their iPAQ, and that would give a clue to the crossword puzzle for Cam, Shaun, and Nikki. Kris and Nathan needed to buy the answer to solve the first brainteaser, costing $1,000. Josh and Greg, and Alison and Petrina needed to buy the answer for the second. Each duo solved the third brainteaser without help from the host. Back at the crossword board, Cam convinced the other two to buy a crossword clue that they'd already received from one of the other players, costing $1,000. They also had to buy one answer for $2,000. They also had an incorrect answer on their final board, costing another $1,000. All these deductions knocked the $10,000 winnings down to $3,000.

- Shaun, who tied with Greg for the lowest score on the computer quiz, was relieved when the green screen appeared. After Greg's name was typed in and the screen turned red, Shaun, Nathan and Josh were all jubilant, despite the nature of Greg's departure.

=== Episode 3 ===
Episode 3 recap Original airdate: 10 August 2003
Location: Nouméa, New Caledonia
Assignment	Money earned	Possible earnings
Helibombing	$13,000	$60,000
Underwater	$5,000	$5,000
Photography	-$3,000	$10,000
Current Kitty	$36,000	$224,000
Elimination
Cam	Appeared to be the 3rd player eliminated	

Luggage Repack: Though not a monetary challenge, Petrina and Nikki were instructed to remove from the men's luggage the same amount that they had removed from the women's in the first episode, and if successful, they'd win back everything the women had lost in the first luggage repack. With the other six all sent away for an assignment, the two of them were given the keys to the men's rooms and free rein, and succeeded in removing enough luggage from the men to win back what they had earlier lost.

Helibombing: The other six were sent away for an assignment. They were put into pairs, with one hanging from a helicopter and dropping a flour bomb on a target being towed by a boat 40 meters below them, with the other in the chopper instructing the pilot. Each pair could conceivably win $20,000, the value of a bullseye on the target. They each got three passes at the target – the first was for free, the second cost $1,000 from the kitty, and the third $2,000. The first duo, Shaun in the chopper and Josh hanging below, missed the first pass but scored a bullseye on the second, winning $19,000. The second pair, Nathan in the helicopter and Alison down below, missed on all three attempts and cost $3,000. The third pair, Kris in the helicopter and Cam hanging, also whiffed on all three attempts, giving a final winnings in this assignment of $13,000.

Underwater: The players were divided by sex for simultaneous challenges as part of the same assignment. The men were told to dive underwater, using old-fashioned diving helmets, and they would find the clothes that Nikki and Petrina took earlier on. To complete their half of the assignment, they need only get dressed – while underwater. This included underwear, socks, shoes, trousers, and shirts. The women had to dive for jigsaw pieces in the water and complete a puzzle on the deck of the catamaran on which they were traveling. There were 12 correct pieces, but catch was that each time they pulled up a piece that was a duplicate of a piece they'd already pulled up, they'd be assessed a one-minute penalty to the 40 minute time limit that applied to both challenges (both had to be done in a combined time of under 40 minutes). Completing both challenges under the time limit would be worth $5,000 for the kitty. The women completed their task quickly, but Nikki, who was doing the bulk of the diving, pulled up several duplicates that resulted in penalty minutes. The men took 25 minutes to get dressed. The women completed the puzzle in 8 minutes and had 6 minutes in penalties, giving a combined time of 39 minutes and narrow success in the assignment.

Photography: The players were split into three groups and assigned to take nine photographs or videos involving townspeople. Getting eight out of the nine would win $10,000 for the kitty, but if fewer than eight were recorded, each one under that threshold would cost $1,000 from the kitty. The first was to take a picture of themselves with ten strangers, all of whom must be over 18 and everyone must be looking directly into the camera. They all completed this quickly, but Kris, Nathan, and Alison were a person short and had to do it again. The next task was for Cam and Petrina (and subsequently Nathan and Alison, and Josh and Nikki from the groups of three) to take a photo wearing one another's clothes, except for underwear. The third task was to record 15 seconds of a New Caledonian local, who must again be an adult, singing the chorus of Waltzing Matilda in English. Nathan, Kris, and Alison were behind the other groups in time and only barely made it back to the hotel before their one-hour time limit was up. All of Josh, Nikki, and Shaun's pictures counted, but the local that Nathan, Kris, and Alison recorded singing "Waltzing Matilda" was clearly under the age of 18. Additionally, the memory chip that Cam and Petrina handed in had nothing at all on it, so only five of the events counted, costing the group $3,000 from the kitty.

After the elimination, where Cam received the red screen and got in the car to leave the game, the host informed the remaining players that they were to privately vote as to whether they'd like Cam returned to the game. If even one person voted to return him to the game, it would be done, and $50,000 would be added to the kitty.

=== Episode 4 ===
Episode 4 recap Original airdate: 17 August 2003
Location: Nouméa, New Caledonia
Assignment	Money earned	Possible earnings
Cam's "Resurrection"	$50,000	$50,000
Parking Lot	$0	$10,000
Hostage Rescue	$0	$5,000
Culture Vultures	$5,000	$5,000
Predictions	-$2,000	$4,000
Current Kitty	$89,000	$298,000
Elimination
Josh	True 3rd player eliminated	

Cam's "Resurrection": The players' votes were revealed. Six of the players said they would not want Cam back, but for Kris, the money was too much, and she opted to bring Cam back. This was a surprise even to Cam, who thought he was being driven to the airport to fly home, but he was in fact driven to the site of the next assignment. The other players were not happy to have him returned, since several of them thought he was the Mole.

Parking Lot: After choosing four players who like to drive, the group was presented with an assignment to get a red car out of a walled parking lot, with 20 silver cars blocking the way. Each car could only move one direction, in lengths of the grid, and could not run into any other cars, meaning that they had to move the silver cars around to open up an alley for the red car to come through (it began lined up with the exit, though blocked in). There was a one-hour time limit, but Petrina found the solution within minutes, and $5,000 was easily won. The host then offered them double or nothing on a second puzzle, one that looked similar but was actually considerably harder (the first puzzle took nine moves to solve, the second would take seventeen), with 21 silver cars in the lot with the red car. They took the gamble, but failed, and as their hour ran out they won nothing in this assignment.

Hostage Rescue: Josh was taken hostage in the middle of the night and brought to the top of Amédée Lighthouse. The next morning, Cam, Kris, and Petrina were charged with rescuing him. They met the host in a second-floor room at their hotel and were told to ask Josh repeated yes/no questions to help discern his location. For every "yes" answer, they would get a small piece to a picture on a flatscreen in front of them that would show where Josh was. For every "no" answer, they would lose 2 minutes off their one-hour time limit. After some "yes" answers, the group of three figured out that Josh was in a lighthouse, and thought that would be enough information, so they ran down to the helipad and the chopper that was to take them to Josh's location. The pilot, however, informed them that there were numerous lighthouses in the area, so they ran back up to the host and asked some more questions. They again reached a point where they thought they had enough information, but again wound up running back up to the host. At this point, Cam figured out that all they needed were "yes" answers from Josh to get the picture showing his location – the questions didn't necessarily have to be about his location. After asking questions such as "Is the sun in the sky?" and "Is water wet?" they finally completed the picture and knew which lighthouse they had to go to. The assignment was not over, however, until all three of them reached the top where Josh was being held. With all the "no" answers they'd gotten from Josh and the time wasted running up and down the stairs at the hotel, precious little was left by the time they got to the lighthouse, and Kris was unable to climb the 249 stairs up to the top in time, missing out on the $5,000 the assignment was worth.

Culture Vultures: The host asked the four who weren't part of the Hostage Rescue to pick two "culture vultures." Nathan and Alison were sent to the Tjibaou Cultural Center, just outside Nouméa. There, they received a guided tour of the premises and took in a lot of New Caledonian culture, furiously scribbling notes on what they were told all along the way. At the end of their tour, they were indeed tested on what they'd been told, but for $5,000, their task was simply to recall their tour guide's name. They both immediately gave the correct answer, and the money was won.

Predictions: Shaun and Nikki secretly followed Nathan and Alison for an assignment of their own. They were to predict what the two of them would do in four pre-arranged situations. The first was when the car, en route to the cultural center, stopped at a corner store, two Girl Guides approached it and asked for a donation. Shaun and Nikki had to predict whether either player in the car would give a donation. They predicted no, but Nathan surprised them by in fact giving the girls a donation. The next situation was that someone had dropped a wallet, and Shaun and Nikki had to predict whether one of the other two would pick it up and hand it in. They predicted that one of the others would, and Nathan indeed picked up the wallet and handed it in. The third situation involved a passerby throwing an empty water bottle at a garbage can, but missing it. They predicated that one of the other players would pick up the water bottle and throw it away. Though Alison walked over to the bottle, she did not pick it up and in fact walked away from it, putting them down $1,000. The last situation saw a stranger come up to them and speak to them only in French, and Shaun and Nikki predicted that they'd speak at least some French to him in return, if only "Bonjour" or something otherwise extremely basic. They resulted in not even using that small amount of French, and the team finished $2,000 in the red for this assignment.

- At the elimination, after green screens appeared for Kris and Shaun, the screen turned red when Josh's name was typed in. Most of the players were shocked, with Cam remarking "You're kidding!" as Josh was escorted away from the group.

=== The Story so Far ===
On 23 August, one night before the fifth episode went to air, a half-hour episode was shown at 8:00pm recapping the first four episodes briefly. It revealed that Stace had suspected Josh as the Mole when she was eliminated in Episode One. The following day, from midday the first four episodes were replayed in their entireties, in what the Seven Network dubbed as a "Mole-a-thon". Episode Five then went to air the following night.

=== Episode 5 ===
Episode 5 recap Original airdate: 24 August 2003
Location: Nouméa, New Caledonia
Assignment	Money earned	Possible earnings
Island Escape	$0	$5,000
New Caledonian Whispers	$0	$6,000
Walk the Plank	$20,000	$35,000
Current Kitty	$109,000	$344,000
Free passes
—	Alison, Cam, Nikki, and Petrina all declined to pay $5,000 for a free pass	
Elimination
Petrina	Appeared to be the 4th player eliminated	

Island Escape: The players met up with the host on the beach, who revealed that their assignment was to build a raft out of a pile of junk on the beach and take it out to a rescue boat out in the water, where $5,000 awaited them. They had one hour to reach the boat, and they needed to use everything present on the beach and to get all of them to the rescue boat for the money to be won. Midway through the challenge, the host asked them who among them they thought was least helpful in building the raft. The players chose Kris, and she was given the opportunity to search for coins buried in the beach with a metal detector, and if she could accumulate 2,000 CFP Francs, she could rent a kayak and row out to the rescue boat and win the $5,000 that way. However, as she normally required reading glasses that she didn't have with her, she was unable to discern the values of what coins she was able to find and was unable to get enough money to rent the kayak. The raft eventually made it out to the rescue boat, but they finished 1 minute, 38 seconds outside the time limit and won nothing.

New Caledonian Whispers: Akin to Chinese whispers, this assignment saw Alison given a secret word, which she described in an SMS for Petrina and Kris, who then had to draw what they thought the word was using only geometric shapes, and then describe their drawing to Nathan and Nikki, who had to duplicate it as best they could and fax their drawing to Cam and Shaun, who would then guess the word. Each word, of three to be played, that was correctly guessed would win $2,000 for the kitty. There was a 15-minute time limit for each word. The first was "parachute." Kris and Petrina easily discerned this from Alison's SMS, and geometrically drew a parachute and described it to Nathan and Nikki. Nathan and Nikki sent their picture to Cam and Shaun, who thought it was a cat. The second word was "motorbike." Kris and Petrina again got it pretty easily from the SMS, but had to describe their drawing to Nathan and Nikki twice, and time ran out just as Cam and Shaun got their fax. They knew immediately that it was a motorbike. The last word was "helicopter." Again, Kris and Petrina knew it easily from the SMS. Their explanation to Nathan and Nikki again took a lot of time, but Cam and Shaun got the fax in time for the last round, guessing that it was a catamaran. Thus, no money was won in the assignment.

Walk the Plank: Upon meeting up a tall stack of industrial containers, the host pointed the players to wallets attached to a plank that extended from the top of the stack. There were some red wallets, and some green. The plank was twenty meters high, ten meters long, ten centimeters wide, and wobbled when someone walked on it. Each wallet was worth $5,000 for the group kitty. Whether a player had to retrieve the green wallet, closer to the stacks, or the red wallet, closer to the edge, was based on whether they answered a question from one of seven categories correctly or not. The only player to answer their question correctly was Petrina. The first one to attempt the plank walk was Nathan, who stumbled off the board. All those players after him who tried the plank (Shaun and Kris refused to even try) took a different technique than Nathan had – the first of them, Alison, grasped her safety wire tightly, which gave her more balance, and made it very easy to make it out to the red wallets.

After the assignment, the host offered the four players who had successfully retrieved a wallet the opportunity to earn a free pass through to the next episode, if they would pay $5,000 from the kitty (what they had just earned) to obtain it. All four players passed.

=== Episode 6 ===
Episode 6 recap Original airdate: 31 August 2003
Location: Nouméa, New Caledonia
Assignment	Money earned	Possible earnings
Petrina's "Resurrection"	-$50,000	$0
Waterfall Bags	$10,000	$20,000
Catch the Ball	-$10,000	$10,000
Pull the Plug	$2,000	$8,000
Current Kitty	$61,000	$372,000
Elimination
Nikki	True 4th player eliminated	

Petrina's "Resurrection": After being taken away after her elimination, Petrina was approached by the host with an offer – she could return to the game if she would reduce the group kitty by $50,000, and as Grant states it, "The price of Cam." She accepted this offer and was returned to the game. Cam was visibly upset because when he returned, nobody was happy to see him and $50,000 was added to the kitty. Yet when Petrina returned, everyone was happy to see her, despite $50,000 being removed from the kitty.

Waterfall Bags: Sixteen bags, staggered in four different drops, were thrown over a short waterfall. In each drop, one bag contained money, one contained essentials, one luxuries, and one accessories. The players were shown ahead of time which bag contained what when, but the signs for each drop mixed the colors and the words for the colors up, such as the first sign saying "Green bag $5,000 Blue bag luxury Red bag accessories Yellow bag essentials" In each drop, the players could retrieve only two bags, meaning they clearly should aim for the money and essential bags. They grabbed two money bags, winning $10,000.

Catch the Ball: The players were sent to an old, abandoned jail, early in the evening, for their next assignment. A large steel ball was held in place by electromagnets, which were in turn powered by three batteries. The batteries could fail at any moment – perhaps five minutes after the assignment began, perhaps five hours, perhaps even longer than that. If whoever was standing under the ball caught it when it fell, they'd double their winnings from the waterfall assignment, but if they let the ball fall, they'd lose those winnings. It was at this point revealed what the other bags from the waterfall assignment would get them. With one choice of the essentials, Petrina chose food over cooking gear, sleeping bags, and pillows. They got two bags labeled luxury items, and Alison chose alcohol and plush bedding over fancy food and chocolate. Lastly was the choice of accessories, as they got two bags with that label. Kris chose snack food and 'entertainment' (a guitar and some board games) over beach gear and common household items, as these choices were meant to be items that would be useless for a night in a jail. Nikki was then only allowed to take $10,000 of the $20,000 "Mole Bucks" in another cell. Cam and Nathan took most of the turns standing under the ball, with Shaun and the women each refusing to take more than a small number of early ones and sleeping through the rest of the assignment. The host returned to the players midway through the night and offered to call the assignment off, meaning they'd not risk losing their winnings from the waterfall, but the players chose to press on. The ball fell early the next morning, with Cam standing below it. He failed to catch it and the $10,000 was lost.

Pull the Plug: Before this assignment, the players were each given small steel canisters, and instructed that they must always have the canisters with them when asked, or face a $1,000 penalty from the kitty, and that they mustn't open them. After arriving at the pier, the players were told to split into two groups to paddle two leaky boats around a couple of buoys. They would be taking on water from the get-go, because the host removed a plug from each boat before they set off. Upon paddling back to the pier after going around one buoy, they had to answer a question, and if it was answered incorrectly, another plug would be taken out. For each time they made it back to the pier after two buoys without sinking, they'd win $2,000. There were two rounds for each boat, making a possible $8,000. Both boats failed in the first round, but the boat transporting Kris, Nathan, and Alison made it back safely in round two.

=== Episode 7 ===
Episode 7 recap Original airdate: 7 September 2003
Location: Nouméa, New Caledonia
Assignment	Money earned	Possible earnings
Banana Boats	$7,000	$10,000
Exemption Dinner	$0	$5,000
Underwater Charades	$0	$10,000
Arrest	-$2,000	$0
Current Kitty	$66,000	$397,000
Free passes
—	The group failed to come to a unanimous decision at the dinner table	
Nathan	Chosen by random draw among the players to prevent losing $5,000	
Elimination
Kris	5th player eliminated	

Banana Boats: The players were divided by sex and told to climb onto banana boats that were to be towed behind a powerboat. The challenge was for the men to move to the women's boat and the women to the men's without anyone falling in the water. There were three rounds, one at a very slow speed, worth $1,000 if successful, one at a medium speed with a shorter rope, worth $3,000 if successful, and one at a very fast speed with a shorter rope still, worth $6,000 if successful. Each round lasted ten minutes. The players easily won the first round, but ran out of time in the second, after the men's boat tipped over multiple times. The players won the last round with 2 seconds to spare, totaling $7,000 for this assignment.

Exemption Dinner: At dinner after the Banana Boats assignment, the host told the players they'd win $5,000 for the group kitty if they could, inside of five minutes, unanimously choose someone to receive a free pass through to the next episode. Alison suggested they draw straws, but Kris objected to Cam or Petrina being in the running, since they'd already gotten a second chance. Cam refused to agree to the four others of them alone drawing straws, but would draw if all six were included. Ultimately, they failed to come to a unanimous decision, won no money, and no free pass was awarded.

Underwater Charades: The group picked their two strongest swimmers, Cam and Nathan, and their two biggest movie buffs, Shaun and Petrina. Alison and Kris, the two unchosen, stayed with the host and had the assignment revealed to them – Cam and Nathan would be in snorkeling gear in the hotel's pool acting out the titles of television shows and films in which some character dies. Once Alison and Kris correctly guessed the charade, they'd radio the title to Shaun and Petrina, who were standing by in a mock cemetery and had to dig up the grave of the actor who portrayed the character that died in the particular film or TV show. Inside one of the six caskets that they were to retrieve was $10,000. Alison and Kris correctly guessed five charades – South Park, Crouching Tiger, Hidden Dragon, Titanic, What Lies Beneath, and Pearl Harbor (failing to guess American Beauty), but Shaun and Petrina only dug up four correct caskets, thinking Ben Affleck's character died in Pearl Harbor when it was in fact Josh Hartnett's that did. Upon uniting everyone at the graveyard, the host offered the players $5,000 to quit instead of searching the caskets for the $10,000. They refused. After finding nothing but prop mummies in the caskets for the first two caskets checked, the host then offered the players $1,000 to stop and not check the last two. They refused again, and neither of the last caskets had the money either – it was in Josh Hartnett's grave, the one that Shaun and Petrina failed to identify as a correct one.

Arrest: The players were told to drive to the beach for their next assignment. Before getting into the van, the host told them to pick someone by majority vote to get a free pass, or they'd lose $5,000 from the kitty. Since the other four could form a majority and overrule Cam and Petrina's objections to being excluded from the draw, they drew for the pass and Nathan was the winner.

Along the way, the van was pulled over by New Caledonian police. Since the players didn't have any identification on them, they were all arrested and hauled into a paddy wagon to be taken to a police station. Though none of them knew it, this was the assignment, and it was where the canisters they'd been given in the previous episode came into play. One by one, each of them was called away to be interviewed by the police lieutenant, who was in on the ruse, and were invited, but not ordered, to open their canisters. As had been stated when they'd received them, anyone who opened their canister would cost the group $1,000 from the kitty. Cam immediately opened his canister when the lieutenant mentioned it, but the other five all declined. What was inside the canisters was photographic paper that would turn black when developed. After the police took each of the six canisters, they were developed, and two of them, Cam's as well as Shaun's, turned black, costing the group $2,000 from the kitty. Shaun had opened his canister almost immediately after being given it, saying when he's told not to do something, he immediately wants to do it.

This assignment also brought about a major plot point in the season – when returning to the paddy wagon after being interviewed, Shaun found a note that was seemingly a communication between the show's producers and the Mole. It indicated that Alison and Petrina were both correctly identifying the Mole in the quiz. Shaun considered recusing himself from the game, thinking that if the note were genuine, he'd have been given an unfair advantage over the other players.

=== Episode 8 ===
Episode 8 recap Original airdate: 14 September 2003
Location: Nouméa, New Caledonia
Assignment	Money earned	Possible earnings
Dam Treasure Hunt	$7,000	$10,000
Relative Parachute	$10,000	$50,000
Beach Questions	$0	$8,000
Current Kitty	$83,000	$465,000
Elimination
Alison	6th player eliminated	

Dam Treasure Hunt: The players met up at a dam and were instructed to abseil down its face to retrieve, one each, five black cases that contained memory chips which, when plugged into their iPAQ, would reveal photos, which were clues to finding $10,000 hidden on the site. There was a one-hour time limit for the entire assignment. Nathan and Cam successfully retrieved cases, and, once on the dam floor, were able to swing Alison over to one. They tried to do the same with Petrina, but she was unable to grab a case. Shaun easily grabbed a case on his abseil. The players were then allowed to buy the fifth chip, for $3,000, and did so, despite the fact that it gave them no additional information (it showed them a room that was accessed by a ladder that one of their other chips already showed). The other photos showed a hallway, a lock against a solid door, and a marking on a wall. The hallway was at the top of the dam, where they'd eventually find the money, but in climbing back up, Nathan was certain he passed the door depicted with the lock in that photo, and when they found the key next to the marking on the wall, he bolted down several flights of stairs to the door he thought was the one depicted in the picture. Eventually, he returned to the top of the dam, with very little time to spare, and the players eventually found all the locations the photo clues were to send them to. The money wasn't won until someone actually found it in the room where it was stashed, under the cover on a plinth. Nathan found the money with only seconds left in their time limit.

Relative Parachute: At dinner after the dam assignment, the host played a recording of various friends and family members of the players in an airplane, and asked them to predict whether they'd tandem parachute jump (just as all of them but Shaun had earlier in the season) or not. Each correct prediction won $10,000 for the group kitty, while each incorrect prediction took $10,000 away. The men all got their predictions right, but the women were both wrong, putting the group $10,000 ahead for the assignment. After the assignment, the players were reunited with their friends and family through breakfast the next day.

Beach Questions: As the only one who had not yet been up in an aircraft in New Caledonia, Alison was singled out for this assignment. She was to fly in a restored World War II fighter plane and observe planks the others laid out on the beach, which would show answers to questions the host asked. She would then have to match the answers she had to the original questions. Each question correctly answered by Alison was worth $2,000 for the kitty, but she never stood a chance because the other four answered every question wrong in the first place.

=== Episode 9 ===
Episode 9 recap Original airdate: 21 September 2003 (Adelaide and Perth) 25 September 2003 (Sydney, Melbourne and Brisbane)
Location: Nouméa, New Caledonia
Assignment	Money earned	Possible earnings
Two Questions	$0	$11,000
Sports Champions	$0	$20,000
Exemption Game	$0	$5,000
Current Kitty	$83,000	$501,000
Free passes
Shaun	Awarded after Nathan was determined to have cheated in the Exemption Game	
Elimination
Cam	7th player eliminated	

Two Questions: The players boarded a cruise ship, and one at a time answered two morality questions and were put into a particular cabin on the ship. The other three players were charged with finding the fourth, based on the answers they gave to the questions. If they thought the other player answered one way to the first question, they'd go to the left from their starting position, and if they thought the other player answered the other way, they'd go to the right. From then, if they thought the other player answered one way to the second question, they'd knock on the door to the left, and right for the other. The first three rounds were worth $2,000 if the player was successfully found, but none of them were, with each giving a surprising answer to one of their questions – Nathan said he would strip nude for a bachelorette party for $250, Cam said he would not help out a stranger being assaulted, Shaun said he would sleep with his best friend's girlfriend, and Petrina said she would date a married man. For the last round, seeking Petrina, the prize was upped to $5,000.

Sports Champions: The players were presented in their van with the pictures of four New Caledonian sports champions, and told that one was a champion of windsurfing, one of outrigger canoeing, one of pétanque, and one of cricket. They were to each choose a person and a sport to play. Each victory by a contestant would win $5,000 for the group kitty. Nathan's canoe tipped over in the middle of his race, and he was easily defeated by the windsurfing champion. Petrina lost at pétanque to the canoeing champion. Cam, who fell into the water three times during his race, lost at windsurfing to the pétanque champion. Shaun had been matched up with a woman to play cricket (he had to face eighteen deliveries from a bowler without being bowled), and the contestants were the surest of her not playing her chosen sport. Though none of the contestants knew it, cricket is a game typically played by women in New Caledonia. Oddly, though the only one matched up with the champion in their chosen sport, Shaun put up the most competitive effort, and was defeated only narrowly. He was bowled on the seventeenth ball, after the sixteenth had struck him in the groin.

Exemption Game: The players were taken, blindfolded, to an undisclosed location. They were split into pairs (Cam and Nathan, and Shaun and Petrina) to play a math puzzle, with the pair solving it in the quicker time advancing to potentially play for a free pass through to the final round. Shaun and Petrina won this first round, and the two of them advanced to a second round where they had to answer a series of ten analogy questions. The faster there would play for the free pass, and that was Shaun. The other three were taken, still blindfolded, a kilometer away and told to find Shaun in order to stop him from winning the free pass and add $5,000 to the kitty. Shaun was back at their starting location playing a memory game with oversized cards. If he completed the game, he'd win the free pass. Nathan found the building Shaun was in within minutes and stopped him before he finished the memory game, and it seemed that the $5,000 was won. But the next day, after the computer test had been taken, and just before the elimination started, the host revealed that there was evidence that Nathan had cheated – a clip was shown of Nathan in the van slightly raising his blindfold and leaning his head back to see underneath it. Though Nathan vigorously denied cheating, the $5,000 was revoked and Shaun was awarded the free pass.

Final Four: During the confession, Cam revealed that he suspected Petrina as the mole after she came back. However, he changed his mind and he picked Shaun as the mole in the final four quiz. If Shaun did not get the exemption, he would be eliminated or if Cam did not change his mind at the final four quiz, Nathan would be eliminated. It was true that Cam scored the highest in the final five quiz.

Nathan's name was typed in first, and the green screen appeared, relieving him. Cam's name was typed in second, and the screen turned red.

=== Episode 10 ===
Episode 10 recap Original airdate: 28 September 2003
Location: Nouméa, New Caledonia Isle of Pines, New Caledonia
Assignment	Money earned	Possible earnings
Helicopter Jigsaw	$12,000	$20,000
The Rhyming Slang Challenge	$9,000	$10,000
Final Kitty	$104,000	$531,000
The reveal
Nathan	The Runner-Up	
Shaun	The winner of $104,000	
Petrina	The Mole	

Helicopter Jigsaw: The host called the players at their breakfast table and told them to find him, for $20,000 that would be reduced by $1 for each second that passed until they found him. The first clue was the island in the middle of the hotel's swimming pool, which contained pieces to a jigsaw puzzle. It instructed them to head to the Amédée Lighthouse (where Josh was held hostage in the fourth episode) for the remaining pieces to the puzzle. The pieces they found there directed them to a coral atoll, where they found crosshairs that at last directed them to the Isle of Pines and the host. It took them 8,650 seconds to find the host, and that was rounded up to $12,000 winnings for this assignment.

The Rhyming Slang Challenge: The players met the host on a patio by a garden at their hotel for their last assignment. Inside a safe next to him was $10,000, and the players had 20 minutes to discover the 4-digit combination that would open the safe. They were given a series of clues, each one in rhyming slang, and could purchase additional clues for $1,000 apiece. The numbers of the combination could only be seen with an ultraviolet light, which was on a table in the middle of the garden. Their first clue told them to lie on a pair of hammocks to turn on the light. They were unable to fully solve this without buying an additional clue that told them that the light would only turn on if two of them were lying in the hammocks and one looking at the table. The table had their first number, a 3. The next clue indicated that their next number was on the back of their coveralls, and Petrina found a 6 on hers. Their next clue led them to the nearby bowls court, but the number wasn't actually on a ball or the jack, it was on a coconut. It bore the number 5. The last clue directed them to grab the queen off a chessboard in one of the rooms, and it bore another 6. Their last clue directed them to the swimming pool to find four small bottles that would give them the correct order for the numbers. The bottles bore out the word MOLE, and when converted by telephone code, it gave the correct combination of 6653. They finished with a little over a minute left and won $9,000.

After this assignment, the players were put into three locked cabins to take the final computer test. Shaun was revealed as the winner of $104,000, and Petrina as the Mole. Shaun was lucky to have even won the game at all, having scored equal lowest in the second elimination but having a faster time, and also escaping elimination in the previous episode after Nathan had cheated in the Exemption Game. Had Shaun not won that exemption, Shaun would have been eliminated rather than Cam and the outcome of the game would have been totally different.

== Mole Activity ==
=== Sabotage ===
Petrina was revealed to have sabotaged nearly every assignment with which she was involved.

The following acts of sabotage were revealed in the final episode:

Arrival Game: Petrina thought Shaun would be least likely to know the Melbourne GPO Postal Code offhand, so she purposely gave him the wrong answer and they were unable to open their safe, costing $1,000.

Parachute Safe: Petrina intentionally entered the wrong combination into her safe.

Dam Relay Race: Petrina needlessly exerted herself before going on the high wire, taking quick sharp breaths that spiked her heart rate.

Photography: Though Cam took all the pictures, it was Petrina who handed the memory chip to the host for evaluation, and this sabotage cost the kitty over $10,000. She had been carrying a blank memory chip with her the entire day, and noted how the risk of this gambit was magnified when part of the assignment involved Cam having to wear her clothes.

Parking Lot: Petrina was instructed to quickly solve the easier car puzzle, to goad the others into taking the much harder one and gamble away their $5,000 winnings.

Hostage Rescue: Petrina knew that Josh was being held in a lighthouse, and that there were numerous lighthouses in the area. She convinced Cam and Kris to leave for the helipad twice when she knew they didn't have enough information to get to Josh. This cost the group $5,000, but Petrina very nearly gave the game away, because she had a note of instructions from show's producers tucked under the short denim skirt she was wearing that day, and in all the running around it nearly came loose.

Pull the Plug: Petrina purposely removed plugs from her own boat.

Relative Parachute: Petrina knew that her dad would jump out of the plane, but predicted against that, and cost the kitty another $10,000.

Dam Treasure Hunt: Petrina intentionally missed her memory chip while abseiling, which cost the group $3,000.

Sports Champions: Petrina knew that the woman was the champion cricketer, and encouraged challenging her in that sport.

Helicopter Jigsaw: Even in the very last episode, Petrina wasted time, and by extension dollars, by sitting on jigsaw pieces after they retrieved them from the hotel swimming pool. This sabotage was cut short, as Shaun caught her in the act. This is one sabotage Shaun is believed to have picked up on.

The Rhyming Slang Challenge: The only way to see the bottles in the swimming pool was when the surface of the water was unbroken, and Petrina immediately jumped in the water and caused ripples that made it impossible to see, from above, where the bottles were.

The following acts of sabotage were spotted during the series, but not mentioned in the final episode:

Underwater: Petrina was seen to accept duplicate pieces that Nikki found underwater, costing five minutes of time.

Underwater Charades: Petrina insisted on digging up the wrong graves of several actors, losing $10,000.

Two Questions: Petrina gave strange answers to the questions that Cam, Nathan and Shaun were to answer, costing $5,000.

=== Clues ===
The following clues were revealed in the final episode:

Petrina's Combination: The number given to Petrina as she jumped from the airplane was 5636, an anagram of 6653 which was shown twice, in the very first assignment of the season and the very last, to be telephone code for MOLE.

Petrina's Elimination: This was planned all along and was not an improvised trick to try to get people to not suspect her – in fact, no one selected Petrina as the Mole on the quiz until after she was eliminated and returned.

The Note That Shaun Found: Shaun eventually figured out that the note was a fake, and based on the fact that only Kris and Petrina had been in the paddy wagon on the side where Shaun found it, and Kris was subsequently eliminated that episode, it had to be a fake.
