= The Mole (Australian TV series) season 3 =

The Mole
- Season 3
- No. of episodes: 11, including a crossover episode with The Weakest Link

Release
- Original network: Seven Network
- Original release: 20 February – 24 April 2002

Season chronology
- ← Previous; Season 2 Next → Season 4

The third season of the Australian version of The Mole took place mostly in Gold Coast, Queensland and was hosted by Grant Bowler.

== Details ==
This season was similar to the previous Australian seasons of The Mole. A twist introduced this season is that not all assignments are assessed on a pass/fail scheme. In previous seasons a $10,000 assignment resulted in the team adding $10,000 to the pot, or failing, and adding none. In this season depending on the level of the team's success, they may win a portion of the prize, i.e. $4,000. It had an announced maximum prize to be won of $300,000, with the absolute maximum considerably more than that. The main difference was that it had a larger cast, twelve players rather than ten, and as such, two additional rounds of play. A notable and unique assignment in this season occurred during the fourth round of gameplay, and involved the players being blindfolded and taken to the set of The Weakest Link, with all money won added to the group kitty and the winner of the game given a free pass through to the next round. Filming took place throughout January and February in 2002, including the Weakest Link special episode. This season coincided with the Nine's 2002 edition of Australian Survivor (which aired an hour later on Nine) and produced poor ratings, leading to rumours the show would be cancelled.

=== Contestants ===
Due to the series being based on the Gold Coast, no contestants from Queensland were considered. Instead, contestants from New South Wales (seven), South Australia (one) and Victoria (four) were picked. At the time of the airing of this season, seven contestants were under the age of 30, making this group one of the youngest groups on the Australian version of The Mole. These are the twelve contestants who were on the show:

Player	Age	Hometown	Occupation	Outcome
Janet Kesby	45	Balgownie, New South Wales	Makeup Artist	11th Place
John Binning	72	Victoria	Retired Businessman	10th Place
Yasmin Dunn	19	New South Wales	World-class Swimmer	9th Place
Thao Nguyen	21	Bankstown, New South Wales	Law Student	8th Place
Joe Ballota	26	St. Albans, Victoria	Bodybuilder	7th Place
Pete Moore	22	St Ives, New South Wales	Bodyboarder	6th Place
David Annand	33	Castlemaine, Victoria	Stonemason	5th Place
Ann-Maree Weaver†	62	Petersham, New South Wales	Real Estate Agent	4th Place
Robert "Bob" Young VII	37	Glendenning, New South Wales	Truck Driver	3rd Place
Marc Jongebloed	25	Toorak, Victoria	Lawyer	Runner-up
Alaina Taylor	21	Cherrybrook, New South Wales	Insurance Adviser	The Mole
Crystal-Rose "Crystal" Cluff	21	Blaxland, New South Wales	Model	Winner

† Ann-Maree Weaver died on 6 January 2013 aged 72.

=== Elimination Chart ===
Elimination Chart
Player	1	2	3	4	5	6	7	8	9	10
Crystal-Rose	IN	IN	IN	IN	IN	IN	IN	IN	IN	WINNER
Alaina	IN	IN	IN	IN	IN	IN	IN	IN	IN	MOLE
Marc	IN	IN	IN	IN	IN	IN	IN	IN	IN	RUNNER-UP
Bob	IN	IN	IN	IN	IN	IN	IN	IN	OUT	
Ann-Maree	IN	IN	IN	IN	IN	IN	IN	OUT		
David	IN	IN	IN	IN	IN	IN	OUT			
Pete	IN	IN	IN	IN	IN	OUT				
Joe	IN	IN	IN	IN	OUT					
Thao	IN	IN	IN	OUT						
Yasmin	IN	IN	OUT							
John	IN	OUT								
Janet	OUT									

Indicates the player won the game
Indicates the player was the mole
Indicates the player won a free pass
Indicates the player won an exemption, but either gave it back for money or lost it in a later assignment
Indicates the player scored the lowest on the quiz and was eliminated

== Episodes ==
=== Episode 1 ===
Episode 1 recap
Location: Sydney, New South Wales Gwydir River, northern New South Wales
Assignment	Money earned	Possible earnings
Rescue Jump	$10,000	$10,000
Luggage Repack	$9,000	$10,000
Whitewater Rafting	$2,000	$10,000
Current Kitty	$21,000	$30,000
Elimination
Janet	1st player eliminated	

Rescue Jump: After meeting for the first time on board a large boat, the players were told to don wetsuits and prepare for their first assignment, for $10,000, which was to board a helicopter and simulate a rescue jump into the ocean, from 10 meters in height. The players went up in the helicopter in pairs, and although a few of them were frightened, particularly Thao, all of them jumped and the money was won.

Luggage Repack: Immediately after the Rescue Jump, the players were told to prepare to take a plan to trip to Gold Coast. They first had to lighten the amount of luggage they were taking on board with them, and were told that the men had a room to change and unpack luggage and the women the same. What they were not immediately told was that the men were unpacking the women's bags and the women the men's. Each kilogram that they unpacked from the bags was worth $100 for the kitty. Some of the items that were discarded became important as the season went forward, such as Thao's Elmo doll and Joe's bodybuilding food. The men removed 40 kilos from the women's bags, and the women removed 44 kilos from the men's. This was rounded up to $9,000 total winnings.

Whitewater Rafting: The players were taken to the Gwydir River, made more turbulent by releasing water from the Copeton Dam, and told to raft a 1 kilometer section of the river, for $10,000. If all of them, put into three groups of four, remained in their rafts after a kilometer, $10,000 would be won, but for each person who fell out, $2,000 would be lost. Each raft had a guide, but it was up to the contestants to provide the rowing power and most of the steering. Before the assignment properly started, the host offered to allow anyone, even the entire group, to back out and not risk losing $2,000 for falling out of the raft. They all decided to press on. The first two rafts made it to the halfway point, but the one transporting Crystal-Rose, Janet, Joe, and John tipped over after moments, putting all of them in the water and instantly losing $8,000. At the halfway point, the host then offered the eight remaining rafters another opportunity to bail out, but they again declined. Both boats made it to the finish, and $2,000 was won.

- At the elimination, most of the contestants expressed their fear and disdain about the first elimination, and that they would not want to be the first eliminated. Bob said he did not want any of the male contestants to be eliminated first. Thao was visibly upset before the elimination began as she hoped not to be the first contestant eliminated. After green screens appeared for Bob, Thao, Crystal-Rose, Marc, Ann-Maree and Yasmin, the screen turned red when Janet's name was typed in. Everyone was shocked, whilst Ann-Maree was audibly upset. Janet thought Marc was the Mole.

=== Episode 2 ===
Episode 2 recap
Location: Gold Coast, Queensland
Assignment	Money earned	Possible earnings
Campout	$1,000	$6,000
Snipers	$5,000	$8,000
Trap Shooting	$4,000	$25,000
Current Kitty	$31,000	$69,000
Free Passes
—	Alaina, Pete, and Yasmin were all shot during the sniper assignment	
Elimination
John	2nd player eliminated	

Campout: The players met up with the host at the foot of a small hill. They were told to split into three groups and walk up the hill to the top, where they'd be camping that night. Along the way, they'd find two locations with everything they needed for the night. The players at first thought this sounded suspiciously simple to be a money-winning assignment, but found that at each location there was a choice - take $1,000 for the kitty, or some camping gear. Collectively, they took $2,000 (in form of two pieces of paper with the amount printed on them) and four large duffel bags containing gear, but their inability to contact one another wound up giving them the nearly useless combination of having a tent, but no tent poles or pegs. Midway through the night, the host brought the two bags they'd left behind and offered to give them to the players for $2,000 taken from the kitty, but they immediately declined. He then asked for the two $1,000 vouchers, but only one could be produced, so only $1,000 was added to the kitty. The players, particularly Bob, were livid that the Mole was seemingly able to strike right under their noses.

Snipers: After being selected as the three with the best night vision, Alaina, Pete, and Yasmin were taken to an old, abandoned shopping mall. They were given laser guns with which to shoot their teammates, radios to keep in contact with one another, and some pointers from a professional armorer. The others were also given laser guns upon arriving at the shopping center, and told that their task was to shoot the three snipers. For each player from the group of eight that was shot during thirty minutes, $1,000 would be added to the kitty, but if Alaina, Pete, or Yasmin survived the assignment without being shot themselves, they'd earn a free pass through to the next episode. Once the assignment properly started, all the lights in the shopping mall were turned off. Alaina and Yasmin acted only in the interests of their own survival, not shooting anyone or even appearing to try. Pete eliminated Ann-Maree, John, Marc, Crystal-Rose, and Thao before Joe in turn eliminated him. Alaina and Yasmin tried to hole up in an old cinema, but wound up triggering their own alarm wire. They were eliminated by Bob and David with only 30 seconds remaining in the time limit, so $5,000 was won and no one got a free pass.

Trap Shooting: At breakfast the next day, each player received an envelope. Five of them had targets printed on them, meaning those five people would spend the day shooting clay pigeons. They were trained by Olympic champion trap shooter Michael Diamond. The very slight-framed Thao was among the shooters, and she had problems simply lifting the gun, let alone firing it. Yasmin was then separated from the other six and told to, one at a time, match them with a quiz question from a presented category. The player who answered the question then selected a shooter, who took aim at five clay targets, each worth $1,000. Crystal-Rose answered her question correctly, and on her behalf Pete hit three targets, winning $3,000. Joe then shot on behalf of Bob, but missed all five targets. Bob missed his question, so no money was possible in the first place in this round. Ann-Maree selected David to shoot for her, and he hit three targets. Ann-Maree's answer, however, was wrong. Alaina then got her question right and picked John to shoot for her, who hit one target. The last shooter was Thao, who miraculously hit two targets, but Marc got his question wrong, so the money was not won.

- At the elimination, the two snipers' names were first typed into the computer, Yasmin and Pete namely, and the green screen appeared for both of them. Following further green screens for Joe, David and Ann-Maree, the screen turned red when John's name was typed in. Most of the players, visibly Thao, were upset to see him leave. He was described by Pete as "a legend" and David as "the fittest 72–73-year-old bloke that he has ever met". John thought that Pete was the Mole.

=== Episode 3 ===
Episode 3 recap
Location: Gold Coast, Queensland
Assignment	Money earned	Possible earnings
Gold Coast Shopping Spree	$0	$10,000
Toughness	$0	$5,000
Minefield	$1,000	$8,000
Luggage Reclaim	-$4,000	$0
Current Kitty	$28,000	$92,000
Free Passes
Joe	Earned by fooling the others into stopping in the Toughness assignment	
Elimination
Yasmin	3rd player eliminated	

Gold Coast Shopping Spree: After being selected as the player who most likes to shop, Yasmin was sent away to a spa for a day of rest and relaxation. The others were split into three groups of three and told to shop for a house, a car, and a boat that they thought Yasmin would like. Each was given five choices, of varying price. They had to stay in contact with one another and stay within an imaginary two million dollar budget. The boat and house teams quickly made choices that they thought were what Yasmin would most want. The car team of Alaina, Crystal-Rose, and Joe had some disagreement as to whether Yasmin would rather go for a Lamborghini Diablo or a Bentley Arnage. They chose the Lamborghini, and although the boat team of Bob, Marc, and David were out of contact for a time during the assignment, they stayed within the budget. Yasmin was then presented with profiles of each car, boat, and house that the other nine had to choose from, and if her choices matched theirs, $10,000 would be won. Yasmin picked the same boat and house, but opted for the Bentley Arnage instead of the Lamborghini Diablo (stating she told Alaina how much she liked old cars), so no money was won.

Toughness: Joe was selected by the group as the one who thinks he's the toughest. He was taken to a separate location and strapped to what was purportedly an electric chair, one that would put an increasing electric current through his body. The others would come later, and be presented with twenty questions. If they answered all twenty questions, rightly or wrongly, they would win $5,000 for the group kitty. Each time they answered wrongly, the host would call to the person working the chair to administer a higher voltage to Joe. The catch was that Joe was never actually in any pain, and never received even the slightest electric current. The man running the chair, a professional acting coach, gave him a brief lesson on how to appear to be suffering excruciating pain. Joe's task, with a free pass through to the next episode as his prize, was to put on a performance convincing enough that the other nine players would stop answering questions so he would not have to endure any further voltage. They were able up close to see him on a closed circuit television monitor. The other players indeed stopped in the interest of Joe's well-being, after ten questions and only two answered correctly, so no money was won and Joe got his free pass.

Minefield: A minefield was set up on a beach (metal plates rigged to set off a small explosion were covered with sand). After choosing Bob and Crystal-Rose as the two players with whom the group would entrust their safety, the two of them were given three minutes with a metal detector and a markerboard to find the mines and create a map for their teammates. This map, and guesswork based on those who went before, were the only tools the other eight players would have as they tried to traverse the minefield. They were only allowed to look at the map for one minute. Each player to make it from one end to the other without getting blown up would win $1,000 for the kitty. Only Yasmin succeeded, as the players before her triggered several explosions from squares that had been left blank on Bob and Crystal-Rose's map.

Luggage Reclaim: The players were presented with the opportunity to spend $1,000 from the group kitty to reclaim the luggage they had lost in the first episode of the season. Alaina, Joe, Pete and Thao all took the offer, reducing the kitty by $4,000. The other players were upset to hear the trivial things they sacrificed money from the kitty to reclaim - Alaina wanted matching outfits, Joe wanted his bodybuilding protein food back, Pete wanted the speakers to go with his walkman even though he had a headset, and Thao was desperate to have her stuffed Elmo doll returned to her.

- Before the elimination, David wanted Crystal-Rose to be sent home and Crystal Rose wanted to see David get eliminated while Ann-Maree wanted to see either Alaina or Thao leave and Bob stated that he was tired of all of the young people saying that they were tired all of the time and wanted to see someone in that age group go home. At the elimination, after green screens appeared for Crystal Rose, Ann-Maree, David and Bob, the screen turned red when Yasmin's name was typed in, leaving the other players upset to see her leave. It was unknown who she thought who the Mole was.

=== Weakest Link Special Episode ===
==== The Votes ====
	Main Rounds								Final Round
Round:	1	2	3	4	5	6	7	8	Final
Voted Out:	Joe; 8/9 Votes	Alaina; 5/8 Votes	Pete; 5/7 Votes	Crystal-Rose; 2/6 Votes	Ann-Maree; 3/5 Votes	David; 2/4 Votes	Marc; 2/3 Votes	–	Bob (Winner); Thao (Runner-up)
Money Banked:	$3,200	$3,000	$500	$1,500	$3,200	$1,000	$200	$500 × 3	$14,100; TOTAL
Contestant	Votes								
Bob	Joe	Pete	Crystal-Rose	Thao	Thao	Marc	Marc	Won	
Thao	Joe	David	Pete	Crystal-Rose	Ann-Maree	David	Marc	Lost	
Marc	Joe	Alaina	Pete	Ann-Maree	Ann-Maree	David	Thao		
David	Joe	Alaina	Pete	Crystal-Rose	Ann-Maree	Thao			
Ann-Maree	Joe	Alaina	Pete	David	Marc				
Crystal-Rose	Joe	Alaina	Pete	Bob					
Pete	Joe	Alaina	Thao						
Alaina	Joe	David							
Joe	Alaina								

- Note that the following are regarding the contestant, not the contestant the contestant votes against:

Red indicates the contestant was the weakest link
Lime indicates the contestant was the strongest link

Joe was first eliminated for not answering any questions correctly. Alaina was next for not banking at a crucial moment and getting the question wrong. Pete followed for annoying everyone. Crystal-Rose was voted out for not answering enough questions correctly. Ann-Maree was eliminated for banking too early. David was next for taking too long to answer a question (although he did get it correct). Marc was voted out for being too big a threat (to Bob), and for stumbling on questions (to Thao). In the end, Bob defeated Thao in the Head-to-Head round. For winning, Bob received a free pass. However, Cornelia Frances left it a cliffhanger by saying "Or have you?"

The final total won was $14,100, the lowest total ever in the Australian version of The Weakest Link. This episode was watched by a national audience of 1.312 million, however, Who Wants to Be a Millionaire?, aired one hour later on the same night, achieved a national audience of 1.51 million.

=== Episode 4 ===
Episode 4 recap
Location: Seven Network studio, Melbourne, Victoria Gold Coast, Queensland
Assignment	Money earned	Possible earnings
The Weakest Link/Cheating Test	$15,000	$100,000
Charity	$5,000	$5,000
Luggage Drop	-$5,000	$5,000
Current Kitty	$43,000	$202,000
Free Passes
Bob	Earned by winning The Weakest Link	
Elimination
Thao	4th player eliminated	

Cheating Test: In the waiting room of the Weakest Link studio, the room was bugged with hidden microphones and cameras – the contestants were sent to the waiting room after the third and sixth rounds of game play. A production folder was deliberately left on a table with the answers to all the Weakest Link questions on the back. If the players look at the Q and A section, and gave the information to a player still in the game, they would be caught cheating and the prize money won and the free pass would be taken away. Many people looked at and picked up the folder, and Marc (who was at the time still in the game) saw the tab labeled "questions and answers," but it was determined that they did not attempt to pass any unfair advantage on to players still in the game, so the money and the free pass both stood. The host rounded the total up to $15,000.

Charity: The players were split into three groups of three and told that their assignment was to raise $300 for charity. One group would raise money drawing caricatures, one doing massages, and the other performing as statues. They each received some training appropriate to their tasks, and were given one-hour to, among them, collect the $300. They were sent to three different shopping malls. Thao proved to be extremely skilled at cartooning, pulling in the most money of anyone individually, whilst Crystal-Rose pulled out of her challenge after appearing to suffer from heat exhaustion. In the end, the massage team of Ann-Maree, Bob, and Joe made $109.55, the cartoonists Alaina, Marc, and Thao had $102.25, and the statues Crystal-Rose, David, and Pete made $96.60 (all in change), meaning the challenge was won.

Luggage Drop: Bob, Joe, Marc, and Thao went up in an airplane with everyone's luggage, including the items that certain people had paid $1,000 from the kitty to reclaim just days before. They dropped it at a specific location, and had to rely upon the other five to find it in time. The only help they could give them was an SMS, and it had to be of a 160-character limit, meaning words had to be truncated. If the luggage was found within three hours, $5,000 would be won, but if not, everyone would lose their luggage. The group of five was also taken on a meaningless tour of some Gold Coast canals, that were meant to look much the same as all the others and get them lost. The group of four dropped the luggage a kilometer away from the Hinze Dam. The SMS they sent said "NTH WEST FROM BRLH HEADS DAM PAST DAM ENTRANCE RESORT PAST HORSE STUD CLEARING NEAR RST LOOK FOR GREEN ROOF AT ENTRANCE NEAR RST" It should have taken the players in the boat just five minutes to make their way back to their cars, but they got lost and it took them almost an hour. They also misinterpreted directions given to them by someone in a convenience store, and headed in entirely the wrong direction. Though the group of five was confident they'd found the right place, the assignment was failed. Upon the reuniting all nine players at the hotel, the host offered to return the players their bags if they'd pay $5,000 from the group kitty. They agreed, on majority vote, to do this.

- At the elimination, both Marc and Thao preferred Ann-Maree to be eliminated whilst Marc also preferred Thao to be eliminated. Even Ann-Maree said that she thought she would not survive the elimination, with tensions rising when Bob called for calm from her. After green screens came up for David, Crystal-Rose and Ann-Maree, the screen turned red when Thao's name was typed in. She thought that either Bob or Pete was the Mole.

=== Episode 5 ===
Episode 5 recap
Location: Gold Coast, Queensland
Assignment	Money earned	Possible earnings
Baby Treasure Hunt	$6,000	$8,000
Surveillance	$0	$5,000
Murder Game	$0	$5,000
Bungee Jumping	$3,000	$8,000
Relative Bungee	$0	$8,000
Current Kitty	$52,000	$236,000
Free Passes
Alaina	Earned by identifying Bob as the murderer in the Murder Game	
Elimination
Joe	5th player eliminated	

Baby Treasure Hunt: Bob, David, Marc, and Pete volunteered to go on a treasure hunt. Bob and Pete were given a camera and a vehicle, and David and Marc got a map with various points in Gold Coast marked on it, to give directions to the other two. They were told that what they were to photograph would be obvious. What they found were baby pictures and home videos of the eight remaining players in the game. Upon returning to the hotel, they were charged with identifying the person in each photo they'd taken, and each correct answer would be worth $1,000 for the group kitty. They took six photos and correctly identified each of them, missing only Alaina's and Crystal-Rose's.

Surveillance: At the same time as the other four were doing the treasure hunt, Alaina, Ann-Maree, Crystal-Rose, and Joe were given the task of following them. They were to tail them as closely as possible without being seen. If they went the whole day without Bob or Pete seeing them, and were able to identify what their task was, they would win $5,000 for the kitty. This assignment was completed, as they were easily able to discern the task given to the others, who were never aware that they were being followed. However, the $5,000 was revoked because Alaina broke a law during the assignment - she spoke on a mobile phone while driving.

Murder Game: After being chosen as the group's most observant player, Alaina was isolated from the other seven players, who were treated to a ride on a fancy cruiser for a day of rest and relaxation, and a black-tie dinner. The host informed them at that dinner that one of them was to be the victim of a faux murder later in the evening, and one of the others was to commit the deed. The roles were selected at random. Alaina's task would be to figure out who the murderer was. She got some training from a detective. If she was successful, she'd win a free pass through to the next episode, and if she was not, the group would win $5,000. The victim ended up being Ann-Maree, who was placed in a realistic-looking crime scene in the boat's engine room. One at a time, the other six all went down to the room and came back up, with the murderer "killing" Ann-Maree when he went down - only the murderer himself knew his role, and the other six thus thought that this was the perfect crime. When Alaina was brought on board the next morning, she was permitted ten questions to any of the other six players. The murderer was permitted to lie, but the innocent players all had to tell the truth. After asking six questions and making no progress, Alaina offered to toss a coin for the free pass if the murderer would give himself up. In her last question, when she asked this of Bob, he replied, "No, I want the money," which indicated that he had the power to make that decision. An innocent player would be unallowed to make this choice, since he could not lie and say he was the murderer. Thus, Alaina knew Bob was the murderer, won a free pass and denied the group any money.

Bungee Jumping: The eight players were given the opportunity to bungee jump off a tall crane. Each one of them that jumped would win $500 for the kitty, and if all of them jumped, the prize would be doubled, for a potential total of $8,000. The men all jumped, but of the women, only Alaina would go through with it, meaning only $3,000 was won.

Relative Bungee: The players were then taken to a flatscreen monitor that showed the bungee crane and asked to bet on the likelihood of other people, later revealed to be family members of each of them, going through with the jump. Each correct prediction earned $1,000 for the kitty, and each incorrect prediction took $1,000 away. Crystal-Rose predicted her brother would jump, and he did. Joe predicted the same for his sister, but she did not jump. David thought his mother would jump, but she did not. Pete was confident his sister would jump, and she did. Alaina predicted that her mother would jump, but she did not. Marc predicted that his mother would not jump, and she indeed did not. Bob predicted that his wife would back out, and she did. The only relative the show could find for Ann-Maree was her 82-year-old father, so he was not asked to jump. Instead, a young friend of hers was put on the crane. She predicted he would jump, but he did not. With four correct and four incorrect predictions, the assignment was a push. The players were then allowed some time with their relatives.

- During the computer quiz, Joe said that Alaina was a prime suspect to be the Mole, but had stuck with his initial gut instincts from the beginning, David and Marc. After green screens came up for David and Crystal-Rose, the screen turned red when Joe's name was typed in. He thought that one of those two aforementioned contestants (David and Marc) was the Mole.

=== Episode 6 ===
Episode 6 recap
Location: Gold Coast, Queensland Binna Burra
Assignment	Money earned	Possible earnings
$5,000 Shopping Spree	-$5,000	$5,000
Photo Hunt	$0	$5,000
Bike the Mountain	$10,000	$10,000
Free Pass Refund	$0	$20,000
Current Kitty	$57,000	$276,000
Free Passes
Crystal-Rose	Earned by evading the others in the Photo Hunt	
Elimination
Pete	6th player eliminated	

$5,000 Shopping Spree: After Crystal-Rose volunteered to for the Photo Hunt, the remaining players were split into two groups and told to, within three hours, spend exactly $5,000, in order to win $5,000 for the group kitty. To make this rather transparent task more challenging, numerous rules were put in place: the players could not own anything at the end of their time, they were not to spend more than $1,000 on anything, and they must not waste or give away any of the money. Ann-Maree, Bob, and David took a helicopter ride and later a boat ride. Alaina, Marc, and Pete rented a recording studio, drank expensive bottles of wine, and spent $1,000 on a three-course fancy lunch in a private room, complete with butlers and masseuses. They both had a few hundred dollars left with very little time remaining. After going through a few ideas, Ann-Maree, Bob, and David chose to spend their remaining dollars on scratch tickets, and simply put whatever winnings they'd get back into further scratch tickets until their money was all gone. The other group bought a $400 stamp and posted it to the store from which they bought it. The six of them reunited with the host within the time limit and had receipts for exactly $5,000, so it seemed the assignment was won. However, the $400 stamp was determined to have broken either the rule against wastage or the rule against gifts - a postage fee of less than a dollar need not be paid by $400 worth of stamps, and an antique stamp that's been posted once is not worthless, but merely worth less. Since the rules were broken, the $5,000 they spent came from the kitty.

Photo Hunt: During the shopping spree, Crystal-Rose prepared with a professional makeup artist and costumer to hide herself in Warner Bros. Movie World. If she could keep from being photographed by any of the other players for half an hour, she'd win a free pass through to the next episode, but if they spotted her, the group would win $5,000. She had the full complement of theme park costumes available for her choosing to pose as a character, but she chose to pose as a member of a family visiting the park, wearing a wig, eyeglasses, coloured contacts, and much padding under normal, but different, clothing to make her appear heavier. The others only came close to her once in the hour, when Alaina and Marc in fact got out of the way of Crystal-Rose and her "family" taking a photo themselves. Thus, no money was won and Crystal-Rose won her free pass.

Bike the Mountain: The players were told to travel to Binna Burra, at the top of a long, shallow hill. They started off with four bicycles and two motorized scooters, and had the opportunity three times within their two-hour time limit to answer quiz questions that would get them more scooters and fewer bicycles if answered correctly, but more bicycles and fewer scooters if answered incorrectly. Ann-Maree was permitted to withdraw herself from the assignment, as it would have been too physically taxing for her to have a realistic chance of completing it within the time limit. The host informed them just before they pulled out that the assignment was worth $10,000. At their first stop, they gained an additional scooter by correctly answering 225 as the number obtained by adding together all the odd numbers between 0 and 30. Between that stop and the next, there were signs on the side of the road showing the fifty states of the United States of America, and they had to recall forty of them to get another scooter. During this leg, Alaina complained loudly of Marc telling her to cycle faster, and switched midway through to a scooter, which she needed help to properly ride and nearly wound up crashing and hurting herself. This resulted in the entire group stopping to argue. They recited forty of the U.S. states at the second stop and obtained scooters for everyone. They narrowly succeeded in arriving under the time limit. The host asked them upon arriving in Binna Burra how much the assignment was worth, and they correctly responded $10,000, giving them that amount in the kitty.

Free Pass Refund: During the computer tests, Crystal-Rose was enjoying champagne with Grant as the others were in the testing rooms. Grant offered to add $20,000 to the kitty if she'd give back the free pass she earned from "Photo Hunt", but she refused.

After green screens appeared for Bob and Ann-Maree, the screen turned red when Pete's name was typed in. All of the players, most visibly Marc and Ann-Maree, were distraught to see him leave. Pete thought Marc was the Mole.

=== Episode 7 ===
Episode 7 recap
Location: Ormeau, Queensland Binna Burra
Assignment	Money earned	Possible earnings
Stunt Driving Relay Race	$9,000	$10,000
Photographic Scavenger Hunt	$5,000	$5,000
Diamond Heist	$3,000	$15,000
Current Kitty	$74,000	$306,000
Elimination
David	7th player eliminated	

Stunt Driving Relay Race: The players were presented with a relay race involving driving tricks. Ann-Maree and Crystal-Rose would have to slalom through traffic cones - forward and then backward. Alaina and Marc would then have to do a handbrake turn and reverse into a small box marked off by cones. Bob and David would last have to do two figure 8's around cones on a skidpan. The race against the clock was two laps, with each player needing to do their trick once in turn, on a fifteen-minute time limit. After completing their leg, the players had to hand the car off to the next person inside a box marked by blue flags. They were given some training and a dry run, but during the real run, there would be on top of each cone an egg, which, if dislodged, would cost a $500 penalty from the potential $10,000 value of the assignment. The first lap went strongly, with Ann-Maree slaloming perfectly, Marc doing a strong handbrake turn and reversing into the box (but losing time as he did not back up completely the first time), and David quickly completing his figure 8 laps on the skidpan. The second lap was less fluid - Crystal-Rose slalomed perfectly just as Ann-Maree had (and was cruising instead of racing, losing time), but Alaina knocked over two cones on her handbrake turn and Bob lost several seconds on the skidpan in addition to forgetting to put his seat belt on as he took off. They completed the race in 13 minutes 35 seconds. David, however, had not had his seatbelt on when he backed the car into the box of blue flags on the changeover to Crystal-Rose, after he had first overshot it. This meant he had to do his part again, in the 1 minute 25 seconds that remained on the clock. He made it with 2 seconds to spare, so $9,000 was won.

Photographic Scavenger Hunt: The host woke the players up in the middle of the night to present them with an assignment. They were split into two groups of three and each presented with a map showing a path through the park in Binna Burra where they were staying, a spotlight, and a camera. The assignment, for $5,000, was to photograph five distinct species of vertebrate animals within the park in one hour. Alaina, Crystal-Rose, and Marc found their first species in minutes, a pademelon. The other three found pademelons themselves shortly thereafter. The first group also found a tawny frogmouth. With the hour up, the groups reunited with the host, who had a wildlife expert with him to judge the footage. It was up to the discretion of the wildlife expert if they had photographed five species. He decided that the two pictures of pademelons were actually two different species, and some desperate shooting by David of a pond, looking for tadpoles, in fact found a few. In their last few minutes, Alaina, Crystal-Rose, and Marc found a yellow robin, bringing the group's total, somewhat serendipitously, to five species and success in the assignment.

Diamond Heist: The players were taken to an emptied warehouse into which five diamonds, behind an intricate laser security fence, were placed. Each of them had a value, from $1,000 to $5,000. If a player could make it through the laser fence with the diamond, the kitty would increase by its value, but if they grabbed a diamond and subsequently tripped a laser wire, the value of the diamond would be penalized from the kitty. They were lowered, one at a time, from a height, and given aerosol sprays with which they could see the laser wires. There was a collective time limit of five minutes. Marc went straight for the $3,000 diamond, but tripped a wire after 35 seconds. Crystal-Rose tripped a wire on the way to the $2,000 diamond after mere moments. Alaina tripped a wire on the way to the $1,000 diamond. David then retrieved both the $1,000 and $2,000 diamonds. Bob then tripped a wire with his hand just in front of the $3,000 diamond. Mere seconds remained for Ann-Maree's run, and though she made it to the $3,000 diamond safely, she did not grab it, because there was not sufficient time for her to make it back out with it.

- At the elimination, most of the players except Bob said that they least wanted David to win. David himself said that he did not want either Alaina or Crystal-Rose to win, and Bob did not want Alaina to out-survive him on the show. David's name was the first typed into the elimination screen, and, as it turned out, the screen turned red. He thought Bob was the Mole.

=== Episode 8 ===
Episode 8 recap
Location: Canungra, Queensland Brisbane, Queensland
Assignment	Money earned	Possible earnings
Paragliding	$5,000	$16,000
Stadium Art	$0	$5,000
Aerial I-Spy	$0	$5,000
Current Kitty	$79,000	$332,000
Elimination
Ann-Maree	8th player eliminated	

Paragliding: Alaina, Ann-Maree, Crystal-Rose, and Marc were given the task of tandem paragliding to a minimum height of 30 meters, and dropping a water balloon onto a six meter by six meter target below. Each time they hit the target, they'd win $1,000 for the group kitty, for a total of $8,000 potential winnings, as each of them had two water balloons to drop. Bob, at the same time, was charged with predicting the outcomes of each drop. Each prediction he got correct would win $1,000, but each one he got incorrect would lose $1,000. He would not know the outcome of any of the drops until the very end of the assignment. Bob predicted Alaina would miss both shots. She did miss the first, but hit the second, so she won $1,000 all told. Ann-Maree dropped her first balloon before she was prepared to take the shot, and it fell well away from the target. Her second shot also missed. Crystal-Rose and Marc missed both shots as well. Bob predicted a miss and a hit for Crystal-Rose and two misses for Ann-Maree and Marc, giving him six correct predictions and two incorrect, for $4,000 on his end of the assignment and $5,000 total winnings.

Stadium Art: After being selected as the two players with an artistic temperament, Crystal-Rose and Marc were taken to ANZ Stadium and told to, within 20 minutes, draw a picture of a platypus at least 80 by 30 meters in chalk with the machines normally used to draw lines and field markers. The others would then have to guess what animal the drawing represented, to win $5,000. The others thought it was either a platypus or a mole, and incorrectly guessed mole since the platypus did not seem to have a tail.

Aerial I-Spy: While Crystal-Rose and Marc were drawing their platypus, Alaina, Ann-Maree, and Bob went up in light aircraft to take photographs representing specific letters of the alphabet. It was up to them what would best represent a specific letter of the alphabet - they could take a picture of something that physically resembled the letter, or perhaps an object that began with or notably featured their particular letter. Alaina got the letters T and E, Ann-Maree A and R, and Bob was given B and Y. Upon reuniting at the football stadium, Crystal-Rose and Marc had to guess what six-letter word was made from their letters, in order to win $5,000. Bob photographed a bridge and the shape of a Y in a dirt track, Ann-Maree a reservoir and an airport, and Alaina trees and power lines (for "electricity"). Crystal-Rose and Marc were befuddled by the photos and could only guess "chirpy," but the correct word was "betray."

- At the elimination, after green screens came up for Marc and Bob, the red screen appeared when Ann-Maree's name was typed in. She also thought Bob was the Mole.

=== Episode 9 ===
Episode 9 recap
Location: Toogoolawah, Queensland Dunk Island
Assignment	Money earned	Possible earnings
Parachute Jumping	$5,000	$20,000
Temptation Island	-$24,000	$0
Jetski Maps	$5,000	$5,000
Free Pass Refund	$48,000	$48,000
Current Kitty	$113,000	$381,000
Free passes
—	Bob failed to keep all of the others from parachute jumping	
—	Marc originally paid $24,000 for a free pass while the group was on the island, but gave it back for that amount of money to instead be added to the kitty	
Elimination
Bob	9th player eliminated	

Parachute Jumping: At 2:00 am the night after the eighth elimination, the host woke Bob in his hotel room to tell him that the next day, each of them would be given the opportunity to do a solo parachute jump. If he could convince each of the other three to not go through with it, the group would win $10,000 and Bob would win the game's final free pass. The next morning, the host presented the assignment to all four players, telling them that there was $5,000 to be won for each of them that would do a solo jump. They had to first do a tandem jump before they were permitted to do the solo. Marc was excited to do the tandem jump, and the women both seemed reluctantly willing. Marc and Alaina did the tandem jump, but Crystal-Rose backed out. Once on the ground, Marc decided to go for the solo jump, but Alaina decided against it. Marc indeed did the solo jump, so only $5,000 (and no free pass) was won.

Temptation Island: After a relaxing dinner on Dunk Island, said by the host to be "temptation island," the players were taken away one by one to privately bid with money from the kitty to secure the game's final free pass. Bob bid $15,000, Marc bid $24,000, Alaina refused to bid entirely, and Crystal-Rose bid $5,500. The bids were not immediately revealed, and all were sent to take the computer test.

Jetski Maps: Before the elimination, the players had an assignment where they were split into pairs, by gender, and told to ride a jetski around the island and map it. They were then to pick their more accurate map of the two to submit for evaluation, and if it was at least 50% correct, $5,000 would be won. The women mostly played around on their ride and did not draw a particularly good map, but the men drew a map that won the money.

Free Pass Refund: At the elimination, Grant revealed that Marc had earned the free pass from "Temptation Island". Alaina, Bob, and Crystal-Rose were shocked by Marc's high bid of $24,000, as they worked very hard and very long to earn that amount. Subsequently, Grant offered Marc $48,000. That was the $24,000 Marc bid for the free pass and an additional $24,000. If Marc would give back the free pass, that amount would be added to the kitty. Marc said he was extremely unconfident of his chances, but agreed to give back the free pass for the money.

Marc's name was typed in first, and the green screen appeared, relieving him. Bob's name was typed in second, and the screen turned red. He again thought that Marc was the Mole, a suspicion he had been riding on since Episode 3.

=== Episode 10 ===
Episode 10 recap
Location: Cairns, Queensland Double Island, Queensland
Assignment	Money earned	Possible earnings
Heartstopper	$0	$5,000
Trivia Card Game	-$5,000	$30,000
Final Kitty	$108,000	$416,000
The Reveal
Marc	The Runner-Up	
Crystal-Rose	The winner of $108,000	
Alaina	The Mole	

Heartstopper: The players were each presented a frightening challenge: Alaina had to capture and release a wild snake, Crystal-Rose had to pet a leopard shark, and Marc had to swipe eggs from a very protective female saltwater crocodile's nest. They were connected to heart rate monitors and told that they must keep their heart rates below 150 beats per minute all day to succeed in the assignment. Alaina had to find a snake inside a garage, and, once it was captured, drive it out to the wilderness to release it. Her heart rate spiked near 150 only twice, when she thought she'd found the snake but in fact found only a bundle of rope, and then later when she touched the snake for the first time. She completed her task. Crystal-Rose also completed hers, scuba diving into a tank containing small sharks and petting one of them. Her heart rate spiked near 150 once as well, when she was nipped on the finger by a shark. Marc refused to attempt his task (he thought it was just too dangerous to even try, and all he had to do was to simply enter the enclosure), and the $5,000 was lost. Alaina and Crystal-Rose were shocked, as their tasks were more risky and dangerous than his.

Trivia Card Game: The players were taken to a casino and given $5,000 apiece in chips. They were to wager on questions the host asked, by placing their chips next to cards the host dealt that represented choices. Each correct answer would give them triple their wager back. They lost $1,000 on the first question, won $1,500 on the second, won $1,700 on the third, lost $3,000 on the fourth question, and lost $2,900 on the fifth and final question. They finished down $5,000 for the assignment, reducing the final kitty to $108,000.

The final computer test took place on Double Island. It revealed Crystal-Rose to be the winner, Alaina the Mole, and Marc the runner-up. Marc was suspicious about Alaina, but he thought Crystal-Rose was the Mole, which led to his defeat. Crystal-Rose thought it was Marc between episodes 2 and 9; no one selected Alaina as the Mole on the computer test until Crystal-Rose did at the very end. In fact, it was revealed that Crystal-Rose and Marc had suspected each other until it seemed Crystal-Rose had changed her mind right at the very last second, almost ending up in no one correctly identifying the Mole for the first time in the history of The Mole.

== Mole Activity ==
Unlike the past two seasons, there was no extra episode dedicated to revealing the Mole, the clues and his/her acts of sabotage. Instead, they were revealed at the end of Episode 10.

=== Sabotage ===
The following acts of sabotage were revealed in the final episode:

Campout: Alaina convinced her group to go for the gear both times when the other groups both took one duffel bag and one voucher. Also, as the players suspected at the time, the Mole indeed took the other $1,000 voucher when the host came to collect them. Alaina took the second piece of paper from Bob's pack.

Snipers: Alaina made no attempt to shoot anyone in the laser shootout, and purposely tripped an alarm wire and led Yasmin into a dead end so they'd be shot by Bob and David.

Gold Coast Shopping Spree: Alaina knew Yasmin would prefer the Bentley, but she insisted on picking the Lamborghini, costing $10,000.

Toughness: Both a sabotage and a clue, Alaina did not supply the others with the correct answer to the question "Which car manufacturer has a black bull as its logo?" It was Lamborghini, just like the one she'd test-driven earlier that day. This contributed to the loss of $5,000.

Cheating Test: Alaina tried to get Marc to read the folder in the greenroom that contained the questions and answers. Though Marc looked at the tab, he resisted the temptation, so the money from this assignment stood.

Luggage Drop: Alaina asked locals for the wrong directions, deliberately misinterpreting Marc's SMS and costing the team $5,000.

Surveillance: Alaina displayed a little quick thinking here, taking the phone from Ann-Maree in the passenger seat when she threw it at her and, just for a moment, talking on it while driving. It was enough to get the $5,000 for the assignment revoked, and cast suspicion on Ann-Maree. During the computer quiz aired in that episode, Bob says that Ann-Maree is suspicious because, according to him, "the woman turns and can divide this group in a snap of her fingers".

Bungee Jumping: Alaina jumped, but talked Ann-Maree and Crystal-Rose into not jumping, costing $1,000 directly and a potential of another $4,000 that would have been won if everyone jumped.

Photo Hunt: Alaina actually recognized Crystal-Rose within Movie World, but stopped Marc from walking straight towards her, keeping $5,000 from being won.

Bike the Mountain: The mishap Alaina had on the scooter was not deliberate, but she did milk it for as much time and drama as possible, nearly costing the assignment.

Stunt Driving Relay Race: Alaina was the only one to knock over any cones during the real run, costing $1,000.

Paragliding: After scoring a hit with her second water balloon, Alaina figured out that the proper technique was to drop it while hovering over top of the target. So, she told the others to throw the balloon at the target, ensuring that they'd miss.

Stadium Art: Ann-Maree and Bob both initially thought the drawing on the field was of a platypus, but Alaina convinced them to guess that it was a mole, costing $5,000.

Parachute Jumping: Alaina backed out of the solo jump, even though she desperately wanted to go through with it, after having greatly enjoyed the tandem jump. This cost another $5,000.

Trivia Card Game: Alaina, like Crystal-Rose and Marc, was given to start $5,000 in chips. She bet $3,500, did not win anything, but somehow had no chips left at the end of the assignment.

The following acts of sabotage were spotted during the series, but not mentioned in the final episode:

Luggage Reclaim: Alaina bought $1,000 from the kitty to get back the equipment she lost in the first episode of the season.

The Weakest Link: Alaina missed an easy $2,000 question in the second round, breaking the team chain and getting herself eliminated that round.

Charity: Alaina made no decent attempt to perform her charity activity, leaving Marc and Thao to do all the money raising.

Luggage Drop: Along with Crystal-Rose, Marc, Pete and Thao, Alaina voted to have the luggage back, incurring the loss of $5,000 from the team kitty.

Murder Game: Alaina denied the group $5,000 by solving the overnight murder and coming to the conclusion that Bob was the murderer, to which he admitted.

Relative Bungee: Alaina knew that her mother wouldn't jump, but predicted against that, costing another $1,000.

$5,000 Shopping Spree: Alaina did nothing to prevent Marc from purchasing a $500 stamp which she knew was wastage and against the rules of the assignment, costing the kitty another $5,000.

Diamond Heist: Alaina tripped an alarm wire attempting to steal the $1,000 diamond and told Ann-Maree to try to grab the $3,000 diamond as time was running out, costing the kitty another $4,000.

Jetski Maps: Alaina nor Crystal-Rose made a decent attempt to map out Dunk Island, both believing that Bob and Marc would do a better job in mapping out the dimensions of the island.

Others: Alaina spent money whenever possible, and put herself in a position of control in many assignments.

=== Clues ===
The following clues were revealed in the final episode:

Episode 1 Introduction: In the introduction where the players are first introduced, everyone was shown except Alaina, indicating that everyone who was shown was there to win money. Alaina replaced Janet in the episode two introduction.

The Eliminations: At the beginning of episode eight, each of the final five players (Alaina, Ann-Maree, Bob, Crystal-Rose, and Marc) had a confession talking about how nervous they were when seeing their names typed into the computer and how relieved they were when the green screen came up for them. However, Alaina was lying because her name was never once typed in during any of the eliminations.

The following clues were spotted during the series, but not mentioned in the final episode:

Player Introductions: In the first episode where all the players are introduced one-by-one, Alaina is introduced fourth, the word "mole" having four letters in it. Also, after the opening credits, Alaina is the fourth player shown getting out of the taxi.

Episode 4 Teaser: In the episode 4 teaser promoting the Weakest Link assignment shown at the end of episode 3, Grant is heard via voice-over saying: "Who is the Weakest Link?" and the contestants hold up their votes saying "Joe". As Grant says "Who is The Mole?", Joe is shown holding up his vote for "Alaina".

Temptation Island: Alaina refused to bid for an exemption because she knew she would be in the final three.
