= 2004 Hawthorn Football Club season =

80th season in the Australian Football League

Hawthorn Football Club
2004 season
- President: Ian Dicker
- Coach: Peter Schwab; Donald McDonald (interim)
- Captain: Shane Crawford
- Home ground: Melbourne Cricket Ground; Aurora Stadium
- AFL season: 4–18 (15th)
- Finals series: Did not qualify
- Best and Fairest: Peter Everitt
- Leading goalkicker: Nathan Thompson (36)
- Highest home attendance: 42,682 (Round 11 vs. Essendon)
- Lowest home attendance: 11,682 (Round 16 vs. Port Adelaide)
- Average home attendance: 25,349

The 2004 season was the Hawthorn Football Club's 80th season in the Australian Football League and 103rd overall. Following the season Alastair Clarkson was appointed as coach.

== Fixture ==
=== Premiership season ===
Rd	Date and local time	Opponent	Scores (Hawthorn's scores indicated in bold)			Venue	Attendance	Record
Rd	Date and local time	Opponent	Home	Away	Result	Venue	Attendance	Record
1	Saturday, 27 March (2:10 pm)	Melbourne	**17.17 (119)**	10.10 (70)	Won by 49 points	Melbourne Cricket Ground (H)	38,351	1–0
2	Sunday, 4 April (2:10 pm)	Kangaroos	**11.8 (74)**	15.13 (103)	Lost by 29 points	Melbourne Cricket Ground (H)	35,305	1–1
3	Sunday, 11 April (12:40 pm)	Port Adelaide	26.15 (171)	**13.12 (90)**	Lost by 81 points	AAMI Stadium (A)	27,421	1–2
4	Sunday, 18 April (2:10 pm)	Western Bulldogs	**14.13 (97)**	16.13 (109)	Lost by 12 points	Melbourne Cricket Ground (H)	24,959	1–3
5	Saturday, 24 April (7:10 pm)	Brisbane Lions	14.26 (110)	**9.8 (62)**	Lost by 48 points	The Gabba (A)	34,526	1–4
6	Friday, 30 April (7:40 pm)	Richmond	12.12 (84)	**13.5 (83)**	Lost by 1 point	Telstra Dome (A)	37,947	1–5
7	Sunday, 9 May (5:10 pm)	Geelong	**8.4 (52)**	15.18 (108)	Lost by 56 points	Telstra Dome (H)	28,612	1–6
8	Sunday, 16 May (1:10 pm)	Fremantle	**10.10 (70)**	8.13 (61)	Won by 9 points	Aurora Stadium (H)	14,554	2–6
9	Sunday, 23 May (1:10 pm)	Sydney	11.14 (80)	**12.7 (79)**	Lost by 1 point	Sydney Cricket Ground (A)	25,127	2–7
10	Saturday, 29 May (2:10 pm)	Adelaide	**6.11 (47)**	20.13 (133)	Lost by 86 points	Melbourne Cricket Ground (H)	22,942	2–8
11	Saturday, 5 June (2:10 pm)	Essendon	**12.8 (80)**	24.10 (154)	Lost by 74 points	Melbourne Cricket Ground (H)	42,682	2–9
12	Friday, 11 June (7:40 pm)	Carlton	15.10 (100)	**14.4 (98)**	Lost by 12 points	Telstra Dome (A)	47,302	2–10
13	Friday, 18 June (7:40 pm)	St Kilda	19.13 (127)	**9.7 (61)**	Lost by 66 points	Telstra Dome (A)	36,925	2–11
14	Saturday, 3 July (2:10 pm)	Collingwood	20.20 (140)	**11.9 (75)**	Lost by 65 points	Melbourne Cricket Ground (A)	44,329	2–12
15	Saturday, 10 July (1:10 pm)	West Coast	**12.10 (82)**	12.14 (86)	Lost by 4 points	Aurora Stadium (H)	15,581	2–13
16	Sunday, 18 July (2:10 pm)	Port Adelaide	**7.11 (53)**	15.15 (105)	Lost by 52 points	Melbourne Cricket Ground (H)	11,682	2–14
17	Saturday, 24 July (2:10 pm)	Kangaroos	22.11 (143)	**9.9 (63)**	Lost by 80 points	Melbourne Cricket Ground (A)	20,018	2–15
18	Sunday, 1 August (2:10 pm)	Melbourne	15.17 (107)	**9.9 (63)**	Lost by 44 points	Melbourne Cricket Ground (A)	28,392	2–16
19	Saturday, 7 August (7:10 pm)	Western Bulldogs	16.13 (109)	**19.6 (120)**	Won by 11 points	Telstra Dome (A)	22,330	3–16
20	Saturday, 14 August (2:10 pm)	Brisbane Lions	**6.7 (43)**	8.18 (66)	Lost by 23 points	Melbourne Cricket Ground (H)	17,159	3–17
21	Sunday, 22 August (2:10 pm)	Richmond	**16.13 (109)**	13.8 (86)	Won by 23 points	Melbourne Cricket Ground (H)	27,007	4–17
22	Sunday, 29 August (2:10 pm)	Geelong	17.21 (123)	**9.4 (58)**	Lost by 65 points	Skilled Stadium (A)	21,192	4–18

== Ladder ==
2004 AFL ladder
Pos	Team	Pld	W	L	D	PF	PA	PP	Pts	
1	Port Adelaide (P)	22	17	5	0	2413	1823	132.4	68	Finals series
2	Brisbane Lions	22	16	6	0	2447	1783	137.2	64	Finals series
3	St Kilda	22	16	6	0	2443	1909	128.0	64	Finals series
4	Geelong	22	15	7	0	2088	1741	119.9	60	Finals series
5	Melbourne	22	14	8	0	2127	1900	111.9	56	Finals series
6	Sydney	22	13	9	0	1938	1804	107.4	52	Finals series
7	West Coast	22	13	9	0	2042	1968	103.8	52	Finals series
8	Essendon	22	12	10	0	2282	2228	102.4	48	Finals series
9	Fremantle	22	11	11	0	1882	1870	100.6	44	
10	Kangaroos	22	10	12	0	2142	2135	100.3	40	
11	Carlton	22	10	12	0	1825	2235	81.7	40	
12	Adelaide	22	8	14	0	1950	2039	95.6	32	
13	Collingwood	22	8	14	0	1899	2082	91.2	32	
14	Western Bulldogs	22	5	17	0	1957	2459	79.6	20	
15	Hawthorn	22	4	18	0	1668	2375	70.2	16	
16	Richmond	22	4	18	0	1693	2445	69.2	16	

Source: AFL ladder
Rules for classification: 1) points; 2) percentage; 3) number of points for.
(P) Premiers
