= 2002 Hawthorn Football Club season =

78th season in the Australian Football League

Hawthorn Football Club
2002 season
- President: Ian Dicker
- Coach: Peter Schwab
- Captain: Shane Crawford
- Home ground: Melbourne Cricket Ground; York Park
- AFL season: 11–11 (10th)
- Finals series: Did not qualify
- Best and Fairest: Shane Crawford
- Leading goalkicker: Daniel Chick (31)
- Highest home attendance: 53,750 (Round 19 vs. Collingwood)
- Lowest home attendance: 15,066 (Round 3 vs. Fremantle)
- Average home attendance: 34,188

The 2002 season was the Hawthorn Football Club's 78th season in the Australian Football League and 101st overall.

== Fixture ==
=== Premiership season ===
Rd	Date and local time	Opponent	Scores (Hawthorn's scores indicated in bold)			Venue	Attendance	Record
Rd	Date and local time	Opponent	Home	Away	Result	Venue	Attendance	Record
1	Monday, 1 April (2:10 pm)	Melbourne	**15.13 (103)**	20.9 (129)	Lost by 26 points	Melbourne Cricket Ground (H)	43,484	0–1
2	Sunday, 7 April (1:10 pm)	Brisbane Lions	21.22 (148)	**6.10 (46)**	Lost by 102 points	The Gabba (A)	25,660	0–2
3	Sunday, 14 April (1:10 pm)	Fremantle	**13.11 (89)**	11.13 (79)	Won by 10 points	York Park (H)	15,066	1–2
4	Saturday, 20 April (2:10 pm)	Collingwood	15.14 (104)	**9.9 (63)**	Lost by 41 points	Melbourne Cricket Ground (A)	48,476	1–3
5	Saturday, 27 April (2:10 pm)	Richmond	**19.11 (125)**	12.11 (83)	Won by 42 points	Melbourne Cricket Ground (H)	39,694	2–3
6	Saturday, 4 May (2:10 pm)	Kangaroos	13.9 (87)	**24.11 (155)**	Won by 68 points	Melbourne Cricket Ground (A)	33,345	3–3
7	Saturday, 11 May (2:10 pm)	Geelong	**20.10 (130)**	11.12 (78)	Won by 52 points	Melbourne Cricket Ground (H)	38,709	4–3
8	Friday, 17 May (7:45 pm)	Carlton	**12.17 (89)**	12.8 (80)	Won by 9 points	Melbourne Cricket Ground (H)	39,142	5–3
9	Sunday, 26 May (1:40 pm)	West Coast	19.12 (126)	**14.4 (88)**	Lost by 38 points	Subiaco Oval (A)	38,646	5–4
10	Sunday, 2 June (1:10 pm)	Port Adelaide	**12.5 (77)**	17.15 (117)	Lost by 40 points	York Park (H)	18,112	5–5
11	Saturday, 8 June (2:10 pm)	Adelaide	14.18 (102)	**8.10 (58)**	Lost by 44 points	Football Park (A)	42,162	5–6
12	Friday, 14 June (7:45 pm)	Essendon	10.12 (72)	**10.5 (65)**	Lost by 7 points	Melbourne Cricket Ground (A)	40,470	5–7
13	Sunday, 30 June (2:10 pm)	St Kilda	11.12 (78)	**13.9 (87)**	Won by 9 points	Colonial Stadium (A)	28,928	6–7
14	Saturday, 6 July (2:10 pm)	Sydney	**11.8 (74)**	9.10 (64)	Won by 10 points	Melbourne Cricket Ground (H)	25,079	7–7
15	Friday, 12 July (7:45 pm)	Western Bulldogs	**17.14 (116)**	14.9 (93)	Won by 23 points	Colonial Stadium (H)	35,434	8–7
16	Saturday, 20 July (2:10 pm)	Melbourne	9.13 (67)	**14.9 (93)**	Won by 26 points	Melbourne Cricket Ground (A)	37,442	9–7
17	Saturday, 27 July (2:10 pm)	Brisbane Lions	**10.8 (68)**	18.16 (124)	Lost by 56 points	Melbourne Cricket Ground (H)	35,202	9–8
18	Saturday, 3 August (1:40 pm)	Fremantle	14.12 (96)	**4.11 (35)**	Lost by 61 points	Subiaco Oval (A)	24,332	9–9
19	Friday, 9 August (7:45 pm)	Collingwood	**15.15 (105)**	14.13 (97)	Won by 8 points	Melbourne Cricket Ground (H)	53,750	10–9
20	Friday, 16 August (7:45 pm)	Richmond	16.11 (107)	**13.15 (93)**	Lost by 14 points	Melbourne Cricket Ground (A)	39,391	10–10
21	Friday, 23 August (7:45 pm)	Kangaroos	**16.8 (104)**	17.17 (119)	Lost by 15 points	Melbourne Cricket Ground (H)	32,393	10–11
22	Friday, 30 August (7:45 pm)	Geelong	8.9 (57)	**11.9 (75)**	Won by 18 points	Colonial Stadium (A)	41,600	11–11

== Ladder ==
2002 AFL ladder
Pos	Team	Pld	W	L	D	PF	PA	PP	Pts	
1	Port Adelaide	22	18	4	0	2360	1783	132.4	72	Finals series
2	Brisbane Lions (P)	22	17	5	0	2520	1843	136.7	68	Finals series
3	Adelaide	22	15	7	0	2308	2007	115.0	60	Finals series
4	Collingwood	22	13	9	0	2081	1897	109.7	52	Finals series
5	Essendon	22	12	9	1	1939	1847	105.0	50	Finals series
6	Melbourne	22	12	10	0	2243	2245	99.9	48	Finals series
7	Kangaroos	22	12	10	0	2241	2269	98.8	48	Finals series
8	West Coast	22	11	11	0	2208	2254	98.0	44	Finals series
9	Geelong	22	11	11	0	1933	2029	95.3	44	
10	Hawthorn	22	11	11	0	1938	2107	92.0	44	
11	Sydney	22	9	12	1	2123	1976	107.4	38	
12	Western Bulldogs	22	9	12	1	2335	2246	104.0	38	
13	Fremantle	22	9	13	0	1900	2151	88.3	36	
14	Richmond	22	7	15	0	1801	2172	82.9	28	
15	St Kilda	22	5	16	1	1785	2271	78.6	22	
16	Carlton	22	3	19	0	1682	2300	73.1	12	

Source: AFL ladder
Rules for classification: 1) points; 2) percentage; 3) number of points for.
(P) Premiers
