= 2000 Hawthorn Football Club season =

104th season of the Australian Football League (AFL)

Hawthorn Football Club
2000 season
- President: Ian Dicker
- Coach: Peter Schwab
- Captain: Shane Crawford
- Home ground: Melbourne Cricket Ground
- AFL season: 12–10 (8th)
- Finals series: Semi-final (lost to Kangaroos 100–110)
- Best and Fairest: Daniel Chick; Nick Holland
- Leading goalkicker: Nick Holland (51)
- Highest home attendance: 53,776 (Round 1 vs. Collingwood)
- Lowest home attendance: 16,004 (Round 12 vs. Fremantle)
- Average home attendance: 34,417

The 2000 season was the Hawthorn Football Club's 76th season in the Australian Football League and 99th overall.

== Fixture ==
=== Premiership season ===
Rd	Date and local time	Opponent	Scores (Hawthorn's scores indicated in bold)			Venue	Attendance	Record
Rd	Date and local time	Opponent	Home	Away	Result	Venue	Attendance	Record
1	Monday, 13 March (2:10 pm)	Collingwood	**13.8 (86)**	20.20 (140)	Lost by 54 points	Melbourne Cricket Ground (H)	53,776	0–1
2	Sunday, 19 March (2:10 pm)	Carlton	22.12 (154)	**18.4 (112)**	Lost by 42 points	Optus Oval (A)	21,161	0–2
3	Saturday, 25 March (2:10 pm)	Brisbane Lions	**16.14 (110)**	15.13 (103)	Won by 7 points	Melbourne Cricket Ground (H)	20,374	1–2
4	Saturday, 1 April (2:10 pm)	Essendon	**14.6 (90)**	20.17 (137)	Lost by 47 points	Melbourne Cricket Ground (H)	46,889	1–3
5	Sunday, 9 April (8:10 pm)	Port Adelaide	10.14 (74)	**16.17 (113)**	Won by 39 points	Football Park (A)	22,086	2–3
6	Sunday, 16 April (2:50 pm)	Adelaide	22.11 (143)	**8.9 (57)**	Lost by 86 points	Football Park (A)	38,158	2–4
7	Saturday, 22 April (2:10 pm)	Western Bulldogs	**19.9 (123)**	14.8 (92)	Won by 31 points	Melbourne Cricket Ground (H)	29,405	3–4
8	Friday, 28 April (7:40 pm)	Kangaroos	9.13 (67)	**18.20 (128)**	Won by 61 points	Melbourne Cricket Ground (A)	36,514	4–4
9	Saturday, 6 May (2:10 pm)	Geelong	**14.14 (98)**	10.13 (73)	Won by 25 points	Melbourne Cricket Ground (H)	39,116	5–4
10	Friday, 12 May (6:40 pm)	West Coast	17.16 (118)	**13.10 (88)**	Lost by 30 points	Subiaco Oval (A)	37,549	5–5
11	Saturday, 20 May (2:10 pm)	Richmond	**11.11 (77)**	11.14 (80)	Lost by 3 points	Melbourne Cricket Ground (H)	41,057	5–6
12	Saturday, 27 May (7:40 pm)	Fremantle	**19.7 (121)**	8.14 (62)	Won by 59 points	Colonial Stadium (H)	16,004	6–6
13	Sunday, 4 June (2:40 pm)	Sydney	16.13 (109)	**11.12 (78)**	Lost by 31 points	Sydney Cricket Ground (A)	21,353	6–7
14	Sunday, 11 June (2:10 pm)	St Kilda	13.8 (86)	**27.9 (171)**	Won by 85 points	Melbourne Cricket Ground (A)	21,744	7–7
15	Saturday, 17 June (2:10 pm)	Melbourne	**10.12 (72)**	22.9 (141)	Lost by 69 points	Melbourne Cricket Ground (H)	39,215	7–8
16	Friday, 23 June (7:40 pm)	Collingwood	10.8 (68)	**19.11 (125)**	Won by 57 points	Colonial Stadium (A)	38,745	8–8
17	Sunday, 2 July (2:10 pm)	Carlton	**9.9 (63)**	18.12 (120)	Lost by 57 points	Melbourne Cricket Ground (H)	48,268	8–9
18	Sunday, 9 July (3:20 pm)	Brisbane Lions	16.10 (106)	**18.16 (124)**	Won by 18 points	The Gabba (A)	26,782	9–9
19	Saturday, 15 July (7:40 pm)	Essendon	25.15 (165)	**13.4 (82)**	Lost by 83 points	Colonial Stadium (A)	46,946	9–10
20	Saturday, 22 July (2:10 pm)	Port Adelaide	**15.11 (101)**	12.8 (80)	Won by 21 points	Melbourne Cricket Ground (H)	18,976	10–10
21	Saturday, 29 July (2:10 pm)	Adelaide	**15.8 (98)**	9.13 (67)	Won by 31 points	Melbourne Cricket Ground (H)	25,512	11–10
22	Friday, 4 August (7:40 pm)	Western Bulldogs	9.12 (66)	**11.15 (81)**	Won by 15 points	Colonial Stadium (A)	45,527	12–10

=== Finals series ===
Rd	Date and local time	Opponent	Scores (Hawthorn's scores indicated in bold)			Venue	Attendance
Rd	Date and local time	Opponent	Home	Away	Result	Venue	Attendance
Elimination final	Friday, 11 August (7:45 pm)	Geelong	12.11 (83)	**14.8 (92)**	Won by 9 points	Colonial Stadium (A)	44,709
Semi-final	Friday, 18 August (7:45 pm)	Kangaroos	16.14 (110)	**15.10 (100)**	Lost by 10 points	Melbourne Cricket Ground (A)	50,027

== Ladder ==
(P)	Premiers
	Qualified for finals

#	Team	P	W	L	D	PF	PA	%	Pts
1	Essendon (P)	22	21	1	0	2816	1770	159.1	84
2	Carlton	22	16	6	0	2667	1979	134.8	64
3	Melbourne	22	14	8	0	2557	2159	118.4	56
4	Kangaroos	22	14	8	0	2447	2304	106.2	56
5	Geelong	22	12	9	1	2234	2306	96.9	50
6	Brisbane Lions	22	12	10	0	2602	2222	117.1	48
7	Western Bulldogs	22	12	10	0	2321	2241	103.6	48
8	Hawthorn	22	12	10	0	2198	2251	97.6	48
9	Richmond	22	11	11	0	2068	2221	93.1	44
10	Sydney	22	10	12	0	2254	2219	101.6	40
11	Adelaide	22	9	13	0	2255	2347	96.1	36
12	Fremantle	22	8	14	0	1886	2618	72.0	32
13	West Coast	22	7	14	1	2216	2399	92.4	30
14	Port Adelaide	22	7	14	1	1928	2295	84.0	30
15	Collingwood	22	7	15	0	2089	2431	85.9	28
16	St Kilda	22	2	19	1	1855	2631	70.5	10

Rules for classification: 1. premiership points; 2. percentage; 3. points for
Average score: 103.4
Source: AFL Tables
