= 2001 Hawthorn Football Club season =

77th season in the Australian Football League

Hawthorn Football Club
2001 season
- President: Ian Dicker
- Coach: Peter Schwab; Chris Connolly (Round 17)
- Captain: Shane Crawford
- Home ground: Melbourne Cricket Ground; York Park
- AFL season: 13–9 (6th)
- Finals series: Preliminary Final (lost to Essendon 67–76)
- Best and Fairest: Joel Smith
- Leading goalkicker: John Barker (47)
- Highest home attendance: 52,472 (Round 17 vs. Carlton)
- Lowest home attendance: 16,595 (Round 18 vs. Fremantle)
- Average home attendance: 31,617

The 2001 season was the Hawthorn Football Club's 77th season in the Australian Football League and 100th overall.

== Fixture ==
=== Premiership season ===
Rd	Date and local time	Opponent	Scores (Hawthorn's scores indicated in bold)			Venue	Attendance	Record
Rd	Date and local time	Opponent	Home	Away	Result	Venue	Attendance	Record
1	Saturday, 31 March (2:10 pm)	Collingwood	**13.7 (85)**	11.15 (81)	Won by 4 points	Melbourne Cricket Ground (H)	52,190	1–0
2	Saturday, 7 April (2:10 pm)	Carlton	11.15 (81)	**16.11 (107)**	Won by 26 points	Optus Oval (A)	27,597	2–0
3	Sunday, 15 April (2:10 pm)	Fremantle	8.11 (59)	**11.16 (82)**	Won by 23 points	Subiaco Oval (A)	20,703	3–0
4	Sunday, 22 April (2:10 pm)	Melbourne	**11.17 (83)**	5.14 (44)	Won by 39 points	Melbourne Cricket Ground (H)	30,113	4–0
5	Saturday, 28 April (2:10 pm)	Western Bulldogs	19.12 (126)	**24.11 (155)**	Won by 29 points	Colonial Stadium (A)	34,400	5–0
6	Sunday, 6 May (2:10 pm)	Adelaide	**16.8 (104)**	12.19 (91)	Won by 13 points	York Park (H)	17,460	6–0
7	Saturday, 12 May (7:00 pm)	St Kilda	15.9 (99)	**16.14 (110)**	Won by 11 points	Colonial Stadium (A)	37,940	7–0
8	Saturday, 19 May (2:10 pm)	West Coast	**21.12 (138)**	8.10 (58)	Won by 80 points	Melbourne Cricket Ground (H)	22,988	8–0
9	Saturday, 26 May (7:40 pm)	Essendon	18.14 (122)	**8.9 (57)**	Lost by 65 points	Colonial Stadium (A)	50,701	8–1
10	Saturday, 2 June (2:10 pm)	Port Adelaide	**10.13 (73)**	17.14 (116)	Lost by 43 points	Melbourne Cricket Ground (H)	28,228	8–2
11	Saturday, 9 June (2:10 pm)	Geelong	14.9 (93)	**13.12 (90)**	Lost by 3 points	Colonial Stadium (A)	37,526	8–3
12	Saturday, 23 June (2:10 pm)	Kangaroos	**15.11 (101)**	14.14 (98)	Won by 3 points	Melbourne Cricket Ground (H)	41,295	9–3
13	Friday, 29 June (7:40 pm)	Brisbane Lions	20.20 (140)	**8.5 (53)**	Lost by 87 points	The Gabba (A)	30,573	9–4
14	Saturday, 7 July (2:10 pm)	Richmond	10.11 (71)	**20.9 (129)**	Won by 58 points	Melbourne Cricket Ground (A)	52,189	10–4
15	Saturday, 14 July (2:10 pm)	Sydney	**11.11 (77)**	14.14 (98)	Lost by 21 points	Melbourne Cricket Ground (H)	34,394	10–5
16	Saturday, 21 July (2:10 pm)	Collingwood	14.5 (89)	**21.18 (144)**	Won by 55 points	Melbourne Cricket Ground (A)	52,381	11–5
17	Sunday, 29 July (2:10 pm)	Carlton	**15.6 (96)**	13.15 (93)	Won by 3 points	Melbourne Cricket Ground (H)	52,472	12–5
18	Saturday, 4 August (2:10 pm)	Fremantle	**13.12 (90)**	16.10 (106)	Lost by 16 points	Colonial Stadium (H)	16,595	12–6
19	Saturday, 11 August (7:00 pm)	Melbourne	10.11 (71)	**24.12 (156)**	Won by 85 points	Melbourne Cricket Ground (A)	26,632	13–6
20	Sunday, 19 August (2:10 pm)	Western Bulldogs	**12.7 (79)**	17.23 (125)	Lost by 46 points	Melbourne Cricket Ground (H)	26,642	13–7
21	Sunday, 26 August (1:40 pm)	Adelaide	13.13 (91)	**8.5 (53)**	Lost by 38 points	Football Park (A)	42,827	13–8
22	Saturday, 1 September (7:00 pm)	St Kilda	**13.9 (87)**	13.11 (89)	Lost by 2 points	Melbourne Cricket Ground (H)	24,113	13–9

=== Finals series ===
Rd	Date and local time	Opponent	Scores (Hawthorn's scores indicated in bold)			Venue	Attendance
Rd	Date and local time	Opponent	Home	Away	Result	Venue	Attendance
Elimination final	Sunday, 9 September (2:30 pm)	Sydney	**19.15 (129)**	11.8 (74)	Won by 55 points	Colonial Stadium (H)	32,910
Semi-final	Saturday, 15 September (7:45 pm)	Port Adelaide	10.9 (69)	**10.12 (72)**	Won by 3 points	Football Park (A)	30,613
Preliminary final	Saturday, 22 September (2:30 pm)	Essendon	11.10 (76)	**9.13 (67)**	Lost by 9 points	Melbourne Cricket Ground (A)	86,468

== Ladder ==
2001 AFL ladder
Pos	Team	Pld	W	L	D	PF	PA	PP	Pts	
1	Essendon	22	17	5	0	2548	1895	134.5	68	Finals series
2	Brisbane Lions (P)	22	17	5	0	2538	1989	127.6	68	Finals series
3	Port Adelaide	22	16	6	0	2473	1918	128.9	64	Finals series
4	Richmond	22	15	7	0	2126	1973	107.8	60	Finals series
5	Carlton	22	14	8	0	2311	1797	128.6	56	Finals series
6	Hawthorn	22	13	9	0	2149	2041	105.3	52	Finals series
7	Sydney	22	12	10	0	2121	1833	115.7	48	Finals series
8	Adelaide	22	12	10	0	2085	2026	102.9	48	Finals series
9	Collingwood	22	11	11	0	2232	2088	106.9	44	
10	Western Bulldogs	22	10	12	0	2305	2458	93.8	40	
11	Melbourne	22	10	12	0	2136	2364	90.4	40	
12	Geelong	22	9	13	0	1926	2054	93.8	36	
13	Kangaroos	22	9	13	0	2161	2371	91.1	36	
14	West Coast	22	5	17	0	1708	2590	65.9	20	
15	St Kilda	22	4	18	0	1917	2642	72.6	16	
16	Fremantle	22	2	20	0	1794	2491	72.0	8	

Source: AFL ladder
Rules for classification: 1) points; 2) percentage; 3) number of points for.
(P) Premiers
