= 2003 Hawthorn Football Club season =

79th season in the Australian Football League

Hawthorn Football Club
2003 season
- President: Ian Dicker
- Coach: Peter Schwab
- Captain: Shane Crawford
- Home ground: Melbourne Cricket Ground; York Park
- AFL season: 12–10 (9th)
- Finals series: Did not qualify
- Best and Fairest: Shane Crawford
- Leading goalkicker: Nathan Thompson (38)
- Highest home attendance: 48,006 (Round 8 vs. Essendon)
- Lowest home attendance: 16,217 (Round 2 vs. West Coast)
- Average home attendance: 29,677

The 2003 season was the 79th season of the Hawthorn Football Club in the Australian Football League and its 102nd season overall.

== Fixture ==
=== Premiership season ===
Rd	Date and local time	Opponent	Scores (Hawthorn's scores indicated in bold)			Venue	Attendance	Record
Rd	Date and local time	Opponent	Home	Away	Result	Venue	Attendance	Record
1	Sunday, 30 March (2:10 pm)	Melbourne	16.10 (106)	**15.10 (100)**	Lost by 6 points	Melbourne Cricket Ground (A)	41,888	0–1
2	Sunday, 6 April (2:10 pm)	West Coast	**13.13 (91)**	14.5 (89)	Won by 2 points	York Park (H)	16,217	1–1
3	Saturday, 12 April (7:10 pm)	Port Adelaide	19.14 (128)	**11.5 (71)**	Lost by 57 points	AAMI Stadium (A)	24,902	1–2
4	Saturday, 19 April (7:10 pm)	Sydney	**17.8 (110)**	10.8 (68)	Won by 42 points	Melbourne Cricket Ground (H)	26,359	2–2
5	Saturday, 26 April (2:10 pm)	Richmond	**14.11 (95)**	18.7 (115)	Lost by 20 points	Melbourne Cricket Ground (H)	45,140	2–3
6	Saturday, 3 May (2:10 pm)	Carlton	9.9 (63)	**11.8 (74)**	Won by 11 points	Optus Oval (A)	27,725	3–3
7	Friday, 9 May (7:40 pm)	Kangaroos	**13.11 (89)**	18.8 (117)	Lost by 28 points	Telstra Dome (H)	32,435	3–4
8	Friday, 16 May (7:40 pm)	Essendon	**8.5 (53)**	15.16 (106)	Lost by 53 points	Melbourne Cricket Ground (H)	48,006	3–5
9	Sunday, 25 May (2:10 pm)	Geelong	16.13 (109)	**11.9 (75)**	Lost by 34 points	Telstra Dome (A)	28,001	3–6
10	Sunday, 1 June (2:10 pm)	St Kilda	17.16 (118)	**14.6 (90)**	Lost by 28 points	Melbourne Cricket Ground (A)	25,745	3–7
11	Saturday, 7 June (2:10 pm)	Adelaide	**11.9 (75)**	10.10 (70)	Won by 5 points	Melbourne Cricket Ground (H)	25,841	4–7
12	Sunday, 15 June (2:10 pm)	Collingwood	6.15 (51)	**12.12 (84)**	Won by 33 points	Melbourne Cricket Ground (A)	47,365	5–7
13	Sunday, 29 June (1:10 pm)	Fremantle	**15.8 (98)**	10.8 (68)	Won by 30 points	York Park (H)	17,212	6–7
14	Saturday, 5 July (2:10 pm)	Western Bulldogs	**23.16 (154)**	12.11 (83)	Won by 71 points	Melbourne Cricket Ground (H)	31,390	7–7
15	Sunday, 13 July (1:10 pm)	Brisbane Lions	14.9 (93)	**11.15 (81)**	Lost by 12 points	The Gabba (A)	29,684	7–8
16	Saturday, 19 July (2:10 pm)	Melbourne	**17.11 (113)**	15.16 (106)	Won by 7 points	Melbourne Cricket Ground (H)	32,029	8–8
17	Friday, 25 July (6:40 pm)	West Coast	14.14 (98)	**5.12 (42)**	Lost by 56 points	Subiaco Oval (A)	40,127	8–9
18	Sunday, 3 August (2:10 pm)	Port Adelaide	**11.14 (80)**	12.12 (84)	Lost by 4 points	Melbourne Cricket Ground (H)	21,415	8–10
19	Saturday, 9 August (7:10 pm)	Sydney	14.9 (93)	**17.8 (110)**	Won by 17 points	Sydney Cricket Ground (A)	33,473	9–10
20	Saturday, 16 August (7:10 pm)	Kangaroos	14.12 (96)	**16.14 (110)**	Won by 14 points	Telstra Dome (A)	29,234	10–10
21	Friday, 22 August (7:40 pm)	Carlton	**20.18 (138)**	10.4 (64)	Won by 74 points	Melbourne Cricket Ground (H)	30,406	11–10
22	Sunday, 31 August (2:10 pm)	Richmond	11.8 (74)	**11.12 (78)**	Won by 4 points	Melbourne Cricket Ground (A)	31,389	12–10

== Ladder ==
2003 AFL ladder
Pos	Team	Pld	W	L	D	PF	PA	PP	Pts	
1	Port Adelaide	22	18	4	0	2229	1752	127.2	72	Finals series
2	Collingwood	22	15	7	0	2259	1858	121.6	60	Finals series
3	Brisbane Lions (P)	22	14	7	1	2295	1882	121.9	58	Finals series
4	Sydney	22	14	8	0	2142	1862	115.0	56	Finals series
5	Fremantle	22	14	8	0	2143	2078	103.1	56	Finals series
6	Adelaide	22	13	9	0	2114	1754	120.5	52	Finals series
7	West Coast	22	12	8	2	2326	1982	117.4	52	Finals series
8	Essendon	22	13	9	0	2190	1960	111.7	52	Finals series
9	Hawthorn	22	12	10	0	2011	1999	100.6	48	
10	Kangaroos	22	11	10	1	2185	2223	98.3	46	
11	St Kilda	22	11	11	0	2095	2187	95.8	44	
12	Geelong	22	7	14	1	1819	2025	89.8	30	
13	Richmond	22	7	15	0	1846	2078	88.8	28	
14	Melbourne	22	5	17	0	1899	2344	81.0	20	
15	Carlton	22	4	18	0	1784	2674	66.7	16	
16	Western Bulldogs	22	3	18	1	2014	2693	74.8	14	

Source: AFL ladder
Rules for classification: 1) points; 2) percentage; 3) number of points for.
(P) Premiers
