= Kids' WB Australia =

- Genre: Children's show
- Country of origin: Australia
- Original language: English
- No. of seasons: 14

Production
- Production locations: GTV-9 Melbourne, Victoria
- Running time: 1 hour (approx.) – weekdays 4 hours (approx.) – weekends

Original release
- Network: Nine Network (2006–2012); 9Go! (2009–2019)
- Release: 16 September 2006 – 29 November 2019

Kids' WB (stylized as Kids' WB!) was an Australian children's television programme which aired on the Nine Network from 16 September 2006 to 29 November 2019. It is based on the US television block of the same name with the addition of hosted content, which was absent in its American counterpart. It was originally hosted by Georgia Sinclair and Shura Taft. The show is a television block which aired on weekend mornings and weekday afternoons, mainly consisting of cartoons and locally hosted variety-style segments, filmed at GTV-9 in Melbourne, itself owned by the Nine Network, and occasionally on location at Warner Bros. Movie World in Queensland. The show would not air over December and January. As of 2013, Kids' WB aired exclusively on 9Go!. Its final presenters were Lauren Phillips and Andy Sunderland.

== Hosts ==
Original Replacement Final

| Role | Name | First Show | Last Show |
| Host | Shura Taft | 16 September 2006 | 11 December 2010 |
| Host | Andrew Faulkner | 12 February 2011 | 12 July 2014 |
| Host | Shane Crawford | 19 July 2014 | 1 December 2018 |
| Host | Andy Sunderland | 9 February 2019 | 29 November 2019 |
| Host | Georgia Sinclair | 16 September 2006 | 13 December 2008 |
| Host | Heidi Valkenburg | 14 February 2009 | 11 December 2010 |
| Host | Lauren Phillips | 12 February 2011 | 29 November 2019 |

Notes

- Tayla Johnston and Andy Sunderland joined the show as roving reporters on 17 February 2018.

== History ==
On 20 August 2011, Kids' WB celebrated its 200th episode of the Saturday show on Nine.

In July 2013, the hosts travelled to Los Angeles, broadcasting from Warner Bros. studios in Burbank, California.

Kids' WB celebrated the 75th anniversary of Batman on 23 July 2014 with a Batman-themed day.

2015 saw the show celebrate its 10th anniversary year, with the hosts visiting Los Angeles in July to represent Australia in the international Razor Cart Championships. The 2015 season also featured classic Looney Tunes shorts which hadn't aired on Nine since 1992.

On 21 November 2019, TV Tonight reported that Kids' WB had been axed and that production on the series would conclude within two weeks. It was stated that the cancellation of the series was due to the expiry of the Nine Network's long-running output deal with Warner Bros. The final episode aired on 29 November 2019, ending the show's 13-year run.

== Time slot ==
Kids' WB premiered on 16 September 2006, in the time slot of Saturdays from 7:30am to 10:00am on Nine.

On 30 May 2009, the program moved to the later time slot of 9:00am to 11:30am to make way for Weekend Today.

With the launch of Nine's new multi-channel GO! (later renamed 9Go!) in 2009, extra Kids' WB content was added. From 9 August 2009, the show aired on Sundays from 7:00am to 11:00am as Kids' WB Sunday and Saturdays from 7:00am to 9:00am as Kids' WB Early Shift Saturday, before the main show on Nine.

On 6 March 2010, the main Kids’ WB Saturday show on Nine was moved to the later time slot of 10:00am to 12:30pm upon the premiere of Saturday Kerri-Anne. The Early Shift on GO! was extended to air from 7:00am to 10:00am.

Kids’ WB again moved to a later time slot on 30 April 2011, airing from 11:00am to 1:30pm, with Saturday Kerri-Anne being extended. The Early Shift on GO! was again extended to 7:00am to 11:00am, now branded as only Kids’ WB Saturday, to match Kids’ WB Sunday, also airing from 7:00am to 11:00am. This followed Kids’ WB Weekdays launching on 7 March 2011, airing from 4:00pm to 4:30pm weekday afternoons on GO!

Upon the 2013 return of Kids’ WB on 16 February 2013, the main show on Nine was dropped, with the show now airing exclusively on GO!, on Saturdays and Sundays from 7:00am to 11:00am, and weekday afternoons from 4:00pm to 5:00pm, with the weekday show being extended. It remained in these slots until its conclusion in 2019.

== See also ==
- List of longest-running Australian television series
