= The Mole (Australian TV series) season 6 =

The Mole
- Season 6
- Title card
- No. of episodes: 21

Release
- Original network: Seven Network
- Original release: 2 July – 16 October 2013

Season chronology
- ← Previous; Season 5

The sixth season of the Australian version of The Mole took place in various locations around Australia, and was hosted by Shura Taft.

== Show details ==
In October 2012, the Seven Network announced through its 2013 programming launch that The Mole would return following a seven-year absence. On 11 January 2013, it was announced that Shura Taft would be hosting the revived show.

The announced maximum kitty for the season was $250,000. The show premiered on Tuesday, 2 July at 7:30pm, and was originally going to air three nights a week, however, disappointing ratings resulted in the show reverting to airing only once a week, on Wednesday nights showing double episodes at 9:30pm; that took effect from the fifth episode until the eleventh episode. Further disappointing ratings, and a clash with a documentary on the Essendon Football Club supplements saga saw the show moved to an even later timeslot, airing at 10:30pm on Wednesdays; this took effect from the twelfth episode until the end of the season.

Terminations in this edition of The Mole were, in the early stages of the game, far less frequent than is typical of other editions – the first termination, for instance, did not occur until the conclusion of the third episode. They were also somewhat irregularly spaced, and could occur at any time within a particular episode. After the seventh termination, the game settled into the more widely utilised system of a quiz and termination occurring at the end of each episode.

=== Contestants ===
Twelve contestants participated this season. On 11 June 2013, the contestants were revealed:

| Player | Age | Hometown | Occupation | Outcome |
|---|---|---|---|---|
| Seble Kebede | 24 | Melbourne, Victoria | Law Graduate | 11th Place |
| Jayden "Mozzie" Irving | 21 | Frankston, Victoria | Life Guard | 10th Place |
| Linda Klemm | 42 | Gold Coast, Queensland | Medical Secretary | 9th Place |
| Alex Lee | 31 | Manly Vale, New South Wales | Engineer | 8th Place |
| Kerrie Odger | 28 | Mackay, Queensland | Mining Human Resources Manager | 7th Place |
| Ally Young | 28 | St Ives Chase, New South Wales | Design Consultant | 6th Place |
| Nick Baylart | 26 | Brisbane, Queensland | Art Gallery Assistant | 5th Place |
| Shaun Ramsey | 33 | Cairns, Queensland | Building Sales Representative | 4th Place |
| Sam Hutchins | 22 | Bathurst, New South Wales | AFL Development Officer | 3rd Place |
| Aisha Jefcoate | 22 | Geraldton, Western Australia^{1} | Communications Graduate | Runner-up |
| Erin Dooley | 24 | Geelong, Victoria | Sponsorship Co-ordinator | The Mole |
| Hillal Kara-Ali | 22 | Granville, New South Wales | Muslim Community Youth Leader | Winner |

^{1} Aisha Jefcoate has, since the end of filming, moved to Sydney as she tries to pursue a career in television presenting.

=== Termination chart ===
Termination Chart
| Player | Quiz 1 | Quiz 2 | Quiz 3 | Quiz 4 | Quiz 5 | Quiz 6 | Quiz 7 | Quiz 8 | Quiz 9 | Final Quiz |
|---|---|---|---|---|---|---|---|---|---|---|
| Erin | IN | IN | SAFE | 3 | SAFE | 2 | IN | IN | IN | MOLE |
| Hillal | IN | IN | 2 | 1 | 4 | SAFE^{[a]} | IN | IN | IN^{[c]} | WON |
| Aisha | IN | IN | 2 | 3 | 4 | 4 | IN | IN | IN | RUNNER-UP |
| Sam | IN | IN | 2 | IN | 3 | SAFE^{[b]} | | | OUT | |
| Shaun | IN | 1 | 1 | 2 | 5 | 1 | IN | OUT | | |
| Nick | IN | IN | IN | 1 | 4 | 1 | OUT | | | |
| Ally | IN | IN | 1 | 1 | 6 | 5 | | | | |
| Kerrie | IN | 1 | 4 | 3 | OUT | | | | | |
| Alex | IN | IN | IN | 1 | | | | | | |
| Linda | IN | IN | OUT | | | | | | | |
| Mozzie | IN | OUT | | | | | | | | |
| Seble | OUT | | | | | | | | | |

- ^{a} indicates which contestant successfully defended the Exemption for that specific Quiz.
- ^{b} In a silent auction, Sam bid on and won, for $70,000, 'The Ultimate Exemption', which allowed him to be exempt from termination, undefended until Quiz 9.
- ^{c} Hillal had 30 seconds taken off his time for this quiz after winning the Go Mole assignment in Week 14.

Indicates the player won the game
Indicates the player was the mole
Indicates the player won an exemption for the next quiz
Indicates the player won an exemption, but either gave it back for money or lost it in a later assignment
Indicates the player lost an exemption, but used freebies on the quiz to correct wrong answers, indicated by the number
Indicates the player used freebies on the quiz to correct wrong answers, indicated by the number
Indicates the player used freebies on the quiz to correct wrong answers, indicated by the number, and was terminated
Indicates the player scored the lowest on the quiz without holding any freebies or exemptions and was terminated
Indicates the player won an exemption, but either gave it back for money or lost it in a later assignment and was terminated
Indicates the player had 30 seconds taken off their time for this specific quiz

== Summary ==
=== Week 1 ===
Week 1 recap
Original airdates: 2, 3 and 4 July 2013 Locations: Stockton Dunes, New South Wales Blue Mountains, New South Wales Middle Head, New South Wales
| Assignment | Money earned | Possible earnings |
|---|---|---|
| The Drop Off | $9,200 | $15,000 |
| Exemption Temptation | -$4,600 | $0 |
| High Wire Relay | $2,000 | $16,000 |
| Money Bags | $10,800 | $22,000 |
| Key to Comfort | -$2,450 | $0 |
| Scales of Justice | $1,250 | $2,450 |
| Chain Gang | $10,000 | $10,000 |
| Current Pot | $26,200 | $65,450 |
Exemptions
| – | Kerrie decided to keep the free pass in the Free Pass Temptation assignment, but later lost it in the Chain Gang assignment | |
Termination
| Seble | 1st player terminated | |

The Drop Off: The twelve players were divided into three teams of four. After being dropped off at sites with a similar distance to the flag, the quartets were instructed to navigate their way to the flag within two hours (with each team earning $5,000 for their timely arrival with the luggage). If a team decided that they could not make it in time, they could use an 'emergency' envelope, which would allow them to be transported by vehicle to the flag, however they would receive no money. Additionally, $100 was forfeited for every piece of luggage not carried to the flag. The team of Alex, Ally, Shaun and Seble arrived via the emergency vehicle, and eight bags of luggage were left behind, therefore, only $9,200 of the $15,000 on offer was won.

Exemption Temptation: After being elected as the treasurer of the team, the host offered Kerrie the first exemption of the game, if she agreed to pay back half of what the team had already earned. After a thirty-second decision, Kerrie decided to keep the exemption, and thus $4,600 was lost from the pot.

High Wire Relay: The players were divided into two teams of six and provided with a baton. One member from each team was to climb onto a wire 20 stories above the ground and pass the baton over to the other player outside of a designated "red zone", before crossing over each other to the other side. If anyone was in the red zone during the exchange, they fell off or the baton dropped, they would lose the money, and the money would reset to zero. If they made a successful pass and cross, the amount of money won would be doubled. Two team members, Erin and Kerrie, fell off the rope and despite the fear of heights for several players, all team members were able to complete the challenge.

Money Bags: The players were divided into two teams of six and divided across a 5 km track. The goal was to meet in the middle along the way hauling several 10 kg bags worth $100 each. They were also provided with equipment to help carry the bags along the way, including poles, ropes and tyres. Both teams opted to carry 80 kg each. Along the way, if the teams met up at certain bonus points along the track, they would receive bonus money with amounts varying from $50 to $10,000 (among others). The team with Sam and Kerrie discovered a champagne tower that was worth $10,000 and the team were to decide whether to trade it or not, and if they tipped the tower, it would have to be rebuilt within 10 seconds, or the money would not count. The team opted to make the switch and were required to carry the tower along the rest of the route. Despite some spillage and one drop (which was rectified within 10 seconds), the teams met up, winning the money.

Key to Comfort: The players were divided into teams of 3 and ordered to find 12 keys hidden along a ground maze. Each key would unlock a chest that contained something that would assist them with camping, which they would do for the night. Six keys were initially found, although Jayden and Sam later opted to hide their keys as the person holding the key had the final say in what chest was opened. When the keys were found, an extra twist was added where each chest had a monetary value that would be deducted from the pot. The teams opted for tents ($500) and food rations ($100) together, while three other keys were used by the people holding them to provide sleeping mats ($750), Dinner and Desert ($1,000) as well as toilet paper ($100).

Scales of Justice: The players were divided into two teams, called "Builders" and "Problem Solvers". The builders were shown a diagram depicting an unbalanced scale, of which they had to use pieces of long timber, varying in length, to construct the unbalanced scale as it was shown on the card. This part of the assignment was failed. The problem solvers' task was to then balance the scales, of which they could only make five moves. This part of the assignment was successful and $1,250 was won.

Chain Gang: The players were handcuffed together in a long, continuous chain. In the middle of them was a pedestal with a key and an exemption token, which would rise at five-minute intervals from the hour-long time limit for thirty seconds. The players then had to make a choice to either take the key or the exemption token. If every player chose the key and unlocked themselves individually, then they win $10,000 for the pot, however if just one player chooses the exemption, the money would be revoked and the players who remained chained would have to spend the entire night handcuffed to the chain. All twelve players took the key, with Sam taking the key in the final rise of the pedestal and the assignment was won.

=== Week 2 ===
Week 2 recap
Original airdates: 9 and 10 July 2013 Locations: Sydney Harbour, New South Wales Melbourne, Victoria Brighton, Victoria
| Assignment | Money earned | Possible earnings |
|---|---|---|
| Speed Reader | $1,700 | unknown |
| Map Madness | $5,000 | $5,000 |
Quiz 2 & Termination
| Treasure Hunt | $0 | $5,000 |
| Path to Temptation | $3,000 | $14,500 |
| Current Pot | $35,900 | $89,950 |
Freebies
| Shaun, Alex, Sam, Kerrie, Hillal and Ally | Earned by arriving towards Shura first in the Map Madness assignment | |
Termination
| Jayden | 2nd player terminated | |

Speed Reader: The eleven remaining players were to find two players who were good at reading. Shaun and Linda were isolated from the group, and were to be involved in a later part of the assignment. From the remaining eight players, three of them – Alex, Jayden and Sam – were put on a jet-boat and assigned to identify a category and a letter, from six sightings, of which they had to identify particular items beginning with that letter (for example, they would have to write down as many fruit they could think of starting with the letter 'o'). The remaining six players were divided into pairs and tasked to paint two posters per pair containing the required letter and category, before holding them up as the boat passed. Shaun and Linda were then to try to identify some of the answers to win money. They got three movies starting with 'z' ($1,500 in total) and one fruit starting with 'o' ($200), thus winning $1,700.

Map Madness: Aisha and Hillal were selected by the group as two players who were good at reading maps, and were taken to a vantage point in Melbourne. The remaining nine players were split into two groups and began at different starting locations, to be guided by either Aisha or Hillal towards an "unknown destination", where Shura would be waiting. There were also intermediate buildings that each group could be directed towards, which contained clues about Shura's destination. If both groups reached Shura within the 90-minute time limit, $5,000 would be won. Additionally, the first team to reach him within that time limit would also earn "freebies", which would allow the players to correct a wrong answer during any subsequent quiz. Both groups found Shura at Degraves Street, within the time limit, thus winning $5,000.

It was after this assignment in which Shura revealed that the eleven remaining players would have to take the quiz – thus breaking from the tradition of completing the quizzes after every three (or more) assignments during the game. Jayden scored the lowest score in this quiz, and was subsequently terminated from the game.

Treasure Hunt: The day after Jayden's termination, the players were asked to pick a person in charge of winning the money up for grabs. Erin was chosen and was put on a boat, where she would try to decipher a message that the players would try to create. The words were on kites that were to be found in a few sheds. They had a compass and a length of twine above the first clue to find the locations of the clues. They found the second clue with a kite but never found the third. Linda measured while all the others were digging but no one listened to her even though she was right above the third clue. Upon returning from the boat, Erin said she saw nothing, after which the host reveals that the third clue was right behind Hillal. They dug and found the last clue with a key that unlocked a beach house containing the rest of the kites, so $5,000 went begging.

Path to Temptation: The ten players were taken to a large hall within Melbourne's State Library, where twelve boxes were placed in a circular path. One by one, each player would take a lap around the hall, open each box and discover its contents, but not be allowed to reopen the box once they have closed it. Upon completing a lap of the hall, each player would then elect the next person to take the lap around the hall, and repeat the same process. Hillal was the only player to win any money for the group, taking $5,000 on his lap, which was also the first of the assignment, whilst Shaun elected not to open even a single box on the final lap of the assignment. Upon its completion, two rule breaches were uncovered: Hillal was audibly heard talking to Sam during the latter's lap around the hall, whilst Sam could also be heard whispering to Aisha during her lap of the hall. This resulted in a $2,000 penalty from the $5,000 that was earned, meaning only $3,000 was won in this assignment.

=== Week 3 ===
Week 3 recap
Original airdate: 17 July 2013 Locations: Geelong, Victoria Melbourne, Victoria Docklands, Victoria
| Assignment | Money earned | Possible earnings |
|---|---|---|
| Steps | $0 | $30,000 |
| Gutter Madness | $3,000 | $5,000 |
Quiz #3 & Termination
| Hostage Rescue | $10,000 | $10,000 |
| Pixels | $5,000 | $5,000 |
| Current Pot | $53,900 | $139,950 |
Exemptions
| Erin | Earned in Path to Temptation assignment in the previous episode | |
Termination
| Linda | 3rd player terminated | |

Steps: The remaining ten players were asked to answer ten questions about their fellow players. Prior to the assignment starting, Shura made an offer that if the last remaining player found him on the same step, the team would potentially win $30,000, but if they didn't they would lose $10,000 from the kitty. They declined this offer. They all started at the bottom of a staircase on a beach, and for each answer they gave, being a numerical value, they would have to take that many number of steps up the staircase, leaving behind one person after each answer. If after the end of ten questions, the last remaining player landed on the same step as Shura, they would win the money, but if they either fell short or finished ahead, then nothing would be won. Eventually, the last remaining player, Kerrie, ended up just 12 steps short of Shura, thus missing out on the money. It was then revealed that they had answered half of the ten questions wrong.

Gutter Madness: The players were to transport a ball from the top of a hill into a milk carton using pipes of varying length, within a time limit of one hour. If the players dropped the ball, then they would have to start again from scratch. At 28 minutes, it was thought that the assignment was won, but a rule violation was revealed whereby Nick was revealed to have held together two pipes using two hands. This resulted in a $2,000 penalty from the pot, but with 28 minutes remaining they were successful in re-attempting the assignment, and thus $3,000 was won.

Following this assignment, the standard termination took place, and whilst Erin had the exemption, she also had the power to decide whether the termination should go ahead; after being shown three undisclosed players who were definitely safe, she decided to press on with the termination, during which Linda was shown the red screen and subsequently terminated.

Hostage Rescue: At 5:30am the morning after Linda's termination, Hillal and Sam were extracted from the group's hotel, and taken to a secret location in Melbourne where the players were to try to locate them. The remaining players found a mobile phone during breakfast with a message flashed on it, revealing an image with Hillal and Sam in front of a road distance sign, and instructions to "find them for $10,000". The players were allowed to call the pair to ask them questions, but there were some twists: they were allowed to ask Hillal and Sam anything, but they could only answer "yes" or "no" to them (any other form of answering would result in a $1,000 penalty from the potential $10,000 winnings, however, an answer of "yes-no" was allowed, which the players interpreted as being "maybe") – additionally, they could only make a maximum of fifteen phone calls, each of which had a 30-second time limit. The players split themselves into two groups, and after eight phone calls, agreed not to make any more until they reached the Melbourne CBD. Upon reaching the city, the players eventually located Hillal and Sam in a tall, clock tower, in two hours and 48 minutes, thus winning the money.

Pixels: The players were divided into two groups and asked to form pixelated images of two famous celebrities, from which the other group would try to identify him or her. Team One would try to create a pixelated image of Dame Edna Everage, whilst Team Two would try to create a pixelated image of Guy Sebastian. Each team had a time limit of two hours in which to create their pixelated images. Both teams successfully identified each other's work from a certain distance, and thus $5,000 was won ($2,500 for each correct answer).

=== Week 4 ===
Week 4 recap
Original airdate: 24 July 2013 Locations: Geelong, Victoria Melbourne, Victoria St Kilda, Victoria Myrniong, Victoria (Lake Dewar Lodge)
| Assignment | Money earned | Possible earnings |
|---|---|---|
| Aeroplane Acrobatics Challenge | $4,000 | $10,000 |
| Down the Line | $0 | $10,000 |
| Freebie Gamble | N/A | |
| Spot the Difference | $2,000 | $22,500 |
| Flying Piñatas | $13,500 | $25,000 |
| Current Pot | $73,400 | $207,450 |
Freebies
| Aisha, Alex, Ally, Erin, Kerrie and Nick | Freebie Gamble assignment | |
| Alex, Sam and Shaun | Flying Piñatas assignment | |
Termination
| Alex | 4th player terminated | |

Aeroplane Acrobatics Challenge: The remaining players were asked to divide themselves into four mavericks and five wingmen. The four mavericks were to each take a turn in an aeroplane and describe how the plane would fly, and relay this information to the five wingmen down on the ground. The five wingmen on the ground were split into two groups and, based on the instructions they were given by the mavericks, would try to identify which of the aerobatic manoeuvres was being performed. The first two correct guesses would each win $2,000 into the kitty, and any further correct guesses would each win $3,000 for the kitty. The wingmen made only two correct guesses, therefore winning $4,000 for the kitty.

Down the Line: The nine players were given a briefcase each, each with a tag, which had the name of an Australian town on it. Sam and Hillal remained at the starting point, whilst the other seven players were sent out to designated stops within the tram line. They both started with one briefcase each, with the towns "Noosa Heads" and "Alice Springs" tagged on them. From those two, they would have to identify which town was the furthest from Melbourne, and the person with that briefcase would board the tram, and relay the instructions of the assignment to the other seven players. There were also a few twists – at each stop, each player would have only sixty seconds to decide which town was furthest, and if nobody boarded the tram, then $10,000 would be taken away from the kitty. A warning bell would sound when there were ten seconds left to decide which town was the furthest. In the end the players decided Mount Isa was the furthest town from Melbourne, however, the correct answer was Katherine, so therefore no money was won.

Freebie Gamble: Shura handed one freebie to each to the players to keep. They can decide whether to keep the freebie or gamble it away for three freebies or nothing. Each player had to face Shura and guess how many Mole cards he was holding inside a large box (up to three Mole cards). A correct guess meant that they would earn three freebies; an incorrect guess meant they lose their freebie and end up with nothing.

Spot the Difference: The players were shown two identical scenes within a frame, and were asked to spot as many differences as they could. At the end, each player was asked to uniquely identify each difference within the two identical screens, and each correct difference would be worth $2,500 for the pot, but any wrong answer would reset all the money won up to that point. After Shaun got the final difference wrong, the pot was reset to zero, however, the group were given another chance to redeem themselves through one person; if that person could spot the three differences that they initially missed, then they would win $1,000 for each one that they identified. Kerrie correctly identified two of the three remaining differences, thus winning $2,000 in this assignment.

Flying Piñatas: The players were to slide down a gauge, which contained twelve piñatas ranging from freebies to up to $25,000 for the pot. However, there was a twist – each player would first have to pick a bat, and whoever's name was on it, that player would be playing for (for example, if Erin picked out Ally's bat, then Erin would try to win some prizes for Ally). Additionally, they could only hit one piñata in their leg – any subsequent piñatas they hit during their leg would put that one out of play. During Shaun's leg of the race, he successfully hit the $5,000 piñata but then hit the $10,000 piñata later on, putting that value out of play. In the end, $13,500 was won, whilst many other players received freebies.

=== Week 5 ===
Week 5 recap
Original airdates: 31 July 2013 (Sydney and Brisbane markets only) 7 August 2013 (all markets; double-episode for the southern states only) Locations: Cronulla, New South Wales Southern Highlands, New South Wales Marsden Park, New South Wales Penrith, New South Wales
| Assignment | Money earned | Possible earnings |
|---|---|---|
| Mole on Ice | $2,000 | $40,000 |
| Smoke Signals | $1,500 | $5,000 |
| Archery Exemption | N/A | |
| Exemption Defence | $15,000 | $15,000 |
| Envelope Temptation | $3,000 | $5,000 |
| Cash Flow | $15,000 | $30,000 |
| Current Pot | $109,900 | $302,450 |
Freebies
| Ally and Shaun (3 each) | Earned in the second round of the Mole on Ice assignment | |
| Ally, Hillal, Nick, Sam, and Shaun | Earned in the Envelope Temptation assignment | |
Exemption
| – | Aisha, Hillal and Sam all lost their exemptions in the Exemption Defence assignment | |
| Erin, Kerrie | Won an exemption in the Envelope Temptation assignment | |
Termination
| – | No one faced termination this week | |

Mole on Ice: The eight remaining players were taken to a makeshift ice hockey rink on Sydney's Cronulla beach. There were up to ten goal nets, five on each side, each ranging from $1,000 to $5,000 ($1,000 being the biggest goal net and $5,000 being the smallest). The players divided themselves into two groups by gender, and each person in each group would have two shots at trying to hit the pucks into the goal nets. The women went first, and managed to net $2,000, in one minute and fifty seconds, however, to win the money, the men would have to either match or beat that value in a lesser time. The men managed to net the same amount, in one minute and four seconds, thus winning the money. Later on, the groups would face each other in a virtual game of ice hockey to win freebies for the quizzes.

Smoke Signals: The players were to split into pairs, and each were to guard a smoke pot, with Sam and Ally guarding the safe, which held $5,000 in it. To unlock it, the players would have to relay the code from the first pair to the last, using only smoke signals. The first pair of Shaun and Erin received a text message from Shura telling them how to decipher the code, which they would find through a four-digit code, each number coming from the barcodes of the four terminated players' bags. They figured out that the code was 2163, and, using only smoke signals, they would try to relay it to the next pair of Hillal and Kerrie, who would then try to relay it to Nick and Aisha, then to Sam and Ally, who eventually deciphered the code as being 1243. This code was incorrect, meaning the lock would not open. However, Shura then offered the other pairs the chance to win the money, if they agreed to gamble a certain amount of money out of the pot. Each of them declined until Shaun and Erin were offered the chance to key in the code, which they eventually did correctly. As they risked $3,500 in keying in the code, only $1,500 was won in this assignment.

Archery Exemption: The players were given an opportunity to earn an exemption for the next Quiz and a twenty-minute read of another player's Mole Diary. They had to each take one shot at a target with a bow and arrow. The player who shot closest to the center of the bullseye would earn the exemption. Aisha won the exemption and then took a shot of Shaun's diary.

Exemption Defence: As the three players holding exemptions at the time of the game, Aisha, Hillal and Sam were tasked with trying to defend their exemptions by taking a Mole flag, located in the middle of a paintball field, to the other side of the field without being hit. If they successfully did that, then they would retain their exemption, but if they were hit, then their game would be over and they would lose their exemption. The remaining players were split into three pairs, and their assignment was to hunt down the defenders within a time limit of five minutes. For each defender that was hit, $5,000 would be added to the kitty, but if the defenders survived the five minutes, they would retain their exemptions. In the end, all of the defenders were hit, losing their exemptions in the process and with $15,000 added to the kitty.

Envelope Temptation: Shura provided the players another offer for freebies. However, they were given a choice between a various amount of freebies or a mystery prize in an envelope. The envelope prizes ranged from Exemptions for Quiz #5 to freebies to money for the group pot to Hidden Questions for an upcoming Quiz. The number of freebies on offer were up to Shura's decision. The players could choose Shura's freebies at any point, but with every refusal of the freebies, there would be more added to Shura's offer to tempt the players away from the envelopes.

Cash Flow: The players were split into two groups; one would be rafting a boat across a water path from the start to the finish line, whilst another would try to throw balls ranging from $500 to $5,000 into the boat. The only way that this money could be won is if everyone remained in the raft at the end of the lap, along with the balls that they managed to collect. The first team of Erin, Kerrie, Nick and Sam successfully earned $7,000 in the first lap, whilst the second, despite some hiccups, were able to win $8,000, for a grand total of $15,000.

=== Week 6 ===
Week 6 recap
Original airdate: 14 August 2013 Locations: Summer Hill, New South Wales Darlinghurst, New South Wales
| Assignment | Money earned | Possible earnings |
|---|---|---|
| Beat the Mole | -$12,000 | $16,000 |
| Domino Effect | $0 | $3,000 |
| Exemption Refund | -$15,000 | $0 |
| Current Pot | $82,900 | $321,450 |
Exemption
| – | Kerrie refunded her exemption to save $15,000 from the group pot. | |
Termination
| Kerrie | 5th player terminated | |

Beat the Mole: The eight players were faced with a 16-storey high silo which they were to abseil, facing down. Whether the players chose to do the task or not was completely their choice, but there was a twist: the actual assignment was for the Mole to bet on whether they would actually abseil or not. Each player was extracted from the group separately by Shura, and each were asked questions of varying topics ranging from the fashion trends of the players to the Australian economy, whilst the Mole (whose identity still remained a secret) was given a secret assignment to bet on whether the genuine players, including the Mole himself or herself, would abseil down the silo or not. If he or she incorrectly predicted whether the players would abseil down the silo, the team would win $2,000 towards the pot, however, if he or she correctly predicted that they would do the challenge, then $2,000 would be lost from the pot. Hillal was the only player to even abseil down the silo, whilst the other seven refused to attempt the task, with Nick, Aisha and Kerrie refusing to even climb up the silo. Seven of the eight predictions were correct, with only Sam refusing to abseil when it was thought that he would, therefore losing $12,000 from the pot.

Domino Effect: The players were taken to Sydney's National Art School, where they were split into two groups. One group began at the upper level while the other began at the lower level. Both groups were to arrange a set of 33 tables and 300 dominoes from one end of the room (on the upper level) to the other (on the lower level) in any arrangement, within a time limit of forty minutes. If successful, $3,000 would be won. The objective was that, at the end of the domino fall, the last domino would push a button that was to release confetti. However, the team ran out of time with Aisha accidentally knocking over a row of dominoes in the final minute, as well as the tables being incorrectly set up. Therefore, no money was won.

Exemption Refund: At the end of the Domino Effect assignment, Erin and Kerrie, as the two players who were holding exemptions at the time, were offered to refund their exemptions, or keep them at a cost of $15,000 from the pot. Erin decided to keep her exemption token losing $15,000 from the pot, however, Kerrie decided to refund it, saying that "she did not come onto the show to be a selfish person", therefore no additional money was lost from the pot.

At the termination, Sam's and Hillal's names were called first, and the green screen appeared, relieving them both. Kerrie's name was called third, and the screen turned red.

=== Week 7 ===
Week 7 recap
Original airdate: 21 August 2013 Locations: Gold Coast, Queensland
| Assignment | Money earned | Possible earnings |
|---|---|---|
| Beach Run | $5,000 | $5,000 |
| Flag Race | N/A | |
| Mole Minefield | $6,000 | $10,000 |
| School Exams | $11,000 | $12,000 |
| Pot Count | -$3,000 | $0 |
| Current Pot | $101,900 | $348,450 |
Freebies
| Sam and Erin | Earned by crossing the finish line first in the Beach Run assignment | |
Exemptions
| Sam | Earned by grabbing the flag in the final round of the Flag Race assignment | |
Termination
| – | No one faced termination this week | |

Beach Run: The seven remaining players met Shura on a beach on the Gold Coast, where they were to race within a designated track on sand and water. What the players didn't know was that they had a six-minute time limit to complete the assignment, but what they did know was that the first male and first female to cross the finishing line would each receive a freebie. The players were not allowed to be separated by more than ten metres throughout the entire race. If every player completed the course, then $5,000 would be won for the pot, but if even one person failed to cross the finish line within the time limit, then nothing would be won. Sam and Erin were the first players of their respective genders to cross the finish line, thus winning a freebie each. Despite some tension between Hillal and Shaun, the players narrowly succeeded in completing the assignment within the time limit, thus winning $5,000.

Flag Race: Over three rounds, the players were divided into two groups and were to face each other and race from one side of the field to another to grab a flag. If any player got caught, then they would be ruled out of contention for the exemption. At the start of round three, only Hillal and Sam remained, and in the end it was Sam who grabbed the flag first and thus won an exemption for the seventh quiz.

Mole Minefield: The players encountered a 5 × 5 coal minefield on a beach, of which $2,000 cash was buried in five of the squares. They only had ten chances to find the money. If they dug up a square which contained a bomb, then any money won to that point would be forfeited for the assignment and their total would reset to zero. The team managed to dig up $6,000, thus winning that amount of money towards the pot.

School Exams: The players were taken to Broadbeach State School, where they were to answer up to twelve questions across four subjects: English, geography, mathematics and music. Each subject contained three questions each, if answered correctly, would earn $1,000 for the pot. Whichever question the first team would attempt in a specific room, the second team would have the other two questions to choose from. If any question was answered incorrectly, then one player from that team would have to be left behind on detention, no money would be won for that incorrectly answered question and that player would take no further part in the assignment. The two teams answered every question correctly, except for one in the Geography room, thus winning $11,000 for the pot.

Pot Count: Following Kerrie's termination in the previous week, Nick was voted by the group as the new treasurer of the team. He, along with Shaun and Erin, counted up the money that had been won up to this point of the game thus far, and discovered that $3,000 had gone missing. Nick then alleged that Aisha had kept the $3,000 that was won in the Envelope Temptation assignment in Week 5, an allegation that Aisha vigorously denied.

=== Week 8 ===
Week 8 recap
Original airdate: 28 August 2013 Locations: Gold Coast, Queensland
| Assignment | Money earned | Possible earnings |
|---|---|---|
| Let it Ride | $8,000 | Unknown |
| Ultimate Memory | $0 | $10,000 |
| Multilayer Maps | $20,000 | $20,000 |
| Current Pot | $129,900 | $378,450 |
Exemptions
| Hillal | Beat the runners and matched the most pair of cards in the Ultimate Memory assignment | |
| – | Nick and Erin both lost their exemptions in the Ultimate Memory assignment | |
Termination
| – | No one faced termination this week | |

Let it Ride: One by one, the players were interrogated by Shura and each were dealt a series of cards, ranging from money for the pot to exemptions for specific quizzes. If the players were dealt a card which contained a dollar sign on it, then they would win $2,000 for the pot, but if they drew a card which a red thumbprint on it, then their game would be over and whatever they were already dealt would be lost. The players could opt out at any time in the game. Hillal, Nick, and Sam won money for the pot, whilst Erin earned herself two further exemptions, however, the games of Aisha, Ally and Shaun were terminated, meaning they all won nothing. Aisha originally won $4,000 during her go, but drew a red thumbprint almost immediately, thus losing that amount from the pot.

Ultimate Memory: As the three players holding exemptions at the time, Erin, Hillal, and Nick would have to play a game of memory cards, with the first player to successfully match eight pairs keeping their exemption. The time limit in which they had to complete the assignment were controlled by the other four players, who were given an unlimited time limit to unfurl nine flags from a nearby hotel, which would read "GAME OVER" vertically when seen from where Erin, Hillal and Nick were. If the team unfurling the nine flags succeeded, then $10,000 would be won and no-one would win an exemption. In the end, Hillal was the first player to successfully match eight pairs, thus retaining his exemption and keeping $10,000 from being won.

After this assignment, Nick re-counted the pot on his own, and the $3,000 which had originally gone missing mysteriously re-appeared. Using this to his advantage, he decided to plant the money into Hillal's toiletry bag, in a bid to "create more tension".

Multilayer Maps: As the player with the best navigation skills, Shaun was isolated from the group and was taken to a specified place within the Gold Coast's canals. The other six players were split into pairs, with each team controlling a boat. Each pair began at a different starting point in the canals and were tasked to find Shaun before returning to the gazebo. Shaun would have to verbally direct the players towards him in order to be transported to the finishing point. Each boat also contained one layer of a map where if all three layers were combined, a map of the canal as well as Shaun's position would be form. If this assignment was completed within 90 minutes, then $20,000 would be won, but if any of the boats failed, then nothing would be won. Although Sam and Nick got lost in the final minutes of the assignment, the team succeeded and won $20,000.

=== Week 9 ===
Week 9 recap
Original airdate: 4 September 2013 Locations: Gold Coast, Queensland
| Assignment | Money earned | Possible earnings |
|---|---|---|
| Pot Count | $3,000 | $0 |
| Silent Auction | –$125,000 | $9,500 |
| Snorkel Challenge | $0 | $10,000 |
| Current Pot | $7,900 | $397,950 |
Exemptions
| Sam | Bid $70,000 for "the ultimate exemption" in the Silent Auction assignment | |
Freebies
| Hillal, Ally and Sam | Bid the maximum amounts for the freebies in the Silent Auction assignment | |
Termination
| – | No one faced termination this week | |

Pot Count: At the end of the previous episode, Hillal found the $3,000 which had been planted in his toiletry bag by Nick. He and Sam demanded a group meeting, during which Shaun was accused of putting the money in Hillal's room. Nick, for his part, acted as if he did not know what was going on, as Hillal and Shaun engaged in an argument. This $3,000 was added to the pot, taking the total to $132,900.

Silent Auction: The seven players were given the opportunity to bid on certain items ranging from $10,000 for the pot to "the ultimate exemption" – that is, a special exemption which would take the player who successfully bid it straight through to the final four. The players were placed in individual booths to ensure that bids remained anonymous. For each of the items that were to be sold, there was a certain minimum and maximum bid that had to be made. Bidding for each item was not compulsory. Players only had one minute to make bids, after which the items would be sold to the highest bidder (or, in the event of a tie, the quickest). In the end, the maximum bids for each item that was sold were made, resulting in the most money ever lost in a single assignment in the history of The Mole worldwide. Sam bid $70,000 for "the ultimate exemption", in addition to $25,000 for a Quiz 8 exemption – this guaranteeing his place in the final four and not having to sit the next three quizzes. Additionally, he would not have to defend that exemption. It was revealed that the group had spent $135,000 in the auction, however, a $10,000 bid was made for a mystery envelope, its contents of which contained $10,000, so therefore, $125,000 was lost from the pot.

Snorkel Challenge: The players were split into three pairs and asked to swim through a bay full of 60 sharks, whilst trying to find seven photographs on the sea floor which depicted relatives of the seven remaining players still in the game. Each pair would take an attempt at swimming through the bay and identify the images in numerical order from one to seven. Once they made it back to dry land, they would be asked to place an image of the players to which they think matched their relatives. Meanwhile, Nick was isolated from the group and was asked to try to identify what the players were doing based on the other players commentary. He was then later tasked with matching the relatives to the players based on his hunch. One by one, the question marked cards were flipped over to reveal five correct answers, but cards three and six were wrongly matched, meaning nothing was won in this assignment.

=== Week 10 ===
Week 10 recap
Original airdate: 11 September 2013 Locations: Thirlmere, New South Wales Couridjah, New South Wales Bellambi, New South Wales
| Assignment | Money earned | Possible earnings |
Ally's termination
| Exemption Refund | $45,000 | $45,000 |
| Train Trivia | $9,000 | $15,000 |
| Walking on Water | $100 | $5,100 |
| Current Pot | $62,000 | $463,050 |
Termination
| Ally | 6th player terminated | |

Exemption Refund: Following Ally's termination, Sam and Hillal, as the two players who were holding exemptions at the time, were both offered the chance to return their exemptions to Shura for $15,000 each, but there was a catch – they had to either refund all three of their exemptions, or keep them all without selling any exemptions. Both Hillal and Sam gave back their exemptions, though the latter was allowed to keep his ultimate exemption, thus adding $45,000 to the pot.

Train Trivia: Erin and Shaun were chosen as two players who were "forward thinkers". They were isolated from the group, and given a series of questions and answers from which they had to memorise. They were then to travel ahead of the train on a kalamazoo which was to be controlled by their muscles, for four kilometres. They were also allowed to place up to ten answers on signs along the track for questions they thought the remaining contestants may struggle with. The other four players, meanwhile, were to ride the train and answer twenty general knowledge questions. Each correct answer would be worth $500 to the pot, with an additional $5,000 attached if they could answer all twenty questions correctly, meaning a potential of $15,000 to be won in this assignment. From the twenty questions, they answered all but two questions correctly, thus winning $9,000 and missing out on the bonus $5,000.

Walking on Water: The players were taken to a beach-side swimming pool, where a series of floating platforms were set up, labelled with the number of players able to stand on it at once. The players would have to cross these platforms by using planks of varying lengths to reach the final platform. They would have only twenty minutes to have each player standing on the final platform, in order to win $5,000 for the pot. There was also a mystery box located near final platform, containing unknown items. The group could decide whether to spend time accessing the box or not, however, only one player would open the box and keep the contents for themselves. Aisha was nominated to open the mystery box, which contained $100 and a hidden question for Quiz Seven. Eventually, the group reached the final platform with two seconds to spare. However, several players were revealed to have stepped on a plank while someone else was on it; therefore, the $5,000 that was on offer was revoked. The $100 that was found in the mystery box was unaffected, meaning only that amount was added to the pot.

=== Week 11 ===
Week 11 recap
Original airdate: 18 September 2013 Locations: Kiama, New South Wales
| Assignment | Money earned | Possible earnings |
|---|---|---|
| Writing With Jeeps | $0 | $5,000 |
| Town Trek | $0 | $5,000 |
| Current Pot | $62,000 | $473,050 |
Termination
| – | No one faced termination this week | |

Writing with Jeeps: Erin and Hillal were picked as the two players with the best handwriting from the team. They would be tasked with navigating the rest of the team, who were split into pairs (Aisha/Sam, directed by Erin and Nick/Shaun, directed by Hillal) and tasked with attempting to spell a given word out by driving the cars within a quarry. The two pairs driving the cars had a time limit of 20 minutes in which to spell the word out, which was known only to Erin and Hillal. In the end, the two pairs who were driving the cars deciphered the word as being "WAR", however, the answer was "LIAR", meaning no money was won in this assignment.

Town Trek: The six players were met with a board of Australia, which was divided into pieces resembling each state, and were given one hour to run down the Kiama Coastal Walk to a flag at the end of the path. The players were not informed what to do in relation to the boards; they were only instructed to take the state-shaped parts of the board on the walk towards the flag. Only when they found a clue along the path were the instructions made clear in regards to the assignment – the first clue instructed them to list all the cities and towns in Western Australia and the Northern Territory, the second instructed them to list all those in Victoria and Tasmania, the third for the state of New South Wales and the Australian Capital Territory, the fourth for South Australia and the fifth for Queensland. Upon arrival at the finish line, Shura revealed that the team would only win $5,000 if they could correctly guess whether they had less, or more than 175 correct towns on the board. The players guessed that they had less, but they actually wrote 187 correct towns on the map, so therefore, nothing was won in this assignment.

=== Week 12 ===
Week 12 recap
Original airdate: 25 September 2013 Locations: Kiama, New South Wales
| Assignment | Money earned | Possible earnings |
|---|---|---|
| Mole Network | $15,000 | $50,000 |
| Catapult | $30,500 | $360,000 |
| Current Pot | $107,500 | $883,050 |
Termination
| Nick | 7th player terminated | |

Mole Network: The six players were faced with a high crane and a cherry-picker attached to it, the latter of which was located 30 metres off the ground. Each player was to enter the cherry-picker on the crane and jump off it, trying to cling onto a large net in the process. Upon jumping onto the net, they would have to aim for pockets of cash that were located on it; the higher the cash was placed on the net, the higher the value. Hillal earned the team $10,000 in his attempt, Shaun earned the team $5,000 despite having his leg caught in the net, Erin failed to win the team any money even though she did jump, and Nick, Sam and Aisha all refused to even attempt the challenge. Altogether, the team managed to win only $15,000 out of the $50,000 that was offered.

Catapult: The players were split into two groups: Aisha, Hillal and Shaun were tasked with sling-shooting balls into particular zones marked by particular amounts of money within an arc, where they were to be caught by Erin, Nick and Sam. There were also some "dead zones", which, if the ball was caught within those zones by the catchers, would deduct money from the pot. However, to win the money, the catchers would have to catch the ball on the full (that is, without the ball bouncing on the field), to win that amount of money. The catching team managed to catch eleven balls, thus winning $10,000 for the pot. After this round, the players would swap roles; that is, the slingers would catch the balls whilst the catchers would be the ones slinging the balls from the ground. In the second round, the team earned $20,500, thus raising the total money in this challenge won up to $30,500.

=== Week 13 ===
Week 13 recap
Original airdate: 2 October 2013 Locations: Wattamolla, New South Wales Mosman, New South Wales
| Assignment | Money earned | Possible earnings |
|---|---|---|
| Cash Waterfall | $5,000 | $35,000 |
| Mole Bowls | $2,000 | $25,000 |
| Current Pot | $114,500 | $943,050 |
Termination
| Shaun | 8th player terminated | |

Cash Waterfall: Aisha, Hillal and Sam were appointed as the controllers of this assignment, whilst Erin was appointed the co-ordinator and Shaun the one responsible for trying to win the money. The three controllers would be responsible for directing Shaun on a rope, where there were several cases containing cash. Erin would have to direct Shaun, who, attached to the rope, would try to unhook several cases of cash, and drop them into the water. Erin would then have to collect the cash in the water, and bring them to a table on dry land within 30 minutes, to win the money. Shaun only managed to retrieve three of the six money boxes, which contained $15,000. However, it was revealed that there were ten rule breaches, each rule breach costing the team $1,000. Therefore, only $5,000 was won in this assignment. Hillal was then elected as the team's new treasurer after Nick was terminated in the previous quiz.

Mole Bowls: The players were taken to a bowling club, where they were to bowl their balls to within a designated circle marked in the middle of a green. Each player would only get one shot to win the money. If the players were able to bowl their balls to within the marked circle, they would win $5,000 for the pot, however, any balls that were knocked out of the circle would render that $5,000 invalid. Whichever player bowled their ball closest to the jack in the centre of the circle would earn themselves a hidden question, and also get to capture the Mole diaries of each of the other players remaining in the game. As Sam had the "ultimate exemption", he elected to bowl first, and he bowled his ball just inside the circle, earning $5,000. Aisha went next, but didn't make a decent effort, whilst Shaun just missed the circle on his go and Erin and Hillal both overshot the circle, meaning only $5,000 was won. The players were given a second chance to bowl their balls again, but if they did so, it would cost $1,000 for each person who elected to bowl again. Erin, Hillal and Shaun all elected to bowl again, costing the team $3,000. Erin's ball stopped closest to the jack, but even so did not win any money for the pot, as the second shot did not count towards the pot. Therefore, only $2,000 was won in this assignment.

=== Week 14 ===
Week 14 recap
Original airdate: 9 October 2013 Locations: Camden, New South Wales Sydney Town Hall
| Assignment | Money earned | Possible earnings |
|---|---|---|
| Freebie Refund | $20,000 | $25,000 |
| Hourglass Maze | $15,000 | $30,000 |
| Go Mole | N/A | N/A |
| Current Pot | $149,500 | $998,050 |
Termination
| Sam | 9th player terminated | |

Freebie Refund: As the treasurer in the team, Hillal was extracted from the group and Shura made a deal with him that if all the remaining five freebies were returned to him, then $20,000 would be added to the pot, or the freebies would be rendered redundant. It was revealed that Sam had held the remaining four freebies, while the one that Hillal held went missing, so he relunctantly refunded them, for $5,000 each, therefore adding the money to the pot.

Hourglass Maze: Aisha was tasked with entering a maze and attempting to find an hourglass in the middle of it, and exiting the maze at a particular exit point. After she did so, in five minutes and 11 seconds, she was then instructed to guide the other three players through the maze, where they would try to retrieve an envelope, where the hourglass was originally located, before being able to make it out of the maze. They would have to make it out of the maze with the envelope before the hourglass ran out (two minutes and 30 seconds) in order for the money to be counted. Hillal and Erin were both able to retrieve an envelope each in their runs through the maze, but neither made it out in time, so theirs did not count. However, Sam was able to retrieve his envelope and made it out of the maze with 30 seconds to spare. The envelopes were opened to reveal $5,000, $10,000 and $15,000 respectively. Since only Sam's envelope counted, $15,000 was added to the pot.

Go Mole: The players were dealt a certain number of cards, with the objective of the game being that if they achieved a four of a kind with their own name, they win the game immediately (i.e. if Sam drew a 'four of a kind' with his name, then he immediately wins the game) and be given a 30-second advantage on the rest of the players in the subsequent quiz. Each player would ask the person next to them if they had a card with a specific name, and if they did, then they would receive that card, whereas if they didn't, the recipient would have to say "Go Mole", the asker would have to deal a new card from the pile, and play moves onto the next player. Erin was eliminated from the game after Sam drew a four of a kind of her. Hillal eventually ended up winning the game by drawing a 'four of a kind' of himself, and as a reward was given a 30-second advantage on the remainder of the players in the upcoming quiz.

Hillal's name was called first, and the green screen appeared, relieving him. Sam's name was called second, and the screen turned red.

=== Week 15 ===
Week 15 recap
Original airdate: 16 October 2013 Locations: Cronulla sand dunes, New South Wales Sydney, New South Wales Kurnell, New South Wales Birchgrove, New South Wales
| Assignment | Money earned | Possible earnings |
|---|---|---|
| Mole Snapshot | $30,500 | $50,000 |
| Interrogation | N/A | N/A |
| Final Quiz | N/A | N/A |
| Final Pot | $180,000 | $1,048,050 |
The reveal
| Aisha | The runner-up | |
| Hillal | The winner of $180,000 | |
| Erin | The Mole | |

Mole Snapshot: This assignment saw all twelve players reunited. The entire group, including the nine terminated players, were shown a photo of the group from the very beginning of the game, however, only the final three were allowed to look at it very closely, as their assignment would be to position the players and dress them up as they originally appeared in the photo, within a time limit of 15 minutes. Hillal, the group's treasurer, was given the $50,000 to start off with. For any piece of clothing that was incorrect, or if any player was incorrectly positioned in the resembled piece, then $5,000 would be taken off. At the end, four mistakes were revealed: Nick was incorrectly positioned, Linda's denim shorts were wrong, Shaun was wearing the wrong shirt and Hillal's left foot was stepped forward when it was his right that was shown in the original photo, therefore, $20,000 was taken off the original $50,000 winnings. As a bonus, $500 was added to the end to round up the pot to $180,000, making for the second-highest total prize money in the history of the Australian version of The Mole.

Interrogation: The final three players met up with Shura on top of a building in Sydney, where they were to be interrogated about each other's actions throughout the game. The players were to be hooked up to a lie detector test, which would track their nerves, actions and moves. The three players were allowed to ask anything they could from four questions, including the ultimate question: "Who is the Mole?". The results revealed that Aisha answered only three questions incorrectly with 96% accuracy, Erin answered two questions incorrectly with 96% accuracy and Hillal answered only half of his questions correctly, also with 96% accuracy.

Final Quiz: The three players were faced with their final quiz. This final quiz was unlike any other in the history of the Australian version of The Mole: the first ten questions would be answered using their Samsung Galaxy Tablets, whilst the final 30 questions would be answered in the normal conditions. After each answered the first question asked by Shura, they would then face each of the nine terminated players, in the order in which they left the game, to answer the next nine questions, each relating to an assignment which corresponded to their termination (for example, Linda was shown with a few boxes from the Path to Temptation assignment and Shaun was seen with the balls and jack from the Mole Bowls assignment) before moving on to the traditional part of the quiz. The results revealed Erin to be the Mole, Aisha the runner-up and Hillal the winner. Both Aisha and Hillal had suspected Erin of being the Mole, however, Hillal won as he answered 36 questions correctly to Aisha's 31.

== Mole activity ==
=== Sabotage ===
The following acts of sabotage were revealed in the final episode:

The Drop Off: During the desert trek, Erin wasted time in the discussion about leaving bags behind, and pushed for some of them to be left behind.

High Wire Relay: Erin purposely fell off the high wire as she attempted to pass the baton to Linda.

Speed Reader: Erin pressed for the use of the letter 'o', knowing that the players would not be able to identify any items with that letter. Additionally, after spilling the paint, she decided to cover the letter 'o', trying to form an orange out of it. She also wrote the letter 'e' in lower case, making it difficult for the team on the speed boat to distinguish from letters with a similar shape (an upper case 'E' would have been far more distinctive).

Down The Line: Erin knew that her suitcase ("Katherine") was the correct one. She positioned herself away from the train and made sure she did not board the tram. This resulted in the loss of $10,000.

Beat the Mole: Erin cost the team $12,000 because she already knew information about the contestants.

Domino Effect: Erin elected to keep her exemption following this assignment by paying $15,000 from the pot.

Mole Network: Erin jumped towards the net but only touched the base of it and avoided catching any money bags attached higher up the net.

Cash Waterfall: Erin feigned fatigue in the canoe and gave sporadic, incomplete directions to Aisha to relay to Sam and Hillal. This goaded Shaun and Aisha into illegally giving directions, costing penalties.

Town Trek: Erin purposely wrote some towns in a large font, taking up valuable space on the board and contributing to the loss of $5,000.

Steps: Erin gave the wrong answer when standing on one of the steps in the challenge.

Catapult: Erin's deliberately bad catching was exposed in this assignment.

Mole Bowls: Erin spent $1,000 from the pot to have a second attempt at bowling, also knowing that no further money would be won in this assignment.

Others: Erin spent money whenever possible, and put herself in a position of control in many challenges.

The following acts of sabotage were spotted during the series, but not mentioned in the final episode:

School Exams: Erin pushed for a wrong answer in the Geography room, knowing that China was the most populated country in the world but answering India instead, leaving Hillal behind on detention.

Walking on Water: Erin stepped on the plank while Shaun was still walking on it, thus breaching the rules and preventing $5,000 from being won.

Writing With Jeeps: Erin avoided correctly identifying the word to be written and gave delayed and poor instructions to the team in her jeep.

Beach Run: As the fastest female to cross the line Erin won an Exemption which as the Mole she didn't need but it kept other players from benefiting from it.

Aeroplane Acrobatics Challenge: (unintentional) Erin had intended to give a poor description of the acrobatics but she inadvertently screamed in terror so loudly that the communication channel cut out for the remainder of the flight.

Silent Auction: Erin made middling bids on each item, ensuring that a substantial amount of money would be lost. Her teammates' greed ensured that it would be a catastrophic loss, and helped shift some suspicion off her.

Hourglass Maze: Erin purposely misheard some directions that were given to her by Aisha in the maze.

Mole Snapshot: Erin positioned Nick in the wrong position, placing him between Alex and Mozzie when he was supposed to be placed between Mozzie and Seble. Additionally, she wasted time trying to find Nick's clothes.

=== Clues ===
The following clues were revealed in the final episode:

Clues for Contestants: There were three things Erin made sure to tell other contestants: firstly, she was from Geelong, secondly, she lived in the postcode area 3216, and thirdly, she had previously worked for the Geelong Football Club.

Opening Titles: There were three clues in the opening titles of every episode: firstly, Erin's background is noticeably different from that of the others; her background is the desert, whereas the others' were city-based backgrounds, secondly, she is the fourth player to be shown in the opening titles; her name has four letters, and the word "Mole" also has four letters, and thirdly, immediately after Erin is shown, the word "UNDERMINE" flashes, with her name hidden in the word.

The Drop Off: Erin is the player whose voice is heard, and who is seen, for the first time in the game.

School Exams: The Gaelic word for Ireland is "Erin".

Down The Line: Her name is hidden in the town named on her suitcase "KathERINe".

Smoke Signals: The code that was to be interpreted was 2163, which if you move the last digit to the front becomes 3216, the postcode of Geelong, Erin's hometown.

Scales of Justice: The scales diagram that the players were to form out of the varying lengths of timber was a reference to Erin's past occupation, a law student.

Owl: Erin's favourite animal is the owl and she sometimes wore owl earrings. The word "owl" was seen on a sign in the Train Trivia assignment.

Clothing: Erin would often wear "mole green".

Club Colours: Erin is from Geelong, and there were many items in the game including serviettes and confetti that were navy blue and white, the official club colours of the Geelong Football Club).

The following clues were spotted during the series, but not mentioned in the final episode:

Name: Erin's first name is fourth alphabetically, in addition to her being shown fourth in the opening credits, her name having four letters and the word "mole" having four letters.

Assignments in Geelong: Some assignments in the first half of the game were held in Geelong, Erin's hometown. In the Hostage Rescue assignment, she appears to be the hero, her knowledge of the area where the team started being what won the assignment for the team in the first place.

Quiz Seven Termination: Erin sarcastically answered "yes" to Shaun asking whether she was the Mole during the 7th termination, saying "there you go, there's the answer". But what appeared to be a sarcastic joke, was actually the truth.
