= Peter Schwab =

Australian rules footballer, born 1960

Personal information
- Nickname: Schwabby
- Born: 22 September 1960 (age 66)
- Original team: Bennettswood
- Height: 180 cm (5 ft 11 in)
- Weight: 83 kg (183 lb)

Playing career^{1}
Years	Club	Games (Goals)
1980–1991	Hawthorn	171 (38)

Coaching career^{3}
Years	Club	Games (W–L–D)
2000–2004	Hawthorn	104 (49–55–0)
- ^{1} Playing statistics correct to the end of 1991.^{3} Coaching statistics correct as of 2004.

Career highlights
- Hawthorn premiership player 1983, 1986, 1988

Peter Schwab (born 22 September 1960) is a former Australian rules footballer and coach who also became the Umpiring Director for the AFL.

== Playing career ==
=== Hawthorn ===
Recruited from Bennettswood Football Club, Schwab played with Hawthorn Football Club from 1980 to 1991. He played 171 games and scored 38 goals. Schwab was used mainly as a utility. Schwab was also part of the 1983, 1986 and 1988 flags with Hawthorn.

=== 1989 Grand Final suspension ===
Schwab missed Hawthorn's 1989 VFL Grand Final victory after he was suspended for striking Essendon's Andrew Manning.

== Coaching career ==
=== Richmond Football Club assistant coach (1992–1995) ===
In 1992, Schwab became assistant coach at the Richmond Football Club.

=== Hawthorn Football Club assistant coach (1996–1997) ===
Schwab returned to Hawthorn as assistant coach under senior coach Ken Judge in 1996 and 1997.

=== AFL Umpiring Department (1998–1999) ===
Schwab then managed the AFL Umpiring Department for two years.

=== Hawthorn Football Club senior coach (2000–2004) ===
Schwab became Hawthorn's senior coach for five seasons from 2000, when Schwab replaced Ken Judge, who resigned as Hawthorn Football Club senior coach at the end the 1999 season. He took Hawthorn into the finals in his first year. They eliminated Geelong in the first elimination final, but the following week they were eliminated by Kangaroos in the semi-final. He took the Hawks to the finals again in 2001, where they eliminated Sydney in the elimination final and they eliminated Port Adelaide in the semi-final. They eventually lost to Essendon in a thriller at the MCG in the Preliminary Finals. Also during the 2001 season, Schwab took a leave of absence for one game, after Schwab was first diagnosed with a benign arrhythmia of the heart. Assistant coach Chris Connolly then took over as interim senior coach in the absence of Schwab, for the Round 17, 2001 against Carlton, and Hawthorn won this game, with Ben Dixon kicking the winning goal after the siren. In 2002 and 2003, Hawthorn under Schwab just missed out of the finals, finishing 10th and 9th.

In the 2004 season, Schwab announced during the pre-season that the Hawks would win the premiership; however, by Round 16, 2004, the Hawks under Schwab sat in the last position on the ladder with two wins and fourteen losses, and there was pressure on Schwab to resign. Schwab then announced he would step down at the end of the 2004 season. However, after one more game, the Hawks under Schwab were thrashed by the Kangaroos by a margin of 80 points in Round 17, 2004, and he resigned immediately, citing it was too hard to continue. Schwab was replaced by assistant coach Donald McDonald, who became caretaker senior coach of the Hawthorn Football Club for the remainder of the 2004 season.

Years later, in 2022, Schwab reflected on his resignation as senior coach of Hawthorn in the Herald Sun and stated: "Once the 2004 season started, things started to spiral down, we had some personnel issues, but there were reasons why we were so poor, but failure accepts no alibis, so it kept coming and we weren’t getting any better. If anything we were getting worse", and "I wasn’t right and the players weren’t right".

=== Post AFL senior coaching roles ===
He also coached Australian rules football at prominent Melbourne School Wesley College, Melbourne, for a number of years from 2006. He currently works for De La Salle College, Malvern, as of 2018.

== Head coaching record ==
Team	Year	Home and Away Season					Finals			
Team	Year	Won	Lost	Drew	%	Position	Won	Lost	Win %	Result
HAW	2000	12	10	0	.545	8th out of 16	1	1	.500	Lost to North Melbourne in Semi Final
HAW	2001	12 (Note: Chris Connolly served as interim coach for Hawthorn's Round 17 game against Carlton.)	9	0	.571	6th out of 16	2	1	.667	Lost to Essendon in Preliminary Final
HAW	2002	11	11	0	.500	10th out of 16	—	—	—	—
HAW	2003	12	10	0	.545	9th out of 16	—	—	—	—
HAW	2004	2 (Note: Schwab resigned following round 17 with a record of 2-15 and Donald McDonald took over as interim head coach.)	15	0	.118	(resigned after R17)	—	—	—	—
Total		49	55	0	.471		3	2	.600	

== Other football roles ==
- Marketing Manager at Hawthorn Football Club
- Head of the AFL umpiring panel. 2016 to 2017
- Chairman of the AFL Match Review Panel. 2005 to 2007
- Chief Executive Officer of AFL Victoria. April 2007 – November 2010
- "Special comments" contributor for ABC radio and writer for The Age
- AFL Director of Coaching 2010 to October 2013

== Brisbane Lions ==
In November 2013, Schwab took up the role of Senior Director of Coaching and Development at Brisbane Lions. In this role, Schwab oversaw the management of the coaching staff and provided support to Senior Coach, Justin Leppitsch. Schwab left the Brisbane Lions Football Club on 1 December 2016 to accept the role as the AFL's national umpiring director.

== AFL’s national umpiring director ==
Schwab then took up the role of AFL's national umpiring director on 1 December 2016, until he was sacked from the position on 14 November 2017 after serving in the role for one year.

== Awards ==
- Life member of the Hawthorn Football Club 1988
- Life member of the AFL

== Personal life ==
Schwab went to Burwood High School and completed a Bachelor of Education (B.Ed.), Physical education at university. Schwab was a PE teacher at St Michael's Grammar School
