= Shura Taft =

Australian presenter

- Born: 8 November 1982 (age 43); London, UK
- Education: Wesley College, Monash University
- Occupations: Television presenter and radio host
- Years active: 2006–present

Shura Taft is an English-born Australian television and radio presenter.

== Early life and education ==
Taft grew up in Melbourne and attended Wesley College before going on to study biomedical science at university.

== Career ==
=== Television ===
Taft co‑hosted the Nine Network’s children’s program Kids' WB from 2006 to 2011 and later fronted the game show Pyramid between 2009 and 2012. He also contributed stories to the travel series Postcards . In 2008, he appeared as a contestant on Celebrity Singing Bee, and in 2010 he represented Victoria in the EJ Whitten Legends Game, wearing number 9.

In 2011, Taft became host of the music program Eclipse Music TV on GO!, followed in 2012 by hosting duties on The Supercoach Show for Fox Footy.

He went on to host the sixth season of the Australian version of The Mole in 2013 and later that year filled in for Larry Emdur on The Morning Show.

In 2017, Taft joined the Seven Network’s coverage of the Australian Open, where he regularly appeared among the crowd interviewing spectators and helping build the atmosphere before player entrances.

=== Radio ===
Taft worked as a radio presenter on Nova 100 early in his career.

In 2014, he joined the Hit Network’s Weekend Breakfast as anchor and also became a casual presenter on Triple M Melbourne.

== Personal life ==
He is a supporter of the Hawthorn Football Club and has played amateur football for Collegians in the Victorian Amateur Football Association, winning premier division premierships in 2011 and 2012.

He also has Jewish heritage.
