= Alex Jesaulenko Medal =

The Alex Jesaulenko Medal refers to three unrelated medals in Australian rules football, all named in honour of Alex Jesaulenko, a legend in the Australian Football Hall of Fame. The medals are currently awarded annually to the best player in the grand final of the AFL Canberra league and to the winner of the Mark of the Year in the Australian Football League. In the 1990s a medal of the same name was awarded to the best player for The Allies representative team in State Of Origin football.

== AFL Canberra ==
Jesaulenko started his football career with the Eastlake Football Club in the Canberra Australian National Football League. In recognition of his achievements in the VFL the league awards the Alex Jesaulenko Medal to the best player in the Grand Final each year. In 2008 the award was won by Nicholas Smith.

== Mark of the Year ==
In recent years, the AFL has awarded the Alex Jesaulenko Medal to the winner of the Mark of the Year in recognition of Jesaulenko's famous mark in the 1970 VFL Grand Final, one of the most recognisable spectacular marks of all time.

== State of Origin ==
In State of Origin football, the medal was awarded to the best player on the ground for The Allies representative team. It was only awarded from 1995 to 1998, when The Allies team, consisting of players not from the major football states of Victoria, South Australia and Western Australia. It honoured Jesaulenko's Canberra origins being outside of the major Australian football states and hence would have qualified to play for The Allies had the concept existed during his career.

=== Winners ===
- 1995 – Ryan O'Connor
- 1996 – Matthew Richardson
- 1997 – Nathan Buckley
- 1998 – Shane Crawford
