= 1999 Brownlow Medal =

- Location: Sydney, Australia
- Winner: Shane Crawford (Hawthorn); 28 votes

Television/radio coverage
- Network: Seven Network

The 1999 Brownlow Medal was the 72nd year the award was presented to the player adjudged the fairest and best player during the Australian Football League (AFL) home-and-away season. Shane Crawford of the Hawthorn Football Club won the medal by polling twenty-eight votes during the 1999 AFL season.

The count was notable in that it was the first time since the award's inception in 1924 that it was held outside Melbourne.

== Leading vote-getters ==
	Player	Votes
1st	Shane Crawford (Hawthorn)	28
2nd	Mark Mercuri (Essendon)	22
=3rd	Matthew Allan (Carlton)	20
=3rd	Nathan Buckley (Collingwood)	20
5th	Wayne Schwass (Sydney)	19
6th	Craig Bradley (Carlton)	18
7th	Matthew Richardson (Richmond)	16
=8th	Adrian Fletcher (Fremantle)	15
=8th	Ben Cousins (West Coast)	15
10th	Scott West (Western Bulldogs)	14
