= Donald McDonald (footballer) =

Australian rules footballer, born 1962

Personal information
- Full name: Donald McDonald
- Born: 10 May 1962 (age 64)
- Original team: St. Brendan's
- Height: 191 cm (6 ft 3 in)
- Weight: 97 kg (214 lb)
- Positions: Ruck, key position

Playing career^{1}
Years	Club	Games (Goals)
1982–1992	North Melbourne	155 (165)
1993-1995	Werribee	46 (98)
Total		201 (263)

Coaching career^{3}
Years	Club	Games (W–L–D)
2004	Hawthorn	5 (2–3–0)
- ^{1} Playing statistics correct to the end of 1992.^{3} Coaching statistics correct as of 2004.

Career highlights
- Playing: North Melbourne leading goal kicker: 1984; VFA premiership player: 1993; Coaching: VFL premiership coach: 2001

Donald McDonald (born 10 May 1962) is a former Australian rules footballer and coach.

== Playing career ==
=== North Melbourne Football Club ===
Recruited from St. Brendan's in Flemington, McDonald debuted with the North Melbourne Football Club in the VFL(now AFL) in 1982. He was a tall player who could play key position or in the ruck, and in 1984 won the Kangaroos' leading goalkicker award. He played in the VFL until 1992, having amassed 155 games and 165 goals.

== Coaching career ==
=== Early career ===
McDonald became captain-coach of Werribee in the VFA, and coached the club to a premiership victory in 1993. He coached at Werribee from 1993 until 1999.

From 2000 to 2002 he was non-playing coach of the Box Hill Hawks in the VFL, and coached the club to a premiership victory in 2001, defeating his former club Werribee in the grand final.

=== Hawthorn Football Club ===
In the 2004 season, McDonald took over from Peter Schwab, after Schwab resigned from the Hawthorn Football Club senior coaching job late in the season following a dismal season. McDonald was then promoted from assistant coach to caretaker senior coach of Hawthorn for the remainder of the 2004 season. Hawthorn under McDonald won two games of the remaining five games of the 2004 season, to finish in fifteenth place on the ladder, which was the second-last placed position. McDonald was however not retained as Hawthorn Football Club senior coach at the end of the 2004 season and was replaced by Alastair Clarkson as Hawthorn Football Club senior coach.

=== North Melbourne Football Club assistant coach and other roles with the club ===
McDonald then became an assistant coach at his old club, North Melbourne Kangaroos, for the 2005 season and then he transitioned to work in a number of key roles at the club, including as the Football Manager. McDonald's son Luke was drafted by North Melbourne as a father-son recruit in 2013 National Draft with 8th pick.

=== Other coaching roles ===
McDonald went on to be the senior coach of the Avondale Heights Football Club who compete in the top division of the Essendon Region Football League. After this, McDonald was appointed as the club's Football Director of The Old Scotch Football Club.
