= Shane Crawford =

Australian rules footballer (born 1974)

- Crawford in 2015

Personal information
- Full name: Shane Barry Crawford
- Born: 9 September 1974 (age 52); Mount Barker, South Australia
- Original team: Finley(NSW)/Assumption College
- Draft: No. 13, 1991 national draft
- Debut: Round 1, 1993, Hawthorn vs. Melbourne, at Waverley Park
- Height: 174 cm (5 ft 9 in)
- Weight: 80 kg (176 lb)
- Position: Midfielder

Playing career^{1}
Years	Club	Games (Goals)
1992–2008	Hawthorn	305 (224)

Representative team honours
Years	Team	Games (Goals)
1993	NSW/ACT	1 (1)
1996–1998	Allies	2 (2)

International team honours
1998–2003	Australia	8 (3)
- ^{1} Playing statistics correct to the end of 2008.

Career highlights
- AFL premiership player: 2008; Brownlow Medal: 1999; AFLPA MVP (Leigh Matthews Trophy): 1999; 4× All-Australian team: 1996, 1998, 1999, 2002; Hawthorn Captain: 1999–2004; 4× Peter Crimmins Memorial Trophy: 1998, 1999, 2002, 2003; Media Association Player of the Year: 1999; Pre-season premiership player: 1999; Alex Jesaulenko Medal: 1998; Australian Football Hall of Fame; Hawthorn Hall of Fame; Australian Sports Medal: 2001

Shane Barry Crawford (born 9 September 1974) is a former Australian rules football player, television media personality and author. He played 305 senior games for the Hawthorn Football Club in the Australian Football League (AFL). During his AFL career he became captain of Hawthorn in 1999 and that season also won the AFL's top individual honours, the Brownlow Medal and the Leigh Matthews Trophy. He is a four-time All-Australian player and played in three International Rules series for Australia. He has won four Hawthorn Best & Fairest Awards and was a member of Hawthorn's 2008 premiership side.

Crawford is currently the head coach with the Ardmona Cats.

== Early life ==
Crawford was born in Mount Barker, South Australia. He spent his childhood in Finley, New South Wales, and played his junior football with the Finley Football Club. While attending boarding school at Assumption College in Kilmore, Victoria, he was selected by Hawthorn with the 13th pick in the 1991 AFL draft before graduating in 1992.

== AFL career ==
He made his AFL debut in 1993. In his first match he kicked a goal and had 19 possessions, including 8 marks. He was nominated for the League's Rising Star award in Round 2 with a stunning 5-goal performance of 23 possessions, including nine marks.

In 1995 and 1996, he was runner-up club champion for Hawthorn and received his first All-Australian selection in 1996. In 1998, he received another All-Australian nod, which earned him a spot in the side to compete against Ireland in the 1998 International Rules series.

He was named captain in 1999; however, he stepped down from the Hawthorn captaincy after the 2004 season in which he broke his arm, and the Hawks finished second-last on the AFL ladder. He regained some form in the 2005 season, during which he played his 250th AFL game against the Brisbane Lions at the Gabba, and he was again one of the league's leading possession-winners.

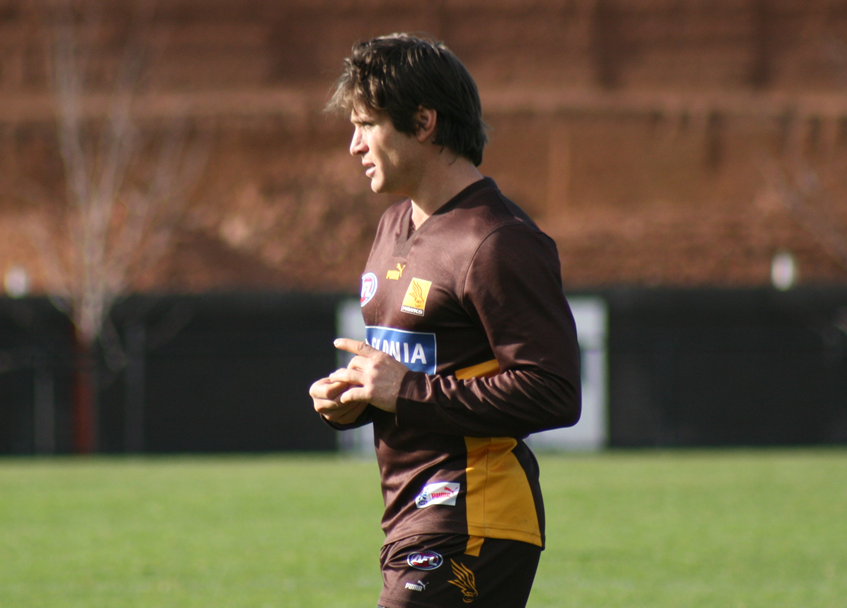
Crawford in 2007

He played his 300th game for Hawthorn against the Brisbane Lions in Round 19 in 2008 in Launceston, where Hawthorn defeated the Lions by 69 points.

On 27 September 2008, Crawford won his first premiership in his 305th AFL match, aged 34. He played more AFL games before receiving his first premiership medal than any other player in the history of the VFL/AFL.

Crawford was offered another year with the Hawks, but he announced his retirement, wanting to go out on a high note. He ended his career after Hawthorn won the 2008 Grand Final and is now remembered as one of the greatest midfielders in the modern era of AFL football.

In 2012, Crawford was inducted in the Australian Football Hall of Fame.

== Media career ==
Crawford was a regular panel member of the sports program The AFL Footy Show (from 2009 until its axing in 2019), a presenter on holiday and destination programs Getaway and Postcards (since 2008), and a presenter on the children's program Kids' WB (from 2014 to 2018).

Crawford caused controversy in 2001 by pulling down Sam Newman's trousers live on-air and exposing his genitalia during a segment on The Footy Show. Despite Crawford being the instigator of the incident and initially fearing he would lose the captaincy at Hawthorn and his future at Channel Nine, it was Newman who bore most of the blame and Crawford escaped much of the criticism.

In 2011, he was a contestant on the first season of Channel 9's series The Celebrity Apprentice, on which celebrities compete for charities of their choosing. Crawford raised $49,311 for his charity, the Breast Cancer Network Australia. He finished third overall, behind dance guru Jason Coleman and actor/comedian Julia Morris.

In 2020, he became a stand-in presenter in the 4th season of Australian Ninja Warrior and was the main sideline presenter in the 2021 season with a guest appearance from tennis player Nick Kyrgios.

In 2022, Crawford made his musical theatre debut in Joseph and the Amazing Technicolor Dreamcoat in Melbourne, playing the role of 'Pharaoh'.

Crawford competed on Channel 7's 2024 season of Dancing With The Stars. He was eliminated in equal-sixth place out of 12 contestants.

In March 2025, it was announced that Crawford would co-host the Seven Network’s House of Wellness alongside Melissa Doyle. Airing every Friday, the show combines discussions, humour, and wellness advice, featuring a dynamic lineup of experts, personalities, and special guests.

=== World records ===
In 2009, Crawford set five Guinness world records during broadcasts of The Footy Show. The records were as follows:

- Having 157 live golden silk orb-weavers on his body inside a large tank for 30 seconds.
- Kissing 96 people on the face in a minute.
- By putting on 180 pairs of underwear, surpassing the former world record of 150.
- Crawford and previous Stawell Gift winner Adrian Mott broke the world record for the 100-metre sprint while both inside a single pantomime horse costume.
- Cracked 90 eggs with his head in a minute.

In 2010, powerlifter Derek Boyer broke the record for the most bench presses of a person (weighing 105 kg or more) in 60 seconds, achieving the feat during the 2010 AFL Grand Final edition of the Footy Show by using Shane Crawford as the weight. At 114 kg, Crawford was well over the minimum weight requirement.

In 2018, he set a world record by putting on 32 swimming goggles in one minute.

== Author ==
In 2010, Crawford released his autobiography, That's What I'm Talking About, written in conjunction with Glenn McFarlane and released in soft-cover and eBook editions. A Junior Edition was released later.

In March 2014, a series of children's books with football themes, co-authored by Crawford and Adrian Beck, were released. The books revolve around the character "Nick", who is the captain of the Cobar Creek Crocs football team. The four books, released in paperback and eBook formats, are Crawf's Kick it to Nick: The Cursed Cup, Crawf's Kick it to Nick: Outbreak on the Oval, Crawf's Kick it to Nick: Bugs from Beyond, and Crawf's Kick it to Nick: Forward Line Freak.

== Breast cancer fundraising ==
On 16 September 2010, Crawford completed a 780 km run named "That's What I'm Walking About" from Rundle Mall in Adelaide to the Channel 9 studio in Melbourne to raise awareness for breast cancer. He took a total of 11 days to complete the run and, as a welcome into Melbourne, ran the final leg into the Channel 9 Footy Show's studio, where the panel and crowd awaited his arrival. Hundreds of "pink ladies" who were affected in some way by breast cancer showed their appreciation and support by making way for Crawford as he ran into the studio. Crawford appeared humbled and initially struggled to come to terms with what he had achieved and the stories that he had heard along the journey from breast cancer sufferers and family/friends of those with breast cancer. His efforts raised $500,000 for the cause.

In June and July 2013, Crawford cycled 3,600 km from Melbourne to Perth in a fundraising event named "Tour de Crawf" that took place over 22 days. He averaged nearly 170 km per day, and in total he raised $1,328,249 for the Breast Cancer Network Australia.

== Honours ==
In October 2000, Crawford was awarded the Australian Sports Medal for services to Australian football.

== Personal life ==
Crawford and his longtime partner Olivia Anderson have four sons: Charlie (born 2006), Benjamin (born 2008), and twins Jack and Harry (born 2011). He has two brothers, Andrew and Justin.

Crawford's interests outside football are diverse, including his passion for horse racing. In 2011, he launched his children's wear range, Kiniki, onto the market.

== Statistics ==
Legend
G	Goals	K	Kicks	D	Disposals	T	Tackles
B	Behinds	H	Handballs	M	Marks
#	Played in that season's premiership team	±	Won that season's Brownlow Medal

Season	Team	No.	Games	Totals							Averages (per game)							Votes
Season	Team	No.	Games	G	B	K	H	D	M	T	G	B	K	H	D	M	T	Votes
1992	Hawthorn	9	0	—	—	—	—	—	—	—	—	—	—	—	—	—	—	0
1993	Hawthorn	9	20	16	13	181	122	303	57	47	0.8	0.7	9.1	6.1	15.2	2.9	2.4	7
1994	Hawthorn	9	22	19	10	270	195	465	96	45	0.9	0.5	12.3	8.9	21.1	4.4	2.0	7
1995	Hawthorn	9	16	18	9	188	145	333	76	38	1.1	0.6	11.8	9.1	20.8	4.8	2.4	10
1996	Hawthorn	9	22	16	10	343	194	537	108	55	0.7	0.5	15.6	8.8	24.4	4.9	2.5	11
1997	Hawthorn	9	13	5	4	136	99	235	50	26	0.4	0.3	10.5	7.6	18.1	3.8	2.0	3
1998	Hawthorn	9	21	13	9	350	156	506	81	52	0.6	0.4	16.7	7.4	24.1	3.9	2.5	16
1999	Hawthorn	9	22	14	9	388	252	640	102	35	0.6	0.4	17.6	11.5	29.1	4.6	1.6	28^{±}
2000	Hawthorn	9	21	24	8	237	190	427	78	59	1.1	0.4	11.3	9.0	20.3	3.7	2.8	5
2001	Hawthorn	9	21	20	8	247	195	442	89	67	1.0	0.4	11.8	9.3	21.0	4.2	3.2	14
2002	Hawthorn	9	22	19	16	307	226	533	89	87	0.9	0.7	14.0	10.3	24.2	4.0	4.0	17
2003	Hawthorn	9	22	13	9	279	237	516	65	81	0.6	0.4	12.7	10.8	23.5	3.0	3.7	21
2004	Hawthorn	9	10	6	3	118	63	181	41	38	0.6	0.3	11.8	6.3	18.1	4.1	3.8	2
2005	Hawthorn	9	21	11	5	295	207	502	133	83	0.5	0.2	14.0	9.9	23.9	6.9	4.0	7
2006	Hawthorn	9	15	15	7	196	163	359	104	24	1.0	0.5	13.1	10.9	23.9	6.9	1.6	5
2007	Hawthorn	9	23	10	9	278	261	539	122	76	0.4	0.4	12.1	11.3	23.4	5.3	3.3	6
2008^{#}	Hawthorn	9	14	5	3	132	178	310	68	47	0.4	0.2	9.4	12.7	22.1	4.9	3.4	0
Career:			305	224	132	3945	2883	6828	1359	860	0.7	0.4	12.9	9.5	22.4	4.5	2.8	159

== Honours and achievements ==
Team

- AFL premiership player (Hawthorn): 2008
- Pre-season premiership player (Hawthorn): 1999

Individual

- Brownlow Medal: 1999
- AFLPA MVP: 1999
- 4× All-Australian team: 1996, 1998, 1999, 2002
- Hawthorn Captain: 1999–2004
- 4× Peter Crimmins Memorial Trophy: 1998, 1999, 2002, 2003
- Alex Jesaulenko Medal: 1998
- Herald Sun Player of the Year: 1999
- Media Association Player of the Year: 1999
- AFL Rising Star nominee: 1993
- 4× Australia international rules football team: 1998, 1999, 2002, 2003
- Australia international rules football team captain: 2002
- Australian Football Hall of Fame
- Hawthorn Hall of Fame
- Hawthorn life member
