= Bad Timing (Farscape) =

- Farscape episode
- John and Aeryn watch as an enemy craft approaches
- Episode no.: Season 4 Episode 22
- Directed by: Andrew Prowse
- Written by: David Kemper
- Original air date: March 21, 2003

Guest appearances
- Raelee Hill as Sikozu; Melissa Jaffer as Noranti; Paul Goddard as Stark; David Franklin as Captain Braca; Francesca Buller as War Minister Ahkna; John Adam as Pennoch; Kent McCord as Jack Crichton

Episode chronology
← Previous "We're So Screwed Part III: La Bomba"	Next → "The Peacekeeper Wars Part 1"

"Bad Timing" is the series finale of the Australian-American television series Farscape, written by David Kemper and directed by Andrew Prowse.

== Plot ==
The Moya crew sends Scorpius to the Peacekeeper Command Carrier that is now led by Braca, as Grayza has been confined to quarters. They strap a nuclear bomb to his chest, threatening that it will explode if the Command Carrier tries to follow Moya. Sikozu elects to go with Scorpius.

The Moya crew discover that the Scarrans have sent an attack vessel, commanded by Akhna's lover, to take over Earth in order to gain access to the bird-of-paradise flowers that they need, because John destroyed their mother plant on Katratzi in "We're So Screwed Part III: La Bomba" after inadvertently revealing earlier that the flowers also grow there. The Peacekeepers offer to hold off the Scarrans, if John—and by extension, Earth—will form an alliance with the Peacekeepers. Unwilling to drag the human race in a perpetual war between the two inter-galactic superpowers as well as enabling the Peacekeepers to dictate the human race, John says no, and speeds to the wormhole to intercept the Scarrans and figure out a way to stop them.

Harvey then argues with John in John's mind, with both of them wearing fluffy pink and white rabbit suits. Harvey convinces John there's no way he can save Earth without the help of the Peacekeepers, and he's about to concede and talk to them, when Chiana talks him out of it. He begins thinking, and each of the crew suggests to him a way to unblock his mind so he can come up with a plan. Ultimately, John formulates a way to collapse a wormhole, the downside of which is that he will have lost his route to Earth. And if he fails, he will be trapped on that side of the wormhole, on an Earth controlled by Scarrans. He decides to try, and Aeryn insists upon going with him—if he is trapped, she will be with him. He, Aeryn, and a temporarily disconnected Pilot take a shuttle to Earth's moon, where John makes an emotional farewell phone call to his father and leaves behind a capsule containing necessary technology for humanity to reach the stars in the future. Then, they successfully collapse the wormhole, and kill the Scarrans. While Moya waits on the other side, she is attacked by the Scarrans, and is damaged. When John, Aeryn, and Pilot rejoin them, they travel to an unknown water world where Moya can rest and repair.

John and Aeryn row out a short distance from Moya in a small boat, and each tells the other they have something to say. Aeryn goes first, telling John the embryo has been released from stasis and that the baby is indeed his. An ecstatic John then asks her to marry him, slips his mother's wedding ring on her finger, and she says yes. As they kiss passionately, a flying vessel suddenly appears, targets them and hits them with a ray that shatters them apart. They collapse into a shower of thousands of tiny crystalline pieces that fall down into a heap at the bottom of the boat and overboard into the ocean.

== Production ==
David Kemper has stated that "Bad Timing" was meant to follow up on John Crichton's realization in "Dog with Two Bones" that he must choose between staying with Aeryn and returning to Earth by forcing him to make a definitive choice. John's scene with Noranti in his quarters and his scene with Aeryn in the docking bay were also meant to recall "Dog with Two Bones". The scene with John speaking into the tape recorder was a reference to "Family Ties".

The episode was originally to be titled "No Turning Back" but it was changed to "Bad Timing" after the series was canceled. Ben Browder stated that they realised the "Bad Timing" theme fit the episode well during filming and that it also referred to the untimely cancellation of Farscape as the fifth season was being set up.

The "Previously on Farscape" opening to the episode features four frames (1/2 second) from every previous episode of Farscape, in the viewing order preferred by the producers.

Ben Browder has stated that the cold open from "Bad Timing" is his favorite opening scene from Farscape. David Kemper said that when he originally conceived Farscape with Rockne S. O'Bannon, they wanted it to be Star Trek but with a focus on the mind and emotions. Kemper wanted to leave time travel to his former colleagues Michael Piller and Brannon Braga. But director Andrew Prowse, influenced by Memento, challenged Kemper to utilize nonlinear storytelling, leading him to write the cold open used in "Bad Timing".

Kent McCord filmed his lines as Jack Crichton during the telephone conversation at the same time that "Kansas" and "Terra Firma" were being filmed, three months before Ben Browder's half of the conversation was filmed.

David Kemper stated that the crystal shattering sequence was originally going to serve as the finale to season three.

The final scenes in the boat were shot on location on the water near the studio.

Wayne Pygram and Raelee Hill improvised the sex scene between Scorpius and Sikozu, including the use of S&M elements.

== Reception ==
"Bad Timing" received acclaim from fans, many of whom regard it as the best episode of the series. Critics, too, widely praised the episode.

IGN bestowed an Editor's Choice Award on the episode and gave it a rating of 9 out of 10, offering particular praise for the ending. IGN's review noted, "Fans will feel like they have been kicked in the chest when the credits roll...The final shot in this episode shows why Farscape fans have stuck around for so long – the unexpected is commonplace and the results worth waiting for."

A BBC reviewer called it "a worthy end to a wonderful series" but also noted that while most loose ends are tied up, "a few stray threads left an irritating sense of incompleteness" and that the ending prevented a happy sense of closure that the rest of the episode could have achieved. Nevertheless, the BBC reviewer praised the decision: "No compromise right to the end - how could we not have loved this programme?" and concluded, "Tense, emotional, and conclusive, Bad Timing had everything a finale needs, including a sense of finality."

The cliffhanger that ends the episode, as well as most remaining plot threads, would be resolved 18 months later when the two-part miniseries Farscape: The Peacekeeper Wars aired on Sci-Fi.

== Guest stars ==
- Raelee Hill as Sikozu
- Melissa Jaffer as Noranti
- Paul Goddard as Stark
- David Franklin as Captain Braca
- Francesca Buller as War Minister Ahkna
- John Adam as Pennoch
- Kent McCord as Jack Crichton
