= Farscape: The Game =

2002 video game

- Developer(s): Red Lemon Studios; Jim Henson Interactive
- Publisher(s): Simon & Schuster
- Platform(s): Windows
- Release: August 8, 2002
- Genre(s): Science fiction, Action-Adventure
- Mode(s): Single Player

Farscape: The Game is an action-adventure video game, released in 2002, based on the first season of the science-fiction television show Farscape. It was developed by Red Lemon Studios.

== Premise ==
The game starts with the crew on board Moya when they get attacked by a Peacekeeper command carrier. Crichton and Chiana are forced to abandon ship on Aeryn's Prowler, which they crash land on the planet that is below them.

Whilst this is happening, Aeryn, Rygel, Zhaan and D'Argo get locked on board in the cells aboard Moya. The main purpose of the game is for Crichton and Chiana to get reunited with the rest of Moya's Crew and escape the attacking command carrier.

== Plot ==
Whilst orbiting an unnamed planet, Moya is attacked by several Peacekeeper Marauders from the nearby Command Carrier. Whilst Aeryn and D'Argo fight the boarding Commandos and are captured, Rygel escapes into the ventilation shafts and Crichton and Chiana try to escape on Aeryn's Prowler. The Prowler is shot down by the Peacekeepers, though the duo survives and make their way to a nearby town where they meet Tarn, a mechanic who offers to fix the Prowler and a Nebari healer who reveals herself to be free of her species' misconceptions and thus harmless. They take Tarn to the Prowler (and fight their way through Raiders trying to scavenge it) and he begins repairs. Meanwhile, a woman named Danera offers to take them in whilst they remain in the settlement. In exchange, she asks them to clean the Culture Houses that she owns of animals who have taken residence there which they do.

== Characters ==
- John Crichton - Ben Browder
- Chiana - Gigi Edgley
- Pa'u Zotoh Zhaan - Virginia Hey
- Aeryn Sun - Claudia Black
- Pilot - Lani Tupu
- Ka D'Argo - Anthony Simcoe
- Bialar Crais - Lani Tupu
- Rygel - Jonathan Hardy
