= Crais =

Crais may refer to:

- Bialar Crais, a fictional character from the Farscape universe
- Robert Crais, an American author of detective fiction
