= Bad Timing (disambiguation) =

Bad Timing is a 1980 film directed by Nicolas Roeg. It may also refer to:

== Music ==
- Bad Timing (album), by Jim O'Rourke, and the title song
- Bad Timing and Other Stories, an EP by The Triffids, including the song "Bad Timing"
- "Bad Timing", a song by Blue Rodeo from their album Five Days in July
- "Bad Timing", a song by dEUS from their album Pocket Revolution
- "Bad Timing", a song by Oh Land from her EP Xtra

== Other uses ==
- "Bad Timing" (Farscape), the final episode of the Australian science fiction television series, Farscape
- A novel in the Strontium Dog series by Rebecca Levene
- "Bad Timing" (Adventure Time), an episode of the American animated television series, Adventure Time
