= Farscape: The Peacekeeper Wars =

2004 film

- Genre: Science fiction
- Created by: Rockne S. O'Bannon
- Written by: Rockne S. O'Bannon; David Kemper
- Directed by: Brian Henson
- Theme music composer: Guy Gross
- Countries of origin: United States; Australia
- Original language: English
- No. of episodes: 2 (list of episodes)

Production
- Executive producer: David Kemper
- Running time: 182 minutes
- Production companies: Hallmark Entertainment; The Jim Henson Company

Original release
- Network: Sci-Fi Channel
- Release: 17 October – 18 October 2004

Related
- Bad Timing; The Beginning of the End of the Beginning

Farscape: The Peacekeeper Wars is a military science fiction television miniseries written by Rockne S. O'Bannon and David Kemper and directed by Brian Henson. Following the original series' cancellation in September 2002, it aimed to wrap up the cliffhanger and tie up some elements of the series in general. It was broadcast on 17 and 18 October 2004. Henson and others have attributed the return of Farscape to the ongoing campaign of fans. Production began in December 2003. In May 2004 the Sci-Fi Channel, now owned by NBC Universal, announced that it would run a two-episode conclusion titled Farscape: The Peacekeeper Wars.

Henson refers to the three hours as episodes 4.23–4.26, though the New South Wales Film Office refers to the production as a "2 × 2 hour telemovie" (including commercials). Production of the miniseries ended in March 2004 and, in addition to the announced airing on the Sci-Fi Channel in the US, was also scheduled to be broadcast in the UK on Sky1 on 16 and 23 January 2005, and by Five on 8 March. The Peacekeeper Wars earned a 1.7 household Nielsen rating, drawing 1.96 million viewers and making the Sci-Fi channel the #1 non-sports cable network for people aged 25–54 and 18–49 for the time period over the two nights. However, the ratings were lower than those of most other Sci-Fi Channel miniseries, and not a significant improvement.

Early fan speculation hoped that high Nielsen ratings would prove the viability of renewing the series, but since the ratings were unexceptional, continuation was ruled out. Brian Henson has stated on many occasions that he would like to bring the Farscape saga to the big screen, but there has been no development on that front for years. In October 2005, Farscape entered syndication in the US, airing on Superstation WGN and on a variety of local, cable, satellite and broadcast affiliates including Ion Television, but vanished from syndication after about two years. In 2013, the channel Pivot started airing the entire series in syndication. All four years' episodes were also available to Canadians and Americans on Netflix until November 2016.

On the date of the show's twentieth anniversary – March 19, 2019 – all four seasons of Farscape as well as Farscape: The Peacekeeper Wars were made available on Amazon Prime Video in the U.S., United Kingdom, Canada, Australia, New Zealand, Scandinavian countries, and several other countries around the world.

== Plot ==
The Scarran and Peacekeeper fleets engage one another

Far from the water world where John Crichton and Aeryn Sun have been crystallized in the series-ending cliffhanger, a Peacekeeper fleet under the command of Scorpius and a Scarran fleet under Emperor Staleek engage in battle. The war that has now begun between the Peacekeepers and Scarrans as a result of Scorpius's unauthorized actions will be intensified over the prize to be won: John Crichton, whose mind contains the knowledge to make wormholes into weapons of mass destruction. In the meantime, Crichton and Aeryn are reformed by the race that had "crystallized" them previously, thanks to Rygel's careful retrieval of their crystallized components from the ocean floor two months after the events of "Bad Timing". Scorpius senses Crichton's revival, and with Sikozu journeys to the water planet with his command carrier, withdrawing from the battle.

The water world itself turns out to be the last outpost of the Eidelons, a race who once used their empathic abilities to encourage peace. Since their homeworld of Arnessk was made uninhabitable 12,000 years (or "cycles") before, the surviving Eidelon have forgotten how to use their abilities. Ka D'Argo reveals that the crew of Moya, their living Leviathan spaceship, discovered and revived the Eidelon on Arnessk. Two Eidelons, one a soldier, are selected to contact the revived Eidelon, and they board Moya as Scorpius arrives in orbit. Noranti remains on the water world to educate the Eidelon descendants on their lost culture. Due to the ongoing war between the Peacekeepers and the Scarrans, Scorpius and Sikozu accompany the crew with the passcodes they will need to get out of Peacekeeper territory.

Aeryn was pregnant with Crichton's child, but when she was reconstituted there was no sign of the baby. It is soon very apparent that when Rygel ingested their crystallized particles, the particles comprising the unborn child remained inside him, and the fetus is now growing inside him. At the edge of Peacekeeper space, Moya is harpooned and boarded by Tragan bounty hunters hired by the Peacekeepers to search ships leaving their territory. After a firefight, the Tragans are repelled just before Moya starbursts to Arnessk.

On the planet, they enter the Eidelon temple in the company of their former crewmate Jool; however, the Hierarch is not encouraged to help their efforts until he meets his descendant first hand. The Hierarch reveals that Aeryn's race, the Sebaceans, were early humans taken from Earth and genetically engineered 27,000 cycles before to act as Peacekeepers after the Eidelons had departed from an area. When the Eidelons entered suspended animation, without their moderating influence, the Peacekeepers became a militaristic expansionist empire.

After the Hierarch has boarded the ship and met his descendants in the company of the former Banik slave Stark, Staleek's Scarran Decimator arrives and destroys the temple and all in it, including Jool. Moya is threatened with destruction unless everyone except Pilot leaves her. D'Argo and Chiana take his ship, Lo'La (which has a cloaking device) to seek help while the others divert the Scarrans' attention by going over to their ship. On board Lo'La, Chiana and D'Argo examine the Decimator and discover points of weakness in the structure. However, before they can take advantage of this knowledge, the Scarrans detect Chiana and D'Argo and Lo'La is destroyed while the others are taken prisoner by the Scarrans. Floating in space, Chiana and D'Argo are rescued by his estranged son Jothee, who has arrived with a ship of Luxan warriors. D'Argo shares what he has discovered about the Decimator with his son.

Under a Scarran heat probe, Crichton protests that he is unable to give Staleek the wormhole weapon knowledge he seeks. To prove it, he takes Staleek on board Farscape One through a wormhole to meet the alien known as Einstein, a member of the Ancients, the race that implanted the knowledge in Crichton's mind. There, Staleek is convinced that Crichton's knowledge does not extend to the creation of weapons, and Crichton warns him that such use of this knowledge would have disastrous consequences for the universe.

By the time Staleek and Crichton return to the Scarran Decimator, he appears convinced and even receptive, under the subtle influence of the Eidelon Hierarch, to seeking an end to war with the Peacekeepers. However, War Minister Akhna shoots the Hierarch and clears Staleek's mind. He leaves in fury and has a preservative gas released into the chamber just after Stark uses his essence-absorbing ability to store the Hierarch's power in himself and Rygel suffers a seizure, forcing Crichton to transfer the fetus back to Aeryn.

Crichton helps Sikozu adhere to the ceiling above the gas so she can pyrokinetically release a burst of flame that ignites it, blasting their prison open while the Luxans attack at the same time. They escape from the Scarrans, re-board Moya, and starburst away. On board Moya, Scorpius tries to persuade Crichton to yield the wormhole knowledge to the Peacekeepers. Crichton rages that he does not want to give the knowledge to the Peacekeepers, the Scarrans, or anyone. His only concern is for Aeryn and their soon-to-be-born child, but in order to live in a safe galaxy, he may have to take desperate measures. He flies Farscape One back to see Einstein, who unlocks the knowledge Crichton needs. Moya returns to the water world so that Stark can transfer the Hierarch's knowledge to the Eidelons there.

The water world becomes a battleground between the Peacekeepers and the Scarrans, and Moya is caught in the crossfire. Moya seeks the most immediate refuge within range — the bottom of the sea. Moya's internal sensors are damaged and she begins to take on water as a search is undertaken for Stark and the knowledge he has. After they find him terrified and awed by the personality he has assimilated on the Scarran ship, the crew of Moya takes a transport pod to the surface.

The siege

They find the Eidelon city under siege, and only a handful of survivors. During the siege, Scorpius discovers Sikozu has been relaying their position to the Scarrans in exchange for a promise for them to free her people from servitude. Scorpius leaves her behind while Moya's crew, together with what remains of Scorpius's Peacekeeper forces, fight their way out through the Scarrans.

In the middle of battle, Aeryn goes into labour and gives birth to a baby boy. Meanwhile, Jothee and Noranti have been rescuing Eidelon survivors from the burnt-out city. Stark manages to transfer the Hierarch's knowledge to the Eidelon high priestess, Muoma. It is hoped that with that knowledge, the surviving Eidelons can bring peace, but as they make their way back to Moya, they are ambushed by Ahkna's forces. Aeryn manages to shoot Ahkna before she can kill Crichton, but D'Argo is mortally wounded by a Scarran spear. He stays behind to cover their retreat as the living ship retrieves the others in her docking web.

Commandant Mele-On Grayza, now in charge of the Peacekeeper fleet since she poisoned her lover Maryk, the Grand Chancellor, squares off against the Scarran fleet above the water planet. With Rygel's and Scorpius's admonitions ringing in his ears, Crichton seats himself in a mental projection chair and uses his unlocked wormhole knowledge to show the opposing forces what they have been demanding: the wormhole weapon.

High above the water planet, a small wormhole appears. Everyone is initially unimpressed, but the wormhole begins to expand exponentially, dragging in and destroying several Scarran and Peacekeeper ships, then the nearby planet.

Caught in the gravitational pull of the wormhole, Crichton broadcasts to all sides that this is what wormhole weapons represent — not peace, not even war, but utter destruction. He informs the increasingly stunned and horrified onlookers that this single wormhole weapon will continue doubling in size until it destroys not only the Solar System and then the entire rest of the galaxy, but the entire universe. As Moya's crew objects, he sardonically reminds them that even they have continuously asked for this. Weapons don't make peace, he reminds them, people make peace. He offers the two enemy fleets a choice: come to terms, or he will allow the wormhole to run its course and consume everything in existence. Commandant Grayza and a much reluctant Emperor Staleek finally agree to stand down and accept Eidelon mediation. Crichton shuts down the wormhole just as Einstein removes all the wormhole weapon's knowledge (Harvey states this from his death bed) from his mind, but then falls into a catatonic stupor.

While the peace treaty is signed, Aeryn keeps vigil over Crichton's body. Chiana decides to go with Rygel to Hyneria, where Rygel will retake his throne, to overcome her grief at D'Argo's death. Stark kneels at Crichton's bedside in thanks, removes his half-face mask for the last time as he has finally achieved peace within himself – (that side of his face now healed to merely scar-tissue). Harvey the neural clone "dies" finally; because Einstein removed all of the wormhole weapon's knowledge from Crichton's brain, he has no more reason to exist. With the wormhole knowledge out of Crichton's brain, Scorpius no longer has any need to keep chasing him, so says his goodbyes then lets himself go. Aeryn, unwilling to accept her son if it means losing Crichton, places their infant son beside Crichton (in the hopes that might revive him), and he soon "awakens" and moves to proudly hug his son, as Aeryn is moved to tears at the sight. With a vast starscape in front of them on Moya, Crichton and Aeryn announce that they have chosen for their son a name that represents strength and courage: D'Argo Sun-Crichton. They show their son the vast starfield, hopeful that their son will never have to experience war, as Crichton proclaims that "This is your playground".

== Cast ==
- Ben Browder as John Crichton
- Claudia Black as Aeryn Sun
- Anthony Simcoe as Ka D'Argo
- Gigi Edgley as Chiana
- Wayne Pygram as Scorpius and Harvey
- Jonathan Hardy as Rygel
- Lani Tupu as Pilot
- Raelee Hill as Sikozu
- Paul Goddard as Stark
- Melissa Jaffer and Amanda Wenban as Noranti
- David Franklin as Braca
- Rebecca Riggs as Commandant Grayza
- Francesca Buller as War Minister Ahkna
- Nathaniel Dean as Jothee
- Tammy MacIntosh as Jool
- John Bach as Einstein
- Hugh Keays-Byrne as Grunchlk
- Sandy Gore as Muoma
- Ron Haddrick as Yondalao
- Linal Haft as Maryk
- Stephen James King as Pikal
- Tim McCunn as Caa'ta
- John Adam as Sgt. Learko/Lt. Jatog
- Kim De Lury as Peacekeeper Captain
- Judi Farr as Scarran doctor

== Home video release ==
The miniseries has been released on DVD in the US and UK by Lionsgate Entertainment and The Contender Entertainment Group respectively, as well as in Australia. The US version features both segments edited into a three-hour movie, while the UK version is a two-disc set with one segment per disc. Both versions contain a making-of documentary, with a selection of deleted scenes being exclusive to the UK disc. The Australian version has one disc with no extras. In 2014 the distributor Alive released a German region free Blu-ray of the miniseries marketed as "Farscape: Season Five- The Peacekeeper Wars", the following year other Blu-ray editions were released in the UK and Australia. As of 2015 there has been no mention of a Blu-ray release of the miniseries in North America.
