= Francesca Buller =

British actress

- Born: 20 January 1964 (age 62); United Kingdom
- Education: Royal Central School of Speech and Drama
- Occupation: Actress
- Spouse: Ben Browder (m. 1989)

Francesca Buller (born 20 January 1964) is an English actress best known for her portrayal of various characters in the TV series Farscape, most notably that of War Minister Ahkna. She also has performed in theatre roles, including in Hamlet and Merchant of Venice.

Buller is married to fellow actor Ben Browder, who played John Crichton in Farscape and Cameron Mitchell in Stargate SG-1. They met while they were studying at the Central School of Speech and Drama in London.

Buller was nominated for Best Special Guest Television in "Bad Timing" for the SyFy Genre Awards.

== Filmography ==
- Heatstroke (2008) ... Dr. Taggert
- Farscape: The Peacekeeper Wars (2004) (TV film) .... War Minister Ahkna
- Kiss of a Killer (1993) (TV)
- Chaplin (1992) .... Minnie Chaplin
- Those Secrets (1992) (TV)
- Deceived (1991) .... Lillian
- Fever (1991/I) (TV) .... Denise
- She's Been Away (1989) (TV) .... Hospital Nurse

=== Notable TV guest appearances ===
- Farscape playing "Minister Ahkna" in "Bad Timing" (episode No. 4.22) 21 March 2003
- Farscape playing "Minister Ahkna" "We're So Screwed Part III: La Bomba" (episode No. 4.21) 14 March 2003
- Farscape playing "Minister Ahkna" "We're So Screwed Part II: Hot to Katratzi" (episode No. 4.20) 7 March 2003
- Farscape playing "Minister Ahkna" "Bringing Home the Beacon" (episode No. 4.16) 7 February 2003
- Farscape playing "Raxil" "Scratch 'n Sniff" (episode No. 3.13) 20 July 2001
- Farscape playing "ro-NA" "Look at the Princess Part II: I Do, I Think" (episode No. 2.12) 28 July 2000
- Farscape playing "ro-NA" "Look at the Princess Part I: A Kiss is But a Kiss" (episode No. 2.11) 21 July 2000
- Farscape playing "M'Lee" "Bone to Be Wild" (episode No. 1.21) 21 January 2000
- Father Dowling Mysteries playing "Gloria" "The Royal Mystery" (episode No. 3.1) 20 September 1990
