= Ben Browder =

American actor, writer and film director

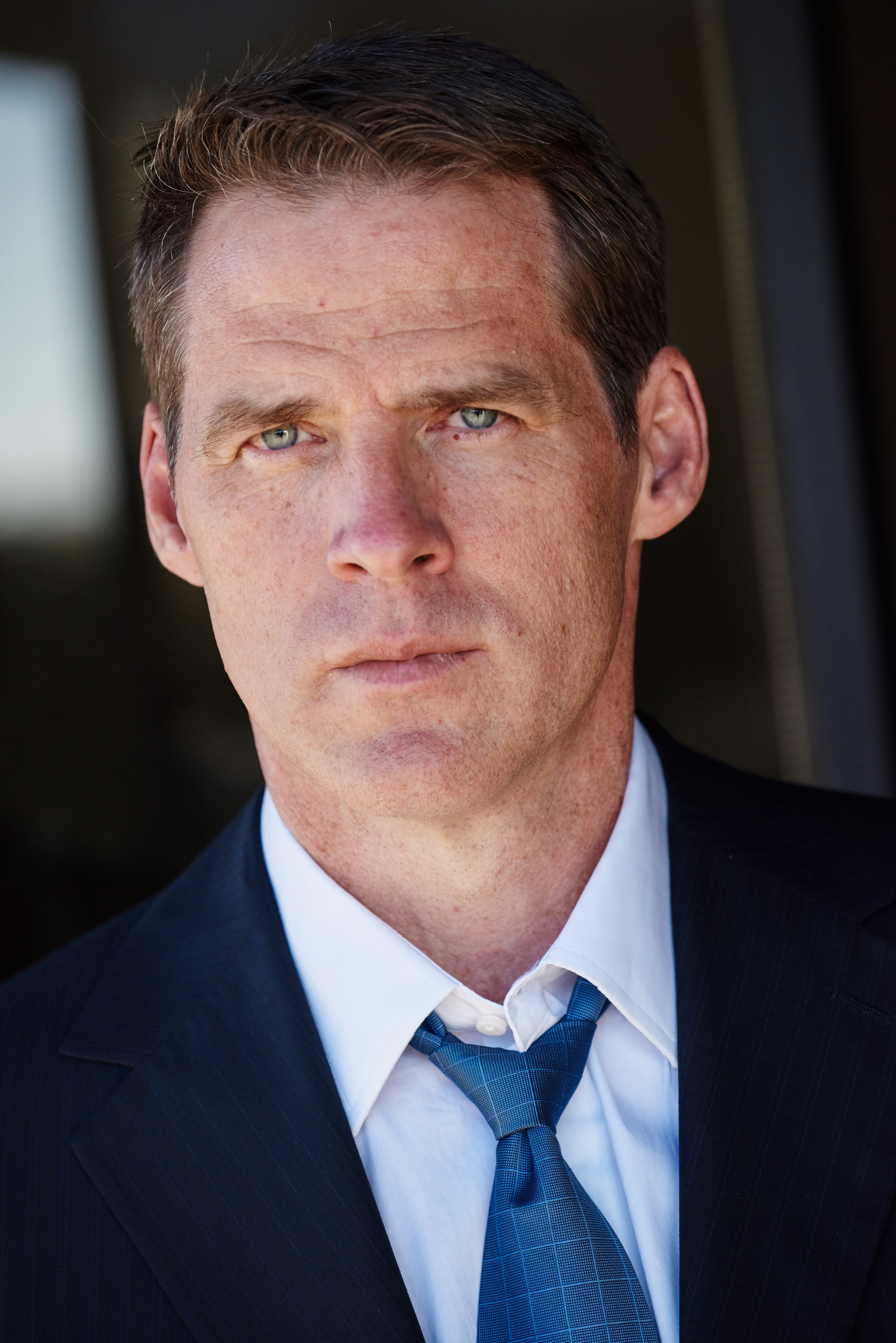
- Browder in 2018
- Born: Robert Benedict Browder; December 11, 1962 (age 63); Memphis, Tennessee, U.S.
- Education: Furman University; Royal Central School of Speech and Drama
- Occupations: Actor; writer; film director
- Years active: 1978–present
- Spouse: Francesca Buller (m. 1989)

Robert Benedict Browder (born December 11, 1962) is an American actor, writer and film director. He is best known for his roles as John Crichton in Farscape and Cameron Mitchell in Stargate SG-1.

== Early life ==
Browder was born in Memphis, Tennessee and grew up in Charlotte, North Carolina. His parents were race car owners and operators. He attended Furman University in Greenville, South Carolina, and graduated with a degree in psychology. He was a star player on the Furman football team. Browder met his wife, actress Francesca Buller, while studying at the Central School of Speech and Drama in London.

== Career ==
Browder appeared as a recurring guest on the U.S. television show Party of Five as Sam Brody in its third season in 1997. Browder and Buller moved with their two children to Australia during the production of Farscape (1999–2003), on which Browder starred as American astronaut John Crichton. Buller played several guest roles on the show. The two returned to the United States in 2003 following the cancellation of Farscape. He has received two Saturn Awards for Best Actor in a Television Role for his acting in Farscape. He appeared in the 2004 film A Killer Within, co-starring C. Thomas Howell and Sean Young. Also in 2004, he portrayed fellow actor Lee Majors in the television film Behind the Camera: The Unauthorized Story of Charlie's Angels.

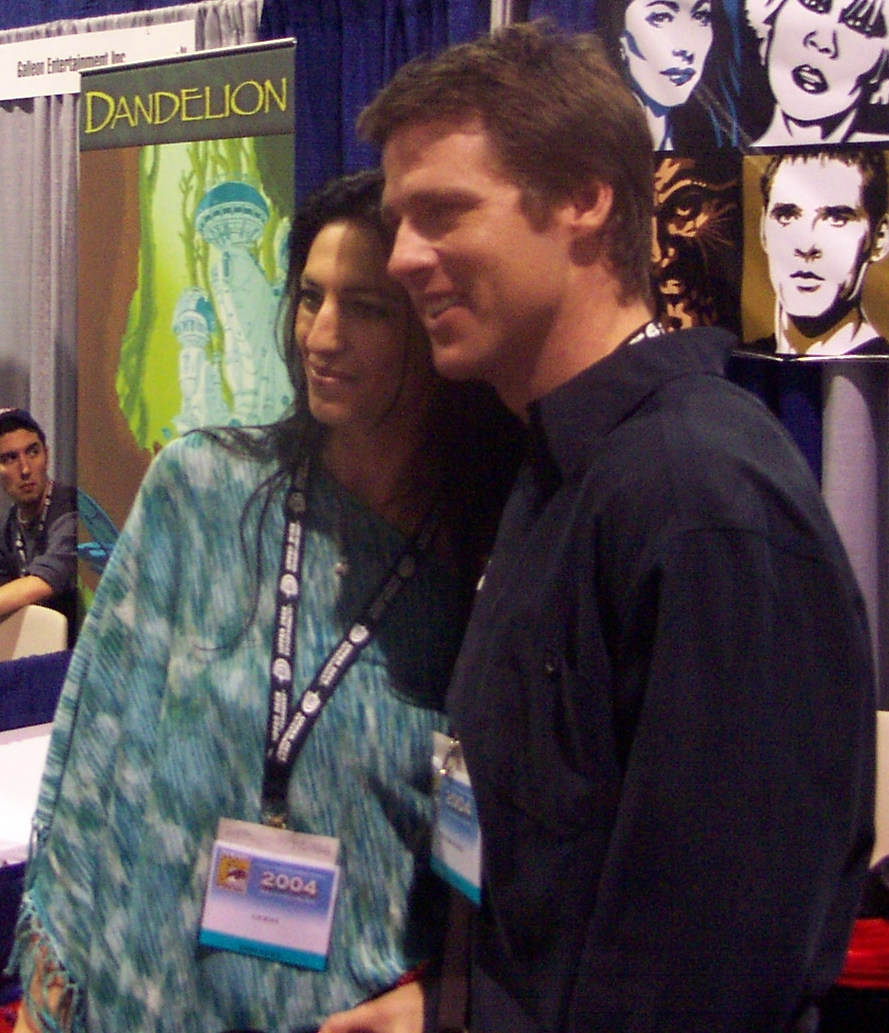
Claudia Black with Ben Browder at San Diego Comic-Con in 2004

He returned to play John Crichton in the 2004 SciFi Channel miniseries Farscape: The Peacekeeper Wars. The miniseries wrapped up the remaining plotlines of Farscape, while leaving open the possibility of future adventures.

October 2003 marked the audiobook release of Interlopers, a novel written by Alan Dean Foster and narrated by Browder.

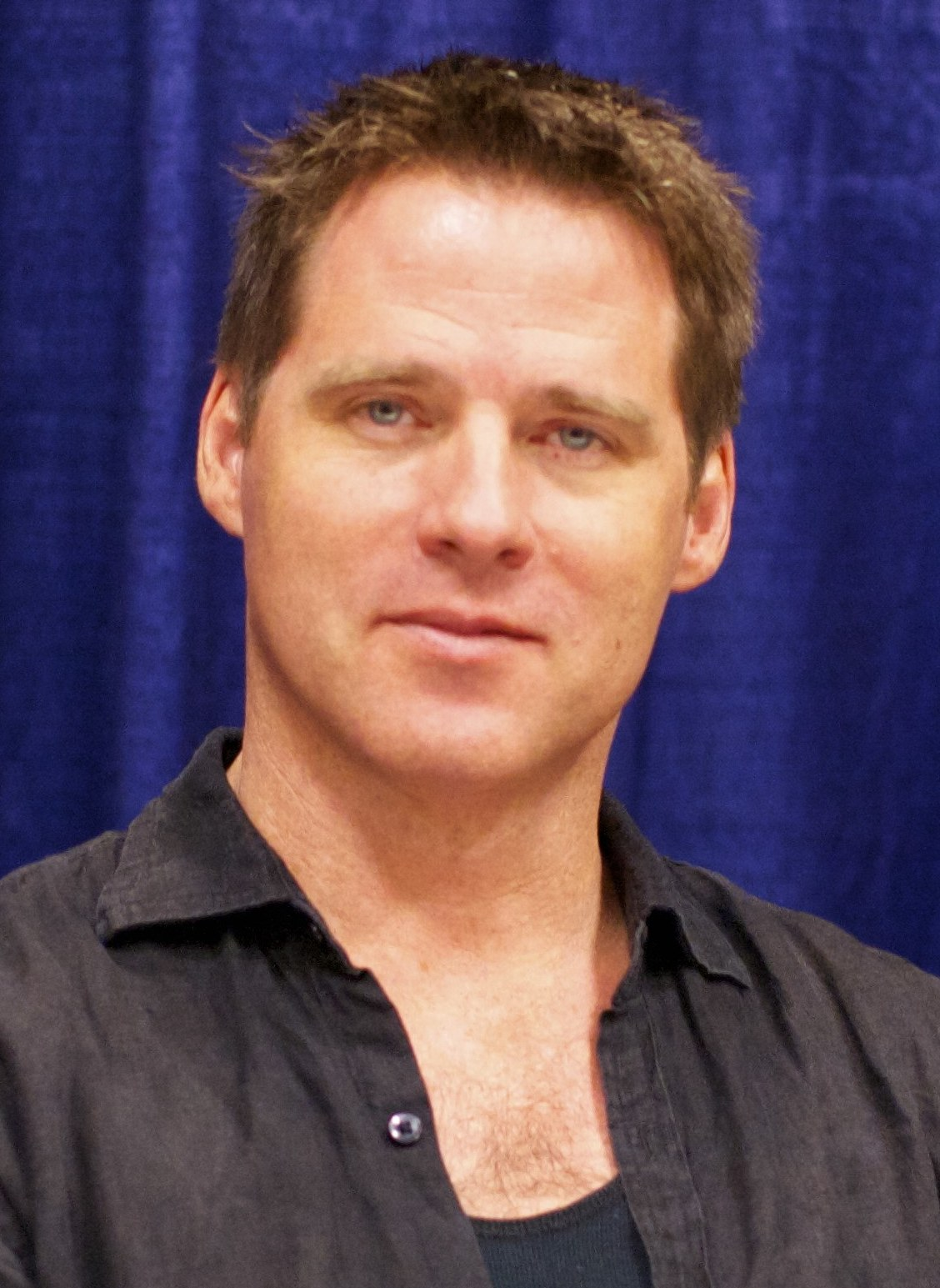
Ben Browder at Dragoncon 2010

In January 2005, Browder voiced the character Bartholomew Aloysius "Bat" Lash in an episode of the animated series Justice League Unlimited entitled "The Once and Future Thing, Part 1: Weird Western Tales".

Browder returned to the SciFi Channel as he joined the cast of Stargate SG-1 for its ninth season in 2005. He played the character of Lieutenant Colonel Cameron Mitchell, the new commanding officer of SG-1. Browder's former Farscape co-star Claudia Black appeared on SG-1 in the eighth-season episode entitled "Prometheus Unbound" and again during the first episodes of the ninth season before becoming a regular cast member on the series at the beginning of its tenth season in 2006. Several episodes of Stargate SG-1, most notably "200", comically alluded to Farscape during Browder and Black's time on the series. In addition to being a series regular on Stargate SG-1, Browder also performed many of his own stunts.

In 2012, Browder was cast in a series 7 episode of Doctor Who, "A Town Called Mercy". It was filmed in Almeria, Spain, in March 2012.

Browder played the role of Max the Janitor in the 2012 live-action feature film Bad Kids Go to Hell, based on the graphic novel of the same name. He reprised the role and made his directorial debut in the 2017 sequel Bad Kids of Crestview Academy.

== Filmography ==
=== Film ===
| Year | Title | Role | Notes |
|---|---|---|---|
| 1978 | Duncan's World | Gates | |
| 1990 | Memphis Belle | Rookie Captain | |
| 1991 | Daughters of Privilege | Randy | Television film |
| 1991 | A Kiss Before Dying | Tommy Roussell | |
| 1992 | Secrets | Bill Warwick | Television film |
| 1995 | Big Dreams and Broken Hearts: The Dottie West Story | Al Winters | Television film |
| 1996 | Innocent Victims | Gary Eatburn | Television film |
| 1997 | Nevada | Shelby | |
| 1997 | Steel Chariots | D.J. Tucker | Television film |
| 1997 | Bad to the Bone | Brent | Television film |
| 1998 | The Sky's on Fire | Racer | Television film |
| 1998 | Boogie Boy | Freddy | |
| 2004 | A Killer Within | Sam Moss | |
| 2004 | Farscape: The Peacekeeper Wars | John Crichton | Television film Saturn Award for Best Actor on Television |
| 2008 | Stargate: The Ark of Truth | Lieutenant Colonel Cameron Mitchell | |
| 2008 | Stargate: Continuum | Colonel Cameron Mitchell | |
| 2012 | Bad Kids Go to Hell | Max | |
| 2014 | The Adventures of RoboRex | Robert Miller | |
| 2014 | Dead Still | Brandon Davis | Television film |
| 2016 | Outlaws and Angels | George Tildon | |
| 2017 | Bad Kids of Crestview Academy | Max | Directorial debut |
| 2017 | Guardians of the Galaxy Vol. 2 | Sovereign Admiral | |
| 2017 | Hoax | Rick Paxton | |
| 2018 | Being | Agent Dixon | |
| 2018 | God Bless the Broken Road | Sergeant Price | |
| 2021 | Iké Boys | Wayne Gunderson | |

=== Television ===
| Year | Title | Role | Notes |
|---|---|---|---|
| 1992 | The Boys of Twilight | Tyler Clare | Unknown episodes |
| 1993 | Grace Under Fire | Eric | Episode: "Grace Undergraduate" |
| 1994 | Melrose Place | Adam | Episode: "The Two Mrs. Mancinis" |
| 1994 | Thunder Alley | Marcus | Episode: "Girls' Night Out" |
| 1994 | Murder, She Wrote | Ollie Rudman | Episode: "Murder by Twos" |
| 1996 | Strangers | Eric | Episode: "My Ward, My Keepers" |
| 1996–1997 | Party of Five | Sam Brody | 10 episodes |
| 1999–2003 | Farscape | John Crichton | 88 episodes Saturn Award for Best Actor on Television; Nominated—Saturn Award for Best Actor on Television (2000–01, 2003) |
| 2003 | CSI: Miami | Danny Maxwell | Episode: "Tinder Box" |
| 2005 | Justice League Unlimited | Bat Lash | Voice, episode: "The Once and Future Thing, Part One: Weird Western Tales" |
| 2005–2007 | Stargate SG-1 | Lieutenant Colonel Cameron Mitchell | 40 episodes Nominated—Saturn Award for Best Actor on Television |
| 2012 | Chuck | Ron | Episode: "Chuck vs. The Bullet Train" |
| 2012 | Doctor Who | Isaac | Episode: "A Town Called Mercy" |
| 2013–2014 | Arrow | Ted Gaynor | 2 episodes |
| 2014 | CSI: Crime Scene Investigation | Randy Pruitt | Episode: "Dead Woods" |
| 2018 | Criminal Minds | Police Chief Steve Gaines | Episode: "Full-Tilt Boogie" |
| 2020 | All Rise | Ephraim Bowles | Episode: "My Fair Lockdown" |
| 2020 | S.W.A.T. | Sergeant Tim Davis | Episode: "Fracture" |
| 2022 | Walker | Nate Smith | 2 episodes |
| 2023 | Station 19 | Fire Captain | 2 episodes |
| 2024 | Landman | Colonel Ivey | 3 episodes |

=== Video game ===
| Year | Title | Role | Notes |
|---|---|---|---|
| 2002 | Farscape: The Game | John Crichton | Voice |
| 2015 | Call of Duty: Black Ops III | Player (Male) | Voice and motion capture |

== Awards ==
- 2000 – Nominated for the Saturn Award for Best Genre TV Actor for Farscape
- 2001 – Nominated for the Saturn Award for Best Actor on Television for Farscape
- 2002 – Won the Saturn Award for Best Actor in a Television Series for Farscape
- 2003 – Nominated for the Saturn Award for Best Actor in a Television Series for Farscape
- 2004 – Won the Saturn Award for Best Actor on Television for Farscape: The Peacekeeper Wars
- 2005 – Nominated for the Saturn Award for Best Actor on Television for Stargate SG-1
