= Rock 'N' Roll Cowboys =

- Directed by: Rob Stewart
- Starring: Peter Phelps; David Franklin; Nikki Coghill
- Country of origin: Australia
- Original language: English

Production
- Producers: James Vernon; Jan Tyrell
- Running time: 95 mins
- Production company: Somserset Films

Original release
- Release: 30 December 1988

Rock 'N' Roll Cowboys is a 1988 Australian television film about a roadie.

== Cast ==
- Peter Phelps as Eddie
- David Franklin
- Nikki Coghill as Teena Tungsten
