= Syntax Error (film) =

- Directed by: Andrew Lancaster
- Written by: Liz Doran
- Produced by: Miranda Culle; Josie Mason
- Starring: Helmut Bakaitis; Kim Cooper; Sacha Horler; Anthony Simcoe; Josh Quong Tart; Lucy McLure
- Cinematography: Steve Macdonald
- Edited by: John Buck
- Music by: David McCormack; Anthony Partos
- Release date: 4 December 2003
- Running time: 13 minutes
- Country: Australia
- Language: English

Syntax Error is a 2003 short Australian comedy film directed by Andrew Lancaster.

== Plot ==
Lauren (Sacha Horler) doesn't want to have a baby. She just wants to change the world into something different... the computer world. But to make changes, you sometimes have to break the code in order to make a computer that everyone can use.

== Cast ==
- Sacha Horler as Lauren
- Anthony Simcoe as Steve
- Josh Quong Tart as Desmond
- Helmut Bakaitis as Doctor
- Lucy McLure as Nurse #1
- Kim Cooper as Nurse #2

== Reception ==
Syntax Error was among the Screen Music Awards 2004 nominees for "Best Music for a Short Film".
