= Raelee Hill =

Australian actress (born 1972)

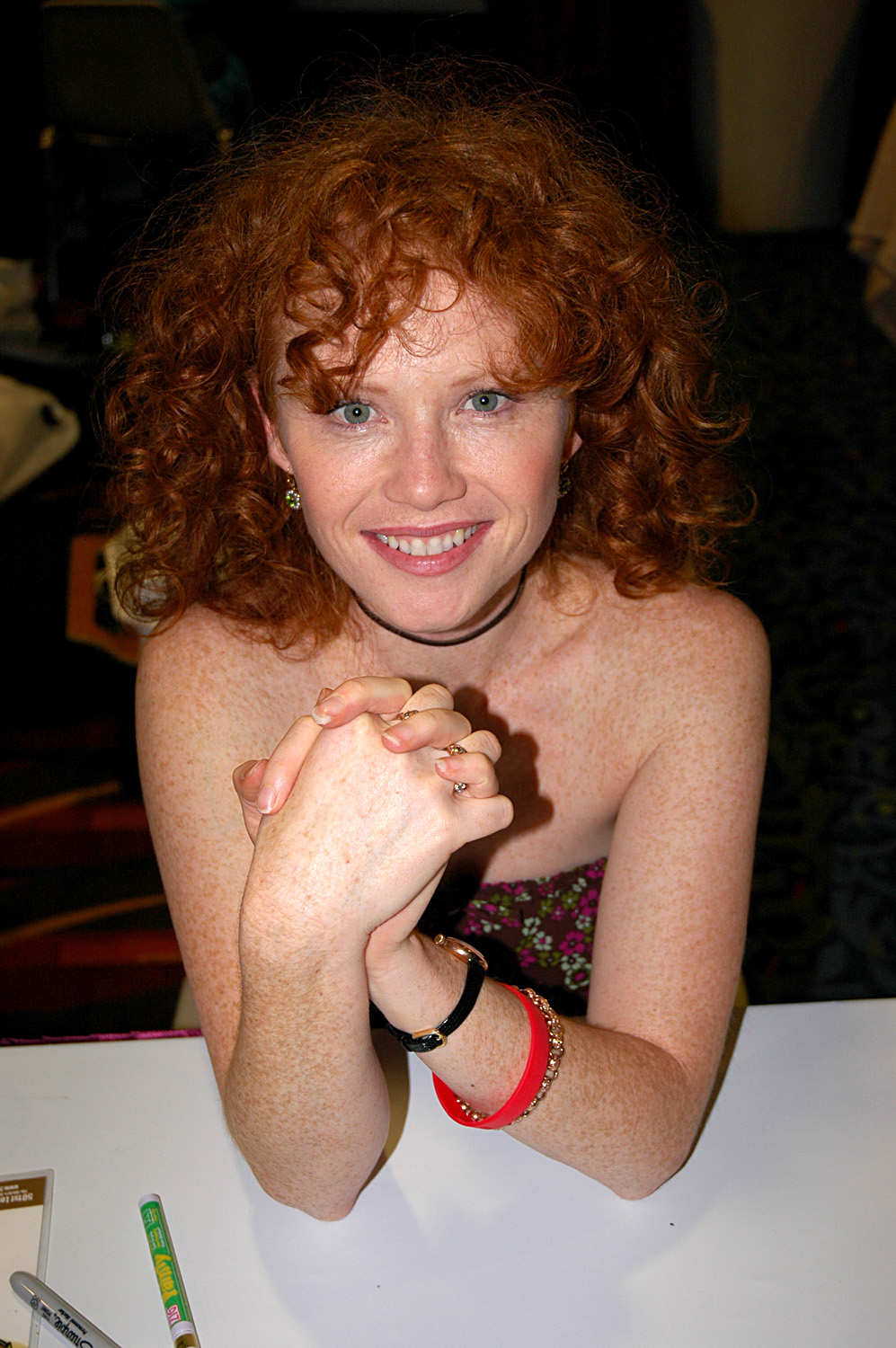
- Hill in 2005
- Born: Brisbane, Queensland, Australia
- Occupation: Actress
- Years active: 1993–present
- Children: 2

Raelee Hill is an Australian actress, known for portraying roles in some of Australia's most successful television series. Her first major role was as Loretta Taylor in Paradise Beach, which was followed shortly afterwards by roles as Serendipity Gottlieb in Neighbours and Constable Tayler Johnson in Water Rats. She had a supporting role as Sikozu in the sci-fi series Farscape and the miniseries Farscape: The Peacekeeper Wars.

== Early life ==
Hill was born in Brisbane to Stan, an oil refinery worker, and Janette, an art teacher and potter. She has an older sister. Hill is of Scottish and Irish descent. Hill attended Moreton Bay College, where she became school captain and was on debate and softball teams.

== Career ==
From 1993 until 1994, Hill starred in Paradise Beach as Loretta Taylor. Hill secured the role while she was studying an arts degree at university. She had six months to go of a three year course. Hill enjoyed playing Loretta, as she was "not a typical Aussie soap character". Loretta was known for being "quirky" and often wore eccentric outfits, which Hill said made her interesting to play. She appeared in the guest role of Jill Lambert in an episode of Blue Heelers in July 1994. She had to have her red hair sprayed black due to her close resemblance to lead actress Julie Nihill.

Two days after finishing up on Blue Heelers, Hill joined the cast of Neighbours as "free-spirited" Serendipity Gottlieb, sister of Mark Gottlieb (played by Bruce Samazan). Hill had been spotted in a café by the show's casting director Jan Russ. She made her first appearance on 25 August 1994. Hill left Neighbours in 1995, after her contract was not renewed. She appeared in the soap opera spoof Shark Bay in 1996, and made her film debut in the romantic comedy Hotel de Love. In early 1997, Hill joined the cast of police drama Water Rats as rookie officer Tayler Johnson. She relocated to Sydney from Melbourne for the role. Hill has appeared in several theatre roles, including the role of Wendy in Pan for The Jim Henson Company.

In 2001, Hill appeared in the two-part television adaption of My Brother Jack as Sheila Meredith. In 2002, she was cast in the supporting role of Sikozu in the Australian-American sci-fi television series Farscape. She originally auditioned for the part of Mele-On Grayza, but the part ultimately went to Rebecca Riggs. The role of Sikozu was created especially for her by executive producer David Kemper (writer) after impressing him during her audition. Hill also appeared as Sikozu in the 2004 miniseries Farscape: The Peacekeeper Wars.

She had a brief role in Superman Returns in 2006, followed by appearances in the 2007 Indonesian film Long Road to Heaven about the 2002 Bali bombing, and Event Zero (2017). In 2022, Hill appeared in the comedy drama series After the Verdict as Belinda.

== Filmography ==
=== Film ===
Raelee Hill film credits
Year	Title	Role	Notes	Ref.
1996	Hotel de Love	Emma Andrews		
1996	Black Sun	Maddy	Short	
2006	Superman Returns	Hospital Nurse		
2007	Long Road to Heaven	Liz Thompson		
2007	The Final Winter	Emma Henderson		
2009	Off the Beat	Enid Jones	Short	
2014	Breath	Doctor	Short	
2016	En Passant	Mother	Short	
2017	The Kindness of Strangers	Wife	Short	
2017	Event Zero	Bree Parker		
2019	Guilt	Kristina	Post-production	
2023	Contagion of Fear	Bree		

=== Television ===
Raelee Hill television credits
Year	Title	Role	Notes	Ref.
1993	Paradise Beach	Loretta Taylor		
1994	Blue Heelers	Jill Lambert	Episode: "Day in Court	
1994–1995	Neighbours	Serendipity Gottlieb	Series regular	
1996	Blue Heelers	Jamie Bennett	Episode: "Sex and Death"	
1996	Shark Bay	Heather	Main role	
1997–1999	Water Rats	Const. Tayler Johnson	Main role (series 2–4)	
2000	BeastMaster	Sella	Episode: "The Golden Phoenix"	
2001	My Brother Jack	Sheila Meredith	Television film	
2002	The Lost World	Brywik	Episode: "A Witch's Calling"	
2002–2003	Farscape	Sikozu Svala Shanti Sugaysi Shanu	Supporting role (series 4)	
2004	Farscape: The Peacekeeper Wars	Sikozu Svala Shanti Sugaysi Shanu	Television miniseries	
2005	Blue Water High	Lucy	Episode: "Timing Is Everything"	
2009	Packed to the Rafters	Lucy	Episode: "Having It All"	
2011	Rescue: Special Ops	Helen Hillerstrom	Episode: "Missing Pieces"	
2016	Janet King	Maureen	Episode: "In Plain Sight"	
2017	Home and Away	Annie Banks	Episode 6637	
2022	After the Verdict	Belinda	Recurring	
