= David Franklin (actor) =

Australian actor

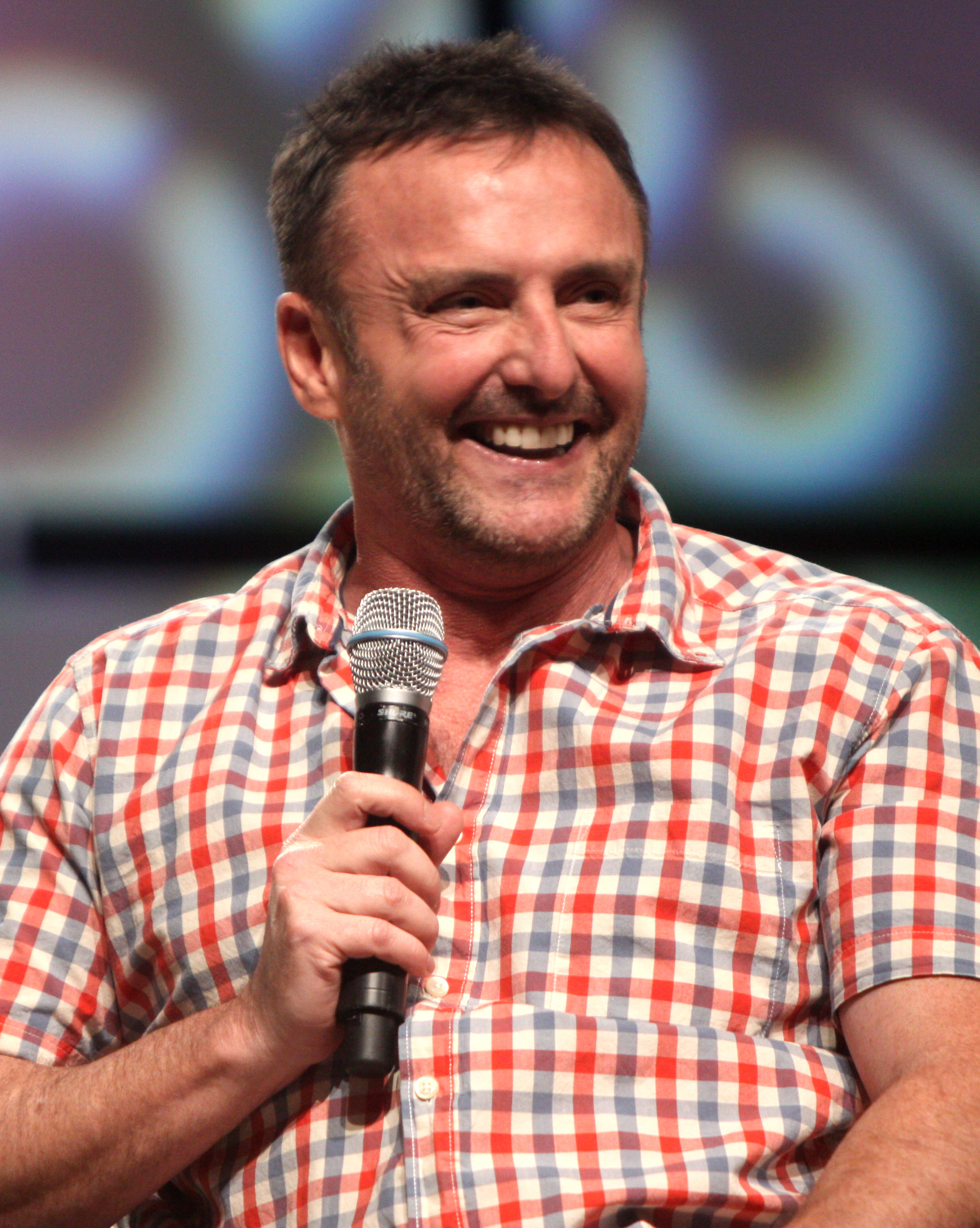
- David Franklin in 2013.
- Occupation: Actor
- Years active: 1977–present

David Franklin is an Australian actor best known to audiences for his roles as Miklo Braca in the science fiction TV series Farscape and as Brutus in Xena: Warrior Princess.

Along with Farscape and Xena, his film appearances also include Crocodile Dundee in Los Angeles and The Matrix Reloaded.

== Filmography ==
=== Film ===
Year	Title	Role	Notes
1979	My Brilliant Career	Horance	
1982	Early Frost	David Prentice	
1987	Rock 'N' Roll Cowboys		Television film
1988	Shame	Danny Fiske	
1992	Survive the Savage Sea	Wally	Television film
1992	The Distant Home	TV reporter	Television film
1993	The Flood: Who Will Save Our Children?	Dave Villareal	Television film
1997	Violet's Visit	Pete	
1997	Fable	Mal	Television film
1997	Reprisal	Freddy	Television film
1999	The Missing	Father O'Brien	
2000	Walk the Talk	Trevor Whitney	
2001	Crocodile Dundee in Los Angeles	Assistant Director	
2002	The Crocodile Hunter: Collision Course	CIA Agent	
2003	The Matrix Reloaded	Maitre D'	
2005	Conversations with Other Women	Bartender in Bar	
2007	Girl Cousins	Stage Manager Dave	Direct-to-video
2007	Ben 10: Race Against Time	Heatblast (voice)	Television film
2009	Nobody Knows		
2012	Annie and the Gypsy		
2014	Vultures in the Void	Lucky Mike	Short film

=== Television ===
Year	Title	Role	Notes
1977	The Restless Years	Bernie Harper	
1978	Loss of Innocence		
1979	Chopper Squad		Episode: "The Big Trip"
1982, 1984, 1993	A Country Practice	David, Tim Webb, Lionel Henderson	6 episodes
1988	Richmond Hill	Peter Higgs	
1990	The Flying Doctors	Terry Malloy	Episode: "Break Away"
1991	Police Rescue	Manager	Episode: "Saving the Princess"
1992	Cluedo	Tom Branchflower	Episode: "Hush, Hush, Sweet Scarlett"
1993	Time Trax	Fredric	2 episodes
1995	G.P.	Andrew Thornton	Episode: "Promise of Tomorrow"
1995	Blue Murder	Glen Flack	Episode Two: Two Dogs narrated by Neddy Smith
1996	Water Rats	Detective Snr. Const. Chris Theodorou	2 episodes
1996	Heartbreak High	Justin	Episode: "Episode #4.12"
1997	Murder Call	Jonah Balzan	Episode: "Dead and Gone"
1999–2000	Xena: Warrior Princess	Brutus	4 episodes
2000–2003	Farscape	Miklo Braca	24 episodes
2000, 2008	All Saints	Michael Politus, Alex Riordan	2 episodes
2004	Farscape: The Peacekeeper Wars	Miklo Braca	
2007	The Young and the Restless	Andrew Rhyme	6 episodes
2011	Crownies	Sean Gardiner	5 episodes

=== Video games ===
Year	Title	Role	Notes
2011	Dead Island	Additional Voices	
2014	Game of Thrones	Master Ortengryn	
2017	Halo Wars 2	Additional Voices	
