= Anthony Simcoe =

Australian actor (born 1969)

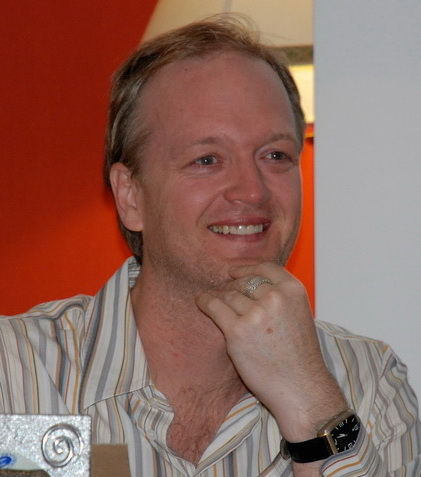
- Anthony Simcoe at Deepcon 2006
- Born: 7 June 1969 (age 56); Sydney, New South Wales, Australia

Anthony Simcoe (born 7 June 1969) is an Australian actor. He is best known for his portrayal of Ka D'Argo in the science fiction television series Farscape.

== Early life and education ==
Simcoe is a graduate of the National Institute of Dramatic Arts in Sydney. He holds an MFA in Drama, specialising in actor training.

== Career ==
=== Acting ===
Simcoe gained international fame when he was cast as Ka D'Argo in Farscape.. He portrayed the role in all four seasons of the series as well as the miniseries Farscape: The Peacekeeper Wars.

He has appeared in several other television series, including Chameleon. He also made appearance in the 2003 short film Syntax Error.

=== Music ===
Simcoe co-founded and performed in the band Signal Room, along with actor/drummer Wayne Pygram, guitarist Stephen Edwards and bass guitarist Gerry Kortegast. The band was formed during the filming of Farscape, which also featured Pygram. The band toured the United States in 2002, 2004, and 2006, and recorded three extended plays, which were produced by Tim Whitten.

== Recognition and awards ==
Simcoe was nominated for a Saturn Award for Best Supporting Actor in a Television Series in 2002 for his work on Farscape.

== Filmography ==
Anthony Simcoe film and television credits
| Year | Title | Role | Notes | Ref. |
|---|---|---|---|---|
| 1997 | The Castle | Steve Kerrigan | Theatrical film | |
| 1999–2003 | Farscape | Ka D'Argo | Regular role | |
| 2001, 2002 | Beastmaster | Milos | 2 episodes | |
| 2003 | Marking Time | Scott Seaton | Television miniseries | |
| 2003 | Syntax Error | Steve | Short film | |
| 2004 | Farscape: The Peacekeeper Wars | Ka D'Argo | 2 episodes | |
| 2005 | The Alice | Melvyn Knigh | Episode 1:19 | |
| 2006 | Solo | Jim | Film | |
| 2008 | Nim's Island | First Mate | Film | |
| 2009 | Rogue Nation | Major George Johnston | Episode 1:1 | |
| 2009 | Underbelly: A Tale of Two Cities | Danny Chubb | 2 episodes | |
| 2014 | The Inbetweeners 2 | Ken Webster | Theatrical film | |
