= List of Farscape characters =

Season 2 cast, from left to right: Bialar Crais, Rygel (front), Chiana, Zhaan, Aeryn Sun, John Crichton, Ka D'Argo.

The television series Farscape features an extensive cast of characters created by Rockne S. O'Bannon. The series is set aboard a living spacecraft named Moya of the Leviathan race. The physical, racial and species-specific cultural characteristics, as well as underlying mythological/sociological similarities and differences of the alien races portrayed in Farscape were conceptualised and created by Jim Henson's Creature Shop.

== Main characters ==
=== John Crichton ===
John Robert Crichton Jr. /ˈkraɪtən/, played by Ben Browder, is an International Aeronautics and Space Administration (most commonly referred to on the show as IASA) astronaut who, in the opening few minutes of the pilot episode, is accidentally catapulted through a wormhole across the universe, thus; setting the scene for the show as a whole. As the only regularly appearing human on the show, he is the main focus and is the main character as he narrates the weekly credits and is the only character to appear in every episode. Along with Michael Shanks's character of Daniel Jackson in Stargate SG-1, Browder's Crichton has been called one of the sexiest male characters in science fiction.

Although Crichton is a heroic and unwaveringly loyal character, he is also a mischievously comical one, so much so that he is the primary source of humor for the series. The show derives much of its humor from Crichton's habitual (and extensive) use of Earth-related pop culture references, often used as witty mockery in the face of danger or opponents who, being unfamiliar with the references, are unaware that they are being insulted. Although an occasional reference will provoke curiosity or confusion to his friends, Crichton's fellow shipmates are largely unaffected by these comments because they simply assume them to be native Earth terms that cannot be interpreted by translator microbes and merely extrapolate the meaning from its context.

Information about John Crichton's life before the first episode is only revealed slowly over the course of the series. He was the middle child born to Jack (an astronaut) and Leslie Crichton. He has two sisters, Olivia (his younger sister) and an older sister, Susan. He has a childhood friend named Douglas "D.K." Knox. John's mother died of cancer four years before his Farscape One accident. John Crichton followed in his father's footsteps by becoming an astronaut, flew on two missions prior to the Farscape incident and was Mission Commander on one of those missions.

In the first episode of season one, during a test flight designed to prove a scientific theory concerning the use of planetary gravity as a means for spaceship acceleration, a wormhole appears, and John and his "Farscape One" module are pulled into and through it. On his exit from the wormhole, he finds himself in the middle of a spaceship dogfight, during which he accidentally causes the death of Tauvo Crais, the brother of Peacekeeper captain Bialar Crais. Crichton's craft is pulled aboard a large spaceship named Moya, a Leviathan (a biomechanoid, i.e., a "living ship") where John meets his first aliens (Zhaan, D'Argo, Aeryn Sun and Rygel). Shortly after, John meets Bialar Crais, who wants revenge for his brother's death. John has to adapt quickly to a life with aliens, guns, and space travel, without the comfort of Earth culture. Toward the end of season one, Crichton encounters a mysterious alien race known only as The Ancients, who hide a repository of wormhole knowledge into his brain to guide him home, beginning a series-long chase by a Sebacean-Scarran hybrid Peacekeeper called Scorpius who hunts John and the rest of the Farscape crew to obtain that information.

Early in season two, Crichton learns that Scorpius has implanted a neural chip into his head, which causes hallucinations of a "neural clone" of Scorpius, whom he dubs "Harvey". These hallucinations influence Crichton in an effort to get at the hidden wormhole knowledge. As a result, Crichton's behavior grows more erratic and unpredictable, even as he continues to have romantic feelings for Aeryn Sun. In the end of Season 2, the neural chip takes complete control over Crichton (resulting in a Scorpius/Crichton mixed personality with extremely dark humor) and transmits a message to Scorpius. Shortly after that Harvey defeats Aeryn in an aerial dogfight and seemingly kills her. After Aeryn's death, Crichton regains control. The chip is removed, but stolen by Scorpius. With the beginning of Season three, Harvey still remains in Crichton's head and Aeryn has been revived by Zhaan, who consequently dies a few episodes later. Sometime thereafter Crichton is "twinned" by another alien; neither of the Crichtons can be called a copy, but are "equal and original" (and each has his own "Harvey") eventually, the crew of Moya is split across the two Leviathans, Moya and Talyn and they are subsequently separated from each other; each ship has one Crichton. The Crichton aboard Talyn begins a romantic relationship with Aeryn while the Crichton on Moya continues studying wormholes, helped by the repository in his brain. Jack the Ancient finds the Talyn Crichton, forcibly extracts Harvey and unlocks the wormhole knowledge, but this Crichton later dies of radiation poisoning from a wormhole weapon. When the survivors of the two crews are reunited, Aeryn (in her grief) is very cold to the remaining Crichton, due to him having different memories about the last few months; the crew members of Moya start going their separate ways at the end of season three. Just after Aeryn Sun leaves Crichton, seemingly for good, he learns that she is pregnant with his child (whether the child belongs to the Moya Crichton or the Talyn Crichton is left unknown).

Early season four leaves Crichton with nothing but time to work on his wormhole theories. He eventually reunites with the crew members of Moya, and Aeryn and Scorpius, who has fallen out of favor with Peacekeeper high command. Shortly, after arrival, Scorpius offers to remove Harvey. Due to the neural clone's longer presence within and increased familiarity with Crichton, Harvey's reaction includes persuasion and appeal to sympathy rather than threats. Crichton still agrees to allow Scorpius to remove the lingering neural spillover. Halfway through the season, Crichton finds his way back to Earth, but he voluntarily gives up the dream of Earth and returns to Moya. After a series of dangerous events (including Harvey's resurrection) Crichton and Aeryn find time alone together. Aeryn tells him he is the father of her child and Crichton proposes to her. The moment she accepts, an alien craft melts the two and ends the season.

Crichton and Aeryn are revived at the beginning of Farscape: The Peacekeeper Wars mini-series, and Crichton uses his wormhole knowledge to successfully force a peace treaty between the warring Peacekeepers and Scarrans. The wormhole knowledge in his brain is finally removed by Einstein the Ancient. During the mini-series, Aeryn gives birth to their son, named D'Argo Sun-Crichton in honor of their late comrade.

=== Aeryn Sun ===
Aeryn Sun /ˈɛərɪn ˈsʊn/, played by Claudia Black, is a former Peacekeeper pilot and officer. Although she appears to be human, she is in fact Sebacean, a species indistinguishable from humans in external appearance. At the time John Crichton appears through a wormhole in the beginning of the series, Aeryn is in her Prowler battling to retake the Leviathan Moya which has been seized by escaping prisoners Ka D'Argo, Rygel and Pa'u Zotoh Zhaan.

However, Aeryn's Prowler is caught up in the stream of Moya's starburst and is towed along with the escaping Leviathan. Aeryn is brought on board Moya as a prisoner, but when she and Crichton encounter her commanding officer, Bialar Crais, she defends John from Crais' allegation that John deliberately attacked and killed Crais' brother, saying he is not brave enough or smart enough to have done so. In return, Crais declares her to be "irreversibly contaminated" from spending too much time with an unknown life form, which means a death sentence. John Crichton and D'Argo soon escape the Peacekeepers again and, having nowhere else to go, Aeryn reluctantly becomes a fugitive alongside them.

Aboard Moya, Aeryn learns to think beyond the strict, militaristic confines of her Peacekeeper upbringing. Born in service aboard a command Carrier, it is the only life she has known and thus she is very skilled in hand-to-hand combat and armed combat. She also becomes a valuable and important member of Moya's crew, and a companion and romantic interest of Crichton during the series. It is only after leaving the Peacekeepers that she can begin to find out about her parentage. She has discovered that her mother, Xhalax Sun was also a Peacekeeper pilot who — against Peacekeeper regulations — fell in love with an older officer, Talyn Lyczac. They deliberately had Aeryn, a child born of love, and Xhalax sneaked into Aeryn's dormitory one night to tell her so, which is strictly against regulations. To redeem her crime, Xhalax was forced by the Peacekeepers to choose between the two, and she executed Talyn so that Aeryn could live.

Aeryn evolves from a cold, detached soldier into a valuable friend and crewmate. Her relationship with John Crichton also evolves, and Aeryn ultimately becomes a compassionate wife and loving mother at the end of the series. They name their son D'Argo Sun-Crichton; after their dear friend who (apparently) lost his life in the Peacekeeper Wars.

=== Ka D'Argo ===
Ka D'Argo (called simply D'Argo), played by Anthony Simcoe, is a Luxan warrior who was imprisoned aboard the Leviathan Moya by the Peacekeepers after being convicted (falsely) of killing his Sebacean wife Lo'Laan in a fit of Luxan Hyper-Rage. During his time as a prisoner, the Peacekeepers shackled D'Argo in his cell with heavy chains attached to a pair of metal hooks surgically implanted around his collarbones to keep him under control despite his strength. He later escaped (along with Rygel and Zhaan). As a Luxan warrior, D'Argo carries a weapon known as a Qualta Blade, a heavy broadsword that can transform into a Qualta Rifle. His personality in Season 1 was paranoid and ill-tempered against his friends (in the fourth episode, D'Argo puts on a Tavlek gauntlet that injects a stimulant so "stimulating" his personality that D'Argo attempted to take command of Moya and kill all those who stand against him). He has a powerful, fast tongue that he can use to attack in a manner similar to that of a frog or chameleon. The tip can inject an "adaptive" venom which renders the target unconscious without killing them. Though he is suspicious of Crichton at first due to his resemblance to the Peacekeepers, the two eventually develop a brotherly bond and Crichton nicknames him "Big D."

Throughout the first half of the series, D'Argo's consuming desire was to find Jothee, his son by Lo'Laan. After Jothee was found, his plans to settle down with his son and Chiana scared the Nebari girl, resulting in her betraying him by having sex with Jothee. D'Argo and Jothee part on bad terms in "Suns and Lovers", but they are later reunited and somewhat reconciled in the miniseries. D'Argo and Chiana's relationship is subsequently tense, but they can at least maintain an amicable association as crewmates. After being mortally wounded in The Peacekeeper Wars, D'Argo covers the escape of his comrades off Qujaga, which was then destroyed by Crichton's wormhole weapon. John Crichton and Aeryn Sun then name their son, born during the battle, D'Argo, in his memory.

The episode "Unrealized Reality" features a character from another universe who is a composite of D'Argo and Rygel.

The character appeared in other media. In Horizons, a story by creator Rockne S O'Bannon that takes place far in the future, and that was written before Peacekeeper War, D'Argo is still alive. However, he did lose his arm, which is now a clear prosthetic. D'Argo was also parodied by the character Teal'c in the Stargate SG-1 episode "200".

=== Zhaan ===
Pa'u Zotoh Zhaan, played by Virginia Hey, is a Delvian, a blue, spiritual, humanoid plant species, and a Pa'u (priestess) in their religious order. Zhaan was imprisoned aboard Moya for the assassination of the leader of the Delvian government and her lover, Bitaal. Bitaal refused to step down as leader of the Delvian people when his tenure was over. He, along with other conservative Pa'us, hired the Peacekeepers for "external security." There was a political crackdown and it is implied that some atrocities occurred under Bitaal's rule. Zhaan, while in Unity (an erotic, if not entirely sexual, activity unique to Delvians) with Bitaal, killed him and drove herself insane in the process. It is unclear whether Zhaan was a member of a terrorist group or whether she acted alone. It is clear, however, that Zhaan was courted by a violent revolutionary organization of Pa'us on a planet they encountered in the Uncharted Territories. She has also been an anarchist, and like other trained Delvians, Zhaan has several empathic and telepathic abilities which she cultivated to Pa'u level during her time in prison on Moya, although she was forced to channel these abilities to cause harm during the crew's first confrontation with the powerful Maldis in order to stop him and save the currently-imprisoned Crichton. She is also skilled in medicine and other related sciences. During her time aboard Moya, she is often seen making drugs and explosives in her workshop to assist her shipmates.

As a Pa'u, Zhaan's spiritual abilities significantly improve upon achieving a new level. When first introduced, Zhaan is a level nine Pa'u, with the ability to lessen the pain of others by taking some portion of it into herself. Later in the series with Crichton's help, she gains a level, becoming a level ten Pa'u and gaining the ability to protect others from psychic attack with her own mind. In the episode "Bone to Be Wild" she shows that for short periods of time she can make herself invisible, although it is not stated whether or not this is only possible when surrounded by foliage.

Towards the beginning of the third season, Zhaan saved the seemingly dead Aeryn Sun, and in the process became critically ill herself. While the crew are searching for a planet with the right conditions for Zhaan to heal, John Crichton diverts Moya to investigate a wormhole instead, where the Leviathan collides with another spacecraft. In order to save Moya and her crew, Zhaan sacrifices herself by piloting the other craft away before it is destroyed.

In real life, Virginia Hey left the show because of health problems related to the extensive makeup and demanding work schedule. She still reappeared as Zhaan in two fourth-season episodes, "John Quixote" and "Unrealized Reality"; series director Rowan Woods also made an on-screen appearance as a male virtual reality incarnation in "John Quixote", and Zhaan appears in archive footage in The Peacekeeper Wars. Hey's voice was used in the Aeryn-focused episode "The Choice", the seventeenth episode of the third season.

=== Rygel ===
Dominar Rygel XVI (called simply Rygel) was once the royal ruler of the Hynerian Empire. He is known for being selfish and collects anything valuable, and was one of two regular puppet characters on the show. Rygel was operated by John Eccleston, Sean Masterson, Tim Mieville, Matt McCoy, Mario Halouvas and Fiona Gentle. His voice was provided by Jonathan Hardy.

Rygel has a long history. After ruling for an unknown number of years as Dominar of the Hynerians, he was overthrown by his cousin Bishan. After the overthrow, which occurred over 130 cycles (years) before the events of Farscape, he became a prisoner of the Peacekeepers. During this time, he was imprisoned in several places and tortured, most notably by Selto Durka, captain of the near-legendary ship, the Zelbinion, and was eventually transferred to Moya. Due to his size and cunning, he is able not only to leave his cell at will, but also to organize and carry out a revolt among the other prisoners placed on Moya, allowing them to escape Peacekeeper control. After the escape (i.e., during the series), Rygel is shown to be cunning and resourceful but also focused almost entirely on his own personal goals and wealth. As time goes on, his egocentric attitude becomes less prevalent and he warms to his role as a member of Moya's crew. A recurring gag in Farscape involves him flatulating helium when he gets nervous, causing everyone's voices to have a higher pitch by the offensive gas. At the end of the series, Bishan pleads with him to return to help reunite their people and Rygel departs to do so with a devastated Chiana.

A parody of him was in the Stargate SG-1 episode "200" as an Asgard with a Fu-Manchu beard and mustache; his only line was the Hynerian curse "Yotz", similar in use and meaning as the Earth curse "Hell".

=== Chiana ===
Chiana, played by Gigi Edgley, is a street-smart, savvy, and mercurial character who is willing to scam or steal for an adventure and risk her life for the people she loves. Chiana is a Nebari, a grey-skinned race whose society is heavily regimented by the government (known as The Establishment). The Establishment venerates control and order, pitting Chiana's independent ways in a society all about conformity against the Nebari's ideal about "the greater good" and making her a target for government reprogramming (called "cleansing"). In her premiere episode during the middle of season 1, "Durka Returns", she successfully escapes from Nebari custody, and ends up a passenger on Moya with the rest of the crew.

Many episodes have demonstrated that she is a skilled fighter and is agile and acrobatic. She has a number of distinctive mannerisms such as cocking her head at times and crouching on objects rather than sitting or standing. Other Nebari do not exhibit the same style of physical movement, though her fluid movements and frequent situational appraisals suggest a lifetime of avoiding danger.

One of Chiana's other characteristic traits is her strong sense of individuality. She respects no authority and values her freedom more than anything or anyone else. This gives her the appearance of being promiscuous; she attempted to seduce Jothee, D'Argo's son, the present and past versions of John Crichton as well as others. Crichton and Chiana eventually develop a sibling-like bond, and he nicknames her "Pip."

In Season 2, the writers created a backstory for Chiana, along with a family member. She has one named relative, her brother Nerri, three years her senior. Along with Nerri, she escaped Nebari Prime at a young age, and then the two traveled around for some years. Nerri decided to join the resistance fighting against the Nebari leaders, and split up with Chiana so she would not be endangered by his activities. In the third season of the show, Chiana harbours hopes of meeting up with her brother and joining the resistance to reunite with him.

In Season 3, the writers created a scenario in which Chiana developed a new ability. After her encounter with an Energy Rider, Chiana began to experience precognitive visions that left her with blindness and splitting headaches. These visions later evolved into being able to see the present and future in slow motion, and each time she used this ability, the following blindness would last longer than before until she ended up completely blind at the end of season 4. Shortly before the start of Farscape: The Peacekeeper Wars, she received new eyes from a Diagnosan that allowed her to 'see' energy sources and, to an extent, see through walls.

In the episode "Durka Returns", Chiana was a thief so slippery that she evades Moya's internal sensors. She proves to be resourceful in "Nerve", distracting the Peacekeepers from John, disguising herself as a tech, manipulating Gilina and delivering Talyn.

An alternate reality version of Chiana appeared in "Unrealized Reality" and "Prayer"; in the latter episode she is killed by Scorpius, an act that disturbs Crichton because, in the alternate reality of those two episodes, she resembles Aeryn (and is played by Claudia Black).

=== Pilot ===
Pilot is a member of a race known to viewers simply as Pilots or "Servicers". He is introduced in the "Premiere" and plays a significant role in the resolution of The Peacekeeper Wars. Pilot was one of two regular animatronic puppet characters in Farscape. He is operated by Sean Masterson, Tim Mieville, Matt McCoy, Mario Halouvas and Fiona Gentle. His voice is provided by Lani Tupu (who also plays the character Captain Bialar Crais).

Moya's Pilot is only known by his species's name, which also describes his role on the ship. His real name, if he has one, is unknown. Pilots bond with biomechanical Leviathan spacecraft and become their helmsman, navigator, companion, and liaison to passengers. Once bonded, Pilots can survive only a brief period of time of separation from their Leviathans, and only when travelling in something made of a Leviathan's components (as in a transport pod). In bonding to Leviathans, Pilots sacrifice much of their life-span for the benefits of space travel, since Pilots can live well over a thousand years but Leviathans live only hundreds.

The Pilot most commonly seen in the series is Moya's second pilot. The first, a female, was shot and forcibly removed by Peacekeepers when she refused to consent to experiments being done upon Moya. With her death, the more familiar Pilot took her place, seduced by his desire to travel the stars, something that had been denied him by the elders of his race because he was still young and immature. Unwilling to allow the slow gradual bonding of Pilot and Leviathan that is normal, the Peacekeepers forcibly grafted the new Pilot into Moya's systems, an action that allowed him control over the ship but at the cost of continuous pain, until Pilot pulled free from his connections with Moya and re-bonded himself to Moya at the natural speed. The second Pilot carried the guilt of his role in the death of the first for several years.

Pilot is effectively immobile in the heart of the ship, but plays a key role in numerous adventures, and the other characters come to rely upon him as a figure of wisdom and comfort. Early in the series he is attacked and mutilated by members of the crew, as a local scientist wanted Pilot flesh in return for giving them maps to their homes. Despite this, he did not hold a grudge as he considered serving the others, whatever their needs, to simply be his role. He was most happy when helping other crew members, although as his independence grew, he could sometimes become irritated with them and would order them out of his chamber and even off the ship altogether. In the series finale, Pilot experienced a conflict with Moya where he wanted to help Crichton destroy the wormhole linking Earth to Tormented Space and Moya did not want him to. Despite this and initially stating he could do nothing, Pilot joined the mission, leaving Moya for the first time in a long time to aid Crichton's plan. Though Pilot was left weakened by his separation from Moya, he succeeded in destroying the wormhole and saving Earth, inadvertently killing the crew of a Scarren Stryker in the process. He was later rebonded with Moya.

Other Pilot characters seen briefly in the series include that of the damaged and mutilated Leviathan named Rovhu, whose limbs were repeatedly eaten and regrown by carnivorous prisoners, and the ancient Pilot of Elack, who housed Crichton when he was separated from Moya and sacrificed her quiet death in the Leviathan's Burial Ground to help Crichton escape from the Peacekeepers. Moya's child Talyn did not need a Pilot by Peacekeeper design, but nevertheless could support one.

=== Scorpius ===
Scorpius, played by Wayne Pygram, is the half-Sebacean, half-Scarran Peacekeeper, and the primary antagonist of the series, relentlessly pursuing John Crichton for the secrets of wormhole technology locked in John Crichton's unconscious mind to create a wormhole weapon. He is the product of an experiment by the Scarrans – his Sebacean mother was raped by a Scarran to see if there would be any benefit in a hybrid. Raised by Scarrans, he has come to hate them, to reject his Scarran side, and to live for revenge against them. His physical attributes and his character traits are influenced by his race. Scorpius first appeared in "Nerve" and made his last appearance in "The Peacekeeper Wars Part 2". Being half Scarran, Scorpius's body produces an extreme amount of body heat, particularly when angry. However, being also half-Sebacean means that too much heat will kill him. To prevent this he wears a full-body cooling suit notable mostly for the interchangeable cooling rods inside his cranium that absorb his excess body heat. He can see temperature gradients, especially of the face, allowing him to tell when people are lying, as described in the episode "Incubator".

Scorpius prides himself on his patience and his intellect. Scorpius is willing to do absolutely anything to achieve his goals, which he is very honest about when it suits him. He will (and does over the course of the series) lie, kill in cold blood, order the deaths of multitudes, torture innocents, and sacrifice those close to him to get what he wants. He is also willing to aid his enemies or humiliate himself if it will further his goals. He has returned from supposedly fatal situations more than once, which he credits to his "foresight and preparation". He manipulates others to do his work but does much on his own; his obsession with Crichton and his wormhole secrets is proof of that. He is highly educated and extremely intelligent, and exercises remarkable ingenuity. Only he knows how deep his schemes run and, while he claims his main desire is to eliminate the Scarran threat, protagonist John Crichton is loath to ever trust him.

His rank is never mentioned, and it is assumed that he does not officially hold one. Wayne Pygram seemed to confirm this during an interview on the Farscape DVD set; while Dominar Rygel XVI once claimed that Scorpius was "higher even than a captain" ("I-Yensch, You-Yensch"), the claim was made more as a boast in an attempt to inflate Scorpius's value to kidnappers. His authority is not absolute, however, as Commandant Mele-On Grayza informed him when she superseded it. During the series, he is shown to have the authority to command a research base, a command carrier, a fleet of command carriers, and an even larger fleet in Farscape: The Peacekeeper Wars. However, the exact Peacekeeper ranks at this level have never been established in the show.

Despite being an antagonist for the first three seasons, Scorpius joins the crew of Moya for the final season to protect Crichton after his Command Carrier is destroyed and he is hunted by the Peacekeepers. He becomes a more or less trustworthy crewmember though he looks for any chance to get Crichton's knowledge and forms a relationship with Sikozu. At the end of the series, he returns to the Peacekeepers and in The Peacekeeper Wars, instigates a war between them and the Scarrens. At the end of The Peacekeeper Wars he finally gets what he wants when Crichton uses a wormhole weapon on the Scarrens and Peacekeepers and is horrified, calling it "madness", finally understanding the danger of what he sought. He is last seen on Moya smiling as the Scarrens and Peacekeepers sign a peace treaty.

==== Harvey ====
Harvey is a neural clone of Scorpius and exists solely in the head of John Crichton. He was also played by Wayne Pygram. Harvey is the result of a neural chip that was placed into Crichton's brain by Scorpius after the Aurora Chair failed to reveal the wormhole information he was after. His name, given to him by Crichton, is taken from either the Mary Chase play Harvey, in which Harvey is an invisible six-foot, one-and-a-half-inch tall rabbit that only Elwood P. Dowd can see, or the popular film versions, both starring Jimmy Stewart (1950; 1972). Harvey first appeared in "Crackers Don't Matter" and had his last appearance in The Peacekeeper Wars Part 2.

Harvey's purpose is threefold: he is to unlock the wormhole knowledge stored somewhere in Crichton's brain, protect Crichton's life until Scorpius manages to retrieve the chip, and prevent Crichton from hurting or killing Scorpius. Harvey also has the ability to stop Crichton's brain functions for a short time, making him appear dead. He can control Crichton's memory and nervous system when the chip is in place, which he uses to hide his presence from Crichton. Eventually, the chip becomes strong enough to completely dominate Crichton's mind and body. Even after the chip is removed, Harvey is able to exert limited control over Crichton. After Scorpius reprograms him, Harvey has some type of mental link to Scorpius that allows Scorpius to track Crichton down after John is revived from his crystallization by the Eidelons. Harvey contains much of Scorpius's knowledge and intellect.

In Season 2, Harvey is discovered. He is basically a menacing hallucination of Scorpius that influences Crichton to become more erratic, unpredictable and similar to Scorpius. He is capable of killing Crichton and does his best to make sure that Crichton would not go against Scorpius's ideas. In the end of Season 2, Harvey dominates Crichton (resulting in a mixed personality with dark humor), murders his love Aeryn Sun (whom the mixed personality also is attracted to) and transmits a message to Scorpius. After that, Crichton regains control, the chip is removed and stolen by Scorpius.

In Season 3, Harvey discovers that even though the chip was removed, he has blended with Crichton's subconscious and is trapped there forever without any of his previous powers. He attempts to manipulate John to commit suicide, but fails. Crichton is rescued and the only thing Harvey can do is give advice. Everything goes "fine" until John is twinned by a madman, twinning Harvey as well.

Black Harvey, who goes to Talyn with his Crichton, advises to John to not trust the Ancient Jack. He also points out that Scorpius did not copy his module, but that it was Furlow who also had the sketchy wormhole data Crichton had in early Season 1. Talyn was quickly taken to Furlow's desert planet, but it was no longer inhabited. Charrids, the collaborators of Scarrans, had overrun Furlow's mechanic lab though. Furlow indeed had made progress and the Scarrans soon got the data. To destroy the Dreadnought, Jack began building a wormhole weapon. To make sure Harvey would not get the unlocked data, Jack decided to destroy him. Harvey angrily opposed, but was "mortally wounded" nonetheless. In his last minutes, he took control over the unconscious Crichton and attempted to manipulate Aeryn to shoot him, claiming Crichton was dead. He failed and his last words were: "A soldier must not be weak. Weakness means defeat."

Green Harvey faced death when John Crichton was attacked by Ka D'Argo in Luxan hyper-rage. John's reasons to live (Earth, dad, pizza, sex, cold beer, fast cars, sex, Aeryn, love) were not adequate so Harvey proposed revenge. To discover a reason to live, Crichton created a cartoon reality to oppose an illusory D'Argo. To combat him, Pilot proposed to run from him, Jool proposed to try to talk to him, Chiana proposed to fight him. All failed. Crichton went with Harvey's idea after being clinically dead for a time and it worked. But Crichton's idea, love, worked best. After that, Harvey unlocked Noranti's subliminal message: "Aeryn is pregnant". Crichton got the message after Aeryn left and at once decided to retrieve her. Unfortunately, after that, Moya was sucked down by a wormhole, leaving Crichton stranded. After Crichton returned to the ship, Scorpius asked for asylum. Harvey suggested killing him. Scorpius proposed to erase Harvey. Since this Harvey had been in Crichton far longer than his twin, Crichton hesitated, but eventually agreed. Harvey was removed. After Crichton and Scorpius had allied and Crichton broke the agreement and left the hybrid to die, Harvey was "resurrected" and improved to Harvey 2.0. He was loyal to Scorpius and had a connection with him so Scorpius would know he was alive. After Scorpius was rescued thanks to Harvey's lies, a war between Scarrans and Peacekeepers broke out and Crichton finally created the wormhole weapon. Harvey was deleted after his success, since his purpose was finally fulfilled. His last words were: "Goodbye John. Thanks... for your memories"

After the chip was removed, it was discovered by Scorpius that although his neural clone had blended into Crichton, the opposite happened in the chip. A neural clone of John Crichton existed within it. And since there were encryptions to the wormhole data, only he could unlock them. Scorpius showed him his violent past with the Scarrans and did everything to convince him, but the Crichton clone claimed he had already lost everything. After Crichton refused to give him the data he needed, his anger's Scarran heat destroyed the chip and killed him. His last words were: "You think that neural clones go to heaven? Well, wherever I wind up, when I see your mama, I'll be sure to give her your regards!" According to the show's executive producer David Kemper, the idea for Harvey came from a necessity to have the character of Scorpius more visible during the show. As the show's main villain, he needed to be a constant and viable threat. After seeing a hallucinated Scorpius interact with Crichton in the second season's fourth episode, "Crackers Don't Matter", they came up with the idea of putting Scorpius inside of John's head. The clone's presence was hinted at in the second and third episodes of the "Look at the Princess" trilogy as well as in "Beware of Dog" before his presence was revealed outright to Crichton in the season's 15th episode, "Won't Get Fooled Again". However, this then became an example of dramatic irony, as Crichton's memory of Harvey was erased, until he was revealed again.

=== Bialar Crais ===
Bialar Crais, played by Lani Tupu, was the series' original antagonist throughout season 1. The series' creator, Rockne O'Bannon, named the character after his friend, contemporary mystery novelist Robert Crais.

Bialar Crais was born in a Sebacean farming community, but while still a boy, he and his younger brother Tauvo were taken from their family and conscripted into the Peacekeeper military. As they were hauled away, Crais' father charged him to look after his younger brother, which was a major burden for Crais. When the human John Crichton accidentally followed a wormhole into the midst of a Peacekeeper battle at the beginning of the series, the younger Crais was killed. For the course of the show's first season, Crais scoured the Uncharted Territories for Crichton and Moya, obsessed with finding the man he blamed for his brother's death. In the eighth episode, an evil entity named Maldis transports Crais and Crichton into a labyrinth forcing them to duel to the death. Crichton eventually wins, but Maldis quickly gets rid of Crais and tells Crichton his plan was to get Crais into a frenzy so he'd bring his Command Carrier further in the Uncharted Territories for a "carnage on a truly massive scale". While Maldis is defeated by Zhaan, his plan worked nonetheless. Crais disobeys direct orders from High Command, continues the hunt and brutally murders his own lieutenant who is the only member of his crew aware of the order to return to High Command. When Scorpius gets hold of Crichton months later in the end of the first season, Crais joins Scorpius in interrogating Crichton in the Aurora Chair. Eventually, following a false memory, Crais is put in the chair and becomes bitter in the process, especially after he discovers that Scorpius will come with him on the Command Carrier (Scorpius was aware of Crais's crimes). Eventually, Scorpius slowly usurped Crais's position and after a physical fight with the menacing hybrid, Crais realizes that he will soon have to face the consequences of his decisions for the past cycle. He helps the crew of Moya escape and is granted asylum. During the second season, Bialar quickly forms a bond with Moya's offspring, Talyn. Crais finds Talyn difficult to control, but he becomes neurally linked to Talyn and they leave Moya. Crais and Talyn later again cross paths with Moya and her crew after Talyn hears a call of distress from his mother. In the penultimate episode of Season 3, Crais uses Talyn to perform a suicidal Starburst inside Scorpius's command carrier to finally have his vengeance against the horrid hybrid. This heroic act of self-sacrifice effectively destroys the Peacekeeper wormhole project, and Talyn and Crais along with it.

Crais makes a few appearances after his death. An alternate version of Crais appears in "Unrealized Realities". In this reality, Crichton is a Peacekeeper agent working for Crais, and after Crichton kills Moya's crew, Crais congratulates him for a job well done. In "John Quixote", Crais appears as an ogre in a virtual reality game. Crais also appears in The Peacekeeper Wars in archive footage.

=== Stark ===
Stark, played by Paul Goddard, is Stykera, a specialized subrace of the Banik. He is introduced to the series late in the first season and became a main character during the third season, before disappearing at the end of it and only returning at the end of the fourth season; he played a major part in The Peacekeeper Wars mini-series.

Stark wears a half-mask - strapped to his head by two separate buckles - of an unidentified metal, covering an incorporeal area that glows dark orange when uncovered, on the right side of his face (roughly his eye and cheek-bone) that he only reveals when he is taking away someone's pain or "crossing over" a soul—aiding or comforting a person in the moments prior to their death. However, in doing so, Stark absorbs a small fragment of the soul - and thus the knowledge and lingering emotions - of the person he "crosses over" into his own psyche, something which might explain his somewhat unbalanced mental behaviour (although his undergoing months of torture may have even more to do with it). In addition, by virtue of being a Stykera, Stark can ease the pain and suffering of others, one of the traits that made him sought after for Scorpius' Aurora Chair research.

Stark initially came into contact with John Crichton while both were being held prisoner in Scorpius's first Gammak Base devoted primarily to wormhole research. Having been a prisoner for many years, Stark informs Crichton that his (Stark's) survival is due both to his resistance to the effects of the Aurora chair and his pretense of acting mentally unbalanced in front of the guards, which causes them to leave him alone more often. Stark assists Crichton in his escape to Moya and quickly forms a bond with Zhaan. During one of the crew's misadventures, they are put on trial for murder and Stark is executed by "dispersion" or the scattering of his molecules into atoms. He survives this because he is mostly made of energy, but his appearances thereafter show him as being more uneven in his personality.

After the crew robs the Shadow Depository and Zhaan confronts a lethal illness, he becomes genuinely disturbed and wrought with grief over her death. He joins up with the crew of Talyn but frequently is at odds with his desire to "save" others, which eventually alienates Aeryn and Crais. Feeling that Zhaan is calling out to him, he eventually parts ways with the crew to search for her spirit. He is later found a prisoner on Katratzi which had been part of the reason Scorpius held him prisoner: he was searching for it and Stark knew where it was from "crossing over" Scarrans. He is rescued by Rygel and Noranti and rejoins Moya's crew. During The Peacekeeper Wars, he is forced to "cross over" the Eidolon leader and thus gains his knowledge of the Eidolon powers, something that makes Stark almost crazy. He later transfers the knowledge and regains his usual personality. At the end of the series, Stark finds a measure of peace and leaves his mask with Crichton, revealing that the energy beneath it is now gone.

As the series progresses, three different alternate 'versions' of Stark are seen: as a not-quite-sane Gamesmaster in a twisted virtual-reality style game ("John Quixote"), a fused Stark/Sikozu character witnessed in an alternate reality ("Unrealized Reality"/"Prayer") and played by Raelee Hill, and as a convincing bioloid replica of himself ("We're So Screwed Part II: Hot to Katratzi").

== Supporting characters ==
=== Jool ===
Joolushko Tunai Fenta Hovalis, played by Tammy MacIntosh, is a young Interion woman of remarkable academic achievement. She had her first appearance in "Self-Inflicted Wounds Part I: Could'a, Would'a, Should'a", and her last in "The Peacekeeper Wars Part 1".

While on vacation with her two male cousins—they were traveling around the galaxy to celebrate her birthday—they ran into some trouble. Her two cousins contracted a fatal disease, and they and she were frozen into stasis to be used for organ donation by a Diagnosan. This Diagnosan was later able to remove John Chrichton's neural chip, though the procedure required removing some of his brain and replacing it with a closely related donor species. Interons, like Jool, had the closest physiological match to a human brain, and Crichton reluctantly was saved through a donation by one of her cousins. He later took her and her other cousin's stasis capsules with him onto Moya. Her cousin died almost immediately upon being released from stasis, but Jool, who had not been sick, was fine. She awoke to find herself aboard the Leviathan Moya and discovered that she had been frozen for 22 cycles.

Prior to Jool's first appearance one of her cousins, who was revived shortly before his death, referred to her as Jool rather than her full name. John Crichton originated the shortened nickname "Jool" on-board Moya, and though she resented it at first, it soon grew on her, as did he. While an intelligent young woman, Jool has led a sheltered life, and though she possesses a lot of knowledge, it was rarely practiced before joining the crew who soon became her friends. Jool comes from a peaceful star system far away, and before meeting Rygel, she had not known Hynerians existed, though Sebaceans are familiar to her. When frightened or nervous, her orange hair (which sheds) turns red and her high-frequency screams can melt metal, an ability which proves useful on several occasions. Her arrival aboard Moya came with the loss of Pa'u Zotoh Zhaan, and the crew and fans alike were a little slow in accepting the new character.

The crew parted ways and Jool and D'Argo found themselves on Arnessk, where Jool became acquainted with other Interions and helped in their excavation of the site. She helped John, D'Argo and Chiana to free the priests from 12,000-cycle-long sleep in suspended animation. A scholar of Arnesskian history, Jool left Moya after over a cycle with the crew to follow her new destiny and help the priests adjust to the new life that lay ahead of them. In Farscape: The Peacekeeper Wars, Moya returned to Arnessk, where the crew were briefly reunited with Jool who, for reasons never explained, had adopted a more Sheena, Queen of the Jungle-like persona. Moya, however, had been followed by the Scarrans who deployed a weapon which destroyed the temple. Jool was inside and is presumed dead.

An alternate reality version of Jool, encountered in "Unrealized Reality" and "Prayer", was portrayed by Anthony Simcoe. This version is reluctantly shot dead by Crichton in "Prayer".

=== Moya ===
Moya is a Leviathan, a biomechanoid spacecraft. She had her first appearance in the "Premiere", and was last seen in "The Peacekeeper Wars Part 2".

Like others of her race, Moya was captured by a Peacekeeper squad at a young age and was bonded with a Pilot, who serves as the Leviathan's navigator, operator, companion, and link to the crew of the ship. Leviathans are ships of peace, and as such have no offensive capabilities. They do have an impressive defensive maneuver, however, called starburst, which allows the ship to travel at incredible speed through a tear in space-time. Moya is maintained by DRDs (Diagnostic Repair Drones), which are small, beetle-like robots that Leviathans build as they grow. They help with Moya's upkeep, by repairing and maintaining Moya. DRDs also play a major role in many of the adventures, helping John and the crew; the most notable DRDs are named 1812, One-Eye, and Pike.

Moya was once a captive of the Peacekeepers who control her and other Leviathans through the use of giant control collars placed around the ships that prevent autonomous control and inflict pain upon any disobedience. Moya and Pilot, with the help of Crichton, Zhaan, Rygel and D'Argo, manage to escape. Moya has become a friend and home to her crew and they have been through many bizarre, disheartening, and exhilarating events together. During season one, Moya becomes pregnant thanks to an accidentally released Peacekeeper experiment, and later gives birth to a Peacekeeper/Leviathan hybrid gunship that Aeryn Sun names Talyn, after her father.

Despite being only able to communicate through Pilot (with one exception), Moya has her own personality which can be seen to develop and change through the series. At the beginning of the series she is timid, starbursting to escape the slightest danger at a moment's notice. When she meets the Leviathan gods, the Builders, and they order her death for having produced Talyn, she is willing to die, and is only saved when the order is revealed to be a test for Zhaan. By the end of the second season, she is willing to join the effort to rescue Crichton from Scorpius despite her fears, and is severely damaged in the attempt. At the end of the third season, she asks the crew to kill another Leviathan who is disturbing the burial of her child's remains. And in "The Peacekeeper Wars", this previously timid and peaceful creature trusts the crew enough to allow Crichton to use her to launch the deadly Wormhole Weapon.

=== Noranti ===
Utu Noranti Pralatong (called simply Noranti), played by Melissa Jaffer, joined the crew in the Season 3 finale, "Dog with Two Bones", when she suddenly appears among them as a mysterious and eccentric refugee that escaped to Moya along with an unidentified group of others as a Peacekeeper Command Carrier was being destroyed. The "Old Woman", as she is called, is a Traskan, and little is known of her past before she joined the crew. Initially appearing to Crichton and Chiana as a grateful cook, she later describes herself as a "doctor, instructor, and among many other disciplines . . . negotiator". She is basically portrayed as an accomplished herbalist. Although her skills are sometimes not quite as successful as she would like, she does manage to come to the crew's rescue with odd potions and powders on many occasions. At times, she seems to have her own agenda, although what that agenda may be is never quite made clear. Being 293 years old, she sometimes appears to the others as being slightly senile, and is often referred to as "Grandma". She was featured throughout Season 4 of Farscape, as well as being in The Peacekeeper Wars, where she realizes the existence of more Eidelons and convinces Crichton to seek to reawaken their powers to help end the war. Noranti was additionally performed by Amanda Wenban in The Peacekeeper Wars.

An alternate reality version of Noranti appeared in the Season 4 episode, "Unrealized Reality", and was portrayed by Gigi Edgley.

=== Sikozu ===
Sikozu Svala Shanti Sugaysi Shanu (called Sikozu), played by Raelee Hill, is a Kalish who grew up in Scarran-controlled space. She first appeared in "Crichton Kicks" and made her last appearance in "The Peacekeeper Wars Part 2". She becomes an expert (albeit a book expert) on Leviathans, and eventually goes to work for a pirate group who harvest toubray (nerve) fibers from Leviathans. She meets up with Crichton while he is aboard the Leviathan Elack in the Leviathan's sacred burial space; she led the pirates there and they subsequently try to kill her to prevent her telling anyone where the burial area is. Crichton nicknames her "Sputnik" due to the shape of her hairstyle when they met. There is initial confusion at their meeting because she cannot tolerate translator microbes and so must learn all languages by hearing them. This may not be a species trait, given that she is later exposed as a Bioloid agent, and could be a consequence of that process instead. She is extremely intelligent and picks up information very quickly. She can "change her centre of gravity" so that she can walk on walls and ceilings, and she can easily reattach limbs that have been severed. She has to eat only a few times a cycle (year).

She is a self-styled polymath who belittles those around her. While her knowledge about technology, species, history, and the galaxy is vast, it is mostly academic. She is naive about how things function outside a controlled environment. Sikozu's sense of self-preservation her priority; so she is prone to changing positions based on ad hoc judgments and proximity to power. This makes her true loyalties uncertain.

Sikozu accompanies Crichton as he reunites with his crewmates from Moya, and she gradually allies herself with Scorpius, whom she initially seems intrigued by both because he saves her life and because he is arguably the most powerful and intelligent person on Moya. (He is the first mind Sikozu has known who she acknowledges as her equal or superior.) They eventually become lovers and she takes a place at his side when he is kicked off Moya. Just prior to the Scarran-Peacekeeper war, it is revealed that she is a bioloid (an android) and a double-agent. She is working with the Kalish resistance to free the Kalish from Scarran servitude, and as such was specially bioengineered to be able to hover in the air and release intense radiation heat rays from her body that destroy Scarran heat producing glands, rendering them weak and vulnerable. She is also able to direct this energy in smaller bursts via her hands when necessary. This radiation seems to still be harmful, although to a lesser degree, to Scarran hybrids such as Scorpius. When using her power in his presence, she instructs him to take cover and not to look at her.

Late in the war, it is revealed that Sikozu is a spy for the Scarran Empire in exchange for a promise from them to free her people from servitude. Scorpius assaults her after revealing his knowledge about her betrayal and leaves her to die on the water-planet, Qujaga. This development is foreshadowed in several earlier episodes: At their first meeting, Chiana thinks that Sikozu is a spy because she has Scarran currency and speaks Scarran. Sikozu explains this by saying that her people are from Scarran-controlled space. In a visit to an unrealized reality, Crichton — in that reality, a ranking Peacekeeper officer — is forced to execute Sikozu after she is revealed to be a Scarran spy.

=== Talyn ===
Talyn is a Peacekeeper/Leviathan hybrid gunship, a living spaceship that is the progeny of the Leviathan Moya. Talyn is named after Aeryn Sun's father. He first appeared in "The Hidden Memory" and made his last appearance in "Into the Lion's Den Part II: Wolf in Sheep's Clothing".

The Leviathan Moya was subjected to a hybridization experiment by the Peacekeepers while in captivity. A synthetic stimulant/conceptive was placed in her by a peacekeeper Leviathan expert called Velorek, leader of the experiment. It was accidentally released by Ka D'Argo six months after their escape from peacekeeper captivity, leading to the conception of a fetus. Roughly six months later, Moya gave birth to a baby Leviathan, though the baby was far from normal: unlike typical Leviathans, which are streamlined and have no weapons whatsoever, the infant was "covered with weapons." During the birthing process, Talyn's external weaponry caused him to become stuck in the birth canal, and he had to fire a low-yield shot from those same weapons to free himself. Shortly after his birth, he had a few disagreements with his mother and refused to talk to her. Moya felt that a Peacekeeper should talk to him. Aeryn boarded Talyn and succeeded in convincing the young Leviathan to listen to his mother. Moya asked Officer Aeryn Sun to name her offspring, and Aeryn named it after her father, Talyn.

At times, Talyn could be emotionally unstable, even going so far as to deliberately attack Moya. He also panicked easily. It is unclear whether this resulted from his violent childhood, or from errors in his genome, perhaps the result of trying to create a warship from an essentially nonaggressive species.

Talyn was a very powerful ship when young, and had he achieved maturity he would likely have been one of the most powerful ships in the galaxy. He was young (and quite childlike) for much of Farscape, and was dwarfed by his mother Moya, although he did grow gradually over the series. It was theorized by Pilot that he might even have grown larger than a normal Leviathan.

At the end of season 3 Talyn sacrificed his life to save the crew of Moya. Captured and disabled while docked inside the Peacekeeper Command Carrier that had been following the crew for three years, Talyn starburst within the carrier, causing a massive energy wave that progressively destroyed the Carrier (while leaving enough time for most of the crew to evacuate the ship). Talyn's remains were carried by Moya to the Leviathan Sacred Space region, something of an elephant graveyard of Leviathans; space they regard as holy and where they go to die. He was mourned by Moya and her crew.

Unlike other Leviathans, Talyn does not have a Pilot bonded to him, but still has a vestigial Pilot's den: although he physically could be bonded to a Pilot (he managed to bond temporarily, yet successfully, to Stark in one instance through the Pilot's den), he does not require one in order to navigate himself and fire his weapons. He can operate purely on voice command; still, a humanoid can be implanted with a device that allows direct interface with Talyn, although not to the same extent as a Pilot (Talyn can resist orders from time to time: they're more suggestions than orders). This device, unless properly modified, can also be a two-way street through which Talyn can force feedback through to injure the implanted humanoid. It also leaves the humanoid open to feeling Talyn's pain as Pilot feels Moya's pain. The device's sympathetic effect can even go as far as to physically blind the humanoid if Talyn's sensors are damaged. Also because of the connection strength Talyn can force those connected to him to do his will to a certain degree. This causes great pain to the humanoid pilot to the extent that was seen on Crais.

== Recurring Peacekeeper characters ==
The symbol used by the Peacekeepers. Out of universe, it references El Lissitzky's 1919 poster "Beat the Whites with the Red Wedge."

Peacekeepers are of the Sebacean race and were originally a law enforcement agency, but has become a private military company which employs their people as mercenary soldiers. For a price, they will serve as the military force for planets that lack one, though this arrangement usually is more advantageous to the Peacekeepers than to their "clients". During the storyline, the Peacekeepers are known to be employed by Hynerian rebel elements loyal to Dominar Rygel XVI's cousin Bishan (although the extent of their involvement in the rebellion is unknown), and by the rulers of Delvia. The half-breed Scorpius was a notable exception to the Peacekeepers racial purity rules, and was required to endure a loyalty test to be excepted from those rules. The Peacekeepers employ several large groups as slave laborers, notably Banik.

Sebaceans are externally similar to humans, and by inference are a genetic offshoot of humans artificially created some 27 millennia before the events of the series; as a result of this genetic enhancement, Sebacean biology has several notable differences. Among the known advantages granted by their creators is a delay in the gestation of the fetus, eyesight significantly keener than that of humans, and average lifespans at least twice that of a human from the 20th century (though it is unclear if this is due to their advanced medical technology). A biological drawback is their inability to deal with extreme heat (due to their genetic loss of the gland required to regulate heat): overheating leads to a state known as the heat delirium, a brain fever that leads to a permanent coma-state referred to as the living death. Until the onset of the final stage, the condition may be halted or even reversed by sufficiently lowering the sufferer's core temperature.

=== Miklo Braca ===
Miklo Braca, played by David Franklin, was introduced in "Bone to Be Wild" at the end of season one, although he first appeared in a non-speaking role in "The Hidden Memory. At the end of fourth season, it is revealed that Braca's first name is Miklo. He made his last appearance in "The Peacekeeper Wars Part 2".

Braca's initial appearances focused on a nondescript, professional relationship to Bialar Crais, his commanding officer. As Crais continued his downward spiral into dereliction of duty in his ruthless pursuit of John Crichton, Braca slowly emerged as the voice of quiet dissent among Crais' officers and crew. While harboring serious misgivings about the pursuit, there was no way to act upon these doubts until the Command Carrier arrived at the Gammak Base where John Crichton had been captured. Braca quickly established himself as Scorpius's assistant once Crais was removed from command, which John Crichton compared to a Mr. Burns and Waylon Smithers interaction. However, their relationship is generally more complex in that Scorpius clearly trusts Braca implicitly, which is unusual for Scorpius's methodical and suspicious nature.

Throughout season two, Scorpius mentored Braca, instructing him on strategy, planning, and politics both internal to Peacekeeper command and the galaxy at large. Braca emerged from this grooming with several promotions and quickly established himself as an increasingly efficient and dangerous extension of Scorpius's loyal following.

At the beginning of season four, Lieutenant Braca was promoted to Captain Braca by Commandant Mele-On Grayza.

Initially, it appeared that he had betrayed Scorpius to Grayza, but by the end of the season it was revealed that Braca was really Scorpius's spy.

When Grayza had a mental breakdown in the end of season four due to incompetent handling of a confrontation with the Scarrans, Captain Braca relieved her of command. By invoking an article of Peacekeeper doctrine he maintained his unwavering loyalty to the organization as a whole, removing Grayza from her duties in order to save the lives of the command carrier crew from certain death. Braca later welcomed Scorpius on board, though this was seen as a welcome change compared to Gayza's command structure. When he inquired where Grayza was, Braca said he threw her in the brig, under heavy sedation.

Later, in the "Farscape: Peacekeeper Wars" miniseries Scorpius had been made commander of an armada and used Braca's command carrier as his flagship, and Braca is once again at his side. Although he is wounded during the climactic ground fighting on the planet Qujaga, he is rescued by Scorpius and is able to return with the rest of the group to safety. Braca is last seen fully recovered at the signing of the peace treaty.

Due to Scorpius's often isolated lifestyle and history, as well as the generally impersonal nature of Peacekeeper culture, his relationship with Braca is often a mixture of mentoring, paternally guiding, and intellectually stimulating at the same time. It is clear that Braca idolizes Scorpius and hopes to emulate his meteoric rise through the Peacekeeper ranks. He is also, like Scorpius, a "true believer" in the Peacekeeper cause and willing to go to any lengths to ensure their victory over the Scarrans. Braca's complete devotion to Scorpius is clearly evident when he braves the wrath of Mele-on Grayza in order to remain Scorpius's spy amongst the Peacekeepers, at great risk to his own life and position.

=== Mele-on Grayza ===
Commandant Mele-on Grayza, played by Rebecca Riggs, is a Sebacean female who has risen through the Peacekeeper ranks to achieve the status of Commandant. Politically astute and ruthlessly ambitious, she will use anyone or anything at her disposal to achieve her goals. To this end, she has had a gland implanted in her chest that secretes a substance known as Heppel oil, which she uses to bend her (male) victims to her will. A drawback to the gland is that it severely lowers her lifespan. To what degree it is lowered is not explored.

Grayza is first seen in "Into the Lion's Den Part I: Lambs to the Slaughter" towards the end of season three of the series, when she arrives aboard Scorpius' Command Carrier to put a stop to his wormhole research, considering it to be a threat to her efforts to negotiate a truce between the Sebaceans and the Scarran race.

However, she becomes intrigued by John Crichton and his wormhole knowledge, believing it to be a potential bargaining chip in her dealings with the Scarrans, and sets out to capture Moya. She is successful in tracking the crew down, and early in season 4, drugs and rapes Crichton: the stated purpose is to gain access to his wormhole knowledge, using allegedly more pleasurable methods than torture; the plan fails, though Crichton spends most of Season Four of Farscape traumatized by his treatment at Grayza's hands. Humiliated, Grayza directs Braca to keep searching for Moya - word spreads quickly to bounty-hunters of the price she puts on Crichton's head - but this also fails. Finally, when her bid for peace is lost, Grayza orders her Command Carrier to engage the Scarrans in conflict, only to be stopped by her subordinate Captain Meeklo Braca, who has secretly been allied with Scorpius while pretending to be loyal to Grayza. He assumes command of the Command Carrier.

Although reported by Braca to be under sedation in the brig at the end of the series, by the time of Farscape: The Peacekeeper Wars, Grayza is seen as an advisor to the Peacekeeper Grand Chancellor, whilst also pregnant. The child's father is not identified, leaving open the question of whether it is the Grand Chancellor's, John Crichton's, or someone else's baby. If Crichton's, Grayza's pregnancy could have been planned by her to get the wormhole knowledge from the child. The Scarran race had developed the science to remove knowledge from DNA, attempting to do just that from Crichton's unborn child with Aeryn Sun; it can be safely assumed that the Peacekeepers could do the same.

Grayza eventually kills the Grand Chancellor when he tells her of his intention to surrender to the Scarrans, and she takes command of the Peacekeeper forces herself. When Crichton finally demonstrates the destructive powers of the wormhole weapon, she agrees to a truce with the Scarrans "for the sake of our children". She is last seen aboard Moya, signing the peace treaty alongside Emperor Staleek, overseen by the Eidelon.

=== Gilina Renaez ===
Gilina Renaez (played by Alyssa-Jane Cook) is a Sebacean Peacekeeper technical specialist. Unlike the soldier caste, she sees little to no combat during her career and is instead utilized for maintenance and engineering tasks.

Gilina first encountered the crew of Moya when the Leviathan discovered the wreckage of the legendary Zelbinion (episode "PK Tech Girl"). After the crew boarded the derelict Command Carrier, they discovered Gilina already there. She explained that she was the lone surviving member of a team sent there by Captain Crais to salvage whatever they could from the vessel; the rest of her companions had been slaughtered by a previous visit of Sheyangs set on stripping the former ship. She had also heard of Aeryn Sun's defection from the Peacekeepers, and while not overly hostile, Gilina's opinion of her was not favourable (openly accusing her as a "traitor"). When the Sheyangs returned, she helped Moya's crew repair the Zelbinion's defence screen, preventing Moya from being destroyed, and agreed to install the screen on Moya. Gilina and John Crichton also felt an immediate attraction to one another. As they worked to move the defence screen to Moya, they grew continually closer until they eventually shared a kiss.

After the Sheyang attack was repelled and the screen was installed on Moya, the crew decided that the best course of action would be to leave Gilina behind to be picked up by Crais. Gilina readily agreed not to inform her superior of their visit and appropriation of Peacekeeper technology: while her opinion of Aeryn had changed to one of quiet respect despite her status, she may have also been fearful of suffering Aeryn's fate - being deemed "irreversibly contaminated" by alien life-forms and banished from the Peacekeepers - as Aeryn herself pointed out. Reluctantly, Crichton and Gilina parted ways (in Crichton's words: "Life sucks.").

Some time later, Gilina was transferred from Crais' ship to Scorpius' Gammak base (although it is never explained how since it is unlikely Crais would make a stop at any Peacekeeper facility unless absolutely necessary). When Crichton and Chiana arrived to find a tissue sample for Aeryn (episode "Nerve"), she recognised Crichton masquerading as a Peacekeeper officer and aided them getting past the base's security. Though she realized that Crichton no longer felt as strongly for her as he had before, she agreed to help them. When Crichton was apprehended by Scorpius, Gilina used her superior knowledge of the Peacekeeper systems to get off the base, before attempting to help Crichton during his interrogations in the Aurora Chair while initially remaining undiscovered. Eventually, she reprogrammed the chair to show a false memory of Crais and Crichton making a deal, resulting in a reprieve for Crichton while Crais was later interrogated (episode "The Hidden Memory"). When Aeryn arrived to rescue Crichton, Gilina helped them flee the base, but chose to stay rather than leave her life as a Peacekeeper behind. However, she would later change her mind, realising that she truly did want to leave with Crichton and that if she stayed, her part in Crichton's escape would eventually be discovered. When Crichton was caught and held at gunpoint by Scorpius during his attempted escape, Gilina unexpectedly came to his rescue, armed with a pulse rifle; her hesitation to fire on Scorpius, however, led to him shooting her instead. This distraction gave Crichton the chance to break away and escape with the rest of Moya's crew and Gilina, now mortally wounded. She had saved Crichton's life, at the cost of her own.

She spent her final moments on Moya. As she lay dying, Stark helped ease her pain, showing her a memory of a place he had kept hidden during his many sessions in the Aurora Chair. She professed her love for Crichton and he admitted that he could have loved her as well. They shared one final kiss before she died.

Almost three cycles after her death, Crichton and Chiana would encounter Gilina in another form, appearing in a neural-based, video game-like device of Stark's that was apparently based on Crichton's own memories (episode "John Quixote"). Her character was present on the Gammak base level and was later destroyed by one of the game's versions of Scorpius.

=== Selto Durka ===
Selto Durka (played by David Wheeler) was a legendary Peacekeeper captain in command of the command carrier Zelbinion. His most famed accomplishments were the liberation of Mintaka III and the quelling the Senovion rebellion. Many of his tactics are required learning during Peacekeeper training. Durka was also an inveterate sadist, and frequently tortured prisoners that came under his supervision. In Farscape, he was particularly known for torturing Rygel. He was first seen in PK Tech Girl, then in Durka Returns, and finally in Liars, Guns and Money.

During a Peacekeeper invasion of the Nebari sector, over 100 cycles (years) prior to the events covered by the TV Series, the Zelbinion was crippled by Nebari "Host" vessel. The crew refused to surrender to Nebari "mind cleansing" and were all killed, and Durka apparently committed suicide. However, it is later revealed that he had faked his own death by murdering a junior officer, and fled the Zelbinion in an escape pod. He was later captured by the Nebari and spent the next 100 cycles (years) in stasis being mind cleansed into an obedient, pacifistic servant of the Nebari Establishment.

When Durka and Salis, his Nebari master, later encountered the crew of Moya, he was recognised by Rygel who promptly tried to kill him with a makeshift bomb. However the explosion only succeeded in somehow negating the mind cleansing, and Durka was returned to his old violent self. In short order, he (allegedly) murdered his Nebari keeper and hijacked Moya, but the crew eventually succeeded in luring him into a trap. While he was powering up the weapons on the crippled Nebari ship on which he had arrived, it was jettisoned into space, leaving him stranded on board the derelict vessel.

About a cycle (year) later, Rygel discovered that Durka survived their last encounter and was then the leader of the Zenetan Pirates with which he was trying to negotiate. Durka tried to kill Rygel, but Rygel came prepared for his treachery and killed Durka instead, a surprisingly abrupt end for so prominent a villain in the series. For the next few days, Rygel carried Durka's severed head around on a stake, as a trophy of his final victory over the man who tortured him for so long.

=== Talyn Lyczac ===
Talyn Lyczac was a Peacekeeper soldier and the father of Aeryn Sun. At the beginning of the series, he has been dead for many cycles.

Talyn is rare for a Peacekeeper in that he met and fell in love with another Peacekeeper, Xhalax Sun. Together, they deliberately conceived Aeryn, as a symbol of their love. When the Peacekeepers discovered their relationship and the daughter they had sired, they gave Xhalax a choice. She could kill Talyn or she could kill Aeryn. Xhalax executes Talyn, which is her initiation into the life of an assassin for the Peacekeepers.

Aeryn would later name Moya's son Talyn in honor of her father. Almost two cycles later, Aeryn tries to contact her dead father on the planet Valldon. There, an alien being claims to be Talyn. It is soon revealed, however, that he is not Talyn, but an impostor hired by Xhalax in her attempt to kill Aeryn and cause her the same kind of pain Xhalax felt when forced to make her horrific choice between her daughter and her lover. (The false Talyn wears an insect-like prosthetic over half of his face, claiming to have thus changed his appearance through surgery when going into hiding; a similar half-face appears on the "bioloid" imposter of Aeryn after Crichton shoots her in the head.)

=== Teeg ===
Lieutenant Teeg, played by Christine Stephen-Daly, was stationed on Captain Bialar Crais' Command Carrier as early as two cycles before Moya's escape from captivity. She is his first officer and is fiercely loyal and supportive. When Crais' brother is killed, it falls to her to inform him.

Months after Moya's escape, Teeg and Crais receive orders from Peacekeeper High Command to withdraw from the Uncharted Territories. After Crais is abducted and returned by Maldis, Teeg informs him of an attempt by another officer to remove him from command, an action that she has prevented. She also notifies him that she remains the only other person besides Crais who knows about the admiral's order. Making sure it stays that way, Crais snaps her neck, ending the life of his most faithful officer.

Teeg's murder goes undiscovered until Crais is placed into the Aurora Chair by Scorpius several months later.

=== Xhalax Sun ===
Xhalax Sun (played by Linda Cropper) is the mother of Aeryn Sun, with whom she had never formed a personal relationship due to Peacekeeper rules.

Xhalax is first seen in season three of the series, as the leader of a Peacekeeper retrieval squad sent to recapture Talyn. It is revealed that Xhalax, a former spaceship pilot, had been forced to become an assassin as punishment for her crimes of having formed a romantic relationship with another Peacekeeper, having intentionally chosen to have a child with him, and then having established contact with that child (albeit briefly), all of which violated Peacekeeper rules.

When her crimes were discovered via security camera when she secretly visited Aeryn when Aeryn was a child, in order to inform her that her life was not an accident or an assigned birthing to fill the ranks, Xhalax was forced to choose between killing Aeryn and killing Aeryn's father, Talyn (for whom the aforementioned Talyn had been named). Her superiors told her that after making this choice she would be forgiven and allowed to return to being a pilot, but she was never reinstated in her former position and was instead assigned assassination missions from that time on. This line of work slowly made her become cold and bitter, seemingly destroying the love that she'd shown during her clandestine visit to young Aeryn's barracks, and the love for which she'd sacrificed the life of her lover in order to save their child.

Decades later, when she was assigned to the Peacekeeper retrieval squad, she met Aeryn once again and explained what had happened after she'd visited Aeryn. She accused Aeryn of being sentimental and weak for having named the spaceship Talyn after the father she'd never met. That encounter ended with Talyn seriously crippled and Crais having claimed to have killed Xhalax to prevent her from completing her mission to capture Talyn for the Peacekeepers. In reality, he had allowed Xhalax to leave them because he knew that otherwise, the Peacekeepers would simply send another retrieval squad.

Aeryn encountered Xhalax once again later on, and a situation arose from which only one could escape alive. During a tense standoff, Aeryn managed to reason with Xhalax only to see Xhalax shot down by Bialar Crais who through no fault of his own misinterpreted the standoff as unacceptably dangerous to Aeryn. Dying, Xhalax told Aeryn that her true selfdom had been killed years before by her unyielding loyalty to the Peacekeepers. Her last request was for Aeryn to let her fall from the high ledge where their standoff had taken place. As a token of respect, Aeryn acquiesced.

== Recurring Scarran characters ==
The Scarrans are large humanoids that are distinctly reptilian in appearance and display a noticeable variation in body types. Most members of this species are perhaps best described as tailless "lizard men" with extended necks and long muzzled faces that some have found reminiscent of a horse. A significantly smaller portion possess a slightly smaller and more humanoid face on a shorter neck. Finally there is a third and even rarer variety that are almost human in proportion though their faces retain a certain bestial mien. There have been examples of male Scarrans of all three types, but the only females seen to date have been of this last variety - a large sexual dimorphism exists between the large muscular males and the smaller svelte females. As these Scarran women possess breasts, it may be inferred that they give birth to and nurture live young; whether the same can be said of females of the other types is uncertain. Scarrans are known to reproduce in a manner physically compatible with humans and Sebaceans.

By inference natives of a hot world, Scarrans nonetheless seem comfortable in temperate conditions to the point that their military facilities are heated to a level comfortable for non-Scarrans. This may have to do with the specialized gland in their chest that permits a Scarran to emit a focused beam of heat, usually from the hand, that proves exceptionally useful for purposes of torture and interrogation. Some Scarrans are skilled enough in applying this ability and studying the response its effects elicit that they can tell whether or not the victim is answering truthfully, though certain individuals (including the Scarran/Sebacean hybrid Scorpius) seem immune, or at least resistant to this probe. The gland's ability to produce heat is negated by sub-zero temperatures, and its removal has a noticeably debilitating physical effect. The indifference to climate may, however, be due to the Scarran being cold-blooded, similar to reptiles, and that evolution resulted in a gland that 'stores' heat, which may be discharged as a defensive mechanism.

It's revealed in Season 4 that Scarrans must routinely consume a type of flower known as "Crystherium Utilia" (described as a Strelitzia by Crichton), in order to maintain their sentience. According to Harvey, failure to consume the flower results in their intelligence diminishing, and eventually turns them feral. Only a few planets possess the conditions necessary to support the flower's growth, which consequentially puts a limit on Scarran expansion. However, upon learning that the flower grows wild on Earth, the Scarrans prioritize conquering the planet, forcing Crichton to permanently close the wormhole.

Scarran society is structured along imperial lines, with an Emperor in overall charge. This position's power is not absolute - an incompetent may be removed by a body known as the "Hierarchy". Though dynastic succession is expected, killing the current Emperor and taking power is a perfectly legitimate means of ascending to the throne which has no gender restriction on who may occupy it. The position of War Minister is considered the third to the Emperorship in terms of power and prestige within Scarran society, though whether this is constitutional mandate or a result of the Imperium's inexorable mobilisation to war by the time of the Farscape series is unknown.

The Scarran Imperium rose to its current position as a major galactic power within the last 12,000 cycles and within that time they have come into conflict with the Peacekeepers, both civilisations laying claim to parts of the so-called Uncharted Territories into which their populaces might expand. How long the state of cold war has existed between them is unknown - though legend tells of the Eidelons creating a peace between the two species over 12,000 years prior to the Farscape series at the temple on Arnesk, the testimony of the Eidelons themselves as to their lack of familiarity with the Scarran species would indicate the story as the galaxy knows it is fallacious.

By the end of the Farscape series, hostilities between Scarrans and Peacekeepers escalate into an open conflict that lasts for a number of months; almost without exception, the Scarran war machine carries every battle, conquering many systems both within the Uncharted Territories, and under Peacekeeper control. Despite this, the war is brought to a peaceful conclusion with no victor when John Crichton utilises a wormhole weapon with the potential to destroy the galaxy in order to frighten both sides into signing a peace treaty.

=== Ahkna, War Minister ===
Ahkna is an upper-caste member of the Scarran race, played by Francesca Buller (the wife of co-star Ben Browder who plays series protagonist John Crichton). She is a Minister of War throughout the last few episodes of Season 4 of the series. Her position makes her the third most powerful Scarran in the Empire, under Emperor Staleek. Ahkna believes in the superiority of the Scarran race and would do almost anything to ensure that the Scarrans dominate the galaxy.

Several months before the war between the Scarrans and the Peacekeepers, Ahkna meets with Commandant Mele-On Grayza to discuss a peace treaty between the two powers. Grayza offers the Luxan territories to the Scarrans in exchange for Peacekeeper control of the Uncharted Territories and a peace treaty. Ahkna accepts the arrangement and signs the treaty, but betrays Grayza a moment later when her escorts open fire on Grayza's party, killing everyone but Grayza and Captain Braca. Ahkna takes Grayza and Braca to her ship, planning to later interrogate them about the Peacekeepers' alleged wormhole technology. Before she can do this, however, Grayza and Braca are freed by Aeryn Sun and Sikozu. Ahkna's group manages to capture Aeryn, and she turns her over to Captain Jenek.

Ahkna is later at Katratzi with Emperor Staleek when John Crichton arrives with the supposed intention of selling his wormhole knowledge to the highest bidder. Though she is suspicious of his motivations, she can do little to him since 1) it is Staleek's decision, not hers and 2) Crichton has a nuclear bomb strapped to his chest. Ahkna is relatively fearless, however, and menaces Crichton despite the nuclear bomb, almost setting it off. At the time, Scorpius is being held captive in the base and Ahkna takes much pleasure in torturing him. Despite the efforts of her underlings, Katratzi is all but destroyed by Crichton and his companions. With their precious flower destroyed, Ahkna leaves Katratzi with Staleek.

Within a number of days, Ahkna and Staleek have discovered that a large supply of crystherium flower exists on Earth. Staleek sends Ahkna's lover Pennoch in a Scarran Stryker to attack and subdue the planet. Ahkna loses her love, however, when the efforts of Crichton, Aeryn, and Pilot cause the collapse of the wormhole connected to Earth while Pennoch is still inside of it.

Two months later, Ahkna helps lead the war effort against the Peacekeepers. With superior forces and firepower, the Scarrans win every battle against the Peacekeepers. Ahkna is stationed aboard Staleek's Decimator at the Emperor's side. Ahkna is zealous in her campaign against the Peacekeepers, more so than the Emperor himself, believing that the war should only end with their enemy's total annihilation. Ahkna often acts without Staleek's consent, doing what benefits both her and the Scarran race. Pleased with her determination and ruthlessness, Staleek all but promises her rule of the Scarran Empire by his side at the completion of the war.

Ahkna's final battle takes place on the ravaged surface of Qujaga. After prolonged ground combat between Peacekeeper and Scarran forces, Crichton and his allies try to move out from their fortified position and escape to Moya. Ahkna's forces intercept them on the way and Ahkna holds Crichton at gunpoint. Before she can fire, however, Aeryn shoots her in the back, ending her life.

=== Pennoch ===
Captain Pennoch is a high ranking Scarran soldier and the lover of War Minister Ahkna. He is played by Jonathan Pasvolsky and later by John Adam. He usually appears in the service of Ahkna or Emperor Staleek and can often be seen at their side or carrying out their orders. He accompanies Ahkna to her meeting with Commandant Grayza on a dead Leviathan and commerce center. He later assists in the capture of Aeryn Sun when her pulse rifle proves to be ineffective against his thick hide. He is also present at the meeting and devastation at Katratzi. He is sent on his final mission by Emperor Staleek. In command of a Scarran Stryker, Pennoch heads for the wormhole that leads to Earth. When the Stryker arrives and enters, however, Crichton has already begun to collapse the wormhole. The Stryker is caught in the implosion, destroying the ship and killing Pennoch as Ahkna can only listen helplessly.

=== Staleek ===
Emperor Staleek is the Scarran emperor, played by Duncan Young and is a major antagonist in both the series and the mini-series. He first appears in the "We're So Screwed" three-part story in season 4, holding a conference at the secret moon of Katratzi. It was there he first encounters John Crichton. Crichton comes to Katratzi under the guise of selling the information he has on wormhole technology to the highest bidder. Crichton is truly there to rescue Scorpius, whom Staleek has prisoner at the base. During that time, Staleek hopes to find a way to capture Crichton without setting off the nuclear bomb attached to Crichton's belt. He is also under the impression that Scorpius is his spy and double agent, but in truth, Scorpius turns out to be a triple agent whose true allegiance is to the Peacekeepers. When Crichton severely damages the Katratzi base, Staleek orders Captain Pennoch to Earth, as he has learned from Crichton that the planet contains a large supply of the crystherium flower, vital to the Scarrans' power. Pennoch's mission fails and his ship is destroyed by Crichton and Aeryn Sun.

Staleek later takes an active role in the Peacekeeper-Scarran war, traveling in his flagship the Decimator. He personally captures Crichton at Arnessk and is later present at the battle over Qujaga where Crichton unleashes a wormhole weapon and forces the two sides to make peace.

Crichton mockingly calls him Emperor Sleestak, a play on his name and also a reference to Land of the Lost, a 1970s children's Saturday morning Sci-Fi TV show that featured lizard-like humanoid antagonists, presumably remembered from John Crichton's youth.

=== Captain Jenek ===
Captain Jenek is a Scarran freighter captain and a member of the Scarran ruling caste who serves as a major antagonist in the fourth season, played by Jason Clarke. Jenek serves as Aeryn's jailer while she is in Scarran custody, keeping her on board his ship and torturing her both physically and psychologically while his ship made its way to the Katratzi base. After forcing her to tell him that Crichton is the father of her child, he continues his path to Katratzi, intending to have scientists extract wormhole information from its DNA.

Jenek's ship stops at a border station that Moya's crew are also on, having disguised themselves as Scarran agents. While on the station, Noranti infects Rygel with a contagious Hynerian disease to have the station put into quarantine. Jenek becomes paranoid the disease will kill Aeryn and attempts to place her baby inside Chiana, as Nebari are immune to the disease. Moya's crew engaged in an operation to prevent this, and Scorpius lured him off ship. When Jenek caught onto his ruse, Scorpius attacked Jenek and was promptly beaten into submission by the Scarran captain and taken prisoner, though Aeryn and Chiana were rescued. Jenek arrived in Katratzi with Scorpius and attended the peace conference, serving as the chief security officer. Jenek is killed when Crichton's homemade nuclear bomb detonated, destroying the base.

== Other recurring characters ==
=== Bekhesh ===
Bekhesh is the leader of a group of Tavlek mercenaries but later gives up his life of violence. He is played by John Adam. He wears a gauntlet weapon that injects him with a narcotic stimulant, giving him increased speed, strength, and aggression, but also resulting in addiction. The gauntlet can also fire short energy bursts with an output that is on par with a pulse pistol blast, able to kill a target in one hit, and can absorb blasts too. He is featured in the episode "Throne for a Loss" and the trilogy "Liars, Guns, and Money".

He is first encountered by the crew of Moya shortly after John Crichton's arrival in the Uncharted Territories. Posing as a group of traders, Bekhesh's group attempts to rob Moya shortly after boarding. While deterred from stealing any goods, Bekhesh manages to kidnap Rygel, because they have been led to believe by the Hynerian that he is a valuable prisoner, the current dominar of a great empire. Bekhesh takes Rygel to the planet below and imprisons him in a makeshift cell, burying the Hynerian halfway into the ground as he waits for the crew of Moya to pay Rygel's ransom. Despite Rygel's supposed value, Bekhesh treats him mercilessly and does not tolerate dissent. When Rygel tries to escape, Bekhesh strangles him, nearly causing the Hynerian's death. Rygel's crewmates eventually come for him and as Bekhesh and Crichton have a Mexican standoff, Crichton is able to convince Bekhesh that Rygel is not worth anything. Bekhesh gives him up, deciding that Rygel has already been more trouble than he could ever be worth.

Almost two cycles later, Crichton seeks Bekhesh out, hoping to acquire the gauntlet to use it in an assault to rescue D'Argo's son. He discovers that Bekhesh had given up his life of violence and has joined a pacifist holy order. He is, however, unwilling to give up the gauntlet and agrees to go with Crichton. After Crichton later turns himself over to Scorpius in exchange for Jothee, Bekhesh helps stage an assault on a Shadow Depository, fighting beside D'Argo and Aeryn in an effort to rescue Crichton. After their success, Bekhesh takes his cut and thanks the crew of Moya for bringing him back to his life of violence.

Unlike other Tavleks, Bekhesh wears some type of masking shield over the top of his head. Its purpose is unknown but it is implied that it is due to injury.

=== D.K. (Douglas Knox) ===
John Crichton's childhood friend who, along with Crichton, formulated the theory that was being tested by the Farscape project. Crichton helped D.K. cheat on his SATs, and helped get him his job at IASA. In the episode "Terra Firma" D.K. and his wife were killed by an alien named Skreeth. D.K. appears in the episodes "Premiere", "Won't Get Fooled Again", "Unrealized Reality" and "Terra Firma".

=== Einstein ===
First introduced in Season 4, "Einstein" is an Ancient who has tremendous knowledge of wormholes, time and theoretical physics. His appearance is a plot device which provides John Crichton with an opportunity to finally harness wormhole travel and return to Earth, a main focus of the series. He is shown as enigmatic and ultimately fake, appearing as an eyeless, gray-skinned human being wearing a suit and tie, obviously in imitation of Crichton's memories, as he is not truly existent in Crichton's world, simply a manifestation of another, vastly more powerful being. He is one of the many 'godlike aliens' which episodes of Farscape often center around, presenting alternate realities and confusing illusions, similar to Maldis and the Ancients. Einstein actually reveals to Crichton that the Ancients are members of his race, though substantially modified, who provide intelligence of 'normal' space. There are allusions and references made to the Pathfinder wormhole-traversing race as well as the extradimensional entity from the Season One episode Through the Looking Glass. The moniker "Einstein" is given to him by Crichton. His true name, and whether he has one, is not known.

In Farscape: The Peacekeeper Wars, after considerable badgering by Crichton, Einstein removes the mental blocks preventing Crichton from turning a wormhole into a weapon. After Crichton builds such a weapon and uses it to coerce the Peacekeepers and Scarrans to negotiate peace, Einstein strips the knowledge from his mind even as he's shutting off the weapon.

He is played by John Bach.

=== Furlow ===
Furlow (played by Magda Szubanski) is a knowledgeable, yet somewhat arrogant, mechanic on the desert world Dam-Ba-Da. While her race is not known, she appears to be a rather short and stocky female, likely Sebacean.

The crew of Moya first met Furlow when John Crichton and Aeryn Sun were forced to land John's IASA Farscape One module there after it had suffered damage in space. Furlow offered to repair John's ship, provided he could pay for it. When repairs were completed, and compensation was demanded, Crichton admitted that he had nothing with which to pay her. Furlow demanded all the flight data he had recorded on wormholes so far to Crichton's dismay.

Two cycles later, one of the twinned Crichtons returned to Dam-Ba-Da aboard Talyn. An Ancient in the guise of Jack Crichton had accused him of selling the wormhole knowledge given to him by the ancients. However, Crichton had given the knowledge to Furlow before ever meeting the Ancients. Furlow used the wormhole information given to her by John, as well as a replica of the Farscape One module, to conduct her own wormhole research. Her plan was to sell it to the highest bidder—in this case the Scarrans, via the Charrids. When John and Ancient Jack arrived on Dam-Ba-Da, the Charrids had already taken over Furlow's garage in order to secure the knowledge for the Scarrans, who were on their way to the planet. Before John, Aeryn, and Jack were able to destroy the information, the Scarrans downloaded some of it, so "Jack" came up with a plan to destroy the Scarran ship, deciding to build a device that used wormholes as a weapon. Before the Scarrans arrived, however, Furlow betrayed them, killing Jack. She stole the completed device—a displacement engine—and fled her shop in a vehicle, hoping to sell the engine to the Scarrans when they arrived. Crichton pursued and caused Furlow to crash, inadvertently exposing the radioactive material that powered the engine. Knowing that approaching the engine would mean risking a fatal dose of radiation, Furlow fled, and urged Crichton to do the same. But Crichton instead retrieved the engine, sacrificing his life in order to ensure that the Scarrans would not retain the information they'd just stolen.

Furlow's whereabouts thereafter remain unknown as she never again appears in the series.

=== Jack Crichton ===
John Robert "Jack" Crichton Sr. is a retired astronaut who at one point had walked on the Moon, and the father of John Crichton; Jack is played by Kent McCord.

During his time in the Uncharted Territories, the junior Crichton would often think of his father. In his first year, he would sometimes record his thoughts into a tape recorder, usually addressing Jack in his recordings.

A member of the Ancients took on his form when conversing with John Crichton. Initially this was to fool John while studying human reactions (for a possible colonisation of Earth). Following John seeing his true form, the illusion was retained for unknown reasons (Possibly to make John feel more at ease with him).

Around a cycle later, John would again encounter a false image of his father. This was the result of a Scarran interrogation device which presented Crichton with increasingly erratic and irrational imagery in order to break his mind.

A cycle after this incident, John again encounters the Ancient in the form of his father. Assumedly, this Ancient took the form of Jack to make Crichton more comfortable as they worked together to keep wormhole technology out of the hands of the Scarrans. "Ancient Jack" was eventually killed by Furlow who had hoped to sell the wormhole tech to the Scarrans.

Crichton would finally see his real father again, about a cycle later, though this time he encountered Jack when he was younger in 1985. Crichton soon discovered that his presence in the past had altered history and that Jack was now to command the tragic final flight of the Space Shuttle Challenger. Crichton and his friends did what they could to fix the timeline, while John avoided any unnecessary contact with his parents. It seems, however, that Jack later caught a glimpse of his grown son shortly after he had rescued the younger 1985-John from a burning house.

When John and the rest of Moya's crew returned to the present, they discovered that they were still in Earth orbit, now in late 2003. John and Jack reunited on Moya, though John was hesitant at first, wary of yet another Ancient-created, or similar, illusion. John accepted that he had finally returned home and he along with the crew of Moya spent some time on Earth. During their stay, John was distressed to learn that Jack now had, while nationalistic, an isolationist attitude toward the other nations of the world, due primarily to the September 11 terrorist attacks. In spite of their differences, John eventually convinced his father to support a unified globe, knowing it was their only chance Earth had if they hoped to face the challenges of the galaxy that Crichton had already faced.

Months later, Crichton would contact Jack one last time. With the Scarrans on their way to attack Earth, John decided to collapse the wormhole linking Earth to the area of the galaxy near the Uncharted Territories and Tormented Space. After landing a transport pod on the Moon, John used one of its communicators to dial Jack's house. They wished each other good bye and Jack expressed his pride in John and all he had done before they closed the line.

=== Jothee ===
Jothee is the half-Luxan/half-Sebacean son of Ka D'Argo and his late wife Lo'Laan, played by Matthew Newton, and later by Nathaniel Dean. After the death of Lo'Laan, D'Argo left Jothee in the care of others. In the time between D'Argo giving him up and his reappearance, the details are vague. It was implied that Jothee spent time as a slave, as he was found among Banik slaves.

As a result of his separation, Jothee was denied most of the Luxan upbringing and, after being the subject of abuse over his mixed heritage, mutilated his more Luxan features.

While on Moya Jothee had an affair with Chiana, who was his father's lover, which caused a rift between both D'Argo and Chiana, and D'Argo and Jothee. Jothee left Moya's crew at this point.

His whereabouts between his departure from Moya and PK Wars are unknown. Two cycles later, Jothee re-appeared as the "Kleeva" (a military strategist and officer) of a small Luxan commando unit during PK Wars. According to comic continuity later, Jothee's unique background helped him achieve the honor of becoming the youngest Kleeva in the history of the Luxan people. Jothee's skills are primarily tactic and mind based, unlike his father who quite often relied upon his brute strength, anger, and intimidating stature to get results.

=== Maldis ===
Maldis (played by Chris Haywood) was a recurring villain within the series. By his very nature, Maldis enjoys the pain and death of others, feeding off them like a psychic vampire. Though his exact origin and nature is unknown, Maldis is a powerful, non-corporeal being, having seemingly met his mortal end on several occasions, but always returning. He is sometimes likened to as the "Q" of Farscape, also far more sinister. He appeared in the episodes "That Old Black Magic" and "Picture if You Will". Maldis wields immense powers which enable him to shapeshift, allowing him to take on any form he wishes, thus obscuring his true age or species. Maldis has reconstituted his physical form on more than one occasion, and occupied spaces beyond the normal dimensions of spacetime, hinting that he may be more than a mere sentient being.

The crew first encounters Maldis while visiting a commerce planet early in their adventures. Taking the form of a clown named Igg, he demonstrates that he knows a lot about Crichton, and explains that he serves a benevolent old magician named Haloth (also Maldis). Haloth tells Crichton he has the ability to set up a meeting between himself and Bialar Crais, at which Crichton can explain to Crais the circumstances of his brother's death, which will end the Peacekeeper captain's pursuit. Then Maldis, as Haloth, also approaches Crais, offering him John Crichton for a price. When Crais agrees, Haloth reveals himself to Crichton, and unleashes Crais upon him within an arena of his own devising.

As the two fight, Zhaan gains help from a local high priest, Liko. Together, they work to unleash Zhaan's abilities to inflict pain and damage on others. Interrupting Maldis' attempt to kill Crichton and feed off his soul, Zhaan renders the dark sorcerer tangible, allowing Crichton to smash his physical form to bits.

Many months later, Chiana obtains a unique picture from a woman named Kyvan. She begins experiencing progressively more dangerous "accidents" seemingly predicted by images in the picture. After attempts to examine it end in Chiana's disappearance, the crew try destroying the picture to bring her back. The picture reassembles again and again, eventually causing D'Argo to disappear as well. The remaining crew eventually learn from Kyvan that the image was commissioned by Maldis. Zhaan enacts a plan to defeat the wizard again. Zhaan thrusts Crichton into the portrait, where he distracts Maldis while Zhaan instructs Aeryn to kill Kyvan (actually an extension of Maldis) so that he is weakened enough to be physically dispersed again.

With more of his links to the physical world destroyed, Maldis is once again banished to an unknown region to conserve his energies until he gains enough strength for his inevitable return (although he does not manifest again in the series).

=== Grunchlk ===
Grunchlk is an unkempt and opportunistic swindler who runs a medical facility, played by Hugh Keays-Byrne. Grunchlk serves as the go-between for Diagnosans (to whom translator microbes are fatal) and patients, though he often overcharges the patients, occasionally against the Diagnosan's wishes. Grunchlk also keeps dying patients cryogenically frozen so that Diagnosans can use their parts in medical procedures, trapping them between life and death. On some occasions he freezes their family members as well, as seen with Jool and her cousins.

Grunchlk is first seen in "Die Me, Dichtomy", where Moya is brought to his facility to treat burn wounds she had sustained during the "Liar, Guns, and Money" three-parter. Grunchlk also agrees to have the Diagnosan remove the neural chip from John's brain. Scorpius, signaled by Harvey after the neural clone briefly took control of Crichton's body, formed a deal with Grunchlk that would have him give Scorpius the neural chip in exchange for payment. When Scorpius arrives alongside a squad of Peacekeeper commandos, Grunchlk sets a cryogenic pod containing a Scarran agent to thaw as insurance against Scorpius, planning to stop the pod from thawing should Scorpius live up to his end of the bargain.

After a Diagnosan opens the pod prematurely and is murdered by the Scarran, Scorpius places an implant in Grunchlk's brain that allowed him to take control of Grunchlk's body. The Scorpius-controlled Grunchlk encountered the Scarran, and the Scarran placed Grunchlk inside a cryogenic pod and froze him. Stark, who was horrified by Grunchlk's use of the cryogenic pods, reported him as dead to the rest of the crew and left him frozen.

In The Peacekeeper Wars, Grunchlk returns, having somehow escaped the pod, and now with another Diagnosan, who had given Chiana new eyes. Grunchlk and the Diagnosan accompany Chiana to Qujaga to treat Aeryn and Crichton.

=== Jack the Ancient ===
"Jack" is an Ancient who takes the form of Crichton's father Jack and serves as something of a mentor to John, played by Kent McCord. Jack is not actually his name, but rather a nickname Crichton gives him, as Jack's true name is pronounced through a series of incomprehensible sounds.

Jack first appears when he places John, Aeryn, Rygel, and D'Argo inside a simulation of Earth, so that he can determine if it would be a suitable home for the Ancients. Jack takes the form of Jack Crichton, as it was deemed suitable to get John to trust him. Crichton eventually uncovers the ruse, and Jack reveals the purpose of the experiment to him. Though Crichton is understandably angry over the manipulation, the two part on civil terms.

While Crichton is being tortured by Scorpius in the Aurora Chair, Scorpius uncovers a repressed memory of Jack. It is revealed that Jack, as an apology, implanted wormhole knowledge in Crichton's brain so he would be able to return to Earth faster, and erased the memory because the Ancients believe that if one does not discover the knowledge by themselves, they do not deserve it. This proves crucial to the rest of the series, establishing the central arc of the Peacekeepers and later the Scarrans pursuing John for his wormhole knowledge.

After discovering a Charrid using a replica of Crichton's module to fly through a wormhole, Jack is sent by the other Ancients to track Crichton down and see if he had given away wormhole knowledge. After Crichton makes it clear he did not, the two deduce that Furlow was the one using the wormhole knowledge. The two tracked her to Dam-Ba-Da, and found the Charrids and Scarrans has turned on her. With a Scarran dreadnought on the way, Jack and Crichton planned to destroy the ship and Furlow's equipment along with the ship itself, by building a wormhole weapon. Jack intends to activate the weapon himself, not wanting to endanger Crichton's life, but Furlow shoots and fatally wound him. Crichton comforts Jack in his final moments, and after he dies, Jack reverts to his true form.
