= David Kemper (writer) =

American television writer and producer

David Kemper is an American television writer and producer who is best known for his work on the science fiction show Farscape. He was raised in Oak Park, Michigan, where he attended Ferndale High School. At school he was a baseball player. He graduated from the University of Michigan before moving to California.

In addition to Farscape, Kemper wrote episodes of Star Trek: The Next Generation, SeaQuest DSV, The Pretender, Swamp Thing, and Stargate SG-1, and was also the executive producer for the SyFy channel film Aztec Rex.

In October 2006 made a deal with the Sci Fi Channel to supply five movies to their Saturday night movie franchise.

== Filmography ==
=== Television ===
The numbers in writing credits refer to the number of episodes.

Title	Year	Credited as		Network	Notes
Title	Year	Writer	Executive producer	Network	Notes
Star Trek: The Next Generation	1989	Yes (2)	No	First-run syndication	
Tour of Duty	1989–90	Yes (5)	No	CBS	Executive story editor (3 episodes)
Booker	1990	Yes (1)	No	Fox	
Street Justice	1992–93	Yes (2)	No	Syndication	
Silk Stalkings	1992–93	Yes (3)	No	CBS	
Swamp Thing	1993	Yes (1)	No	USA Network	
SeaQuest DSV	1993–94	Yes (5)	No	NBC	Co-producer (season 1: 10 episodes); Producer (season 1: 13 episodes)
Star Trek: Voyager	1995	Yes (1)	No	UPN	
M.A.N.T.I.S.	1995	Yes (2)	No	Fox	
The Outer Limits	1995	Yes (1)	No	Showtime	
The Pretender	1997	Yes (1)	No	NBC	
The Burning Zone	1997	Yes (1)	No	UPN	
Pacific Blue	1997–98	Yes (8)	No	USA Network	
Ghost Stories	1997	Yes (1)	No	The Family Channel	Anthology series
Stargate SG-1	1998	Yes (1)	No	Showtime	
Farscape	1999–2003	Yes (16)	Yes	Nine Network; Sci-Fi Channel	Co-executive producer (season 1: 6 episodes); Executive producer (69 episodes)
Farscape: The Peacekeeper Wars	2004	Yes	Yes	Sci-Fi Channel	Miniseries
Aztec Rex	2008	No	Yes	Sci Fi	Television film
Heatstroke	2008	Yes	Yes	Sci Fi	Television film
Cult	2013	Yes (1)	No	The CW	Consulting producer (12 episodes)
