= List of Water Rats episodes =

The following is a list of episodes for the Australian television programme, Water Rats on Nine Network.

== Series overview ==
Series	Episodes	Originally released	
Series	Episodes	First released	Last released
1	26	12 February 1996	19 August 1996
2	26	10 February 1997	4 August 1997
3	31	9 February 1998	1 September 1998
4	32	16 February 1999	12 October 1999
5	36	22 February 2000	14 November 2000
6	26	6 February 2001	7 August 2001

== Episodes ==
=== Season 1 (1996) ===
No. overall	No. in series	Title	Directed by	Written by	Original release date
1	1	"Dead in the Water (1)"	Tim Burstall	Tony Morphett	12 February 1996
The Water Police investigate a fatal bombing on a charter ferry. The divers try to locate other explosive devices that may still be in the harbour. Kevin Holloway, Frank's younger brother, joins Homicide and is partnered with Frank's good friend Knocker Harrison. Co Starring: Jeremy Callaghan (Kevin Holloway), Peter Mochrie (John 'Knocker' Harrison), Andrew Gilbert (Jimmy Holloway). Guest Stars: Peter Hehir (Bowen), Alan David Lee (Jim Fleming), Bryan Marshall (Inspector Farrell), Steven Grives (Jonathon Goldstein), Lex Marinos (Bellamy), Patsy Stephen (Daphne Bridgeman), John Samaha (Radio Operator), Kelly Butler (Greta Ritchie), Pamela Drysdale (Patty Holloway), Jacqueline Linke (Negligee Bandit), Vanessa Williams (Ms Chapman), Ken Goodlet (Mr Fredericks), Pat Hutchinson (Mrs Fredericks), Jeremy Chance (Powell), Damian Foley (Danny Forrest), Anja Coleby (Woman Jogger), Gary Deacon (Charter Skipper), Kristen Duff (Carly Hansen), Katy Edwards (2nd Student), Don Atkinson (Snr. Cons. Russell), Jinny McCallister (Mrs Hansen), Peter Heath (Mr Hansen), Andrew Lewis (Ferry Skipper), Treffyn Koreshoff (David Goldstein)
2	2	"Dead in the Water (2)"	Tim Burstall	Tony Morphett	12 February 1996
A man claiming to have the missing bomb takes hostages on a passenger ferry. Frank and Rachel stake out a yacht to catch a negligee-wearing burglar. Co Starring: Jeremy Callaghan (Kevin Holloway), Peter Mochrie (John 'Knocker' Harrison), Andrew Gilbert (Jimmy Holloway). Guest Stars: William Zappa (Conran), Peter Hehir (Bowen), Alan David Lee (Jim Fleming), Bryan Marshall (Inspector Farrell), Steven Grives (Jonathan Goldstein), Lex Marinos (Bellamy), Patsy Stephen (Daphne Bridgeman), John Samaha (Radio Operator), Kelly Butler (Greta Ritchie), Pamela Drysdale (Patty Holloway), Jacqueline Linke (Negligee Bandit), Vanessa Williams (Ms Chapman), Ken Goodlet (Mr Fredericks), Pat Hutchinson (Mrs Fredericks), Jeremy Chance (Powell), Damian Foley (Danny Forrest), Anja Coleby (Woman Jogger), Gary Deacon (Charter Skipper), Kristen Duff (Carly Hansen), Katy Edwards (2nd Student), Don Atkinson (Snr. Cons. Russell), Jinny McCallister (Mrs Hansen), Peter Heath (Mr Hansen), Andrew Lewis (Ferry Skipper), Treffyn Koreshoff (David Goldstein) Note: Aired back to back with episode 1.
3	3	"Ghost Ship"	Mark Piper	Anne Brooksbank	19 February 1996
The Nemesis crew discover an abandoned yacht adrift in the waters off the coast of Sydney. All they find on board the boat is a dog and the ashes of a body. The ashes brings in investigators whose involvement impedes Frank and Rachel's own investigation of the incident. Co Starring: none Guest Stars: David Downer (Stephen Vickery), Liz Chance (Julie Haynes), Bianca Sulkowicz (Nikki), Bryan Marshall (Inspector Farrell), Pamela Drysdale (Patty Holloway), John Samaha (Radio Operator), Morna Seres (Angie), David Terry (Warren Martin), Arthur Brigg (The Groper), Gary Simmons (Constable No. 1), John Walton (Constable No. 2), Douglas McDonald (Man in water), Dave McLean (Bus Driver), Liza Tyler (Waitress), Stuart Armstrong (Quarantine Officer), Brig Taylor (Nikki's Grandmother), Julie Fuad (Joanne Welsh)
4	4	"Iron Man"	Mark Piper	Peter Gawler	26 February 1996
Knocker and Kevin from Homicide are called in to assist the detectives in their investigation of the death of an Iron Man competitor, whose shark-ravaged body was found washed up on a beach. Co Starring: Jeremy Callaghan (Kevin Holloway), Peter Mochrie (John 'Knocker' Harrison), Andrew Gilbert (Jimmy Holloway), Bruce Barry (Reg Costello), Liz Chance (Julie Haynes), Steven Grives (Jonathon Goldstein), Jamie Roden (Jack Godfrey), Helen Scott (Joy Godfrey), John Samaha (Radio Operator), Treffyn Koreshoff (David Goldstein) Jo Phillips (Shannon Douglas), Russell Newman (SLSC Secretary), Marc Gray (Todd Morris), Matthew Jackson (Clinton James), Stephen Anderton (Constable Robert Spring), Christopher Tomkinson (Detective Constable Brad Piper), Jan Ringrose (Mrs Carson), Rod Taylor (Coach), Ryan Kwanten (Nipper), Martin Raphael (Morgue Attendant), John Boxer (Bouncer)
5	5	"Catch and Kill"	Mark Piper	Denise Morgan	18 March 1996
Frank and Rachel investigate the murder of a dock worker and the theft of a shipment of scotch. The Water Police become embroiled in a feud between Tommy's father and a rival fishing family after the Nemesis is forced to cut the nets of a fishing boat stuck in a shipping lane. Co Starring: Jeremy Callaghan (Kevin Holloway), Andrew Gilbert (Jimmy Holloway). Guest Stars: Gary Waddell (Billy Pope), Harold Hopkins (Union Representative), Lani Tupu Snr. (Fereti Tavita), Sal Sharah (Mr Rispoli), Christie McNicol (Connie Wellings), Allan Cinis (Brookes), John Samaha (Radio Operator), Vic Murray (Bludger Riley), Tom Appleton (Steve Holt), Annie Davies McCubbin (Emma Healy), Joseph Clements (Grieves), Tony Poli (Carlo Rispoli), Alex Morcos (Mario Rispoli), Terry Porter (Priest), June Townsend (Mabel), Reilly Baker (Joe Holloway), Eleni Batley (Sarah Holloway)
6	6	"Lie Down with Dogs"	Mark Piper	Anne Brooksbank	25 March 1996
When Billy Pope's girlfriend is found murdered on the eve of giving evidence at an inquiry into police corruption, Internal Affairs comes after Frank believing he tipped off the killer as to her whereabouts. Co Starring: Jeremy Callaghan (Kevin Holloway), Peter Mochrie (John 'Knocker' Harrison). Guest Stars: Gary Waddell (Billy Pope), Richard Healy (Insp. Tony Brady), Lani Tupu Snr. (Fereti Tavita), Jack Mayers (Constable Pearson), Michael Burgess (Sergeant Carpella), Sal Sharah (Mr Rispoli), Jamie Jackson (Glen Forbes), John Samaha (Radio Operator), Gypsy Dorney (Constable Annie Schmidt), May Howlett (Old Woman), Christopher Baz (Damien), Tony Poli (Carlo Rispoli), Alex Morcos (Mario Rispoli), Ronald Rodger (Senior Constable O'Brien), Matthew John (Constable #1)
7	7	"V.I.P"	Chris Martin-Jones	Tony Morphett	1 April 1996
When a Vietnamese family are the victims of a home invasion in which their son is kidnapped, the detectives are called upon to locate the kidnappers before their ransom deadline expires. In the meantime, two American Secret Service agents arrive to oversee the Water Police's security preparations for a forthcoming presidential visit. Co Starring: none Guest Stars: Josephine Byrnes (Agent Carter), Terry Serio (Lieutenant Con Vellis), Grace Parr (Mrs Diem), Yang Li (Mr Diem), Kevin Copeland (Agent Sean Doherty), Joshua Rosenthal (Gary White), Enrico Babic (Radio Operator), Daniel Taylor (Pete), Bree Desborough (Sally), Glenn Hoare (Denny), Lisa van der Veer (Nurse), Avril Wynne (Female Police Officer), Andrew Fennessey (Francis Diem), Leo Roland (Jonnie Nguyen).
8	8	"The Shaft"	Chris Martin-Jones	Tony Morphett	8 April 1996
The divers are called back to the site of a diving accident to rescue a man intent on recovering the body of his wife. Frank and Rachel's investigation of a number of stolen military weapons reveals that the crime is an inside job. Co Starring: Jeremy Callaghan (Kevin Holloway), Andrew Gilbert (Jimmy Holloway). Guest Stars: Peter Carroll (Joseph Craig), Terry Serio (Lieutenant Con Vellis), Jamie Jackson (Glenn Forbes), Enrico Babic (Radio Operator), Dominic Bianco (Rollie Campbell), Gypsy Dorney (Senior Constable Annie Schmidt), Hélène Joy (Lucy White), Richard Healy (Detective Inspector Brady), Robbie McGregor (Steve Murphy), Brian Marshall (Inspector Michael Farrell), Jack Mayers (Constable Pearson), Ronald Rodger (Senior Constable O'Brien), Joshua Rosenthal (Gary White), Martin Slatter (Docs Officer), Jonathon Speer (Recreational Diver), Daniel Taylor (Pete)
9	9	"Death in the Family"	Richard Sarell	Denise Morgan	15 April 1996
A seemingly routine drug raid on a cruise ship turns up a bracelet that brings Detectives Goldstein and Holloway into the investigation of the disappearance of a young Turkish schoolgirl. Co Starring: Jeremy Callaghan (Kevin Holloway), Peter Mochrie (John 'Knocker' Harrison). Guest Stars: Giordano Gangl (Mamat Dursan), Barbara Gouskos (Fatma Dursan), Robbie McGregor (Steve Murphy), Alexander Petersons (Craddock), Rebecca Leane (Tien Tray), David Lewis (Harold Morley), Enrico Babic (Radio Operator), Kate Champion (Laura Murphy), Lawrence Carmichael (Rick Spencer), Sky Tse (Captain Huang), Marilyn Mayo (Mrs Browning), Sandra Best (Mrs Morley), George Alexander (Portly Man), Sitori Statham (Hirsute Man), Elizabeth Baker (Old Lady), Rowan Cudmore (Windsurfer)
10	10	"Goldstein and Son"	Richard Sarell	Denise Morgan	22 April 1996
A young woman whose boyfriend Rachel shot dead during a robbery attempt a few years earlier, gets out of jail and begins stalking her. Co Starring: Jeremy Callaghan (Kevin Holloway), Peter Mochrie (John 'Knocker' Harrison). Guest Stars: Pippa Grandison (Fran Marsden), Treffyn Koreshoff (David Goldstein), Steven Grives (Jonathon Goldstein), Kenny Graham (Sherman), Betty Lucas (Sybil Grantham), Kathryn Dunn (Debbie Goldstein), Enrico Babic (Radio Operator), Alan Flower (Briggs), Tyson Salijevic (Bill), Geoff Bartlett (Bluey), David Pfitzner (Print Expert), Natalie Page (Customer), Liz Winters (Attendant), Robert Lancaster (Surveillance 1)
11	11	"Kilo Hotel"	Mark Piper	Anne Brooksbank	29 April 1996
The dive team is called upon to search for Kevin Holloway's body when his car is found abandoned at The Gap – a notorious spot for suicides. While awaiting word about Kevin, Frank and Rachel investigate the death of an animal smuggler whose body was pulled from the harbour with unusual wounds. Co Starring: Jeremy Callaghan (Kevin Holloway), Peter Mochrie (John 'Knocker' Harrison), Andrew Gilbert (Jimmy Holloway). Guest Stars: Kim Knuckey (Sgt. John Thomppson), Rudi Baker (Jeremy), Peter Rowley (Pathologist), Enrico Babic (Radio Operator), Leon Ford (First Probationer), Jennifer Hardy (Second Probationer), John Andrews (Jeremy's Father), Gail Watson (Zoo Keeper), Shena Sanders (Constable No. 2), Felix Biviano (Constable No. 1), Roger Chauncy (Holloway's Father), John Massey (Carter), Henry Ngui (Tony Wong)
12	12	"The Jigsaw Man"	Mark Piper	Anne Brooksbank	6 May 1996
Inspector Tony Brady of Internal Affairs and Homicide's John Harrison head up the task force named Kilo Hotel, which has been formed to investigate Kevin's death, now believed to be murder. Body parts found floating in the harbour lead Frank and Rachel back to the victim's boyfriend. Co Starring: Jeremy Callaghan (Kevin Holloway), Peter Mochrie (John 'Knocker' Harrison), Andrew Gilbert (Jimmy Holloway). Guest Stars: John Negroponte (Jim Pappas), Steve Rodgers (Peter), Richard Healy (Detective Inspector Brady), Craig Ashley (Pappas' Solicitor), Les Foxcroft (Old Man), Amanda Mires (Crime Scene Officer), Enrico Babic (Radio Operator), Treffyn Koreshoff (David Goldstein), Tyson McConkey (Boy on Yacht), Leah Tansey (Girl on Yacht), Lindsay McCormack (Tattoo Artist)
13	13	"Bang Bang, You're Dead"	Chris Martin-Jones	Peter Gawler	13 May 1996
A drug raid on the boat of Jim Pappas, the chief suspect in Kevin's death, ends with Pappas being shot and killed by Knocker. Rachel loses access to her son David, when she is late for a custody hearing. Co Starring: Peter Mochrie (John 'Knocker' Harrison), Andrew Gilbert (Jimmy Holloway). Guest Stars: Douglas Hedge (Norman 'Skip' Towne), John Negroponte (Jim Pappas), Brandon Burke (Captain Rashid Kassem), Richard Healy (Detective Inspector Brady), Wadih Dona (Rev. Alex Kaldas), Steven Grives (Jonathon Goldstein), Hani Malik (Mustafa Muhammed), Enrico Babic (Radio Operator), Simon Mills (Ken McDowell), Meg Clancy (Court Officer), Susie Steadman (Mrs Pappas), Robert Simper (Nick Polites)
14	14	"Black Water"	Chris Martin-Jones	Peter Gawler	20 May 1996
The body of a young boy is found in the boot of a car pulled from the harbour. The boy's murder bears a striking similarity to another boy's death thirteen months earlier. This leads the detectives on a search for the killer in hopes of finally bringing him to justice. Co Starring: Peter Mochrie (John 'Knocker' Harrison). Guest Stars: David Webb (Detective Mick Poole), Mary Regan (Detective Caroline Cox), Christopher Morsley (Ross Beale), David Franklin (Detective Chris Theodorou), Celia Ireland (Sarah Fleetwood), Ian Bliss (Colin Fleetwood), Enrico Babic (Radio Operator), Treffyn Koreshoff (David Goldstein), Nellie McQuinn (Tegan Fleetwood), Sally Cahill (Janice Brock), Anthony Ingersent (Mr Kenna), Jan Langford Penny (Mrs Kenna), Kristen Boys (Tanya Robertson), Roslyn Oades (Bonnie Jamieson), Jill Robertson (Teacher), Marc Power (Identikit Expert), Sean McKenzie (Pathologist), Marc Turner (Teenager), Dennis Tordoff (Witness No.1), John Mason (Witness No.2), Leanne Mueller (Young Woman), Ji Ming (Eel Man)
15	15	"Eyewitness"	Scott Hartford-Davis	Susan Hore	27 May 1996
When a man is killed by a speedboat deliberately driven into the back of his vessel, the detectives are unsuccessful in getting witnesses to come forward to testify when the person responsible is identified as one of Sydney's most notorious crime figures. Co Starring: Peter Mochrie (John 'Knocker' Harrison). Guest Stars: Peter Kowitz (Marty Miller), Pat Bishop (Miranda Latham), Phillip Holder (Paul Robson), Helen Dallimore (Katie Wood), Patrick Thompson (Andy), Joel Edgerton (Pete Crosby), Skye Wansey (Penny Reeves), Geoff Cartwright (Chris Walsh), Enrico Babic (Radio Operator), Ella Mei Wong (Mrs Nguyen), Kenneth Moraleda (Tony Nguyen), Casey Hwang (Thong Nguyen), Fatt Bob (Vincent Ravli)
16	16	"Pay-Back"	Scott Hartford-Davis	Michael Winter	3 June 1996
Internal Affairs sets their sights on Helen, believing that she sold confidential information that led to the murder of police witness Miranda Latham. Co Starring: Peter Mochrie (John 'Knocker' Harrison). Guest Stars: Peter Kowitz (Marty Miller), Helen Thomson (Anne Harvey), Phillip Holder (Paul Robson), Steven Grives (Jonathon Goldstein), Richard Healy (Inspector Brady), Marina Finlay (Gretchen Hart), Enrico Babic (Radio Operator), Ronald Rodger (Senior Constable O'Brien), Andrew Oughton (Jet Ski Rider), Mark Goodwin (Jet Ski Double), Colin Borgonon (Robert Jennings), Ella Mei Wong (Mrs Nguyen), Kenneth Moraleda (Tony Nguyen), Barry McMahon (Dero), John Tutt (Grant Davis), Mark Symington (Senior Sergeant), Michael Walker (Constable)
17	17	"Old Flame"	Mark Piper	Anthony Ellis	10 June 1996
While attempting to apprehend two fleeing armed robbers, Frank is shot and is rushed to hospital. Inspector Webb receives information on the robbery suspects from Moira Randall, an old friend with a suspicious connection to the thieves. Co Starring: Peter Mochrie (John 'Knocker' Harrison). Guest Stars: Marshall Napier (Joe Da Silva), Linden Wilkinson (Moira Randall), Matt Day (Matthews), Mary Regan (Caroline Cox), Julian Leahter (Jarvis), Steven Grives (Jonathon Goldstein), Treffyn Koreshoff (David Goldstein), Enrico Babic (Radio Operator), Glenn Ruehland (Peter Randall), Sean Dibben (Sean Lawrence), Nash Edgerton (Greg Solly), Kristen Mann (Ron Mason), Lyn Dalby (Grace Mason), Emma Haberman (Dr Heller), Annette McNaught (First Nurse), George Catsi (Second Nurse), Paul Eprjesi (Surveillance Squad Detective), Paul Schnell (Worker), Traci Griffiths (Sonia)
18	18	"Bad Blood"	Mark Piper	Dave Worthington	17 June 1996
Dave becomes emotionally involved with the wife of a suspected serial killer only to have his empathy turned against him when the detectives uncover her involvement in her husband's horrific crimes. Co Starring: Peter Mochrie (John 'Knocker' Harrison). Guest Stars: Sarah Peirse (Margaret Roberts), Mark Hudson (Phillip Haynes), Peter Harvey-Wright (Paul Roberts), Anthony Cogin (Mark Ruscati), Liz Burch (Susan Webb), Sacha Horler (Christine Martin), Gonzalo Vargas (Fisherman), Kate McKnight (Blakemore's Friend), Frank Austin (Dead Merv), Enrico Babic (Radio Operator), Tony Byrne (Cruise Owner)
19	19	"Floater"	Chris Martin-Jones	Denise Morgan	1 July 1996
When Moira Randall's body is pulled from the harbour, Inspector Webb, in an attempt to keep their affair a secret, is slow to provide valuable information to the detectives investigating her murder. Co Starring: Peter Mochrie (John 'Knocker' Harrison). Guest Stars: Mary Regan (Caroline Cox), Liz Burch (Susan Webb), Michael Beckley (Roger Mulray), Gillian Hyde (Sarah Franklin), Blazey Best (Penny Randall), Jodie Matterson (Lucy), David Price (David), Enrico Babic (Radio Operator), Jenny Apostolou (Cynthia), Simon Elrahi (Yousef), Yigal Babluki (Farah), Graham Rhodes (Gordon), Brendon Donoghue (Michael), Keith Buckley (Mr Scali), Carmen Warrington (Mrs Scali), Digby Thomas (Ferry Captain), Angela McGrath (Florist)
20	20	"Missing"	Chris Martin-Jones	Peter Gawler	8 July 1996
The recovery of the body of a boy whose murder resembles those committed by Ross Beale, who was charged and subsequently imprisoned based on the work of the detectives. It raises questions as to whether police may have arrested the wrong man. Co Starring: Peter Mochrie (John 'Knocker' Harrison). Guest Stars: Scott Swalwel (Liam Parrish), Christopher Morsley (Ross Beale), David Franklin (Detective Snr Const Theodorou), Mary Regan (Snr Const Caroline Cox), Damian Monk (Snr Const Lance Stewart), Enrico Babic (Radio Operator), Ian Bliss (Colin Fleetwood), Celia Ireland (Sarah Fleetwood), Nellie McQuinn (Tegan Fleetwood), Bronte Pulman (Baby Fleetwood), Julie Hudspeth (Mrs Stewart), Lloyd Darling (Grant Stewart), Coral McGee (Ranger #1), Marcus Schultz (Ranger #2)
21	21	"Police Issue 13519"	Scott Hartford Davis	Anne Brooksbank	15 July 1996
The investigation into Kevin Holloway's death returns to the forefront when a young man is apprehended in the middle of a break and enter, and is found with Kevin's missing gun in his possession. The boy's father is Chris Kollias, Jim Pappas' solicitor, and he tells the detectives that he took the gun from a package in his father's safe. Co Starring: Peter Mochrie (John 'Knocker' Harrison). Guest Stars: Marilynne Paspaley (Helena Kollias), Joy Smithers (Gabi Cunningham), Danny Celoni (Nick Kollias), Craig Ashley (Chris Kollias), Angelo D'Angelo (Peter Mills), Enrico Babic (Radio Operator), James Happell (Nick's Friend)
22	22	"Unfinished Business"	Scott Hartford Davis	Sue Hore	22 July 1996
Chris Kollias, the man Frank suspects of knowing more about Kevin's death than he's saying, is reported missing. Fiona and Tommy stake out the beach to catch a flasher, and Gavin accompanies Rachel and Frank to a caravan park to look for leads in their investigation of the death of a resident who was stabbed, drugged, and beaten before finally drowning. Co Starring: Peter Mochrie (John 'Knocker' Harrison). Guest Stars: Marilynne Paspaley (Helena Kollias), Norman Kaye (Felix Friedman), Bob Ellis (Ron Briggs), Scott Major (Flasher), David Hoey (Freddie Spicer), Kim Hillas (Norma Irvine), Danny Celoni (Nick Kollias), Richard Healy (Brady), Enrico Babic (Radio Operator), Treffyn Koreshoff (David Goldstein), Jaye Paul (Stevie Cooper), Tamara Cook (Barb Cooper), Genevieve White (Toni Calhoun), Michelle Dyer (Ella Calhoun), Joanna Moore (Mrs Calhoun), Ronald Rodger (Detective O'Brien)
23	23	"Respect"	Mark Piper	Peter Gawler	29 July 1996
The recovery from the harbour of the bodies of two people who died of carbon monoxide poisoning leads the detectives to suspect a connection to the activities of Asian gangs. Frank and Rachel are joined by an Asian crime specialist from Task Force Oak to help them with the investigation. Hoping to find evidence connecting Knocker to Kevin's death, Inspector Brady coaxes Frank into doing a preliminary search of his house, but when Brady returns with a warrant, all of the implicating evidence is gone. Co Starring: Peter Mochrie (John 'Knocker' Harrison). Guest Stars: Kee Chan (Detective Derek Li), Richard Healy (Inspector Brady), Mai Xuan (Patrick Wu), Enrico Babic (Radio Operator), Mi Lei Zhen (Hunan Woman), Sky Tse (Hunan Clan Leader), Michael Parlato (Diver), Rose Semsarian (Cleaning Lady), Michael Withall (Ship's Captain)
24	24	"Wrecked"	Mark Piper	Tony Morphett	5 August 1996
The Nemesis crew come across a man attempting to bury the body of his murdered brother-in-law, but the story he eventually tells the detectives does not match the evidence found at the crime scene. Terry and Dave deal with two best friends who have been plundering a shipwreck. Both Helen and Jeff are ignored for the vacant position of Patrol Commander; Inspector Michael Farrell gets the job. Co Starring: Peter Mochrie (John 'Knocker' Harrison). Guest Stars: Helen Buday (Peggy Newland), Chris Haywood (Peter Anderson), Mark Lee (Harry Pierce), Sean O'Shea (Les Craig), Enrico Babic (Radio Operator), Richard Healy (Inspector Brady), Samuel Rodney (Inspector Heath), Gillian Hyde (Sarah Franklin), Darren Williams (Crime Scene Officer), Ed Rountree (William Newland), Tony Giuffre (Inspector Maloney), Heather Coady (Joy Watson)
25	25	"Message from the Dead"	Chris Martin-Jones	Michaeley O'Brien	12 August 1996
The discovery that a recent murder victim was a witness to the events surrounding Kevin's murder leads Frank and Brady on a search for other people who may have seen what happened the night Kevin was killed. Jeff appeals the decision of appointing Michael Farrell as Chief Inspector. Co Starring: Peter Mochrie (John 'Knocker' Harrison). Guest Stars: Richard Healy (Inspector Brady), Veronica Porcaro (Gemima Brierly), Jennifer Hardy (Lee-Anne Rheinberger), Tom Richards (Dan Manning), Enrico Babic (Radio Operator), Donna Gubbay (Kirsty Knight), Matthew Long (Mick Crowley), Lindy Sardelic (Joanne), Peter Astridge (Ross), Duncan Piney (Martin Muller), Bronte Pulman (Baby Tam), Joseph Williams (Yobbo #1), John Gibson (Minder #1)
26	26	"Knocker"	Chris Martin-Jones	Michaeley O'Brien	19 August 1996
Internal Affairs continues to track down Harrison while Frank and Brady race to locate the final two witnesses to Kevin's murder before Knocker can silence them for good. Frank and Brady inform Rachel of Knocker's involvement in Kevin's death, who has a hard time believing them at first. Co Starring: Peter Mochrie (John 'Knocker' Harrison). Guest Stars: Richard Healy (Inspector Brady), Norman Kaye (Felix Friedman), Jennifer Hardy (Lee-Anne Rheinberger), Treffyn Koreshoff (David Goldstein), Enrico Babic (Radio Operator), Lindy Sardelic (Joanne), Ineke Rapp (Kylee), Veronica Porcaro (Gemima Brierly), Jenny Apostolou (Cynthia), Danielle Baker (Mrs Jones), Christopher Saunders (Mr Jones), Barbara Baker (Mrs Salvi), Gep Bartlett (Male Wedding Guest), Mike Peros (Bride's Brother), Chris Castle (Detective #1) Note: This episode is also known as "And Then There Was One".

=== Season 2 (1997) ===
No. overall	No. in series	Title	Directed by	Written by	Original release date
27	1	"Recalled to Duty"	Catherine Millar	Tony Morphett	10 February 1997
Rachel returns to work after having shot her fiancé, corrupt detective John "Knocker" Harrison dead, and becomes annoyed when she is called "Gunner Goldstein" by a colleague with an unhealthy interest in what it's like to kill someone. Dave is injured by a spear from a booby-trapped sunken car loaded with stolen gold. Guest Stars: Anthony Lawrence, John Walton, Marshall Napier, Peter Mochrie, Treffyn Koreshoff.
28	2	"Closed Circuit"	Catherine Millar	Tony Morphett	17 February 1997
When a light aeroplane crashes in Sydney Harbour, the divers have the task of pulling out the passengers while Frank and Rachel investigate the pilot, the only survivor. A gun-shy Rachel tries to come to terms with her problem. Guest Stars: Chrissy Parker, Paul Mercurio, Kym Wilson.
29	3	"Import/Export (1)"	Mark Piper	Denise Morgan	24 February 1997
Rachel and Frank investigate when the owner of a shipping company is killed by a bomb down on the waterfront. But feelings between the pair sour when Frank becomes involved with the wife of the dead man. He insists she is a grieving widow, but the woman is on Rachel's suspect list. Fiona leaves the police service. Guest Stars: Felix Williamson, Imogen Annesley, Roger Ward, Treffyn Koreshoff, Carmen Warrington, Steve Jones, Steve Le Marquand. Note: Final appearance of Sophie Heathcote as Constable Fiona Cassidy.
30	4	"Jilted (2)"	Peter Andrikidis	Susan Hore	3 March 1997
Frank's involvement with Jennifer Campbell, one of the suspects in her husband's murder, increases despite strong warnings from Rachel. Frank soon becomes a target himself, but is he being threatened by the killer, or from the Melbourne detective obsessed with Jennifer himself? He is forced to learn a bitter truth: that people are not necessarily what they seem. Guest Stars: Felix Williamson, Imogen Annesley, Raelee Hill, Julie Haseler, Leverne McDonnell, Roger Ward, Ken Radley. Note: First appearance of Raelee Hill, who is listed as a guest star for a few episodes, before being promoted to the main cast.
31	5	"Truth or Dare"	Peter Andrikidis	Susan Hore	10 March 1997
Early on a rain-swept morning, the detectives are called out to a waterside warehouse where a distraught security guard has shot an escaping robber. The robber turns out to be a friend of Dave, who is determined to prove the guard is lying. Guest Stars: Alan Cinis, Julie Haseler, Leverne McDonnell, Raelee Hill, Tracy Mann, Harry Pavlidis.
32	6	"Give Me Money"	Peter Andrikidis	Susan Hore	17 March 1997
When a smoke bomb goes off inside a waterfront restaurant, Rachel and Frank find out that the owners are being blackmailed. The detectives go undercover in the restaurant to try to learn who the extortionist is, and it is Frank who is then given the task of delivering a bag of cash. In a tense operation, he criss-crosses the harbour following the extortionist's instructions before making the final drop-off. Guest Stars: Raelee Hill, Zachery McKay, Daniel Mitchell, Lucy Bell, Daniel Rigney.
33	7	"End of the Line"	Chris Martin-Jones	Anne Brooksbank	24 March 1997
Rachel realises how little control parents have over the lives of their children when she and Frank investigate the death of a 22-year-old girl at a party. Christina Lambert collapsed from a drug overdose at a fashion party, but why was this girl, who her friends and family deny was a drug user, taking amphetamines? Guest Stars: Raelee Hill, Treffyn Koreshoff, Anna Volska, Graham Harvey, Tony Barry.
34	8	"Wrong Place, Wrong Time"	Chris Martin-Jones	Anne Brooksbank	31 March 1997
Tommy decides to take an early morning ferry ride to work, but the ferry collides with a large fishing trawler. He tries his best to control the panic, risking his own life to help passengers escape before the ferry sinks. In the aftermath of the disaster, Tayler unknowingly hands robbery proceeds back to a thief, while Gavin looks into the life of his double - Gavin Sykes - who was killed in the crash. Rachel and Frank try to find out who was at fault in the accident. Guest Stars: Raelee Hill, Bec Cartwright, Hugh Sexton, John Alansu, Ken Snodgrass, Paul Rogers, Martin Vaughan.
35	9	"Sex Games"	Alister Hallum	David Allen	7 April 1997
Terry jeopardizes his career when he falls into bed with Gina Downie, a woman he rescued when her dive into a shipwreck went wrong. Believing their rendezvous to be just a one-night stand, Terry tries to give her the flick, but she has more sinister intentions which culminate in a near fatal attack on Terry. Frank and Rachel try to solve the mystery of a woman found floating in the harbour. Was she murdered or did she commit suicide? Guest Stars: Raelee Hill, Hélène Joy, Noel Hodda, Ross Anderson, Yvette Alcott. Note: Final main cast appearance from Aaron Jeffery.
36	10	"Eye for an Eye"	Alister Hallum	Serge Lazareff	14 April 1997
Tayler falls for a handsome man named Brett Boyce, who is an operator of a water taxi company. She soon becomes entangled in the conflict between Brett and his older brother Liam, who works for a rival business. The Nemesis crew are called upon to rescue a sixteen-year-old boy who is attempting to sail around the continent. Guest Stars: Justin Rosniak, Tamblyn Lord. Note: Raelee Hill is added to the main cast from this episode onwards.
37	11	"Goldie's Trip"	Mark Piper	Russell Haig	21 April 1997
Frank takes Rachel out to dinner, trying to shift his relationship with her to a bit more of a personal footing, but his efforts are thwarted when an old friend calls her for help. Rachel goes undercover as a drug courier aboard an incoming yacht from Thailand, but things go terribly wrong when her cover is blown and the desperate drug dealers kidnap her at gunpoint. Guest Stars: David Field, Jon Bennett, Kieran Darcy-Smith, Marin Mimica, Kim Deacon, Michael Manuel, Paula Arundell, Owen Buick.
38	12	"One Dead Rat"	Guy Norris	Russell Haig	28 April 1997
Three criminals, including those who kidnapped and terrorised Rachel, make a dramatic escape from a prison van and try to make their getaway in a stolen boat on the Parramatta River. Meanwhile, the tensions between Jeff and Helen escalate. Guest Stars: David Field, Jon Bennett, Anne Tenney, Marin Mimica, Ursula Brooks.
39	13	"The Messenger"	Peter Andrikidis	Victoria Custo	5 May 1997
Jeff is surprised when a psychic tells him she has had a 'vision' about a missing girl. With some reluctance, the detectives are brought onto the case. Rachel establishes a rapport with the psychic but Frank is skeptical of her. Is she genuine or is she just after the $10,000 reward money being offered by the girl's parents? Rachel meets a man - and creates a new career for herself. Guest Stars: John Adam, Julie Godfrey, Kelly Dale, Leslie Dayman, Paul Pantano, Clodagh Crowe, Isabella Gutierrez, Vanessa Downing.
40	14	"The Man in the Moon"	Peter Andrikidis	Anne Brooksbank	12 May 1997
The Nemesis crew hear gunshots coming from inside a yacht in the dead of night. Boarding the yacht, they are shocked to find a bloodbath; two dead bodies and a badly injured woman who makes a garbled statement about "the man in the moon" before dying. Frank and Rachel investigate the shooter, a supposedly happily married real estate agent who in fact, is leading a double life. Guest Stars: John Adam, Julie Godfrey, Alex Jones, Leslie Dayman, Walter Sullivan, Paul Boardman, John Clayton, Diane Smith.
41	15	"Stolen Time"	Chris Martin-Jones	Denise Morgan	19 May 1997
The detectives are called in to investigate when a young woman is reported missing. It is believed that she was being stalked by an admirer called "Desperate Dave". Gavin, Tayler and Tommy attempt to outwit a couple of bag snatchers at Darling Harbour, but their pursuit is halted when Tayler falls overboard. Guest Stars: Anja Coleby, Alex Morcos, Jenny Morris, Rachael Blake, Arky Michael.
42	16	"Fireworks"	Chris Martin-Jones	Denise Morgan	26 May 1997
The Water Police are called to a robbery scene where a quantity of fireworks were stolen off a barge. Just as they arrive at the scene, an explosion sends the owner and his assistant flying. A few school kids were seen running from the barge, and one of them turns out to be Jeff's son, Rick. Will he have to arrest his own son? Guest Stars: Anne Tenney, Mike Miller, Mitchell McMahon, Steve Cox, Andrew James, Roy Billing, Damon Herriman, Ben Harvey.
43	17	"Shroud Lines"	Geoffrey Nottage	Tony Morphett	2 June 1997
Rachel and her new man, Michael Jeffries, are guests at a wedding on a ship called "The Bounty." The romantic setting is shattered when a body falls from the sails. Rachel quickly sets aside her wine taster persona and turns professional in her detective role, putting her relationship with Michael on the line. Frank and Rachel unravel the mystery of the dead body, which takes on a much bigger profile when an extortionist claims the killing is part of a planned terrorist attack on the Australian tourism industry. Guest Stars: John Adam, Gary Vincent, Allan Lovell, Matt Doran, Tony Ingersent, Niki Owen.
44	18	"Hunting Season"	Geoffrey Nottage	Peter Gawler	9 June 1997
The resources of the Water Police are stretched to the limit when the US Navy cruises into Sydney Harbour during the Mardi Gras weekend. Rachel and Frank join the boat crew in trying to keep order on the harbour as a flotilla of fanatical environmental protesters hinder the Navy's arrival. The weekend takes a violent turn when a teenager is found bashed and left for dead in the Water Police car park. Guest Stars: John Adam, Judith Wright, Blazey Best, Barry Quin, Rupert Reid, John Rohan.
45	19	"Blood Trail (1)"	Peter Andrikidis	Vicki Madden	16 June 1997
When a body that was cut into pieces is pulled from Sydney Harbour, and is found to be that of a Melbourne woman, Rachel and Frank travel to Melbourne to investigate. The woman's son has disappeared and it seems her sister, as well as a shady King Street nightclub owner, know more than they are willing to let on. Guest Stars: Aaron Blabey, Anthony Martin, Bridie Carter, Essie Davis, Kelly Dale, Shane Withington, Simon Burke, Suzi Dougherty, Maggie Blinco, Paul Caesar. Note: Parts of this episode were filmed in Melbourne.
46	20	"Dead or Alive (2)"	Peter Andrikidis	Susan Hore	23 June 1997
The investigation into the death of Melissa Davies continues in Melbourne, but the stakes are raised with the knowledge that her son, Jordan, is still alive. Fearing that Jordan may have witnessed his mother's murder, the detectives are desperate to find him before he is killed as well. Guest Stars: Aaron Blabey, Salvatore Coco, Bridie Carter, Essie Davis, Michael Perry, Shane Withington, Simon Burke, Suzi Dougherty. Note: Parts of this episode were filmed in Melbourne.
47	21	"All at Sea"	Chris Martin-Jones	Michael Miller	30 June 1997
When Frank goes on an overseas attachment, Rachel has difficulty adjusting to her new partner, Tom Clancy, after the two are thrown together to investigate a mysterious drowning. Sam Bailey competes in a diving competition which ends in tragedy. Guest Stars: Kelly Dale, Andrew Tighe, Bruce Venables, Claudia Black, David Hayden, Desmond Kelly, Jamie Oxenbould.
48	22	"Retribution"	Chris Martin-Jones	Anne Brooksbank and Vicki Madden	7 July 1997
Frank, Tommy and Gavin investigate the death of a bikie who was gunned down in a harbourside park. Packages of drugs found floating in the harbour keep the dive team busy as Dave tries to ease a shaken Sam Bailey back to work after the death of a fellow diver during a competition. Guest Stars: Kelly Dale, John Walton, Colin Taylor, Felicity Price, Kevin Healy, Paul Kelman, Peter O'Brien.
49	23	"Smile (1)"	Peter Andrikidis	Tony Morphett	14 July 1997
Frank is investigated by Tony Brady of Internal Affairs after a petty criminal taken to the station for questioning accuses Frank of assaulting him while in custody. To keep busy while the investigation continues, Rachel and Frank investigate a series of safe robberies in which evidence at the crime scenes all points to inside jobs. Guest Stars: Kelly Dale, Douglas Hedge, John Adam, Richard Healy, Antonia Murphy, Harry Cripps, Phillip Gordon, Sarah Chadwick.
50	24	"Deadfall (2)"	Peter Andrikidis	Tony Morphett	21 July 1997
When Sam Jones is found murdered in his home, Frank immediately becomes the prime suspect. Rachel and Frank investigate the disappearance of a young barmaid, Livvy, last seen alive by Tayler, when they were in the same taxi together. Guest Stars: Kelly Dale, Douglas Hedge, John Adam, Richard Healy, Ben Tari, Michael Danek, Blazey Best, Taylor Owynns.
51	25	"The Witness (3)"	Guy Norris	Margaret Wilson	28 July 1997
Frank is charged with the murder of Sam Jones and as a result, suspended from police duties. Meanwhile, Rachel sets out to clear his name with a bit of help from her new partner - Gavin. Believing Frank was set up by Melbourne crime figure Charlie Hayes to discredit him as a witness in Gary Travis' upcoming trial, Rachel sets out to locate Ronny Jefferson. Ronny is a witness to the Melissa Davies murder, and the only other person whose evidence can convict Travis. Guest Stars: Kelly Dale, Douglas Hedge, Richard Healy, Jen Apostolou, Richard Norton, David Spencer, Eric Oldfield, Jessica Napier, Noah Taylor.
52	26	"The Cleaner (4)"	Guy Norris	Denise Morgan	4 August 1997
Having discovered who killed Sam Jones and Ronny Jefferson, Frank decides to set himself up as bait in an attempt to catch the killer. Rachel has an important decision to make regarding her future when Michael proposes - her lover or her partner. Guest Stars: John Adam, Kelly Dale, Richard Norton, Richard Healy, David Callan, Michael Barnacoat, Nicholas Stribakos, Sebastian Huber.

=== Season 3 (1998) ===
No. overall	No. in series	Title	Directed by	Written by	Original release date
53	1	"As Fast As You Can"	Geoffrey Nottage	Tony Morphett	9 February 1998
Liz Robinson, Frank's second ex-wife, goes to him for help and protection from a blackmailer who has photos of her having cocaine snorted from her stomach. The Nemesis crew capture a trio of escaped felons and locate the father of a young boy found trying to sail home to New Zealand by himself. Guest Stars: Rebecca Hobbs, Anthony Phelan, Erik Thomson, Hugh Baldwin, Judith Wright, Tim McCunn, Michael Magee, Nicholas McKay, Peter Hayes, Steve Morris.
54	2	"The Gingerbread Man"	Geoffrey Nottage	Tony Morphett	9 February 1998
Liz Robinson, Frank's second ex-wife, goes to him for help and protection from a blackmailer who has photos of her having cocaine snorted from her stomach. The Nemesis crew capture a trio of escaped felons and locate the father of a young boy found trying to sail home to New Zealand by himself. Guest Stars: Rebecca Hobbs, Anthony Phelan, Erik Thomson, Hugh Baldwin, Michael Magee, Judith Wright, Tim McCunn, Joan Millar, Bryan Andrews. Note: Aired back to back with episode 1.
55	3	"For Old Time's Sake"	Mark Piper	Ellie Beaumont	16 February 1998
When Liz is nearly run down in front of him, Frank, fearing for her safety following her husband's murder in prison, suggests that she should stay with him. Tommy's relationship with Rhonda comes to a tragic end. Guest Stars: Rebecca Hobbs, Dennis Coard, Dane Carson, Geoff Barker, Judith Wright, Diana McLean, Marcus Schultz, Linda Caruthers, Nathy Gaffney.
56	4	"One for the Social Workers"	Stephen Mann	Margaret Wilson	23 February 1998
While Frank is away, Rachel and substitute partner Jack Christey take on surveillance duty to catch a rapist who has been abducting women from parked cars and assaulting them. Dave and Tommy are sent out onto white-water rapids on a rescue operation. Still hurting from his own loss, Tommy takes it upon himself to deliver a result and find the missing man. Guest Stars: Steve Bisley, Steve Cox, Dianne Weller, Shane Alexander, Stephen Hayden, Yanna Black, David Edwards, Derek Armistead. Note: First appearance of Steve Bisley as Detective Jack Christey.
57	5	"Sympathy for the Devil"	Chris Martin-Jones	Peter Gawler	2 March 1998
Rachel and Tommy, who is standing in for Frank, investigate the arson of a boat inside which the nude body of a teenage boy is later found. The owner of the boat has a dubious affinity with young boys, but is he the culprit or another victim? Guest Stars: David Downer, John Walton, Julian Garner, Treffyn Koreshoff, Adam Cooper, Jamie Croft, Joshua Campbell, Matt Jenkins, Lynette Curran.
58	6	"Bloody Kids"	David Caesar	Margaret Wilson	10 March 1998
When Rachel and Tommy arrest a teenager for break and enter, they discover that he is Dave's son, and have to charge him with the supplying and trafficking of illegal drugs. As a result, the pressure of balancing work and home life gets to Dave. A quantity of stolen explosives are used in an attempted bombing of the Harbour tunnel. Guest Stars: Aaron Jeffery, Abe Forsythe, Zachery McKay, John Allen, Tim Hunter.
59	7	"Behind Closed Doors (1)"	Mark Piper	Denise Morgan	17 March 1998
Frank and Rachel investigate a domestic dispute when a woman claims that her husband stabbed her. After the Nemesis crew intervenes in a dockside brawl, Tayler loses her confidence and requests desk duty having been unable to contain a violent suspect. Guest Stars: Inge Hornstra, Nicholas Opolski, Rebecca Hobbs, Robyn Gibbes, Scott McGregor, Barbara Morton, Sean Kennedy.
60	8	"The Long Haul (2)"	Chris Langman	Denise Morgan	17 March 1998
When Frank becomes caught in the middle of a siege with the estranged father, Rachel must use her negotiating skills to help him and the other hostages gain their freedom. Guest Stars: Inge Hornstra, Nicholas Opolski, Rebecca Hobbs, Robyn Gibbes, Scott McGregor, Lawrence Woodward, John Walton, Johnny Raaen, Tim Jones. Note: Aired back to back with episode 7.
61	9	"Die For Me"	Stephen Mann	Vicki Madden	31 March 1998
While Frank is away in Melbourne for a job interview, Rachel and Tommy try to hunt down a serial killer who has a rather strange way of leaving their victim's bodies. Guest Stars: Guy Leslie, Anthony Martin, Blaise Cooper, Gary Vincent, Alan Russell, Monette Lee, Anne Grigg, Elizabeth Fleming, Jason Hayes.
62	10	"Old Dogs, Old Tricks"	Chris Langman	Michael Miller	7 April 1998
Frank and Rachel investigate an extortion racket in Chinatown, in which Terry Madigan is possibly involved. And meanwhile, Gavin and Jeff compete against each other in an 18ft skiff race. Guest Stars: Ritchie Singer, Rebecca Hobbs, Anthony Wong, Graham Turner, Paul Hunt, Yina Lee, Augustine Lau, Greg Patterson.
63	11	"Run for the Money"	Chris Martin-Jones	Chris Hawkshaw	14 April 1998
Rachel and Helen investigate the violent kidnapping of a diamond broker's wife, an incident that Helen thinks is a striking resemblance to the disappearance of his first wife seven years earlier. Dave has to cope with the pressures of running the station in Hawker's absence, finding his runaway son, and preventing his marriage from disintegrating. Things for Dave aren't helped when the Water Police are assigned to contain a media frenzy as teen pop sensation Milkshake film their latest music video on the harbour. Guest Stars: Allison Cratchley, Abe Forsythe, Brooke Anderson, Rohan Michael, Tiriel Mora, Christine Stephen-Daly, Matthew O'Sullivan. Note: First appearance of Allison Cratchley as Emma Woods. Music: Sweeter Than Sweet performed by Brooke Anderson.
64	12	"A Little Knowledge (1)"	Stephen Wallace	Denise Morgan	21 April 1998
Frank goes undercover and poses as a criminal in an attempt to expose an armed robbery operation. Things get a little complicated when it is revealed that the man Frank is pretending to be, has a girlfriend. Guest Stars: Allison Cratchley, Dominic Purcell, Michele Fawdon, Sonia Todd, Teo Gebert, Terry Serio, Beth Champion.
65	13	"Double Play (2)"	Stephen Wallace	Denise Morgan	28 April 1998
The undercover operation involving Frank becomes increasingly more dangerous as the armed robbery gets closer. Despite the police's ongoing investigation, Les is granted bail and threatens to blow Frank and Louise's cover. The divers recover Cheryl's body from the harbour. Frank is forced to act as the getaway driver during the robbery but a sudden change in plans throws off the police surveillance unit and puts Frank's life on the line. Guest Stars: Allison Cratchley, Dominic Purcell, Michele Fawdon, Sonia Todd, Teo Gebert, Terry Serio, Beth Champion.
66	14	"Soft Target"	Chris Martin-Jones	Peter Neale	5 May 1998
Rachel and Helen investigate the disappearance of a young girl and the subsequent murder of the woman suspected of her kidnapping. Further complications arise when it is revealed that Terry is the father of the missing girl. Guest Stars: Allison Cratchley, Aaron Jeffery, Anthony Martin, David Terry, Elizabeth Maywald, John Walton, Anna Lise-Phillips, John Derum, Katrina Foster.
67	15	"Not Fade Away"	David Caesar	Peter Gawler	12 May 1998
When armed-robber Kiwi Dave pins Frank to the ground, holds a gun to his head and pulls the trigger, his near-death experience leads him on a one-man anti-gun campaign and a journey of self-discovery. Meanwhile, Helen is promoted to the rank of Senior Sergeant. Guest Stars: Christopher Dibb, Kieran Darcy-Smith, Robert Carlton, Treffyn Koreshoff, Archer Lyttle.
68	16	"Romeo is Bleeding"	Peter Andrikidis	Vicki Madden	19 May 1998
When Jack Christey, Frank's temporary replacement, boards a boat to try and apprehend a teenager who is in an armed stand-off with the Water Police, the boy panics and in the ensuing confusion, both he and Tayler are shot. Tayler's near-fatal shooting prompts a reunion between Helen and her estranged brother. Guest Stars: Steve Bisley, Allison Cratchley, Christopher Dibb, Paul Pantano, John Walton, Peter Sumner, Peter Fisher.
69	17	"Heads or Tales"	Peter Andrikidis	Chris McCourt	26 May 1998
Rachel and Jack investigate when a gym bag containing a man's severed head is found washed up on a beach. Meanwhile, Tommy and Gavin's pursuit of a young boy comes under scrutiny when the boy disappears after diving into the harbour in an attempt to evade the officer. Guest Stars: Steve Bisley, Allison Cratchley, Anthony Martin, John Walton, Jen Apostolou, Anthony Hayes, Lorna Lesley, Renato Bartolomei, Scott McRae, Susie Porter.
70	18	"Mocha Fudge"	Chris Martin-Jones	Andrew Kelly	2 June 1998
An old police friend of Frank's is caught up in a drug dealing operation that uses an ice-cream boat, and its ice-cream, as a cover. Tommy, Gavin and Dave respond to a robbery at the wharves and wind up in a bar brawl as they track down a number of stolen VCRs. Guest Stars: Allison Cratchley, Kim Hillas, Doug Bowles, Jason Coleman, Josef Ber, Joel McIlroy, Rhonda Doyle.
71	19	"Let The Dead"	Chris Martin-Jones	Tony Morphett	9 June 1998
Jeff finds himself in the line of fire when ballistic tests prove that his gun was used to kill Vince Blake eight years ago. He and Rachel work together to clear his name. Meanwhile, Tommy finds himself in the middle of a dispute at the site of an archeological dig. Guest Stars: Anthony Martin, Anne Tenney, Jen Apostolou, Mitchell McMahon, Jack Mayers, Ritchie Singer, Leah Purcell, Louise Howitt, Bruce Stewart.
72	20	"Diminished Responsibility"	Chris Martin-Jones	Grant McAloon	16 June 1998
The apprehension of the man responsible for the robbery of a group of tourists leads the detectives into the investigation of illegal steroid dealing at a local gym. When an accident pins a pregnant woman's arm underneath a boat, Rachel, the Nemesis crew and the divers have no choice but to deliver her baby underwater as the tide comes in and submerges the woman. Soon after, they become involved in a murder case when the child's father is found dead as a result of a gunshot to the head. Guest Stars: Allison Cratchley, Anthony Martin, Damian Rice, Tara Morice, Stuart Fenton, Rene Naufahu, Grant Thompson.
73	21	"Watery Grave"	Mark Piper	Susan Hore	23 June 1998
With Rachel away, Frank and Helen investigate the disappearance of an environmental activist who they believe is responsible for an explosive protest that put one man in hospital. Meanwhile, Gavin tries to determine what happened to a triathlon competitor who vanished during a race that was being overseen by the Nemesis crew. Guest Stars: Allison Cratchley, Anthony Martin, John Walton, Anita Hegh, Anthony Simcoe, Craig Elliott, Matthew Lilley, Mark Owen-Taylor, Marie-Louise Walker. Note: From this episode onwards, Steve Bisley is listed in the opening credits.
74	22	"Six Hundred Clear a Week"	Scott Hartford Davis	Peter Gawler	30 June 1998
"Kiwi" Dave Crowe manages to escape from custody and makes it his own personal mission to make Frank's life a misery. His vendetta though, takes a toll on Frank's relationship with Louise and she breaks up with him. Guest Stars: Allison Cratchley, Sonia Todd, Robert Carlton, Anthony Lawrence, Kristy Hillhouse, Anthony Kierann.
75	23	"Untouchable"	Peter Andrikidis	Margaret Wilson	7 July 1998
When Rachel, Gavin and Tommy board a stolen cruiser they found drifting in the harbour, they are shocked to find Judge Moreton bound, gagged, and wearing very little clothing. Frank's interest in the case is heightened when he learns that the son of Terry Madigan is involved. Guest Stars: Allison Cratchley, Anthony Martin, Ritchie Singer, Kath Gordon, Patrick Blackwell, Anthony Lawrence, John Myers, Paul Chubb, Roxane Wilson, Melissa Bell, Les Hill.
76	24	"Switchback"	Scott Hartford Davis	Tony Morphett	14 July 1998
When a woman sees a base jumper plunge to his death, Jack is convinced the dead man's three friends know more about the incident than they are letting on. Dave sends Tayler's dive-instructor boyfriend off on a wild-goose chase in search of a sunken Japanese submarine rumoured to be in the harbour. Guest Stars: Allison Cratchley, Kerry Casey, Darrin Klimek, Chris Mitchell, Tim Elliott, Vivienne Walshe, Jerome Ehlers.
77	25	"Somebody to Love"	Mark Piper	Michaeley O'Brien	21 July 1998
Gavin pulls the body of his girlfriend from her car after he sees her vehicle plunge into the harbour. Unfortunately though, he can't save her life. Jack tries to keep Gavin off the case, by asking Helen to help him investigate the woman's death when evidence of foul play is found. Guest Stars: Allison Cratchley, Joy Miller, Wayne Cull, Anthony Martin, Tim Elliott, Amos Szeps.
78	26	"Epiphany"	Scott Hartford Davis	Andrew Kelly	28 July 1998
Rachel becomes the obsession of a mentally unstable woman named Sarah Ackroyd, who loves religious omens and is controlled by an equally unstable lover. When Rachel stops her from jumping off a cliff, a bizarre string of events follow and it soon becomes apparent that not only is Sarah toying with Rachel's emotions, she is possibly involved in a murder that is being investigated by Rachel and Jack. Guest Stars: Michael Miller, Chris Kelly, Allison Cratchley, John Noble, Simmone MacKinnon, Marc Gray, T'mara Buckmaster, David Whitney.
79	27	"Honour Amongst Thieves (1)"	Scott Hartford Davis	Denise Morgan	4 August 1998
Inspector Barry Strong from Internal Affairs arrives at the Water Police when uniforms belonging to Gavin and Tommy are worn by two men so that they can steal money. When Helen's name comes up in the I.A investigation, she is suspended from work. Guest Stars: Alan Dukes, John Batchelor, Allison Cratchley, David Roberts, Ritchie Singer, John Walton.
80	28	"Trust (2)"	Michael Offer	Amanda Higgs & Bill Searle	11 August 1998
Frank and Rachel do everything they possibly can to clear Helen of any wrongdoing. Their investigation takes a turn when Terry Madigan's name is mentioned, much to the delight of Frank, who has been wanting to get Madigan in jail for years. Jack uses the Water Police divers when his informant tells him that there is a body of a known drug courier at the bottom of the harbour. Guest Stars: Alan Dukes, John Batchelor, Allison Cratchley, Sally Strecker, Ritchie Singer, John Walton, David Roberts, D. J. Foster, Christopher Baz, Peter Phelps, Sonia Todd.
81	29	"War Games (3)"	Michael Offer	Elizabeth Packett	18 August 1998
Frank and Rachel are caught in the middle of the feud between Terry Madigan and Jimmy Formica, as it begins to get personal. The rekindled romance between Frank and undercover cop Louise Bradshaw is short-lived when Louise is gunned down when she is caught in a shoot-out between the warring drug dealers. Helen is reluctant to return to the service and considers a new line of work, but Rachel manages to change her mind. Guest Stars: Anthony Thomas, Allison Cratchley, Ritchie Singer, John Walton, Paul Tassone, Peter Phelps, Sonia Todd, Michela Noonan.
82	30	"Last Impressions (4)"	Mark Piper	James Cohen	25 August 1998
As the conflict between Madigan and Formica intensifies, Frank's life hangs in the balance and he is forced to rely on his arch enemy, in Madigan, to survive. Guest Stars: Anthony Thomas, Allison Cratchley, Ritchie Singer, John Walton, Peter Phelps, Sal Sharah, Anthony Martin.
83	31	"Old Bones"	Mark Piper	Peter Gawler	1 September 1998
When a cruise ship with mostly rich people on board enters Sydney Harbour, Rachel and Frank uncover a possible jewelry heist that is about to take place. The investigation leads them to believe that some of the ship's crew are involved. Dave and the other divers find a number of human bones at the bottom of the harbour, which belonged to a child. Guest Stars: Allison Cratchley, Mercia Deane-Johns, Anthony Martin, Julian Garner, Helen Scott, Gerard Maguire, Peter Talmacs.

=== Season 4 (1999) ===
No. overall	No. in series	Title	Directed by	Written by	Original release date
84	1	"Fair Cop"	David Caesar	Amanda Higgs	16 February 1999
The Nemesis crew and the divers are kept busy responding to a series of suicide hoaxes. Frank and Rachel play host to a detective from Scotland Yard who has been sent to Australia to take possession of $5 million in recovered diamonds, but nothing about the man is as it seems. Guest Stars: Philip Holder, Allison Cratchley, John Walton, Anthony Martin.
85	2	"A Woman of Substance"	David Caesar	Denise Morgan	23 February 1999
Gavin, Tayler and Tommy find a man who has had his hand nailed to a tree by his neighbor. The detectives then learn that his wife is missing, and they later find out that she has been murdered. Guest Stars: Andrea Moor, Allison Cratchley, John Walton, Francis Greenslade, David Paterson, Jonno Zissler, Liz Burch, Crystal Cooke, Laurence Coy.
86	3	"Double Blind"	Ian Gilmour	Tim Pye	2 March 1999
A homeless boy becomes trapped in a pylon in the harbour, and while rescuing him, the divers discover a dead body floating in the water beside him. Helen takes it upon herself to ensure the homeless boy is taken care of, she begins to develop a relationship with the boy's lawyer, Gillian Swain, who is quick to file a lawsuit on the boy's behalf. Rachel and Frank meanwhile work to unravel the mystery of the body found inside the pylon. Guest Stars: Anthony Martin, Ashton Cartwright, Allison Cratchley, John Walton, Mitchell McMahon, Patricia Pitney, Gabrielle Adkins, Liz Burch, Wayne Pygram, Rebecca Barrett, Steve Cox.
87	4	"Cut Off Point"	Ian Gilmour	Chris McCourt	9 March 1999
A severed penis is found washed up on a beach. The search is then on to find the victim, and the detectives soon find themselves dealing with reports of a stalker and a subsequent kidnapping. Are they connected? Guest Stars: Simone Kessell, Kieran Darcy-Smith, Allison Cratchley, John Walton, Michael Burgess, Suzanne Devery, Justin Rosniak, Jack Ellis, Susan Rigg, Dan Holliday, Jeanette James.
88	5	"In The Family Way"	Ray Quint	Tony Morphett	16 March 1999
Rachel and Frank investigate when a prominent family is carrying out million dollar heists on boats in Sydney Harbour. When their latest robbery goes terribly wrong, the family is torn apart - not so much by the police intervening, but by the in-fighting, backstabbing, and betrayal. Guest Stars: Liz Burch, Shirley Cameron, Denise Kirby, Duncan Young, Matthew Charleston, Shane McNamara, Allison Cratchley, John Walton, Rebecca Barrett, Lis Fell, Ron Brown, Rona Coleman, Adam Grossetti, Tim Elliott.
89	6	"Santiago Rain"	Ray Quint	Andrew Kelly	23 March 1999
A crooked grandmother, a fraudulent stockbroker and a water taxi driver who gets taken for a ride, all baffle the detectives. Meanwhile, Blakemore's romance comes to an abrupt end. Guest Stars: Liz Burch, Brett Climo, Simone Buchanan, Dean Dunstone, Peggy Thompson, Marcia Neal, Michael Lill, Pauline Fiddes, Allison Cratchley
90	7	"End Game"	Michael Offer	Tim Pye	6 April 1999
Holloway and Goldie's partnership is shaken when a third detective, Michael Reilly, is assigned to the Water Police. Guest Stars: Aaron Pedersen's first appearance
91	8	"Tomorrow Never Comes"	Michael Offer	Tony Morphett	13 April 1999
Holloway and Goldie's partnership is shaken when a third detective, Michael Reilly, is assigned to the Water Police. Guest Stars: Last appearance of Colin Friels as Det Snr Constable Frank Holloway
92	9	"Goes with the Territory"	Mark Piper	Anne Brooksbank	20 April 1999
The working relationship between Jack Christey and Goldie gets off to a rocky start. Already compromised by their past affair, further strain is added when Jack insists on taking the lead in a murder case involving an old acquaintance. Guest Stars:
93	10	"Fish Out of the Water"	Mike Piper	Adam Todd	27 April 1999
Police constable Tayler Johnson becomes romantically involved with a cop on a diving course, but while out on a dive, he goes missing and Tayler realizes how little she knows about him. Guest Stars:
94	11	"Good Times and Adventures"	Unknown	Unknown	4 May 1999
A swingers' party at a harbourside home is interrupted by two masked robbers. When the host is later found murdered, detectives Reilly and Goldstein must go undercover at a well-known swingers' haunt in an attempt to coax a confession out of their suspects. Guest Stars:
95	12	"Blood Relations"	Unknown	Unknown	11 May 1999
Reilly's friendship with Sydney madam Susie Abromovich results in them both being taken hostage by a pair of armed robbers. Guest Stars:
96	13	"Dial C for Cop"	Unknown	Unknown	18 May 1999
Christey feels responsible when a grieving woman, whose brother was killed in an armed robbery, takes the law into her own hands and holds him and a suspect hostage. Guest Stars:
97	14	"Quad Squad"	Unknown	Unknown	25 May 1999
The investigation into the suicide of a young man reveals a greater tragedy, a secret that will ultimately destroy the lives of all those involved. Guest Stars:
98	15	"Unauthorised Entry"	Unknown	Unknown	1 June 1999
Jack Christey and Rachel Goldstein race to save two young girls whose lives are at stake when they inadvertently become caught up in a drug smuggling ring. Guest Stars:
99	16	"Mother Love"	Unknown	Unknown	8 June 1999
A grisly case hits home when Jeff Hawker's wife, Gail, becomes the target of a vicious serial rapist and killer. Guest Stars:
100	17	"I'm Home"	Unknown	Unknown	15 June 1999
Goldie faces every mother's worst nightmare when her son David becomes the victim of a brutal and vicious kidnapper. Guest Stars:
101	18	"The Drill"	Unknown	Unknown	22 June 1999
A burning body is found floating on a sail board in the harbour; Jack Christey recognizes the work of a killer who is still in jail; did Christey convict the wrong man? Guest Stars:
102	19	"Green Light"	Unknown	Unknown	29 June 1999
A spate of armed hold-ups have Goldie and Jack chasing a robber dressed like a cowboy from the wild west. Guest Stars:
103	20	"Red Light"	Unknown	Unknown	6 July 1999
Our two Aussie heroes, Rachel Goldstein and Jack Christey, investigate the theft of valuable art work from a harbourside property owned by a once famous madam, Sadie the Scissors. Guest Stars:
104	21	"Can't Buy Me Love"	Unknown	Unknown	20 July 1999
While investigating the murder of a thief and his missing haul of black opals, Goldie and Christey stumble upon an unexpected love triangle. Guest Stars:
105	22	"Free as a Bird"	Unknown	Unknown	27 July 1999
When a young boy's dead body is found, Goldie and Jack have to prove who is responsible before an enraged local community exacts their own just on the main suspect. Guest Stars:
106	23	"Dangerous Encounters"	Unknown	Unknown	3 August 1999
Goldie and Jack are kidnapped and hunted like animals by a murderer who sees his victims as prey. Guest Stars:
107	24	"Force of Habit"	Unknown	Unknown	10 August 1999
Investigating the murder of a wealthy businessman and the apparent kidnap of his second wife, Jeff Hawker is reacquainted with a woman he once loved but lost to another man. Guest Stars:
108	25	"Shark Bait"	Unknown	Unknown	17 August 1999
When a man is taken by a shark in the harbour, the water police uncover a complex web of embezzlement, a faked death, underworld connections and a bizarre betrayal. Guest Stars:
109	26	"A Day at the Office"	Unknown	Unknown	31 August 1999
What starts as another ordinary day at the office ends in the death of a Goldie a much loved rat. Guest Stars:
110	27	"Kaddish"	Unknown	Unknown	7 September 1999
The surviving Rats swear revenge for their fallen comrade. Guest Stars: Last appearance of Catherine McClements as Det Snr Constable Rachel Goldstein
111	28	"For Love or Money"	Unknown	Unknown	14 September 1999
Jack believes he has discovered the identity of Goldie's killer, but his only clue may just slip through his fingers. Guest Stars:
112	29	"Helter Skelter"	Unknown	Unknown	21 September 1999
Jack hands in his badge and turns vigilante in order to find Goldie's killer. Guest Stars:
113	30	"Friend or Foe"	Unknown	Unknown	28 September 1999
Friendships are tested when Mick Reilly's best mate becomes embroiled in a murder investigation. Guest Stars:
114	31	"Mr. Medium"	Unknown	Unknown	5 October 1999
Jack is forced into a deal with undercover cops when Detective Alex St Clare joins the rats and there is a conflict of interest in a murder investigation. Guest Stars: Dee Smart's first episode
115	32	"New Kid on the Block"	Unknown	Unknown	12 October 1999
Jack fights to save the life of an undercover cop, Alex St Clare whom he suspects is emotionally involved with her target. Guest Stars: Final appearance of Raelee Hill as Constable Tayler Johnson

=== Season 5 (2000) ===
No. overall	No. in series	Title	Original release date
116	1	"A Day to Remember (Break Your Heart)"	22 February 2000
A helicopter crashes into an overcrowded pleasure boat, detectives Jack Christey and Alex St Clare track down the cause of the chopper's crash and ponder why the pilot has a bullet wound in his neck.
117	2	"Obsession"	29 February 2000
A torched yacht, two bodies, two men missing. Who is dead, who is alive and whodunnit?
118	3	"Pay the Piper"	7 March 2000
Christey's gun is stolen from his house. An ex-con is found, shot dead by a police revolver and Christey is set up as the prime suspect for murder.
119	4	"Charlie's Pride"	14 March 2000
A power struggle within Charlie Driscoll's crime empire makes Christey a marked man.
120	5	"Got A Light?"	21 March 2000
Alex's belief in the innocence of a serial arsonist leads her close to a fiery death.
121	6	"Play It Again (Part 1)"	28 March 2000
A former lover of Alex's becomes a suspect in a murder investigation and, after Helen Blakemore is forced to fire during an armed robbery, she finds her career on the line as Internal Affairs investigate.
122	7	"A Split Second (Part 2)"	28 March 2000
A former lover of Alex's becomes a suspect in a murder investigation and, after Helen Blakemore is forced to fire during an armed robbery, she finds her career on the line as Internal Affairs investigate
123	8	"Able to Leap Tall Buildings"	4 April 2000
The detectives are devastated when their scepticism about a woman's paranoid claims lead to a tragic killing
124	9	"Chinese Checkers"	11 April 2000
ASIO enlists a couple of the Water Rats in a covert operation which causes Reilly to become the victim of an amorous spy and Sykes' love life gets him into very hot water.
125	10	"The Trouble with Gary"	18 April 2000
Jack and Alex are lead round the mulberry bush by a smart alec killer while the ASIO operation comes back to haunt Sykes and Reilly.
126	11	"Saltimbocca"	2 May 2000
Detectives St Clare and Reilly investigate the murder of a restaurateur where their only witness is a ferocious dog.
127	12	"Jump in the Mouth"	9 May 2000
Alex and Mick must sift through a maze of suspects and motives to solve the murder of Cosimo Luvece.
128	13	"Pinchgut"	16 May 2000
Christey feels responsible when a grieving woman, whose brother is killed in an armed robbery, takes the law into her own hands and holds him and a suspect hostage.
129	14	"Mummy Dearest"	23 May 2000
Quinn and the Water Police are devastated when a young woman dies at the station; and, the detectives search for a kidnapped six-year-old girl.
130	15	"Two of a Kind"	30 May 2000
Reilly's life is on the line when he backs a streetkid suspected of murder.
131	16	"Lazarus"	6 June 2000
While recovering from a gunshot wound, Reilly finds his missing wheelchair occupied by a mummified body.
132	17	"Heavy Metal"	13 June 2000
Quinn's attraction to a young woman lands him in hot water during a murder investigation.
133	18	"Low Blows"	20 June 2000
Alex personal life throws her off balance leaving Christey and Reilly to solve the brutal slaying of a security guard.
134	19	"One Good Turn"	27 June 2000
What appears to be a simple mugging of a homeless woman, leads the Water Police into a confusing murder case and a threat on Alex's life.
135	20	"Mozzie"	4 July 2000
Alex undercover partner, and ex-lover comes back into her life after a series of death threats and she must take a hard look at the people she trusts.
136	21	"Tangled Web"	11 July 2000
A murder investigation leads Alex, Christey and Reilly to explore online relationships; and, Sykes dreams of becoming a detective. Guest Stars:'
137	22	"Reunion (Part 1)"	17 July 2000
A drug importing deal goes horribly wrong when a small time crim tries to implicate a notorious crime identity; and, a young woman appears claiming to be Christey's daughter.
138	23	"In the Blood (Part 2)"	24 July 2000
A drug importing deal goes horribly wrong when a small time crim tries to implicate a notorious crime identity; and, a young woman appears claiming to be Christey's daughter.
139	24	"Family Ties"	1 August 2000
Hawker becomes an unwitting accomplice to murder when he tries to help a friend; and, a young street kid becomes the prime suspect when his pregnant girlfriend is found murdered.
140	25	"Loose Ends"	8 August 2000
Two halves of a body don't add up for Reilly and Alex; and, Hawker discovers the reasons behind the murder of Aimee's father.
141	26	"Final Chapter"	15 August 2000
The Rats are caught off guard when they're ambushed on the harbour while transporting a wise-cracking prison inmate. When the getaway plans of the escapee and his girlfriend unravel, they take Christey and his daughter hostage.
142	27	"Silent Running"	22 August 2000
Distraught father and hard-nosed detective battle for supremacy when Jack Christey tracks his daughter after she's taken hostage by a prisoner on the run.
143	28	"With a Vengeance"	29 August 2000
When Constable Matthew Quinn takes the law into his own hands, he ends up in trouble with his girlfriend, local cops and Hawker; and, Christey, Alex and Reilly face quandary when they track a young woman on the run.
144	29	"We Could Be Heroes"	5 September 2000
When a retiring cop is bashed and tied naked to a wharf, Christey sets out on a mission to recover his dignity. Further investigation reveals the police officer's attacker is picking his victim's from the local newspaper; and, Reilly asks Alex out on a date.
145	30	"Remember This"	3 October 2000
When a young man is shot dead in a boatshed, Christey's overzealous actions causes the boatshed floor to collapse sending the body and any evidence into the harbour; and, when an ex-lover re-enters Reilly's life asking for his help, Christey accuses Alex of being jealous.
146	31	"Vigilante"	10 October 2000
When a known drug-dealer is murdered, a member of an anti-drug group is suspected. However, when Reilly's ex-lover confesses to the murder his faith is tested.
147	32	"Tribes"	17 October 2000
Alex confronts her prejudices when she thinks they have uncovered a ritual killing by a religious cult.
148	33	"The Last Hurrah"	24 October 2000
Jack is haunted by memories on the anniversary of Rachel's death. Coincidence forces him to hunt the woman many still hold responsible for Rachel's murder.
149	34	"Bye Bye Charlie"	31 October 2000
Charlie Driscoll, using a wheelchair, makes her last great dash for freedom and Jack Christey is determined to stop her. Last appearance of Scott Burgess as Snr Sgt Dave McCall
150	35	"Family Values"	7 November 2000
Convinced that a car accident was an attempt on her life, Alex investigates, only to discover a larger more frightening truth. Reilly and Christey come to blows over Alex.
151	36	"True Believer"	14 November 2000
Haunted by the brutal murder of a teenage girl, Alex puts her life on the line to identify the murderer; and Reilly wants to know where he stands with Alex.

=== Season 6 (2001) ===
No. overall	No. in series	Title	Original release date
152	1	"Domino"	6 February 2001
A water police operation on a container wharf results in a death, leaving each of the Rats to deal with their culpability and guilt.
153	2	"It Happened One Night"	13 February 2001
Christey's investigation into a series of yacht explosions takes him north to a beachside community, where he meets a beautiful female cop with an agenda of her own.
154	3	"High Roller"	20 March 2001
Jack Christey's new relationship is tested when one of the Rats is taken by a serial killer.
155	4	"Shadow Man"	27 March 2001
Though the serial killer has been caught, Christey supports Blakemore's claims that there is another killer out there, a shadow man targeting the police.
156	5	"Another Man's Poison"	6 March 2001
A runaway yacht, a missing child and suspected multiple murder set Alex and Christey down the wrong path with the surprising discovery of a plan to poison Sydney Harbour.
157	6	"Odds On"	13 March 2001
Jack Christey is reacquainted with his estranged father and discovers he's involved in a scam that could see the old man killed.
158	7	"Mates Rates"	20 March 2001
Quinn is forced to re-evaluate the meaning of friendship when he alienates his workmates, as he defends a friend's lies and criminal behaviour.
159	8	"The Hungry Bear Blues"	27 March 2001
Knowing that a great job is coming her way, Helen Blakemore resigns prematurely and takes the opportunity to tell everyone exactly what she thinks of them.
160	9	"The Thin Edge"	10 April 2001
Reilly crosses the line and unknowingly sparks a murder when he helps his sister's husband avoid jail.
161	10	"The Player"	17 April 2001
Reilly is forced to cover up the murder of a criminal to save his family.
162	11	"Broken English"	24 April 2001
Hawker remains the professional police officer, even when he is targeted by a criminal. But when the vendetta involves his son, Hawker shows his true colours.
163	12	"Line of Duty"	1 May 2001
Donna is taken hostage by a convicted killer. Alone, she is forced to rely on her wits and her training to save her life.
164	13	"True Blue Peter Gawler"	8 May 2001
The Rats attend a wake. As the alcohol flows, so do the stories and, one by one, their true feelings are revealed.
165	14	"Strike Out"	15 May 2001
Christey's daughter is given a brutal introduction to the realities of police work, while the death of a girl in a hit-and-run jet-ski accident causes disturbing memories to resurface for Alex.
166	15	"The Devil You Know"	22 May 2001
Alex's life is a nightmare as she battles an obsessed admirer, her mother and the flu.
167	16	"The Marrying Kind"	29 May 2001
On the eve of Gavin Sykes' wedding, the rest of the Rats admit to their true feelings - one is dumped, one is given an ultimatum and one is kissed.
168	17	"Bitter Legacy"	5 June 2001
Alex and Mick race against time when someone is distributing guns that are rigged to explode when fired.
169	18	"Robbo's Ghost"	12 June 2001
Things backfire for an old friend of Alex's when he begs her to find his missing son-in-law.
170	19	"Red Ice"	19 June 2001
After a shooting on a Harbour wharf, the Rats discover a love triangle of Russian immigrants and a Cold War in Sunny Sydney.
171	20	"Family Matters"	26 June 2001
A young, troubled boy places a wedge between Jack and his daughter, Sophie.
172	21	"Jackpot"	3 July 2001
Alex and Mick try to solve an old burglary and murder whilst battling a retired cop seeking redemption for years of humiliation.
173	22	"The Long Run"	10 July 2001
Alex and Mick chase a triple killer through the streets of Sydney.
174	23	"Bureaucracy Rules, OK?"	17 July 2001
Alex and Mick investigate the case of a four-year-old boy found at the bottom of the Harbour.
175	24	"The Removalist"	24 July 2001
The new boy at the Water Police, gorgeous George Newhouse is making waves with the woman, but Christey is not impressed.
176	25	"And the Winner Is..."	31 July 2001
Trying to prevent a full-scale turf war comes at a heavy price for the Rats.
177	26	"Cats and Pigeons"	7 August 2001
Jack Christey sets the cat amongst the pigeons, with devastating results.
