= G.P. =

Australian television series

- Book cover of text adaptation
- Created by: Sue Masters
- Starring: Michael Craig; John McTernan; Michael O'Neill; Sarah Chadwick; Denise Roberts; Brian Rooney; Judy McIntosh; Marilynne Paspaley; Tony Llewellyn-Jones; Damian Rice; Zoe Carides; Steve Bisley; Lenka Kripac; Melissa Jaffer; Leah Vandenberg
- Theme music composer: Simon Walker (Seasona 1–7); Mario Millo (Season 8)
- Composers: Simon Walker; Mark Isaacs; Chris Neal; Mario Millo
- Country of origin: Australia
- Original language: English
- No. of seasons: 8
- No. of episodes: 318

Production
- Executive producers: Matt Carroll; Penny Chapman
- Producers: Sue Masters; Bruce Best; Peter Andrikidis
- Cinematography: Ian Warburton; Paul Turner
- Editors: Scott Mantle; John Morris; David C. Jones; Darren Jonusas; Nicole La Macchia; Elizabeth Walshe
- Production companies: Australian Broadcasting Corporation; Roadshow Coote & Carroll (Seasons 1–7); Village Roadshow Pictures Television (Season 8)

Original release
- Network: ABC
- Release: 7 March 1989 – 10 December 1996

G.P. is an Australian television series broadcast by Australian Broadcasting Corporation, created by Sue Masters and produced by Roadshow, Coote and Carroll, the series aired for 8 seasons, spanning 318 episodes between 1989 and 1996.

== Synopsis ==
The series, screened on the ABC, is set around a fictional general medical practice, in the vein of the Seven Network serial A Country Practice. Whereas A Country Practice was set in a rural setting, G.P. was set at a clinic in an inner-Sydney suburb, and explored both the personal and professional lives of the general practitioners working together, and the other doctors and staff who worked there, as well as patients who attend the surgery.

== History and popularity ==
The series began on-air in March 1989, and while it initially failed to attract a major audience it went on to win numerous television awards (including the first Logie Award for an ABC-TV Drama in 15 years) and became the highest rating drama series on ABC-TV. G.P. ran for 8 seasons and a book about the series was written by producer Harvey Shore.

== Cast ==
=== Main ===
Actor	Role	Tenure
Michael Craig	Dr. William Sharp	Seasons 1–7
John McTernan	Dr. Robert Sharp	Seasons 1–4
Michael O'Neill	Dr. Steve Harrison	Seasons 1–5
Sarah Chadwick	Dr. Cathy Mitchell	Seasons 1–2
Denise Roberts	Julie Winters	Seasons 1–7
Brian Rooney	Michael Winters	Seasons 1–3 (main), Season 4 (recurring), Seasons 5 & 7 (guest)
Judy McIntosh	Dr. Nicola Tanner	Seasons 2–4
Marilynne Paspaley	Dr. Tessa Korkidas	Seasons 4–6
Tony Llewellyn-Jones	Dr. Ian Browning	Seasons 4–6 (main), Season 7 (guest)
Damian Rice	Dr. Martin Dempsey	Seasons 6–7
Zoe Carides	Dr. Sonia Kapek	Seasons 7–8
Steve Bisley	Dr. Henry King	Seasons 7–8
Lenka Kripac	Vesna Kapek	Season 7 (recurring), Season 8 (main)
Melissa Jaffer	Dr. Maureen Riordan	Season 8
Leah Vandenberg	Dr. Yasmin Richards	Season 8

=== Recurring ===
Actor	Role	Tenure
Peter Bryant	Dr. Chris Wright	Season 1
Theresa Wong	Su-Lin Chenn	Seasons 2–5
Dominic Elmaloglou	Peter Browning	Seasons 4–6
Janelle Owen	Zoe Browning	Seasons 4–6
Tracie Sammut	Donna Browning	Seasons 4–6
Sue Walker	Eva Fowler	Seasons 6–7
Penny Cook	Beth Paige	1991, 8 episodes
Peta Toppano	Anna Carrelli	1989, 10 episodes
Queenie Ashton	Mrs Jessica Sculthorpe	1991–1992, 6 episodes
John McTernan	Robert Sharp	1989–1992, Seasons 1–4
Sarah Chadwick	Dr. Cathy Mitchell	1989–1990x Seasons 1–2, 13 episodes

=== Character summary ===
G.P. features 2 major characters, who run the clinic:

Mr. William Sharp (Michael Craig) – In the beginning of the series Mr. Sharp is a part-time general surgeon with consulting rooms at the Ross St. Surgery owned by his nephew, Dr. Robert Sharp. As the series progressed he bought into the surgery with and started operating again at local public hospitals. William is characterised as a part of the 'old school' style of medicine. He can be quite forthcoming and stubborn in his opinions and is often at odds with his colleagues at the surgery. William served in World War II as a doctor and was a prisoner at the infamous Changi Prison. William drives a Jaguar and is very cultured with a great interest in and knowledge of music, poetry, food and wine.

Dr. Robert Sharp (John McTernan) – Originally the owner of Ross Street Surgery, Robert lives in the upstairs level of the house. The surgery was his father's and Robert took it over and raised his own family there. Robert is a widower and has a son Andrew, who makes numerous appearances in the first few series of the show. Uncle William lives with Robert and has his consulting rooms in the surgery. Like his Uncle William, Robert is very cultured but is often the more rational, liberal and socially minded of the pairing. Midway through the series, Robert develops a brain tumor. He is operated on to remove the tumor and survives, only to suffer a heart attack and die in recovery.

== Episodes ==
=== Season 1 (1989) ===
No. overall	No. in season	Title	Directed by	Written by	Original release date
1	1	"The Best Laid Plans"	Greg Shears	Greg Millin	7 March 1989
2	2	"Shaping Up"	Unknown	Unknown	14 March 1989
3	3	"Fade Out"	Unknown	Unknown	21 March 1989
4	4	"A Female Complaint"	Unknown	Unknown	28 March 1989
5	5	"Magic Bullets"	Unknown	Unknown	4 April 1989
6	6	"A Fair Advantage"	Unknown	Unknown	11 April 1989
7	7	"Second Chance"	Unknown	Unknown	18 April 1989
8	8	"For Better or Worse"	Unknown	Unknown	25 April 1989
9	9	"A Family Way"	Unknown	Unknown	2 May 1989
10	10	"They Just Wear You Down"	Unknown	Unknown	9 May 1989
11	11	"A Man's Place"	Unknown	Unknown	16 May 1989
12	12	"Heroes"	Unknown	Unknown	23 May 1989
13	13	"Lest We Remember"	Unknown	Unknown	30 May 1989
14	14	"Limbo"	Unknown	Unknown	6 June 1989
15	15	"Secrets"	Unknown	Unknown	13 June 1989
16	16	"The Best Policy"	Unknown	Unknown	20 June 1989
17	17	"Into the Valley"	Unknown	Unknown	27 June 1989
18	18	"Emile"	Unknown	Unknown	4 July 1989
19	19	"Growing Up"	Unknown	Unknown	18 July 1989
20	20	"Fat Cats"	Unknown	Unknown	25 July 1989
21	21	"Solar Strychnine"	Unknown	Unknown	1 August 1989
22	22	"Toss a Coin"	Unknown	Unknown	8 August 1989
23	23	"Daddy's Little Princess"	Unknown	Unknown	15 August 1989
24	24	"Dominant Male"	Unknown	Unknown	22 August 1989
25	25	"The Power of Love"	Unknown	Unknown	29 August 1989
26	26	"Chances"	Unknown	Unknown	5 September 1989
27	27	"Guilt Edges"	Unknown	Unknown	12 September 1989
28	28	"Chef's Special"	Unknown	Unknown	19 September 1989
29	29	"Heal Thyself"	Unknown	Unknown	26 September 1989
30	30	"Lies We Tell Ourselves"	Unknown	Unknown	3 October 1989
31	31	"Addicted to Love"	Unknown	Unknown	10 October 1989
32	32	"Choices"	Unknown	Unknown	17 October 1989
33	33	"Mother of the Year"	Unknown	Unknown	24 October 1989
34	34	"Simon Says"	Unknown	Unknown	31 October 1989
35	35	"The Poetry Man"	Unknown	Unknown	7 November 1989
36	36	"Blind Eye"	Unknown	Unknown	14 November 1989
37	37	"Nobody's Perfect"	Unknown	Unknown	21 November 1989
38	38	"Living with a Stranger"	Unknown	Unknown	28 November 1989

=== Season 2 (1990) ===
No. overall	No. in season	Title	Directed by	Written by	Original release date
39	1	"The Old Ball & Chain"	Unknown	Unknown	13 February 1990
40	2	"Everything Old is New Again"	Unknown	Unknown	20 February 1990
41	3	"Border of the Heart"	Unknown	Unknown	27 February 1990
42	4	"Ghosts"	Unknown	Unknown	6 March 1990
43	5	"The Evidence"	Unknown	Unknown	13 March 1990
44	6	"Confidences"	Unknown	Unknown	20 March 1990
45	7	"Rebel Rebel"	Unknown	Unknown	27 March 1990
46	8	"Mates"	Di Drew	Greg Millin	3 April 1990
47	9	"A Spoonful of Sugar"	Unknown	Unknown	10 April 1990
48	10	"Payback"	Unknown	Unknown	17 April 1990
49	11	"Will I Still Be Able to Do It"	Unknown	Unknown	24 April 1990
50	12	"Lovers"	Greg Shears	Greg Millin	1 May 1990
51	13	"A Neighbourly Gesture"	Unknown	Unknown	8 May 1990
52	14	"Freak Show"	Unknown	Unknown	15 May 1990
53	15	"Occupational Hazards"	Unknown	Unknown	22 May 1990
54	16	"A Difficult Stage"	Unknown	Unknown	29 May 1990
55	17	"Thicker Than Water"	Unknown	Unknown	5 June 1990
56	18	"Only Human"	Unknown	Unknown	12 June 1990
57	19	"And Baby Makes Three"	Unknown	Unknown	19 June 1990
58	20	"Another Day at the Office"	Unknown	Unknown	26 June 1990
59	21	"Practice Imperfect"	Unknown	Unknown	3 July 1990
60	22	"Smash"	Unknown	Unknown	10 July 1990
61	23	"Set Them Free"	Unknown	Unknown	17 July 1990
62	24	"A Very Long Goodbye"	Unknown	Unknown	24 July 1990
63	25	"Playing It by the Book"	Unknown	Unknown	31 July 1990
64	26	"The Moving Finger Writes"	Unknown	Unknown	7 August 1990
65	27	"George"	Unknown	Unknown	14 August 1990
66	28	"Illusions"	Unknown	Unknown	21 August 1990
67	29	"The Art of Compromise"	Unknown	Unknown	28 August 1990
68	30	"Why?"	Unknown	Unknown	4 September 1990
69	31	"A General Malaise"	Unknown	Unknown	11 September 1990
70	32	"Jobs for the Boys"	Unknown	Unknown	18 September 1990
71	33	"The Sleep of Reason"	Unknown	Unknown	25 September 1990
72	34	"Loose Ends"	Unknown	Unknown	2 October 1990
73	35	"Inside Out"	Unknown	Unknown	9 October 1990
74	36	"Crossover"	Unknown	Unknown	16 October 1990
75	37	"Longing"	Unknown	Unknown	23 October 1990
76	38	"Silent Majority"	Unknown	Unknown	30 October 1990
77	39	"For Richer, For Poorer"	Unknown	Unknown	6 November 1990
78	40	"Shadows"	Unknown	Unknown	13 November 1990

=== Season 3 (1991) ===
No. overall	No. in season	Title	Directed by	Written by	Original release date
79	1	"Just a Game"	Unknown	Unknown	12 February 1991
80	2	"So Makes the Man"	Kate Woods	Tim Pye	19 February 1991
81	3	"Hippocrates"	Unknown	Unknown	26 February 1991
82	4	"Visitors"	Unknown	Unknown	5 March 1991
83	5	"Out of Pasture"	Unknown	Unknown	12 March 1991
84	6	"Memories"	Unknown	Unknown	19 March 1991
85	7	"Testament/Say a Little Prayer"	Unknown	Unknown	26 March 1991
86	8	"Solomon's Choice"	Unknown	Unknown	2 April 1991
87	9	"Black & White/Sloan Street"	Unknown	Unknown	9 April 1991
88	10	"Love Hurts"	Unknown	Unknown	16 April 1991
89	11	"Binary"	Unknown	Unknown	23 April 1991
90	12	"The Heart of the Matter"	Unknown	Unknown	30 April 1991
91	13	"Three's a Crowd"	Unknown	Unknown	7 May 1991
92	14	"A Flock of Nightingales"	Unknown	Unknown	14 May 1991
93	15	"A Right to Write"	Unknown	Unknown	21 May 1991
94	16	"Unconventional Weapons"	Unknown	Unknown	28 May 1991
95	17	"Cutting Edge"	Unknown	Unknown	4 June 1991
96	18	"Darby & Joan"	Unknown	Unknown	11 June 1991
97	19	"Telling Tales"	Unknown	Unknown	18 June 1991
98	20	"Who Lives, Who Dies"	Unknown	Unknown	25 June 1991
99	21	"Rites of Passage"	Unknown	Michael Craig	2 July 1991
100	22	"Just a GP"	Unknown	Unknown	9 July 1991
101	23	"Nowhere to Run"	Julian Pringle	Anne Brooksbank	16 July 1991
102	24	"Once Bitten"	Unknown	Unknown	23 July 1991
103	25	"More Than Friends"	Unknown	Unknown	30 July 1991
104	26	"Family First"	Unknown	Unknown	6 August 1991
105	27	"The Price You Pay"	Unknown	Unknown	13 August 1991
106	28	"The View From Up Here"	Unknown	Unknown	20 August 1991
107	29	"My Brother's Keeper"	Unknown	Unknown	27 August 1991
108	30	"Unlived Lives"	Unknown	Unknown	3 September 1991
109	31	"Games People Pay"	Unknown	Unknown	10 September 1991
110	32	"Baggage"	Unknown	Unknown	17 September 1991
111	33	"A Weekend in the Country"	Unknown	Unknown	24 September 1991
112	34	"All in a Day's Work"	Unknown	Unknown	1 October 1991
113	35	"Collateral Damage"	Unknown	Unknown	8 October 1991
114	36	"On the Brink"	Unknown	Unknown	15 October 1991
115	37	"Quicksand"	Unknown	Unknown	22 October 1991
116	38	"Judgement Day"	Unknown	Unknown	29 October 1991
117	39	"Dark Lottery, Part 1"	Unknown	Unknown	5 November 1991
118	40	"Dark Lottery, Part 2"	Unknown	Unknown	12 November 1991

=== Season 4 (1992) ===
#	No.	Title	Original air date
119	1	"Test of Conscience"	11 February 1992
120	2	"We Regret of Advise There Will Be a Delay"	18 February 1992
121	3	"The Last Waltz"	25 February 1992
122	4	"Brave New World"	3 March 1992
123	5	"Time's Winged Chariot"	10 March 1992
124	6	"The Longest Day"	17 March 1992
125	7	"Under Control"	24 March 1992
126	8	"Hanging Out"	31 March 1992
127	9	"Modern Times"	7 April 1992
128	10	"A Very Suburban Coup"	14 April 1992
129	11	"Legacy"	21 April 1992
130	12	"Beating Around the Bush"	28 April 1992
131	13	"Beat It"	5 May 1992
132	14	"Rigor Mortis"	12 May 1992
133	15	"A Corner of Hell, Part 1"	19 May 1992
134	16	"A Corner of Hell, Part 2"	26 May 1992
135	17	"I'm All Right Jack"	2 June 1992
136	18	"The Killer Instinct"	9 June 1992
137	19	"Breaking Out"	16 June 1992
138	20	"The Olive Branch"	23 June 1992
139	21	"Shades of Grey"	30 June 1992
140	22	"Funny Business"	7 July 1992
141	23	"All Care Taken"	14 July 1992
142	24	"Crossroads"	21 July 1992
143	25	"Dial the Universe"	28 July 1992
144	26	"The Road Not Taken"	4 August 1992
145	27	"The Limits of Friendship"	11 August 1992
146	28	"Private Lives"	18 August 1992
147	29	"Pas de Trois"	25 August 1992
148	30	"A Question of Survival"	1 September 1992
149	31	"The Good & Faithful Servant"	8 September 1992
150	32	"Shaking Hands with Time"	15 September 1992
151	33	"Lies, Damned Lies & Statistics"	22 September 1992
152	34	"Three's Company"	29 September 1992
153	35	"Where Angels Fear to Tread"	6 October 1992
154	36	"Pogrom"	13 October 1992
155	37	"Chrysalis"	20 October 1992
156	38	"Strictly Confidential"	27 October 1992
157	39	"A Special Kind of Person, Part 1"	3 November 1992
158	40	"A Special Kind of Person, Part 2"	10 November 1992

=== Season 5 (1993) ===
#	No.	Title	Original air date
159	1	"Light a Special Candle"	23 February 1993
160	2	"Pioneers"	2 March 1993
161	3	"One Perfect Day"	9 March 1993
162	4	"All Under Control"	16 March 1993
163	5	"Dancing With Death"	23 March 1993
164	6	"A Thousand Flowers, Part 1"	30 March 1993
165	7	"A Thousand Flowers, Part 2"	30 March 1993
166	8	"Blood Lines"	6 April 1993
167	9	"Venus Within"	13 April 1993
168	10	"Get a Life"	20 April 1993
Written by: Matt Ford; Directed by: Paul Faint
169	11	"Balancing Act"	27 April 1993
170	12	"A Stroll in the Park"	4 May 1993
171	13	"A Minor Complaint"	11 May 1993
172	14	"Targets"	18 May 1993
173	15	"An Uplifting Experience"	25 May 1993
174	16	"Knights of the Netherworld"	1 June 1993
175	17	"Death Has a Way With Her"	8 June 1993
176	18	"Alone, Part 1"	15 June 1993
177	19	"Alone, Part 2"	22 June 1993
178	20	"Exposed"	29 June 1993
179	21	"Drowning Not Waving"	6 July 1993
180	22	"The Sentimental Bloke"	13 July 1993
181	23	"Snakes & Ladders"	20 July 1993
182	24	"Close to Her Chest"	27 July 1993
183	25	"Family Life"	3 August 1993
184	26	"Close Encounters"	10 August 1993
185	27	"Infected"	17 August 1993
186	28	"Square Pegs"	24 August 1993
187	29	"Living With the Past"	31 August 1993
188	30	"Fugue in a Minor Key"	7 September 1993
189	31	"Uncharted Waters"	14 September 1993
190	32	"The Method"	21 September 1993
191	33	"No Time for Games"	28 September 1993
192	34	"Releasing the Spirit"	5 October 1993
193	35	"All in the Eyes"	12 October 1993
194	36	"Borderline"	19 October 1993
195	37	"The Long Weekend"	26 October 1993
196	38	"A Family Affair"	2 November 1993
197	39	"A Long Day's Journey"	9 November 1993
198	40	"Loose Ends"	16 November 1993

=== Season 6 (1994) ===
#	No.	Title	Original air date
199	1	"Special Places, Part 1"	15 February 1994
200	2	"Special Places, Part 2"	15 February 1994
201	3	"More out of Life"	22 February 1994
202	4	"Scared to Death"	1 March 1994
203	5	"Brotherly Love"	8 March 1994
204	6	"Out"	15 March 1994
Written by: Chris McCourt; Directed by: David Goldie
205	7	"Coitus Interruptus"	22 March 1994
206	8	"Innocent Bystander"	29 March 1994
207	9	"Something Old, Something New"	5 April 1994
208	10	"The Sorcerer's Apprentice"	12 April 1994
Written by: Noel Hodda; Directed by: Tony Tilse
209	11	"The Team Player"	19 April 1994
210	12	"Sugar and Spice"	26 April 1994
Written by: Deborah Parsons; Directed by: David Evans
211	13	"Double Bind"	3 May 1994
212	14	"A Temporary Mess"	10 May 1994
213	15	"Breaking Out"	17 May 1994
214	16	"The Drover's Wife"	24 May 1994
215	17	"Home & Contents"	31 May 1994
216	18	"E"	7 June 1994
217	19	"Making Mischief"	14 June 1994
218	20	"Alex & Rose"	21 June 1994
219	21	"Solo"	28 June 1994
220	22	"The Chicken Run"	5 July 1994
221	23	"Ties of the Blood"	12 July 1994
222	24	"In Good Hands"	19 July 1994
223	25	"Fatherly Duties"	26 July 1994
224	26	"That Old Black Magic"	2 August 1994
225	27	"Natural Selection"	9 August 1994
226	28	"A Hard Act to Follow"	16 August 1994
227	29	"Captive Heart"	23 August 1994
228	30	"Grin & Bare It"	30 August 1994
229	31	"Footprints"	6 September 1994
230	32	"Breakfast With Gazza"	13 September 1994
231	33	"All of Me"	20 September 1994
232	34	"Desperate Measures"	27 September 1994
233	35	"Revelations"	4 October 1994
234	36	"State of Grace"	11 October 1994
235	37	"Back Streets"	18 October 1994
236	38	"Rarely Pure & Never Smile"	25 October 1994
237	39	"Odyssey, Part 1"	1 November 1994
238	40	"Odyssey, Part 2"	8 November 1994

=== Season 7 (1995) ===
#	No.	Title	Original air date
239	1	"Bandaids"	21 February 1995
240	2	"Grown Ups"	28 February 1995
241	3	"The Tiniest Fraction"	7 March 1995
242	4	"Filial Contract"	14 March 1995
243	5	"I Grow Old, I Grow Old"	21 March 1995
244	6	"In Control"	28 March 1995
245	7	"After Hours"	4 April 1995
246	8	"What About Your Heart?"	11 April 1995
247	9	"An Arm & a Leg"	18 April 1995
248	10	"The Carrot & the Stick"	25 April 1995
249	11	"Still Life"	2 May 1995
250	12	"Hide & Seek"	9 May 1995
251	13	"Relative Strangers"	16 May 1995
252	14	"Lady Be Good"	23 May 1995
253	15	"This Year, Next Year"	30 May 1995
254	16	"Don't Count Your Chickens"	6 June 1995
255	17	"Falling Backwards"	13 June 1995
256	18	"A Great Bunch of Blokes"	20 June 1995
257	19	"Not Fade Away"	27 June 1995
Written by: Steven Vidler; Directed by: Greg Shears and Peter Andrikidis
258	20	"A Parting of Friends"	4 July 1995
Written by: John Coulter; Directed by: Paul Faint
259	21	"Keeping Up with Yesterday"	11 July 1995
260	22	"Baby Sitter"	18 July 1995
261	23	"You Say Potato"	25 July 1995
262	24	"Private Faces, Public Places"	1 August 1995
263	25	"Like Father, Like Son"	8 August 1995
264	26	"The Promise of Tomorrow"	22 August 1995
265	27	"Stand by Your Man"	29 August 1995
266	28	"Manoeuvres"	5 September 1995
267	29	"Trapped"	12 September 1995
268	30	"Those Who Can't"	19 September 1995
269	31	"Oh My Papa"	26 September 1995
270	32	"Imperfect Science"	3 October 1995
271	33	"One for the Road"	10 October 1995
272	34	"Forgive & Forget"	17 October 1995
273	35	"So Like a Woman"	24 October 1995
274	36	"Rhythm & Blues"	31 October 1995
275	37	"Hush Little Baby"	7 November 1995
276	38	"Sunday Bloody Sunday"	14 November 1995
277	39	"Comic Relief"	21 November 1995
Written by: Chris Hawkshaw; Directed by: Marcus North
278	40	"With a Beard on His Shoulder"	28 November 1995

=== Season 8 (1996) ===
#	No.	Title	Original air date
279	1	"Where the Heart Is"	5 March 1996
280	2	"Hardwired"	12 March 1996
281	3	"A Man of Action"	19 March 1996
282	4	"Two to Tango"	26 March 1996
283	5	"Brain Storm"	2 April 1996
284	6	"Someone to Turn To"	9 April 1996
285	7	"New Confusions"	16 April 1996
286	8	"The Ceremony of Innocence"	23 April 1996
287	9	"Ding Dong Bell"	30 April 1996
288	10	"In Sickness and in Health"	7 May 1996
289	11	"Fire and Water"	14 May 1996
290	12	"Will You Still Love Me Tomorrow? – Part 1"	21 May 1996
291	13	"Will You Still Love Me Tomorrow? – Part 2"	21 May 1996
292	14	"Smoke"	28 May 1996
293	15	"Never Judge a Book"	4 June 1996
294	16	"A Stiff Upper Lip"	11 June 1996
295	17	"Sleeping Beauty"	18 May 1996
296	18	"Not Breathing, Choking"	25 June 1996
297	19	"Juice"	2 July 1996
298	20	"Blind Friday"	9 July 1996
299	21	"Long Time Coming"	16 July 1996
300	22	"Sing Me a Lullaby"	23 July 1996
301	23	"Drowning by Numbers"	30 July 1996
302	24	"The Pleasure of Your Company"	6 August 1996
303	25	"The Waiter"	13 August 1996
304	26	"Vision"	27 August 1996
305	27	"Go Directly to Jail"	3 September 1996
306	28	"Whatever Turns You On"	10 September 1996
307	29	"Handle With Care"	17 September 1996
308	30	"Twinkle, Twinkle, Little Star"	24 September 1996
309	31	"I Kiss Your Dirty Shoe"	1 October 1996
310	32	"Critical Distances"	8 October 1996
311	33	"Pendulum"	15 October 1996
312	34	"If I Were a Carpenter"	22 October 1996
313	35	"Show and Tell"	5 November 1996
314	36	"Apron Strings"	12 November 1996
315	37	"Superman"	19 November 1996
316	38	"Shoot the Messenger"	26 November 1996
317	39	"Ghosts in the Machine"	3 December 1996
318	40	"This Terrible Business"	10 December 1996

== International broadcasts ==
G.P. has been shown in Canada on CBC Country Canada, a digital television station; and in New Zealand (on TV One and TV3), Jordan (on Channel 2), South Africa (Bop TV), Hong Kong (ATV World) and Ireland (on RTE1). In 2008 and 2009, ABC1 re-broadcast Series 3 onwards at 4:30am on weekdays.

In the UK, Central Independent Television, Thames Television and Border Television were the only contractors among the 14 members of the ITV Network to screen the programme for a short period. Thames started the show on Thursday 1 October 1992, screening on Thursdays and Fridays for half-hour episodes at 3.20pm until the end of the year. Central axed the show on Thursday 25 March 1993 and replaced it with Shortland Street. The programme was shown in a daily 3.20pm slot Tuesdays to Fridays and had the hour-long episodes split into two to accommodate the half-hour slot. This was a popular format for screening acquired Australian material as had been used with A Country Practice, E Street, Blue Heelers and HeadLand by UK broadcasters.

In 1994, the UK version of The Family Channel aired the series as half-hour editions during the week at 20:30–21:00 on Wednesday and Friday with the episode repeated as an hour long episode on Saturdays at 19:30.

== Awards and nominations ==
=== Australian Film Institute Awards ===
Year	Nominee	Award	Result	Ref
1993	Bruce Best (for "Exposed")	Best Episode in a Television Drama Series	Nominated	
1993	Peter Phelps (for "Exposed")	Best Performance by an Actor in a Leading Role in a Television Drama	Won	
1993	Denise Roberts (for "Alone")	Best Performance by an Actress in a Leading Role in a Television Drama	Won	
1994	Peter Andrikidis (for "Double Bind")	Best Episode in a Television Drama Series	Nominated	
1994	Peter Kowitz (for "Innocent Bystander")	Best Performance by an Actor in a Leading Role in a Television Drama	Nominated	
1994	Sigrid Thornton (for "Double Bind")	Best Performance by an Actress in a Leading Role in a Television Drama	Nominated	
1994	Kristen Dunphy (for "Double Bind")	Best Screenplay in a Television Drama	Nominated	
1996	Peter Andrikidis (for "Ceremony of Innocence")	Complete Post Award for Best Episode in a Television Drama Series	Nominated	
1996	Peter Andrikidis (for "Sing Me a Lullaby")	Complete Post Award for Best Episode in a Television Drama Series	Nominated	
1996	Peter Andrikidis (for "Sing Me a Lullaby")	First Australian Completion Bond Award for Best Achievement in Direction in a Television Drama	Nominated	
1996	Marton Csokas (for "Ceremony of Innocence")	Village Roadshow Award for Best Performance by an Actor in a Leading Role in a Television Drama	Nominated	
1996	Claudia Karvan (for "Sing Me a Lullaby")	Beyond Television Award for Best Performance by an Actress in a Leading Role in a Television Drama	Won	
1996	Katherine Thomson (for "Ceremony of Innocence")	Crowley Management Award for Best Screenplay in a Television Drama	Nominated	

=== Australian Writers' Guild ===
Year	Nominee	Award	Result	Ref
1991	Keith Thompson for "A General Malaise"	Major AWGIE Award	Won	
1991	Keith Thompson for "A General Malaise"	TV series	Won	
1993	Katherine Thomson for "Shaking Hands with Time"	TV series	Won	
1994	Michael Miller for "Exposed"	TV series	Won	
1996	Tim Pye for "Where The Heart Is"	TV series	Won	

=== Human Rights and Equal Opportunity Commission ===
Year	Nominee	Award	Result	Ref
1992	Bruce Best	TV Drama Award	Won	

=== Logie Awards ===
Year	Nominee	Award	Result	Ref
1991	Michael Craig	Most Outstanding Actor	Won	
1992	John McTernan	Most Outstanding Actor	Won	
1992	G.P.	Most Outstanding Series	Won	
1993	Tracie Sammut	Special Recognition Award	Won	
