= Alan Cinis =

Australian politician and actor

Leichhardt City Council
- Incumbent
- Assumed office 2008

Personal details
- Born: 10 August 1960 (age 66) Orange, New South Wales, Australia
- Party: New South Wales Greens

Alan Cinis (born 10 August 1960 in Orange, New South Wales), an Australian politician and actor, has served as a Councillor on Leichhardt Council, Sydney, New South Wales, representing the NSW Greens since 2008. As an actor, Cinis has starred in television, musical drama and film.

== Acting career ==
Cinis commenced his acting career in October 1969, aged nine. His television, film and musical drama credits are extensive, from The Castaways (TV series) in 1974 to Underbelly: The Golden Mile (TV series) in 2010. He also appeared in Heartbreak High (TV series) in 1997.

Cinis has also appeared in numerous television commercials.

== Filmography ==
=== Film ===
- The Devil's Playground (1976) as Waite
- Silver City (1984) as Charlie
- Dark City (1998) as Automat Cop
- The Dark Redemption (1999) as General Towa & voice of Darth Vader
- Peter Pan (2003) as Skylights
- Oyster Farmer (2004) as Slug

=== Television ===
- The Castaways (1974) as David
- Chopper Squad
- Glenview High (1977-79)
- Heartbreak High (1997)
- Wildside (1998, Season 1)
- Misery Guts (1998-99) Vincent "Vin" Shipley
- Graas Roots (2000-03) as Justin Thyer
- Young Lions (2002) as Phil Emerson
- Home and Away (2002-03) as Ralph Patterson
- Underbelly: The Golden Mile (2010) as Andy Little

== Political career ==
In 2008, Cinis was elected to Leichhardt Council at the NSW local government elections representing the Eora Leichhardt Lilyfield Ward. As a long-term resident and a veteran of the Australian acting scene, Cinis was appearing in the Australian production of Billy Elliot the Musical at the Capitol Theatre, Sydney at the time of his election to Council. He campaigned on a strong anti-crime platform, claiming: "I’ve been a victim of crime – my wife has been shot at, I’ve been bashed in the street and pinned down by local troublemakers. Now I can do my bit to ask the right questions and improve safety..... I’m keen to work with underprivileged kids from wrong side of the tracks, to get in there and make a difference."

=== Controversy ===
On 9 November 2010, it was reported that Cinis was arrested after police allegedly seized 12 plastic bags containing "green vegetable matter" and six plants from his Leichhardt home. He was charged with deemed supply, possession and cultivation offences relating to cannabis and possessing a prohibited drug. Cinis was released on bail and was scheduled to appear before Balmain local court in December 2010. On 8 June 2011 Cinis pleaded guilty to cultivation and possession and was placed on an 18-month good behaviour bond. The deemed supply charge was withdrawn.
