= The Dark Redemption =

- Directed by: Peter Mether
- Written by: Peter Mether Dwight Bonecki Derek Curtis
- Based on: Star Wars expanded universe by George Lucas
- Produced by: Warren Duxbury; Peter Mether
- Starring: Martin Grelis; Leah McLeod; David Wheeler
- Cinematography: Mark Seton Chapman; Tom Gleeson; Roger Grant; Andrew Oliver; Paul Pandoulis
- Edited by: Roger Grant; John Hresc; Craig Sue; Peter Worland
- Music by: William Bawden; Craig Sue
- Distributed by: TheForce.Net
- Release date: 5 March 1999 (Australia)
- Running time: 25 minutes
- Country: Australia
- Language: English
- Budget: $30,000

The Dark Redemption is a 1999 Australian Star Wars fanfilm featuring Mara Jade, a character featured in Star Wars books and comics. Peter Sumner returns to the role of Imperial Officer Lt. Pol Treidum, whom he played in Star Wars.

An attempt was made to submit the film to an official fan film contest in 2003 that was sanctioned by George Lucas; however, the short was not considered to be eligible as it was set prior to the events of Episode IV: A New Hope, which violated the contest's rules by adding new content to the series, which Lucas also considered to be a copyright violation. The film was briefly removed from the Internet at Lucas' request.

== Synopsis ==
Set just before the events of the original Star Wars, the film tells of how Mara Jade (a character from the Star Wars expanded universe) worked with other Rebels to capture the plans for the first Death Star. While on the mission, though, Mara hears the Emperor's call to turn to the dark side of the Force.

Other crucial moments in Star Wars history are explained in this film, such as how Han Solo got in trouble with Jabba the Hutt.

== Cast ==
- Damian Rice ... Zev Senesca
- Jason Chong ... Klaus Vanderon
- Michelle Ellard ... Hah'Shyyk Baba
- Martin Grelis ... Boba Fett
- Leah McLeod ... Mara Jade
- Peter Sumner ... Lieutenant Pol Treidum
- David Wheeler ... Cmdr. Garrock
- Drew Sneddon ... Darth Sidious
- William Bowden ... Voice of Darth Sidious and Cantina Alien
- Nathan Harvey ... Kyle Katarn
- Uncredited voice actor ... Han Solo
- Ben Craig ... Darth Vader
- Alan Cinis ... General Towa and Voice of Darth Vader
- John Griffiths ... Admiral Melaan
- Robert McDougal ... Captain McDougal and Imperial Officer
- Andrew Gibson ... Rebel Officer
- Maynard ... Lieutenant Arras
- Jake Downs ... Lieutenant Drovas
- David Lucas ... Lieutenant Raltar
- Will Usic ... Lieutenant Valle
- David Edwards ... Lieutenant Tighe
- Yul Kannan ... Zelig, Kessel Slave Miner, and voice of Cantina Alien
- Tabitha ... Bitha Tah'
- Jabba ... Ramsa Lenam
- Daniel Budd ... Royal Guard, Stormtrooper, and Imperial Officer

== Production ==
Warren Duxbury and Dwight Boniecki worked on a script for The Dark Redemption for eight months before approaching Mether to help them make the film. It was considered an ambitious fanfilm at the time, with 72 scenes and 20 CGI sequences. A team of 20 3D artists worked on the short. At the time of filming, Mether was a director-producer at Foxtel, and many Foxtel presenters acted in the film.

== Reception ==
The film was screened twice at the Noosa Film Festival.
