= Fire (TV series) =

- Genre: Drama
- Created by: Michael Caulfield; Tony Cavanaugh; Simone North
- Starring: Georgie Parker; Peter Phelps; Aaron C. Jeffery; Shane Connor; Max Phipps; Andy Anderson; Wayne Pygram; Tayler Kane; Liddy Clark; Deborra-Lee Furness; Jake Brady-Scarff; Beau Bailey; Curt McLachlan; Raul Vera
- Composer: Roger Mason
- Country of origin: Australia
- Original language: English
- No. of seasons: 2
- No. of episodes: 26

Production
- Executive producers: Mikael Borglund; Des Monaghan; John Holmes
- Running time: 50 minutes
- Production company: Beyond Productions

Original release
- Network: Seven Network
- Release: 14 February 1995 – 9 May 1996

Fire is an Australian television series transmitted on the Seven Network between 1995 and 1996. It was shown in the UK and Ireland on Sky One. In 1999 and 2000, the series was shown on Channel 5.

The series explored the lives of a platoon of firefighters. The leading cast members included: Andy Anderson, Georgie Parker, Peter Phelps, Shane Connor, Deborra-Lee Furness, Danny Adcock, Wayne Pygram, Liddy Clark, Aaron Jeffery, Tayler Kane and Max Phipps.

== Cast ==
=== Season one ===
- Georgie Parker as Firefighter 4th grade Morgan 'Mad Dog'Cartwright
- Peter Phelps as Station Officer Nick 'The Boss' Connor
- Wayne Pygram as Senior Station Officer Quentin 'Spit' Jacobsen
- Andy Anderson as Firefighter 1st grade John 'Repo' Kennedy
- Tayler Kane as Firefighter 1st/3rd grade Louis 'Grievous' Fazio
- Shane Feeney-Connor as Firefighter 1st grade David 'Giraffe' Simpson
- Aaron Jeffery as Firefighter 1st grade Richard 'Banjo' Gates
- Max Phipps as Senior Firefighter Edward 'Dinosaur' Spence

=== Season two ===
- Wayne Pygram as Senior Station Officer Quentin 'Spit' Jacobsen
- Damian Pike as Firefighter/Station Officer Montgomery 'Seldom' Webber
- Andy Anderson as Station Officer John 'Repo' Kennedy
- Tayler Kane as Firefighter Louis 'Grievous' Fazio
- Danny Adcock as Firefighter Danny 'Nugget' Hunt
- Tottie Goldsmith as Firefighter Marilyn 'Tex' Perez
- Fiona MacGregor Firefighter Greta 'Garbo' Fazio
- Robert Morgan as Firefighter Peter 'TNT' Thompson
- Damian Rice as Firefighter Martin 'Mary' Hawthorne

=== Recurring ===
- Deborra-Lee Furness as Dolores Kennedy
- Liddy Clark as Detective Sergeant Jean Diamond
- Jack Heywood as Det. Sen. Sgt. Ron Chandler
- Andrew McKaige as Det. Henri Aldridge
- Arron Wayne Cull as Det. Vlad Hadzic
- Norman Steiner as Al
- Sean Scully as Dr. David Crown
- Daniel 'Danny' Roberts as Ted Cartwright
- Anne Tenney as Anne Risdale
- Geneviève Picot as Sophie Harrison
- Kim Gyngell as Jimmy Runyon
- Angela Punch McGregor as Dr. Pru Eberhardt

== Synopsis ==
=== Season 1 ===
The series starts with new female recruit Morgan Cartwright (Georgie Parker) joining the ranks of South East Fire station in Brisbane. Morgan has to face prejudices in the male dominated profession, mainly from the icy platoon sergeant 'Spit' (Wayne Pygram). Other characters include The Boss (Peter Phelps), Grievous (Tayler Kane), Banjo (Aaron Jeffrey), Dinosaur (Max Phipps), Repo (Andy Anderson) and Giraffe (Shane Feeney-Connor).

The local arson squad also play a very prominent part from the beginning of season 1. Detective Sergeant Jean Diamond (Liddy Clark) has been investigating a series of fires for over a year, which she believes to actually be the work of a firefighter. Knowing that Morgan has just joined South East, Jean approaches Morgan and puts her theory to her. She asks that Morgan will be her "eyes and ears" in the fire station. This makes life complicated for Morgan.

Ultimately, Detective Diamond's theory is proved correct. It is revealed that one of the firefighters from South East has been lighting fires.

Season 1 was made with the cooperation of the Queensland Fire Service and their appliances were used during filming as well as their logos. The two main appliances used at South East were an International ACCO Teleboom and a Firepac appliance.

=== Season 2 ===
Season 2 was centred on a different fire station. However, three fire fighters from the original series, Repo, Grievous and Spit, were retained and joined by new characters at West End fire station. After the death of Repo's father, he decides to apply for the rank of Station Officer at West End. He gains the promotion, much to the disgust of Spit, the Senior Station Officer. After some events that take place at fire scenes, Repo decides that he would be happier just being a firefighter. He steps down from the position of Station Officer and this vacancy is taken by Seldom (Damian Pike), who has recently passed his tests.

Meanwhile, Tex (Tottie Goldsmith) finds out that she is pregnant and is confused as to what to do. She talks to Repo's wife, Dolores (Deborra-Lee Furness) and her doctor and decides to terminate.

The station is a mix of various characters. Grievous (Tayler Kane) is the womaniser who loves to fight fires and finds out that he has a son from the turkey baster incident in season 1. Nugget (Danny Adcock) is the veteran who just likes to get on with the job. Mary (Damian Rice), the Army wannabe loves regiment and discipline and looks up to Spit. TNT (Robert Morgan) is the union rep at the station who seems to always look on the negative side of everything (hence the nickname 'Totally Negative Tommo').

Seldom gets himself into disciplinary trouble with Spit, when his vendetta against Jimmy Runyon (Kym Gyngell) becomes far more than job related. After TNT makes some disparaging remarks towards the Commissioner, he finds himself transferred to the bush. His replacement is Greta Fazio (Fiona MacGregor) who just happens to be Grievous' cousin. She is a bit of a daredevil (earning herself the nickname 'Garbo') and takes a little while to settle in. She becomes involved in a sexual harassment case with Nugget, which ultimately ends in tragedy.

Season 2 was made without the support of the Queensland Fire Service. The made-up name of Queensland Fire Brigade was used during this season with a different logo. Appliances used were purchased/loaned to make the show. The two main appliances used at West End were an International ACCO Pumper and a RFW Wormald Simon Snorkel appliance. The withdrawal of support by the Queensland Fire Service was the result of concerns raised by the United Firefighters Union and Fire Service management about the way firefighters and the fire service were portrayed in the first season.

Unlike season 1, which featured 13 episodes, season 2 only had six episodes, although episode 5, "Vendetta", was divided into five parts, and episode 6, "War of the Worlds", into four, giving the season a total of 13 separate 'episodes'.

== List of episodes ==
Episode information retrieved from Australian Television archive.

=== Season 1 (1995) ===
No. overall	No. in series	Title	Directed by	Written by	Original release date
1	1	"The Curse"	Peter Fisk	Tony Cavanaugh	14 February 1995
2	2	"United We Stand"	Megan Simpson	Tony Cavanaugh	21 February 1995
3	3	"Doppelganger"	Gary Conway	Tony Cavanaugh	28 February 1995
4	4	"The Rip Off"	Peter Fisk	Tony Cavanaugh	7 March 1995
5	5	"The Bushfire"	Megan Simpson-Huberman	Deborah Cox	14 March 1995
6	6	"Hellfire"	Peter Fisk	Tony Cavanaugh & Deborah Cox	21 March 1995
7	7	"Crazy Horse"	Geoffrey Bennett	Deborah Cox	28 March 1995
8	8	"Galileo and Da Vinci"	Megan Simpson	Tony Cavanaugh	4 April 1995
9	9	"Evening Star"	Catherine Millar	Tony Cavanaugh & Deborah Cox	11 April 1995
10	10	"Sanctums"	Peter Fisk	Everett de Roche	18 April 1995
11	11	"Glory Days"	Donald Crombie	Everett de Roche	25 April 1995
12	12	"The Father of Paradox"	Peter Fisk	Everett de Roche	2 May 1995
13	13	"Shadows"	Peter Fisk	Everett de Roche & Tony Cavanaugh	9 May 1995

=== Season 2 (1996) ===
No. overall	No. in series	Title	Directed by	Written by	Original release date
14	1	"Down the Barrel"	Peter Fisk	Tony Cavanaugh & Peter Schreck	14 February 1996
15	2	"The Accident"	Geoffrey Bennett	Tony Cavanaugh	21 February 1996
16	3	"The Responsibility"	Ross McGregor	Tony Cavanaugh	28 February 1996
17	4	"The Big Bang"	Peter Fisk	Tony Cavanaugh	7 March 1996
18	5	"Vendetta (I)"	Geoffrey Nottage	Tony Cavanaugh	14 March 1996
19	6	"Vendetta (II)"	Ross McGregor	Tony Cavanaugh & Graham Hartley	21 March 1996
20	7	"Vendetta (III)"	Peter Fisk	Tony Cavanaugh	28 March 1996
21	8	"Vendetta (IV)"	Geoffrey Bennett	Graham Hartley	4 April 1996
22	9	"Vendetta (V)"	Ross McGregor	Graham Hartley	11 April 1996
23	10	"War of the Worlds (I) - Who's Afraid of Greta Garbo?"	Peter Fisk	Everett de Roche	18 April 1996
24	11	"War of the Worlds (II) - Fools Paradise"	Geoffrey Nottage	Everett de Roche	25 April 1996
25	12	"War of the Worlds (III)"	Ross McGregor	Everett de Roche	2 May 1996
26	13	"War of the Worlds (IV)"	Peter Fisk	Everett de Roche	9 May 1996

== Home media ==
Both Season 1 and 2 were released on DVD as separate boxed sets by Beyond DVD/Force Entertainment in Australia.

DVD name	Format	Ep #	Discs	Region 4 (Australia)	Special features	Distributors
Season one	DVD	13		18 April 2007	None	
Season two	DVD	13			None	
Fire (The Complete Collection)	DVD	26	8	4 September 2013	None	Beyond Home Entertainment
Fire (The Complete Collection) (Repackaged)	DVD	26	8	20 April 2016	None	Beyond Home Entertainment
Fire (The Complete Series)	DVD	26	8	5 May 2021	None	Via Vision Entertainment
