= Temptation (2003 film) =

Temptation was an Australian telemovie which screened on Network Ten in 2003, starring Colin Friels as Roberto Francobelli. It was a co-production with subscription television and screened on the UKTV channel on Foxtel. It was produced by Penny Chapman and Sue Masters and it was directed by Tony Tilse.

The theme was passion for cooking and love. Chefs Ruth and Gabe are the top students of their graduating year and have fallen in love, but it's love and war involving the staff of the two restaurants in the same street when Gabe starts working at his father's and Ruth open's a restaurant across the road with his ex-partner

Temptation led to a spin-off television drama series that ran for one season on Network Ten in 2004 called The Cooks.

== Locations ==
Most of the exterior scenes were filmed around the Inner West areas of Sydney. The restaurants were located in the suburb of Summer Hill.

== Cast ==
- Colin Friels as Roberto Francobelli
- Toby Schmitz as Gabe Francobelli
- Kate Atkinson as Ruth O'Neill
- Nicholas Brown as Sachin
- Rhondda Findleton as Rita Molloy
- Emma Lung as Carmelita
- Jacqueline Brennan as Cathy O'Neill
- Damian Rice as TAFE Teacher
- Alan David Lee as Mark
- Essie Davis as Julie
