= Damian Rice =

Australian actor (born 1961)

- Born: Damian Rice; 1961 (age 64–65); Australia
- Occupation: Actor
- Years active: 1994–2014

Damian Rice (born 1961) is an Australian actor who has appeared in various Australian drama series, including G.P., Fire, All Saints and Blue Heelers.

== Filmography ==
=== Television ===
Year	Film	Role	Type
1994-95	G.P.	Dr Martin Dempsey	TV series, 45 episodes
1996	Fire	Firefighter Martin 'Mary' Hawthorne	TV series, 13 episodes
1998	Blue Heelers	Brendan Nash	TV series, 2 episodes
1998	Water Rats	Patrick Caruana	TV series, 1 episode
1999-2001	All Saints	Nick Adams / Lindsay Farlow	TV series, 6 episodes
2001	Above the Law	Detective Sgt Nick Young	TV series, 1 episode
2008	Out of the Blue	Dr Supple	TV series, 3 episodes
2004-11	Home and Away	Shawn Maroney / Mr De Groot	TV series, 3 episodes
2013	Power Games: The Packer-Murdoch War	Ken May	Miniseries, 1 episode
2014	Love Child	Gus	TV series, 1 episode

=== Film ===
Year	Film	Role	Type
1999	The Dark Redemption	Zev Senesca	Short fan-film
1999	The New Girlfriend aka Envy	Couple	
2003	Temptation	TAFE Teacher	TV movie
2009	Rogue Nation	Private Joseph Sudds	TV movie

== Discography ==
Year	Song	Notes
2012	Please Explain	A Perfect Plan / Fly Me to the Moon soundtrack
