= Marilynne Paspaley =

Australian actor

Marilynne Paspaley AM is an Australian film and television actress and businesswoman of Greek descent, who is best known for her role in the television series G. P. as Dr. Tessa Korkidas. She appeared in the movie Evil Angels (A Cry in the Dark) and other television series such as Water Rats.

== Background ==
Paspaley has been referred to as "daughter of Australia's most famous pearling dynasty", as she is a second generation member of the Paspaley family, well known in Australia as the largest producer of South Sea Pearls.

== Order of Australia ==
In 2008, Marilynne Paspaley was honoured with an Order of Australia, for her contribution to the marketing and promotion of pearls and Australian designed jewellery.

== Family ==
Paspaley is the daughter of Nicholas Paspaley Senior, Master Pearler and founder of the Paspaley Pearls empire. The business is now owned by the founders children being; her brother Nicholas Paspaley, her sister Roslynne Bracher and herself. Marilynne Paspaley also owns and operates business interests in hospitality in the North West of Australia, under the umbrella name of Pinctada Hotels and Resorts, which includes the multi award-winning boutique retreat Pinctada McAlpine House, once owned by Lord Alister McAlpine . Paspaley is also known as a promoter of beach polo, being the founder of the annual Cable Beach Polo event in Broome, Western Australia. Paspaley is also the Governor of the International Beach Polo Association (Australasian Region).
