= The Castaways (Australian TV series) =

Television series

- Genre: Drama
- Written by: Ian Stuart Black; Ralph Petersen; Ted Roberts
- Directed by: James Gatward; Henri Safran; Frank Arnold
- Countries of origin: Australia; Scotland; West Germany
- No. of seasons: 1
- No. of episodes: 13

Production
- Producer: James Gatward
- Running time: 30 minutes
- Production company: Castaway Productions

Original release
- Network: ABC
- Release: 27 February 1974

Castaway (or The Castaways) is an Australian television drama adventure series which first screened on the ABC in 1974. The series' music was composed by Bruce Smeaton.

== Premise ==
In the 1880s the sailing ship Mary Jane is wrecked on a Pacific island on its way to Australia.

== Cast ==
- Peter Gwynne as Sergeant Holt
- Fred Haltiner as Jan Lindburg
- Volker Eckstein as Mr Fletcher
- Isobel Black as Cathy Dunbar
- Renate Schroeter as Eve Lindburg
- John Bowman as Billy Rose
- Don Barkham as Irving
- Lexia Wilson as Angie
- Alan Cinis as David

== Production ==
It was filmed near Narrabeen and Port Macquarie. The series was an international co production between the ABC, Scottish television and a West German company. This led to several German and British actors being in the cast.
