= Allison Cratchley =

Australian actress

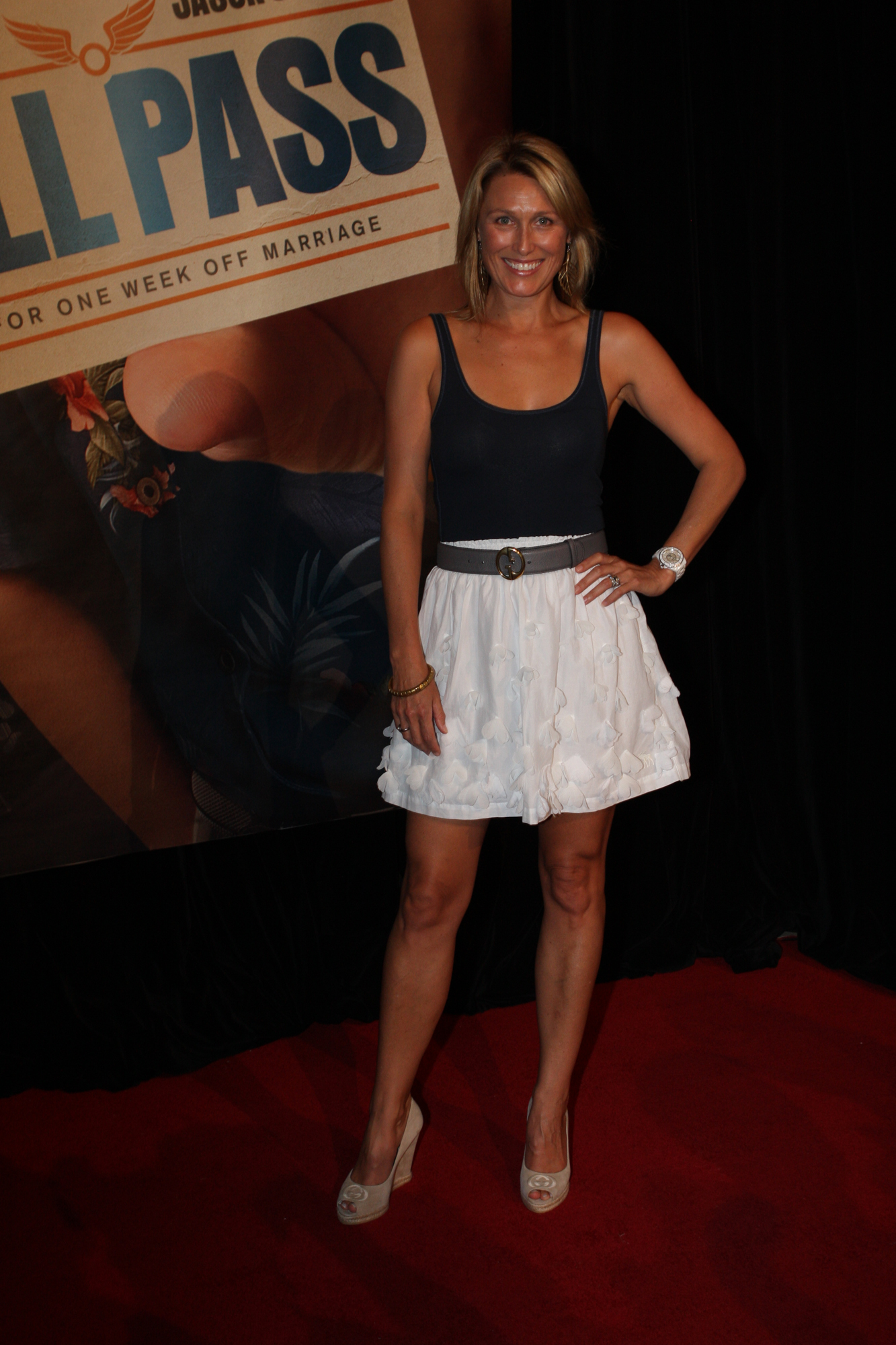
- Cratchley in 2011
- Born: Sydney, New South Wales, Australia
- Occupation: Actress
- Years active: 1990s–present

Allison Cratchley is an Australian actress. She is best known for television roles including Constable Emma "Woodsy" Woods on the series Water Rats, as well as playing Dr Zoe Gallagher on All Saints.

== Early life ==
Cratchley was raised on Sydney's northern beaches. She is the oldest of three children.

== Career ==
Cratchley's first notable appearances were on the TV show Neighbours. She was a leading lady in the Australian fast car movie In the Red alongside Damian Bradford and Terry Serio in 1999.

From 1996 to 2001, Cratchley was a regular main cast member of the Australian series Water Rats. She played water policewoman, Constable Emma Woods.

In 2006, Cratchley joined the cast of the television series All Saints, in the role of Dr. Zoe Gallagher, a role she played to late 2008.

Three years later, she appeared in a small role on the television series Packed to the Rafters. She also played the role of a diver, Judes, in the James Cameron 2011 Australian 3D movie, Sanctum.

In 2012, Cratchley appeared as Melissa Gregg on the TV series Home and Away, a role she played for several episodes.
