= Wayne Pygram =

Australian actor

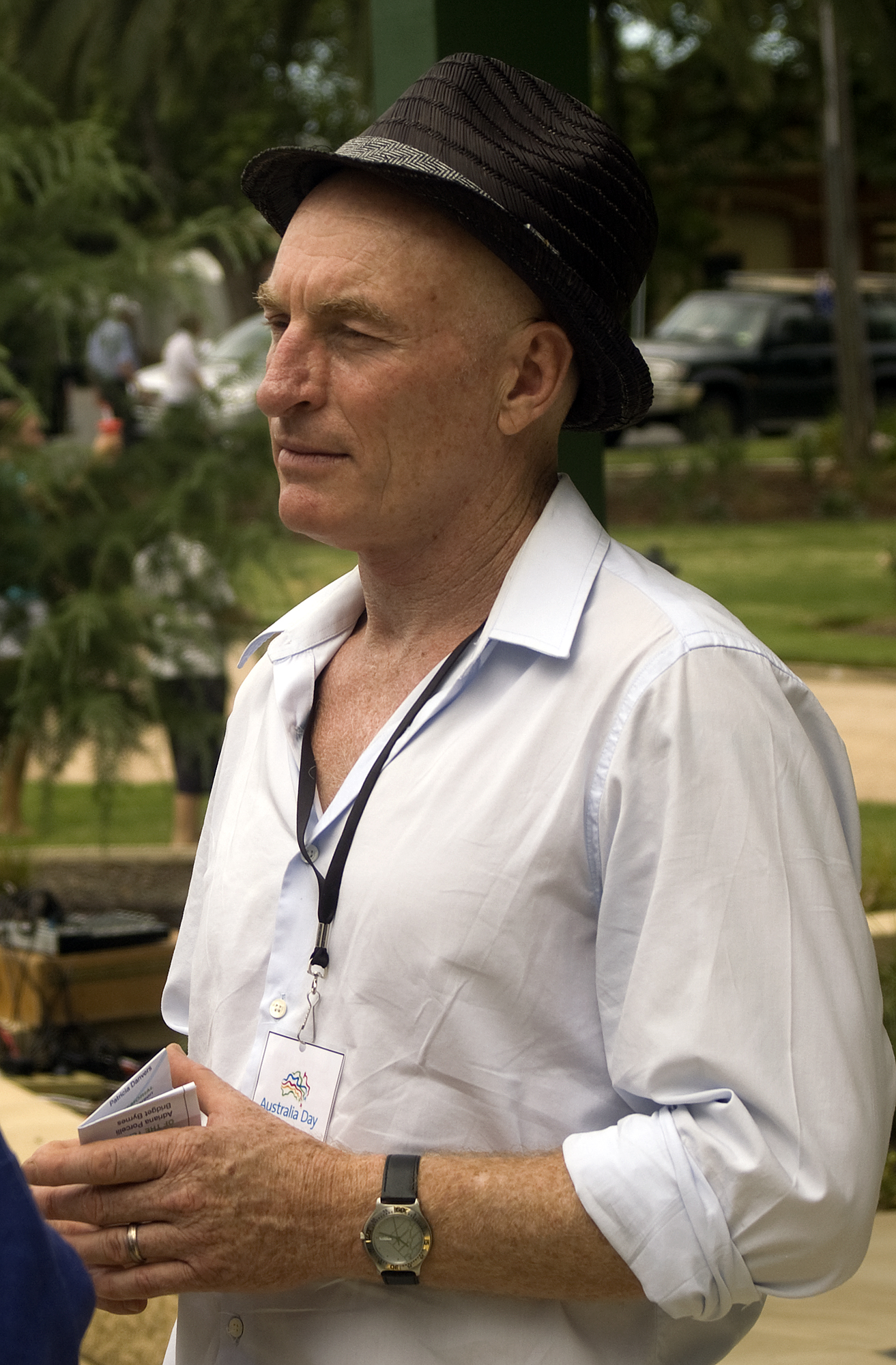
- Pygram at an Australia Day ceremony in Wagga Wagga (2011)
- Born: Wayne Pigram; Cootamundra, New South Wales, Australia

Wayne Pigram, known professionally as Wayne Pygram, is an Australian actor and musician. He is known for his role as Scorpius in the science fiction series Farscape (2000-2004). He briefly appeared in Star Wars: Episode III – Revenge of the Sith, portraying Grand Moff Tarkin in 2005. He also appeared in the television series Lost in 2006.

He has played the drums in numerous bands, including Signal Room, and has taught percussion, including at the Riverina Conservatorium of Music.

== Early life and education ==
Wayne Pigram was born in Cootamundra, New South Wales, and raised in Wagga Wagga. As a teen, he was a drummer in a dance group in Wagga Wagga.

He initially studied art at Riverina College of Advanced Education, but later changed majors to primary school education. While in college, Pygram became a member of a theatre troupe known as the Riverina Trucking Company.

He left Wagga Wagga in the early 1980s.

== Career ==
=== Acting ===
Before acting in films and television, Pygram was a regular on the Australian theatre circuit, and has continued to appear on stage until at least 2005. Productions he has appeared in include The Resistible Rise of Arturo Ui (1985) and All's Well That Ends Well with Nimrod Theatre Company, as well as The Rocky Horror Show, Sweet Bird of Youth, King Lear, and The Threepenny Opera. He also performed in several productions by The Sydney Theatre Company, Belvoir St Theatre, the Nimrod, and Griffin Theatre Company.

He appeared in the films Farewell to the King (1989) and Return to the Blue Lagoon (1991), and Doing Time for Patsy Cline (1997).

In 1995 he played the role as firefighter Quentin "Spit" Jacobsen in the TV series Fire, and was one of the few to return for its second series in 1996. In 1998, he guest-starred as Sam Kristovsky in episode 24 of Wildside.

In 2001 he played Ian Woodford in the long-running Australian soap Home and Away from 2001,

He played Scorpius in the science fiction series Farscape (2000–2003) and the miniseries that followed, Farscape: The Peacekeeper Wars (2004). He returned to Home and Away after Farscape.

In 2005, Pygram made a brief cameo appearance in Star Wars: Episode III – Revenge of the Sith as a young Grand Moff Tarkin, the character which Peter Cushing had played 28 years earlier in A New Hope. For this role, he wore extensive facial prosthetics to make him look more like Peter Cushing, the original actor in this role in the first three movies.

In 2006, he appeared in an episode of Lost called "S.O.S." as a faith healer named Isaac of Uluru. He has also had guest roles on the series My Place, A Country Practice, All Saints, Water Rats, Stingers, Murder Call, Medivac, Time Trax, and The Lost World (1999–2001). In 2010 he was in Underbelly: The Golden Mile.

In 2018 he played Ryland Webster, Prime Minister of Australia, in the final season of Rake.

After moving back to Wagga Wagga, he became a member of the Lichen Collective, a collective of actors, creators, and designers. They produced a theatrical piece called Rush, which was written and performed by Pygram, Samantha Dowdeswell, and Dominique Sweeney, at the Riverina Playhouse in 2020.

In 2022, he was a voice actor in the video game High on Life.

=== Music ===
Pygram has played the drums in numerous bands, including with Farscape co-star Anthony Simcoe in Signal Room. He has also collaborated with musicians such as Lloyd Swanton (The Necks), Klaus Bussman, and Michael King. He has worked with producer Tim Winton of Powderfinger, and as a member of the bands Ha Ha Ha and Edot. He toured southeast Asia with the dance collective Kix Interactive, and did drumming work for Kodak, Visa Corporation, Foster's, and Heineken.

As of 2018 he has been teaching Percussion at the Riverina Conservatorium of Music in Wagga Wagga.

== Personal life ==
Pygram lived and worked in Los Angeles for three years from around 2003 to 2006/7.

He has a son.

== Filmography ==
=== Film ===
- Warming Up (1985) – Wombat
- The First Kangaroos (1988) – Abie Rosenfeldt
- Farewell to the King (1989) – Bren Armstrong
- Return to the Blue Lagoon (1991) – Kearney
- Hammers Over the Anvil (1993) – Snarley Burns
- The Custodian (1993) – Det. Massey
- Doing Time for Patsy Cline (1997) – Geoff Spinks
- The Day of the Roses (1998, TV Mini-Series) – Sgt. Joe Beecroft
- Risk (2000) – Mick
- Star Wars: Episode III – Revenge of the Sith (2005) – Wilhuff Tarkin
- Heatstroke (2008) – Mental Blanakoff

=== Television ===
- The Last Resort (1988)
- Heroes II: The Return (1991) – Lt Bruno Reymond (Rimau member)
- The Girl From Tomorrow (1992) – Guard
- Fire (1995) – Senior Station Officer Quentin 'Spit' Jacobsen
- Roar (1997) – Goll
- The Lost World (1999–2001) – Captain Tark, Noru
- Home and Away (2001–2008) – Ian Woodford / Ian Muir
- Farscape (2000–2003) – Scorpius / Harvey
- Heroes' Mountain (2002, TV Movie) – Col Langdon
- Farscape: The Peacekeeper Wars (2004) – Scorpius / Harvey
- Through My Eyes (2004) – Rice
- Lost (2006) – Isaac of Uluru
- Underbelly: The Golden Mile (2010) – Police Commissioner
