= I, E.T. =

- Farscape episode
- John Crichton becomes the first alien contact for another world
- Episode no.: Season 1 Episode 2
- Directed by: Pino Amenta
- Written by: Sally Lapiduss
- Production code: #10102
- Original air date: May 8, 1999
- Running time: 50 minutes

Guest appearances
- Mary Mara as Lyneea; Cayde Tasker as Fostro; Boris Brkic as Ryymax

Episode chronology
← Previous "Premiere"	Next → "Exodus from Genesis"

"I, E.T." is the second episode from the first season of the television series Farscape, written by Sally Lapiduss and directed by Pino Amenta. This episode originally aired following "Thank God It's Friday, Again", episode #6.

== Synopsis ==
A Paddac beacon wired to Moya's neural system activates as a result of the removal of her control collar in the previous episode, transmitting location signals to any nearby Peacekeeper ship. Crichton suggests landing Moya in a nearby planet's swamp to muffle the signal, and it is done. Then, Crichton, Aeryn and D'Argo search the planet for a Leviathan anaesthetic ("clorium") to help ease Moya's pain during the surgical removal of the beacon. Rygel is the only one small enough to squeeze through Moya's walls to access the beacon's wiring, but is reluctant to help. In an altercation with Aeryn, Rygel bites a chunk of her arm and eats it, and Aeryn threatens his life. Zhaan intercedes, and ultimately Rygel and Zhaan share an intimate moment as he reveals that he is afraid of damaging Moya by accidental ineptitude.

The Leviathan's arrival on the planet does not go unnoticed: armed locals go to the swamp and begin searching for them. D'Argo and Aeryn attempt to draw them away from Moya while Crichton continues to search. He is discovered by another two of the planet's locals: a nine-year-old boy named Fostro, and his mother Lyneea, a scientist who has spent much of her life searching for extraterrestrials. Crichton finds himself now on the other side of the same situation he himself has only just found himself in: the first member of a species to encounter an extraterrestrial. Back on Moya, Rygel is cutting the beacon, and Zhaan uses her ninth level Pa'u abilities to share Moya's pain.

Crichton spends an enjoyable yet harrowing time with Lynnea and Fostro, as Lynnea is excited about meeting him, but afraid of and for him, as well. The military officers who fund Lynnea arrive to search for the E.T.s, and Lynnea hides John. John discovers that clorium is a simple food spice, and after gaining Lynnea's trust, she gives him some. Unfortunately, D'Argo has been captured. Working with Fostro, John frees D'Argo and they escape. John shares fond adieux with Lynnea, and they return to the ship.

On Moya, Zhaan passes out under intense pain, and Rygel, momentarily trapped in a non-responsive ship, panics. But he finally succeeds in freeing Moya from the beacon just as Crichton and D'Argo return with the clorium; Lyneea gazes in wonder from the steps of her house as she watches the alien ship slowly rise into the skies and take off from her planet. On Moya, John gazes wistfully downwards, missing Earth.

== Production ==
According to Anthony Simcoe, doing the prosthetics for the Fostro character was difficult because Australia (where Farscape was filmed) limits the number of hours that child actors can work each day. Because the prosthetics took hours to apply, there wasn't much time to film the child actors' scenes.

One scene features D'Argo and Aeryn hiding in a tree. D'Argo does something strange behind Aeryn's back where the viewer cannot see, but the action is never explained. In reality, the script called for D'Argo to grab a bird from the air and kill it, but the production ran out of money for that effect, so Anthony Simcoe ad libbed that gesture instead.

== Reception ==
An IGN reviewer felt that the production values for "I, E.T." were "humdrum." Compared to the premiere episode of Farscape. "I, E.T." was looser and "more personal." A BBC reviewer felt that "I, E.T" was "an excellent reversal of all the usual alien contact stories," with "John Crichton in the place of the little green men."

== Home media ==
"I, E.T." was included on a DVD with the premiere episode. An IGN review gave the episodes stories a 7/10, the DVD's video quality a 4/10, the DVD's audio quality a 7/10, and the DVD's bonus features an 8/10.
