= List of Farscape episodes =

Farscape is a science fiction television show. Four regular seasons were produced, from 1999 to 2003. Each season consists of 22 episodes. Each episode is intended to air in a one-hour television timeslot (with commercials), and runs for 44 to 50 minutes. The regular seasons were followed by Farscape: The Peacekeeper Wars in 2004, a 2 part miniseries with an air time of 3 hours. Several of the early episodes of Season One were aired out of the intended order. As the official Farscape website lists them in the production order as opposed to airing order, the list below reflects that.

== Series overview ==
Series	Episodes	Originally released	
Series	Episodes	First released	Last released
1	22	19 March 1999	28 January 2000
2	22	17 March 2000	19 December 2000
3	22	16 March 2001	31 January 2002
4	22	7 June 2002	10 March 2003
Miniseries	2	17 October 2004	18 October 2004

== Episodes ==
=== Season 1 (1999–2000) ===
No. overall	No. in season	Title	Directed by	Written by	Original release date	Prod. code
1	1	"Premiere"	Andrew Prowse	Rockne S. O'Bannon	19 March 1999 (US); 29 November 1999 (UK)	#10101
Present day human John Crichton is unexpectedly sucked through a wormhole and flung to "...some distant part of the universe on a ship, a living ship, full of strange alien life forms", where he becomes trapped with a group of escaped prisoners after he accidentally kills a local law enforcer.
2	2	"I, E.T."	Pino Amenta	Sally Lapiduss	30 April 1999 (US); 20 December 1999 (UK)	#10102
A Peacekeeper beacon goes off and Moya has to land on an alien planet to prevent its signal being intercepted and Moya being discovered. Crichton, D'Argo and Aeryn leave Moya and explore the planet in search of a substance that can be used to numb Moya's senses so the beacon can be removed but Crichton gets separated from the group and meets up with some inhabitants of the planet who hide him from the authorities.
3	3	"Exodus from Genesis"	Brian Henson	Ro Hume	14 May 1999 (US); 10 January 2000 (UK)	#10103
Moya is invaded by spawning space bugs, which produce clones of the crew. To complicate matters, a Peacekeeper retrieval squad arrives and Aeryn begins to suffer heat delirium.
4	4	"Throne for a Loss"	Pino Amenta	Richard Manning	9 April 1999 (US); 6 December 1999 (UK)	#10104
Rygel's plot to appear regal backfires when he, along with a much needed part of Moya's propulsion system, are snatched by Tavlecs who possess drug-dispensing power gauntlets.
5	5	"Back and Back and Back to the Future"	Rowan Woods	Babs Greyhosky	26 March 1999 (US); 13 December 1999 (UK)	#10105
The crew comes across a ship that is molecularly de-stabilizing. D'Argo makes everyone bring the ship's escape pod aboard when he discovers that the ship's passengers are Ilanics, long-time allies of the Luxans. Aboard the escape pod, Crichton gets a shock and starts experiencing strange visions of the future, first of himself and one of the Ilanics, then of Moya's destruction.
6	6	"Thank God It's Friday, Again"	Rowan Woods	David Wilks	23 April 1999 (US); 17 January 2000 (UK)	#10106
D'Argo, after threatening the crew with Luxan hyper-rage, is later found docile and happy on a planet and decides to stay. Crichton discovers that the planet's food contains a drug, with the help of a small band of rebels immune to its effects, and must determine a way to convince the others of the truth about their world and the drug.
7	7	"PK Tech Girl"	Tony Tilse	Nan Hagan	16 April 1999 (US); 24 January 2000 (UK)	#10107
The hulk of the legendary Peacekeeper ship, the Zelbinion, holds a pleasant surprise for Crichton, but Rygel must confront the time spent on the ship where he was tortured by the sadistic commander Captain Durka, while the crew work to reactivate the ship's shields to defend themselves from an attack.
8	8	"That Old Black Magic"	Brendan Maher	Richard Manning	11 June 1999 (US); 31 January 2000 (UK)	#10108
On a commerce planet, Crichton finds himself lured into an alternate reality controlled by Maldis, a being who feeds off negative energy. He is pitted against Crais in a fight to the death, leaving Zhaan to tap into her old darkness to try to help him.
9	9	"DNA Mad Scientist"	Andrew Prowse	Tom Blomquist	18 June 1999 (US); 14 February 2000 (UK)	#10109
In exchange for samples of their DNA, a goatlike genetic scientist offers the Moyans star charts to reach their respective homeworlds, but his demands become too extreme when he takes one of Pilot's arms and his experiments result in Aeryn mutating into a Pilot hybrid.
10	10	"They've Got a Secret"	Ian Watson	Sally Lapiduss	25 June 1999 (US); 21 February 2000 (UK)	#10110
While inspecting access shafts for hidden dangerous peacekeeper technology D'Argo is flushed into space. The DRDs turn on the crew and Moya cuts off life support, while the crew attempts to find the cause from a revived but delusional D'Argo.
11	11	"Till the Blood Runs Clear"	Tony Tilse	Douglas Heyes, Jr.	9 July 1999 (US); 28 February 2000 (UK)	#10111
After creating a wormhole, Crichton's module is repaired on a nearby planet by Furlow, while Vorcarian Blood Trackers Rorf and Rorg attempt to collect the Peacekeeper bounty placed on their heads.
12	12	"Rhapsody in Blue"	Andrew Prowse	Story by : David Kemper & Ro Hume; Teleplay by : David Kemper	23 July 1999 (US); 13 March 2000 (UK)	#10112
As her shipmates are disabled by induced dreams, Zhaan is asked to help an outpost of fellow Delvians attempting to avoid the madness that threatens them.
13	13	"The Flax"	Peter Andrikidis	Justin Monjo	16 July 1999 (US); 6 March 2000 (UK)	#10113
John's flying lessons with Aeryn come to an abrupt end when he is caught in a net left by Zenetian pirates to trap ships. D'Argo must choose between potentially finding his son and rescuing John and Aeryn.
14	14	"Jeremiah Crichton"	Ian Watson	Douglas Heyes, Jr.	30 July 1999 (US); 20 March 2000 (UK)	#10114
Seemingly abandoned after crash-landing on an idyllic planet, Crichton starts a peaceful life alongside inhabitants once ruled by the Hynerians. He unintentionally becomes involved in a power struggle which puts his life in danger.
15	15	"Durka Returns"	Tony Tilse	Grant McAloon	13 August 1999 (US); 27 March 2000 (UK)	#10115
A collision with a Nebari ship brings a Nebari criminal named Chiana to Moya, along with a mentally cleansed Captain Durka much to the surprise of Rygel.
16	16	"A Human Reaction"	Rowan Woods	Justin Monjo	20 August 1999 (US); 3 April 2000 (UK)	#10116
Returning to Earth through a wormhole, Crichton receives an unfriendly welcome but is reunited with his father. Aeryn, D'Argo and Rygel arrive to rescue Crichton but receive less than humane treatment.
17	17	"Through the Looking Glass"	Ian Watson	David Kemper	10 September 1999 (US); 10 April 2000 (UK)	#10117
Moya performs an emergency starburst that fragments her into four different dimensions. As John attempts to find crewmembers missing in each dimension, an energy creature appears to add more danger to their predicament.
18	18	"A Bug's Life"	Tony Tilse	Rockne S. O'Bannon	17 September 1999 (US); 17 April 2000 (UK)	#10118
When a group of Peacekeepers from a damaged Marauder board Moya, the crew pretend to be a Peacekeeper prison vessel. The Peacekeepers' secret cargo presents a serious threat when Rygel and Chiana open the container.
19	19	"Nerve" (Part 1)	Rowan Woods	Richard Manning	7 January 2000 (US); 8 May 2000 (UK)	#10119
When an injury Aeryn sustained in A Bug's Life threatens to kill her, Crichton and Chiana travel undercover to a nearby Peacekeeper base to obtain a tissue transplant, and are aided by Gilina. Base leader Scorpius penetrates Crichton's disguise and subjects him to an interrogation device called the Aurora Chair. Crichton's cellmate is a masked individual named Stark.
20	20	"The Hidden Memory" (Part 2)	Ian Watson	Justin Monjo	14 January 2000 (US); 15 May 2000 (UK)	#10120
After a partial recovery, Aeryn leads Zhaan and D'Argo to the Gammak Base to rescue Crichton. At the base, Gilina does her best to help Crichton who is being repeatedly subjected to the Aurora Chair by Scorpius and Crais. Elsewhere, Chiana and Rygel have problems of their own when the pregnant Moya goes into labor.
21	21	"Bone to Be Wild"	Andrew Prowse	David Kemper & Rockne S. O'Bannon	21 January 2000 (US); 22 May 2000 (UK)	#10121
While on the run from the Peacekeepers, the crew of Moya takes shelter in a hollow asteroid that has a breathable atmosphere and is filled with flora. They soon discover that the asteroid is not as free of predators as they thought.
22	22	"Family Ties" (Part 1)	Tony Tilse	Rockne S. O'Bannon & David Kemper	28 January 2000 (US); 5 June 2000 (UK)	#10122
When Rygel decides to sell out the crew of Moya to the Peacekeepers, the crew must come up with a way to escape capture. Their luck changes when Rygel returns along with Crais. They formulate a risky plan to destroy the Gammak Base.

=== Season 2 (2000–01) ===
No. overall	No. in season	Title	Directed by	Written by	Original release date	Prod. code
23	1	"Mind the Baby" (Part 2)	Andrew Prowse	Richard Manning	17 March 2000 (US); 12 June 2000 (UK)	#10202
Crichton, Aeryn and D'argo are stranded in an asteroid field while Scorpius searches for them. Their safety depends on Crais, who is nearby in Talyn. Aeryn teaches Crais how to control the young Leviathan—the only thing she can offer in return for the lives of her friends. When Moya returns to the asteroid field to look for her offspring, and Crichton decides to remove Crais from control of Talyn, Scorpius finally sees his chance to strike.
24	2	"Vitas Mortis"	Tony Tilse	Grant McAloon	24 March 2000 (US); 19 June 2000 (UK)	#10203
D'Argo takes part in a sacred ritual that helps a dying Luxan, an Orican, to pass on. During the ritual the Orican invokes a ritual of renewal, drawing from what she thinks is D'Argo's strength. Consequently Moya starts to age rapidly.
25	3	"Taking the Stone"	Rowan Woods	Justin Monjo	31 March 2000 (US); 10 July 2000 (UK)	#10204
Chiana leaves Moya and takes residence on a planet populated by a young group of aliens who take part in a dangerous and life-threatening rite.
26	4	"Crackers Don't Matter"	Ian Watson	Justin Monjo	7 April 2000 (US); 17 July 2000 (UK)	#10205
The crew returns from a Commerce Planet with a load of crackers and an alien called T'raltixx, who promises he can alter Moya's electromagnets to make her untraceable. Crichton is skeptical; it seems too good to be true. As they pass through a constellation of pulsars, an increasing paranoia affects the crew, turning them violently against each other. Crichton must fight against his own paranoid delusions to work out what T'raltixx is actually doing—and how to stop him.
27	5	"The Way We Weren't"	Tony Tilse	Naren Shankar	14 April 2000 (US); 24 July 2000 (UK)	#10207
A datacam tape is uncovered showing Aeryn as part of a Peacekeeper firing squad that executed Moya's first pilot. The rest of the crew want answers but Aeryn is reluctant to revisit her past—especially her relationship with Velorek, the man who grafted the current Pilot into Moya's systems. Pilot refuses to communicate with the crew, not wanting to reveal his own complicity in the murky circumstances surrounding his installment as Moya's pilot.
28	6	"Picture if You Will"	Andrew Prowse	Peter Neale	21 April 2000 (US); 31 July 2000 (UK)	#10206
Chiana is given a picture that predicts the future. It depicts the death of Chiana, followed by the rest of the crew who appear to die one by one in self-fulfilling prophecies.
29	7	"Home on the Remains"	Rowan Woods	Gabrielle Stanton & Harry Werksman	16 June 2000 (US); 7 August 2000 (UK)	#10208
Desperately short of food, Chiana leads the crew to a dead Budong where she once worked. Without any currency, they must work for food and supply the deteriorating Zhaan with meat.
30	8	"Dream a Little Dream" "Re:Union"	Ian Watson	Rockne S. O'Bannon	23 June 2000 (US); 14 August 2000 (UK)	#10201
When Zhaan and Crichton are stranded in a transport pod, Zhaan recounts the story of her time with Chiana and Rygel after "Family Ties". They landed on a planet where 90% of the population are lawyers, and Zhaan was framed for murder.
31	9	"Out of Their Minds"	Ian Watson	Michael Cassutt	7 July 2000 (US); 4 September 2000 (UK)	#10209
After an attack by the Halosians, the crew of Moya find their minds and bodies switched. They must find a way to get their minds back into their own bodies before the Halosians can power up again and destroy Moya.
32	10	"My Three Crichtons"	Catherine Millar	Story by : Harry Werksman & Gabrielle Stanton; Teleplay by : Grant McAloon	14 July 2000 (US); 2 October 2000 (UK)	#10212
A strange energy ball enters Moya and engulfs Crichton. He emerges, followed by a Neanderthal-like version of himself and another version that appears to be a future-evolved human. When communication with the energy ball is established, it states that it will leave without destroying Moya, but one of the Crichtons must be sacrificed for its research.
33	11	"Look at the Princess (Part 1): A Kiss Is But a Kiss"	Andrew Prowse & Tony Tilse	David Kemper	21 July 2000 (US); 11 September 2000 (UK)	#10210
To avoid capture by Scorpius Crichton is forced to propose to a Princess — however, there are competitors for the throne and a rival working with a Scarran plans to eliminate Crichton.
34	12	"Look at the Princess (Part 2): I Do, I Think"	Andrew Prowse & Tony Tilse	David Kemper	28 July 2000 (US); 18 September 2000 (UK)	#10221
After an assassination attempt, Crichton is put into hiding on an orbiting cargo ship, but he is betrayed to Scorpius. Aeryn accepts a proposal to go on a hazardous rock-climbing trip with a local suitor.
35	13	"Look at the Princess (Part 3): The Maltese Crichton"	Andrew Prowse & Tony Tilse	David Kemper	4 August 2000 (US); 25 September 2000 (UK)	#10211
After being transformed into a bronze statue, Crichton is beheaded then found by a Peacekeeper agent. Later, Crichton, D'Argo and even Scorpius must rescue Chiana from a Scarran. Meanwhile, Zhaan and Pilot confront one of Moya's creators.
36	14	"Beware of Dog"	Tony Tilse	Naren Shankar	11 August 2000 (US); 9 October 2000(UK)	#10213
Chiana buys a parasite-hunting Vork, which creates chaos on board Moya. After several attacks it is suspected that the Vork itself may be the parasite.
37	15	"Won't Get Fooled Again"	Rowan Woods	Richard Manning	18 August 2000 (US); 30 October 2000 (UK)	#10214
Crichton wakes up on Earth after crashing Farscape One. He believes it to be an illusion, as in "A Human Reaction", and tries to find a way out. As things become increasingly chaotic, he begins to lose his sanity.
38	16	"The Locket"	Ian Watson	Justin Monjo	25 August 2000 (US); 6 November 2000 (UK)	#10215
While travelling through a mist Aeryn scouts ahead for several hours, but when she emerges, she has aged 165 cycles. She informs Moya's crew that they have to leave lest they be trapped there forever. When she departs again, Crichton follows her only to get trapped on the planet with her, where he's forced to stay for several decades. Stark returns in this episode.
39	17	"The Ugly Truth"	Tony Tilse	Harry Werksman & Gabrielle Stanton	8 September 2000 (US); 13 November 2000 (UK)	#10216
After a Plokavian ship is destroyed by Talyn with Crichton, Aeryn, D'Argo, Zhaan, and Stark on board, they are put on trial by the Plokavians. During their testimony, the story of their meeting with Talyn and Crais is told from a number of perspectives.
40	18	"A Clockwork Nebari"	Rowan Woods	Lily Taylor	15 September 2000 (US); 20 November 2000 (UK)	#10217
Moya is hijacked by two Nebari who administer a mind-cleansing drug to the entire crew, and plan on taking Chiana back to Nebari Prime. Crichton and Rygel, who are immune, must figure out a way to stop their captors before the Nebari reach their rendezvous.
41	19	"Liars, Guns and Money (Part 1): A Not So Simple Plan"	Andrew Prowse	Grant McAloon	4 December 2000 (UK); 5 January 2001 (US)	#10218
Stark returns from the dead with a plan to save D'Argo's son and make them all rich in the process albeit through armed robbery. What they do not know is that it is Scorpius's money they are stealing.
42	20	"Liars, Guns and Money (Part 2): With Friends Like These"	Catherine Millar	Naren Shankar	11 December 2000 (UK); 12 January 2001 (US)	#10219
With Jothee in Scorpius' hands, the crew of Moya recruit several former enemies to raid the Shadow Depository.
43	21	"Liars, Guns and Money (Part 3): Plan B"	Tony Tilse	Justin Monjo	18 December 2000 (UK); 19 January 2001 (US)	#10220
The crew of Moya assault the Shadow Depository in hopes of rescuing Crichton, now in the hands of Scorpius. Money-bugs infest Moya, who suffers grave injury.
44	22	"Die Me, Dichotomy" (Part 1)	Rowan Woods	David Kemper	19 December 2000 (UK); 26 January 2001 (US)	#10222
The crew takes Moya and Crichton to an ice planet, hoping that both can be treated by a Diagnosan. Crichton's neural chip has taken control of his mind and body and will stop at nothing to survive, including harming Aeryn.

=== Season 3 (2001–02) ===
The premiere of season three was preceded with a one-hour recap titled "Farscape Undressed" for new audiences.

No. overall	No. in season	Title	Directed by	Written by	Original release date	Prod. code
45	1	"Season of Death" (Part 2)	Ian Watson	Richard Manning	16 March 2001 (US); 27 August 2001 (UK)	#10301
With the chip removed, John's speech is restored using a donor held in stasis near death, raising ethical issues. A Scarran in stasis is released and attacks John and D'Argo. Aeryn is revived at considerable cost to Zhaan.
46	2	"Suns and Lovers"	Andrew Prowse	Justin Monjo	23 March 2001 (US); 3 September 2001 (UK)	#10302
The crew of Moya arrive at a supposedly cursed space station which is unexpectedly hit by a massive energy storm. As they do their best to help rescue survivors, another storm changes course directly toward the station. They soon figure out that someone on the station is controlling the storm, hoping to destroy it and everyone aboard.
47	3	"Self-Inflicted Wounds (Part 1): Could'a, Would'a, Should'a"	Tony Tilse	David Kemper	30 March 2001 (US); 10 September 2001 (UK)	#10303
While heading to a planet that is hoped to heal Zhaan, Moya collides and becomes fused with a wormhole research vessel, leaving the crew to try to determine a way out before Moya and Pilot die from the damage. Meanwhile, the final Interion, Jool, revives and soon discovers that the cousin died to save Crichton's life.
48	4	"Self-Inflicted Wounds (Part 2): Wait for the Wheel"	Tony Tilse	David Kemper	6 April 2001 (US); 17 September 2001 (UK)	#10304
When it becomes clear that only one of the two ships must survive, the crews of Moya and the Pathfinder vessel must make a choice. In the end, one of Moya's own must make the ultimate sacrifice.
49	5	"…Different Destinations"	Peter Andrikidis	Steve Worland	13 April 2001 (US); 24 September 2001 (UK)	#10305
Struggling to accept the loss of Zhaan, Stark's power combines with goggles that look backward in time, which pulls Moya's crew back in time to the site of a legendary Peacekeeper battle.
50	6	"Eat Me"	Ian Watson	Matt Ford	20 April 2001 (US); 1 October 2001 (UK)	#10306
The crew of Moya come across a diseased Leviathan used by the Peacekeepers as a prison for the criminally insane. It has been taken over by an individual who "twins" the humanoid inhabitants of the ship and uses them as a food source. Talyn is found badly injured with Crais near death.
51	7	"Thanks for Sharing"	Ian Barry	Clayvon C. Harris	15 June 2001 (US); 8 October 2001 (UK)	#10307
The crew of Moya must deal with having two Crichtons, the slowly recuperating Crais and Talyn, and the tumultuous political situation of a nearby planet. In the end, the crew are split when Talyn has to make a quick departure, with both Moya and Talyn carrying a single Crichton aboard. Guest starring Rebecca Gibney as Rinic Sarova.
52	8	"Green Eyed Monster"	Tony Tilse	Ben Browder	22 June 2001 (US); 22 October 2001 (UK)	#10308
Talyn gets swallowed by a Budong, and it is up to Stark to save them. Crichton, already distrustful of Crais, believes he and Aeryn are having an affair while Talyn himself soon shows his hatred of the human.
53	9	"Losing Time"	Catherine Millar	Justin Monjo	29 June 2001 (US); 29 October 2001 (UK)	#10309
Energy riders with hidden agendas occupy the bodies of Moya's crew.
54	10	"Relativity"	Peter Andrikidis	Rockne S. O'Bannon	6 July 2001 (US); 5 November 2001 (UK)	#10310
When the crew set down on a swamp planet to help Talyn recover from his recent injuries, the Peacekeeper Retrieval Squad catches up with them. Aeryn squares off with her relentless mother, Xhalax.
55	11	"Incubator"	Ian Watson	Richard Manning	13 July 2001 (US); 12 November 2001 (UK)	#10311
Hoping to gain access to the wormhole knowledge, Scorpius tells his life story to a neural clone of Crichton created by the chip that was once in Crichton's head. One of Scorpius' scientists absconds and heads to Moya to offer Crichton the secret of wormhole travel.
56	12	"Meltdown"	Ian Barry	Matt Ford	14 July 2001 (US); 19 November 2001 (UK)	#10312
Talyn becomes drawn to the surface of a star, endangering the crew. Stark tries to help a woman trapped between realms in orbit around the star.
57	13	"Scratch 'n Sniff"	Tony Tilse	Lily Taylor	20 July 2001 (US); 24 November 2001 (UK)	#10313
Crichton tells Pilot the highly improbable story of how, during shore leave on a pleasure planet, the crew got mixed up in the drug trade which led to Chiana and Jool being captured.
58	14	"Infinite Possibilities (Part 1): Daedalus Demands"	Peter Andrikidis	Carleton Eastlake	27 July 2001 (US); 26 November 2001 (UK)	#10314
The Ancient in the form of Jack Crichton accuses the John aboard Talyn of carelessly giving away his wormhole knowledge, but John suspects that his module has been copied by Furlow. They return to Dam-Ba-Da where to find Furlow has been attacked and the Scarrans are on their way to steal her information.
59	15	"Infinite Possibilities (Part 2): Icarus Abides"	Ian Watson	Carleton Eastlake	3 August 2001 (US); 3 December 2001 (UK)	#10315
The Ancient helps John construct a device to destroy a Scarran Dreadnought to prevent them from leaving with wormhole technology. Furlow, only motivated by commercial interests, steals the device. John reclaims it but is exposed to a lethal dose of radiation in the process. The Scarran Dreadnought is destroyed, and John soon succumbs to his poisoning, dying by Aeryn's side.
60	16	"Revenging Angel"	Andrew Prowse	David Kemper	10 August 2001 (US); 17 December 2001 (UK)	#10316
When D'Argo's new ship malfunctions, D'Argo blames Crichton and in a fit of hyper-rage knocks him into a coma. While the others attempt to deactivate the mysterious ship's self-destruct before it destroys Moya, Crichton finds himself in a literally animated world. In 2009, TV Guide ranked this episode #82 on its list of the 100 Greatest Episodes.
61	17	"The Choice"	Rowan Woods	Justin Monjo	17 August 2001 (US); 7 January 2002 (UK)	#10317
Aeryn seeks refuge on a planet with a supernatural reputation after the loss of the Crichton she'd grown close to. Stark starts to hear Zhaan's voice, but nothing on this planet is what it seems when an old enemy returns.
62	18	"Fractures"	Tony Tilse	Rockne S. O'Bannon	24 August 2001 (US); 14 January 2002 (UK)	#10318
Moya encounters a band of former Peacekeeper prisoners, one of which is a traitor. Talyn returns, but Aeryn has difficulty accepting the presence of Crichton. Upon learning about his counterpart's sacrifice, Crichton decides he needs to stop Scorpius' wormhole research and plans to board the Command Carrier.
63	19	"I-Yensch, You-Yensch"	Peter Andrikidis	Matt Ford	21 January 2002 (UK); 5 April 2002 (US)	#10319
D'Argo and Rygel meet with Scorpius and several Peacekeeper officers in an unassuming diner, with a list of demands in exchange for Crichton helping with his wormhole research, only to be interrupted by a pair of robbers who take them all hostage. They work together in order to get out alive, and come to an arrangement that will allow Crichton and Aeryn Sun to board the Command Carrier. Meanwhile, Talyn defends himself against a Peacekeeper attack, only to destroy a medical ship full of innocent lives. When the crew attempt to disarm him, he panics and attacks Moya. Eventually Aeryn convinces him to allow them to shut him down and remove his mechanical components.
64	20	"Into the Lion's Den (Part 1): Lambs to the Slaughter"	Ian Watson	Richard Manning	24 January 2002 (UK); 12 April 2002 (US)	#10320
Crichton and the crew of Moya are brought on board Scorpius's command carrier to assist him against the Scarrans, but secretly plans on delaying Scorpius's research. Aeryn meets an old friend among the crew, and Crais is reunited with his previous second-in-command and lover. Crichton and Scorpius are interrupted by the arrival of Grayza, a Peacekeeper Commandant who is attempting to negotiate truces with other races and believes that the wormhole research threatens that. She has Crichton attacked, and the alliance is on the verge of falling apart when Scorpius reveals that he knows of Earth's location, and that if Crichton does not cooperate he will have it destroyed.
65	21	"Into the Lion's Den (Part 2): Wolf in Sheep's Clothing"	Rowan Woods	Rockne S. O'Bannon	28 January 2002 (UK); 19 April 2002 (US)	#10321
Driven to desperation by Scorpius's threat against Earth, Crichton concocts a plan to destroy the command carrier and all of the wormhole research. He takes Scorpius on a ride through a stable wormhole to provide a distraction while Crais slips aboard Talyn, who is docked inside the carrier. Crais convinces Talyn to starburst; in the confined space this causes an enormous explosion, killing them both and crippling the carrier. The crew of Moya battle their way to their craft and escape just before it explodes, effectively ending the Peacekeeper wormhole project.
66	22	"Dog With Two Bones" (Part 1)	Andrew Prowse	David Kemper	31 January 2002 (UK); 26 April 2002 (US)	#10322
As the crew prepare to go their separate ways, a rogue Leviathan attacks Moya. A mysterious old woman forces Crichton to choose between the two things most important to him; Earth or Aeryn.

=== Season 4 (2002–03) ===
No. overall	No. in season	Title	Directed by	Written by	Original release date	Prod. code
67	1	"Crichton Kicks" (Part 2)	Andrew Prowse	David Kemper	7 June 2002 (US); 23 September 2002 (UK)	#10401
After spending months on a dying Leviathan, Crichton's troubles only increase when a visitor crashes her ship aboard only to be followed by a group of less than friendly pirates.
68	2	"What Was Lost (Part 1): Sacrifice"	Rowan Woods	Justin Monjo	14 June 2002 (US); 30 September 2002 (UK)	#10402
Crichton, Chiana, Rygel, and Sikozu head to Arnessk, where they find D'Argo, Jool, and Noranti. The happy reunion isn't about to last when the Peacekeepers, led by Commandant Grayza, are around.
69	3	"What Was Lost (Part 2): Resurrection"	Rowan Woods	Justin Monjo	21 June 2002 (US); 14 October 2002 (UK)	#10403
After escaping Grayza, Crichton helps D'Argo and Sikozu plan an escape from the Peacekeepers before the planet becomes too hostile for any life.
70	4	"Lava's a Many Splendored Thing"	Michael Pattinson	Michael Miller	28 June 2002 (US); 21 October 2002 (UK)	#10404
Thanks to Noranti, the crew on Lo'La are forced to land on a desolate planet where Rygel finds a cache of valuables owned by a group of freedom fighters. When he's caught in the booty's security system, John Crichton and Ka D'Argo find themselves in the middle of a robbery of the cache and must find a way to save him before the thieves decide to execute him.
71	5	"Promises"	Geoff Bennett	Richard Manning	12 July 2002 (US); 28 October 2002 (UK)	#10405
The crew on Lo'La finally reunite with Moya and Aeryn. The good feelings are short lived when Aeryn reveals that she's dying of heat delirium and that Scorpius is on board. Things get worse with the arrival of one of Aeryn's old enemies and a new Peacekeeper weapon.
72	6	"Natural Election"	Ian Watson	Sophie C. Hopkins	19 July 2002 (US); 4 November 2002 (UK)	#10406
While the crew is viewing a wormhole, Moya is suddenly hit by a large, toxic space plant. The crew must find a way to kill the plant before it kills Moya. Aeryn tells Chiana a secret about her pregnancy, and asks her to keep it secret.
73	7	"John Quixote"	Tony Tilse	Ben Browder	26 July 2002 (US); 11 November 2002 (UK)	#10407
John and Chiana enter a bizarre virtual reality game, only to find bizarre versions of the people they know with the gamesmaster being none other than Stark.
74	8	"I Shrink Therefore I Am"	Rowan Woods	Christopher Wheeler	2 August 2002 (US); 18 November 2002 (UK)	#10408
While Crichton and Noranti are away, Moya is boarded by a group of bounty hunters who easily imprison the crew. Crichton and Scorpius must work together to fight them, with things getting more complicated when they find one of the bounty hunters is a Scarran.
75	9	"A Prefect Murder"	Geoff Bennett	Mark Saraceni	9 August 2002 (US); 25 November 2002 (UK)	#10409
The crew of Moya get caught up in a planetary coup, and Aeryn gets bit by a bug that makes her kill 18 members of the planet and Aeryn almost kills John.
76	10	"Coup By Clam"	Ian Watson	Emily Skopov	16 August 2002 (US); 2 December 2002 (UK)	#10410
With Moya struggling to adapt to Tormented Space, the crew stops at an isolated settlement to get assistance. They submit to a routine examination for so-called "Space Madness", but find themselves the victims of an extortion plot by the examining doctor, who has placed toxic quantum clams in their food.
77	11	"Unrealized Reality" (Part 1)	Andrew Prowse	David Kemper	23 August 2002 (US); 16 December 2002 (UK)	#10411
While Crichton is out exploring a wormhole in an EV suit, he's pulled inside. There he finds himself face to face with a mysterious being who warns Crichton of the dangers of wormhole navigation and determines that Crichton may have to die because of what he knows.
78	12	"Kansas" (Part 2)	Rowan Woods	Justin Monjo	30 December 2002 (UK); 10 January 2003 (US)	#10412
Crichton and his friends find themselves on Earth in late October 1985. Unfortunately, Crichton discovers that in this alternate timeline, his father Jack is set to command the space shuttle Challenger on its final mission, which ended in the deaths of all seven crewmembers.
79	13	"Terra Firma" (Part 3)	Peter Andrikidis	Richard Manning	6 January 2003 (UK); 17 January 2003 (US)	#10413
Crichton and the crew of Moya reach present day (2003) Earth. While Moya's non-human passengers are introduced to Crichton's home planet, John finds that returning to his old life easier said than done, as both he and Earth are quite different from when he left. Meanwhile, Grayza's predator stalks the crew from the shadows.
80	14	"Twice Shy"	Kate Woods	David E. Peckinpah	13 January 2003 (UK); 24 January 2003 (US)	#10414
Back in the Uncharted Territories, Moya and crew pick up a mysterious passenger who is much more than she seems.
81	15	"Mental as Anything"	Geoff Bennett	Mark Saraceni	20 January 2003 (UK); 31 January 2003 (US)	#10415
Scorpius takes Moya's male crewmembers to a place where they will receive special training. While Crichton is subjected to conditions that will help him fend off Scarran heat, D'Argo comes face-to-face with Macton, his wife's killer who claims that D'Argo himself killed her in a fit of hyper-rage.
82	16	"Bringing Home the Beacon"	Rowan Woods	Carleton Eastlake	27 January 2003 (UK); 7 February 2003 (US)	#10416
Moya's female crew head for an asteroid outpost, hoping to find a device that will help disguise Moya. It's not long before Peacekeepers and Scarrans arrive at the station, intending to sign a peace treaty which will spell disaster for the Luxan race unless Aeryn can stop them.
83	17	"A Constellation of Doubt"	Andrew Prowse	David Kemper	10 February 2003 (UK); 14 February 2003 (US)	#10417
Attempting to come to terms with Aeryn's abduction, Crichton retreats to his room and watches a documentary detailing humanity's reaction to Moya's recent visit to Earth.
84	18	"Prayer"	Peter Andrikidis	Justin Monjo	17 February 2003 (UK); 21 February 2003 (US)	#10418
Crichton and Scorpius travel to the Bizzaro Moya from "Unrealized Reality" in order to find the location of Katratzi, where they believe Aeryn is being taken. Meanwhile, Aeryn is repeatedly tortured when the Scarrans realize that her baby may be Crichton's.
85	19	"We're So Screwed (Part 1): Fetal Attraction"	Geoff Bennett	David E. Peckinpah	24 February 2003 (UK); 28 February 2003 (US)	#10419
Moya's crew infiltrate a Scarran outpost in an effort to rescue Aeryn. Things don't go as planned, when Noranti deliberately releases a deadly plague.
86	20	"We're So Screwed (Part 2): Hot to Katratzi"	Karl Zwicky	Carleton Eastlake	25 February 2003 (UK); 7 March 2003 (US)	#10420
The crew of Moya head to Katratzi in hopes of rescuing Scorpius, who possesses knowledge of wormholes, from the Scarrans. To do this, Crichton straps an atomic bomb to his hip.
87	21	"We're So Screwed (Part 3): La Bomba"	Rowan Woods	Mark Saraceni	3 March 2003 (UK); 14 March 2003 (US)	#10421
Crichton and the crew of Moya, must find a way to escape Katratzi before the Scarrans decide that they are disposable.
88	22	"Bad Timing"	Andrew Prowse	David Kemper	10 March 2003 (UK); 21 March 2003 (US)	#10422
Crichton learns that the Scarrans are heading to Earth and must consider an alliance with the Peacekeepers; in order to stop his home being destroyed.

=== The Peacekeeper Wars ===
Following the series' unexpected cancellation in September 2002, a miniseries was produced to wrap up the season four cliffhanger and tie up some elements of the series in general. The Peacekeeper Wars was broadcast on 17 and 18 October 2004.

No.	Title	Directed by	Written by	Original release date
89	"The Peacekeeper Wars: Part 1"	Brian Henson	Rockne S. O'Bannon & David Kemper	17 October 2004
Crichton and Aeryn anticipate the birth of their child, only to get caught in the middle of an intergalactic war that puts millions of lives at risk.
90	"The Peacekeeper Wars: Part 2"	Brian Henson	Rockne S. O'Bannon & David Kemper	18 October 2004
Not wanting his child to be born into a world at war, Crichton puts himself at the center of the conflict.
