= Mary Mara =

American actress (1960–2022)

- Publicity photo
- Born: Mary T. Mara; September 21, 1960; Syracuse, New York, U.S.
- Died: June 26, 2022 (aged 61); Cape Vincent, New York, U.S.
- Education: Corcoran High School
- Alma mater: San Francisco State University; Yale University
- Occupation: Actress
- Years active: 1989–2020

Mary T. Mara (September 21, 1960 – June 26, 2022) was an American television and film actress known for her main role as Inspector Bryn Carson on Nash Bridges and appearances on primetime dramas ER and Law & Order. She also appeared in Mr. Saturday Night.

== Early life and education ==
Mara was born in Syracuse, New York, on September 21, 1960. Her father, Roger, worked as the director of special events for the New York State Fair; her mother, Lucille, was an accountant. Mara had a brother and two sisters. She attended Corcoran High School in Syracuse. After graduating, she studied at San Francisco State University and the Yale School of Drama, obtaining a Master of Fine Arts from the latter institution.

== Career ==
Mara made her film debut in the 1989 television film The Preppie Murder. In the same year, she participated in the New York Shakespeare Festival's production of Twelfth Night, alongside Michelle Pfeiffer, Jeff Goldblum and Mary Elizabeth Mastrantonio. She later featured in Mr. Saturday Night (1992), starring alongside Billy Crystal as his character's estranged daughter.

Mara's breakthrough role came on ER, which was the most popular medical drama airing on prime time television during the mid-1990s. She played Loretta Sweets, a patient with cervical cancer, in nine episodes from 1995 to 1996. This helped spur her into the starring role of Inspector Bryn Carson on Nash Bridges from 1996 to 1997. When reflecting on that role several years later, she noted that it was a "male-dominated show", adding that although the writers "started to write for me really well about halfway through the season", the producers "were afraid I would stand out too much." She also featured on shows such as Law & Order, NYPD Blue, and Ally McBeal around this time.

During the later part of her career, Mara appeared as a recurring character in Dexter (2009) as Valerie Hodges and Ray Donovan (2013) as Mrs. Sullivan. She also starred in the horror film Prom Night (2008). Her final role was in the 2020 film Break Even. After appearing in the film, Mara retired from acting.

== Personal life and death ==
Mara lived a bicoastal life in New York City and Southern California. According to Jon Lindstrom, she underwent chemotherapy for cancer in 2008, when they performed together in the play In Heat by Malcolm Danare. Following her retirement from acting, she returned to Syracuse. She resided in Cape Vincent, New York, at the time of her death. Mara had a stepdaughter.

Mara drowned on the morning of June 26, 2022, in Cape Vincent while swimming in the St. Lawrence River. She was 61. Tributes to Mara were posted on social media by Billy Crystal, Annette O'Toole, and Jon Lindstrom. Her death was ruled an accident.

== Filmography ==
=== Film ===
Year	Title	Role	Notes
1989	The Preppie Murder	Susan Bird	Television film Film debut
1990	Blue Steel	Wife	
1991	The Hard Way	Detective China	
1991	True Colors	Sophia Palmeri	
1991	Out of the Rain	Trisha	
1992	Mr. Saturday Night	Susan	
1992	Love Potion No. 9	Marisa	
1995	Just Looking	Alicia	
1995	Indictment: The McMartin Trial	Detective Jane Hoag	
1996	Bound	Sue the Bartender	
1996	What Kind of Mother Are You?	Marcy Hackman	Television film
1998	A Civil Action	Kathy Boyer	
1999	Switched at Birth	Judy	Television film
2001	Stranger Inside	Tanya	Television film
2001	Lloyd	JoAnn	
2001	K-PAX	Abby	
2002
2002	Saint Sinner	Munkar	Television film
2006	Undoing	Kasawa	
2006	Gridiron Gang	Kenny's mom	
2008	Prom Night	Mrs. Waters	
2020	Break Even	Molly	

=== Television ===
Year	Title	Role	Notes
1993, 1999	Law & Order	Mrs. Sharkey/Sally Knight	2 episodes
1994, 1998	NYPD Blue	Linda Walker/Theresa Carlin	2 episodes
1995–96	ER	Loretta Sweet	9 episodes
1996–97	Nash Bridges	Inspector Bryn Carson	Main character, seasons 1–2
1997	Dellaventura	Anne Morgan	Episode: "Clean Slate"
1997	Spicy City	Alice / Geisha	Voice
1998	The Visitor	Magnolia Vale	Episode: "The Chain"
1999	Ally McBeal	Julie Stall	Episode: "Angels and Blimps"
1999	Farscape	Lyneea	Episode: "I, E.T."
1999	Profiler	Mrs. Atkins	Episode: "Infidelity"
1999	G vs E	Leona	Episode: "Evilator"
2001	The Practice	Dr. Jane Lefkowitz	2 episodes
2001	Gideon's Crossing	Dr. Jane Lefkowitz	2 episodes
2001	Becker	Beth	Episode: "Really Good Advice"
2001	Judging Amy	Deborah Mahaffey	Episode: "Hold on Tight"
2001	The West Wing	Sherri Wexler	Episode: "On the Day Before"
2001	Third Watch	Mrs. Jensen	2 episodes
2002	Boston Public	Pauline Campbell	Episode: "Chapter Thirty-Two"
2002	Philly	Melissa Cannon	Episode: "Meat Me in Philly"
2002	Crossing Jordan	Denise Tremaine	Episode: "Lost and Found"
2003–04	The Handler	Camille	3 episodes
2004	The Guardian	Alison Scanlon	Episode: "The Watchers"
2004	Star Trek: Enterprise	Sphere Builder Presage	3 episodes
2004	Without a Trace	Mrs. Corcoran	Episode: "In the Dark"
2004	7th Heaven	Nurse	Episode: "Gratitude"
2004	Joan of Arcadia	Sarah Polonsky	Episode: "The Book of Questions"
2005	Law & Order: Special Victims Unit	Carlene Ballentine	Episode: "Pure"
2005	Monk	Treesa Crane	Episode: "Mr. Monk and the Kid"
2005	Nip/Tuck	Natalie Holden	Episode: "Sal Perri"
2006	Bones	Helen Bronson	Episode: "The Woman in the Tunnel"
2009	Dexter	Valerie Hodges	3 episodes
2009	Lost	Jill	2 episodes
2009	Lie to Me	Krentz	Episode: "Control Factor"
2009	Saving Grace	Zoe	Episode: "She's a Lump"
2013	Ray Donovan	Mrs. Sullivan	4 episodes
2013	Shameless	Nance	2 episodes
2014	Criminal Minds	Judith Anderson	Episode: "Mr. and Mrs. Anderson"
2014	General Hospital	Selma	
