= Season of Death =

- Farscape episode
- Aeryn's body in stasis
- Episode no.: Season 3 Episode 1
- Directed by: Ian Watson
- Written by: Richard Manning
- Original air date: March 16, 2001

Guest appearances
- Hugh Keays-Byrne (Grunchlk); Matthew Newton (Jothee); David Franklin (Lt. Braca); Thomas Holesgrove (Diagnosan Tocot / Plonek the Scarran); Aaron Catalan (Officer Kobrin)

Episode chronology
← Previous "Die Me, Dichotomy"	Next → "Suns and Lovers"

"Season of Death" is an episode from the third season of the Australian television series Farscape, written by Richard Manning and directed by Ian Watson.

== Synopsis ==
Events continue from the previous episode. The Diagnosan wakes up, only momentarily felled by Scorpius, not killed as it had seemed. The Moyans, who had been in space, arrive to help. Zhaan shares unity with John to see if Scorpius is gone from his mind and determines that he is not. The "mind" Scorpius, in conversation with John, wants John to kill himself because he doesn't want to be stuck in John's head. John wants to oblige—he doesn't want to live if Aeryn is dead. D'Argo tells him in no uncertain terms that Aeryn would want him to live, that she gave her life to save him. The Diagnosan restores John's speech, using some neural tissue from one of three compatible bodies from the species called "Interons" that are in storage. Grunschlk is confronted by Braca—he was in Braca's pay and told Scorpius when John arrived. Scorpius puts a receiver in Grunschlk's head in order to take remote control of his body. Fearing he would be betrayed by Scorpius, Grunschlk began a re-animation procedure for a frozen Scarran left behind by the Scarrans in case Scorpius returned. The Scarran kills the Diagnosan who tried to investigate the re-animation sequence. John and D'Argo try to escape from the Peacekeepers, only to come face to face with the Scarran, while they are unarmed. Meanwhile, Zhaan notices that Aeryn is not truly dead, only mostly dead. Stark realizes what she's going to do and tries to dissuade her, but she knocks him out and shares unity with Aeryn. Over Aeryn's protests, Zhaan gives her some of her life force, restoring Aeryn to life. Aeryn then rescues Zhaan and Stark from the PKs, and then rescues John and D'Argo from the Scarran, using D'Argo's qualta blade that he'd left with her body. Seeing her, John assumes he's gone mad, or is hallucinating, or it's a trick. Aeryn explains that it was Zhaan, she "did a unity thing." He reaches out and sees the place where he cut the lock of her hair, and is overcome with emotion—they have a joyful reunion and escape the planet with Talyn's help.

Talyn blows up a transport that he thinks Scorpius is on, but Scorpius is safely on the planet (having sent only his pilot in the transport and remotely communicated with Talyn), and escapes with the neural chip. Grunschlk having been put into a stasis tube by the now dead Scarran is left to his frozen fate. John insists the two remaining Interons be brought onto Moya.

On Moya, Aeryn and John confess their love for each other, and have a passionate embrace... which Aeryn then breaks, telling John they must not act on their feelings, too much is at stake; Zhaan gave her life for love of them. As the episode draws to a close, Zhaan is in a weakened state, dying.

== Production ==
According to David Kemper, Richard Manning's title for the episode, "Season of Death", was a "prescient" choice and "became the title of the...overarching series."

Farscape's production staff were pleased with how the episode turned out. Writer Justin Monjo stated, "It's full of surprises and we are all very excited about it. I would say its bigger and better than ever." The episode's writer, Richard Manning, on the other hand, was critical of some aspects of the episode. "I found a line I want to change...'She did a Unity thing' / I don't think that's what was written / A "Unity thing" sounds like some kinda dance" He also acknowledged the difficulties involved in resurrecting Aeryn: "'it's such a fine line between stupid and clever' / I agree that it's good to leave some of 'em dead / elsewise it doesn't mean much"

Composer Guy Gross references the music from "Die Me, Dichotomy" in this episode, reprising Aeryn's "Requiem", but changing it from a minor key to a major key.

As of this episode, Farscape's opening credits were completely re-edited with a new introductive voice-over from Ben Browder, reworked theme music, and new footage of the cast: they now also show Paul Goddard, Lani Tupu and Wayne Pygram as cast regulars (in that order) after Gigi Edgley. Episodes now bear their titles onscreen after the credits. Composer Guy Gross said of the new title music: "The music for the season three opener was created over a 3 week period. It was decided that rather than simply create a new arrangement of the previous theme, I would compose an original theme that made gentle musical references to the old theme. As a result the credits read: 'theme composed by Guy Gross, adapted from the original theme by Subvision'."

Thomas Holesgrove played both Tocot and Plomek during the fight scene between the two. Two separate takes were filmed with Holesgrove working opposite stunt players, who were edited out of the final scene.

== Reception ==
The episode was well received by fans and critics alike. Fan surveys consistently rank the episode among Farscape's best. Critics, too, responded favorably to the episode. Television Without Pity rated the episode "A", stating, "I defy anyone to sit through this episode without feeling drained afterward. And yet, we'll all be hurtling through the rest of season three, 'cause it hurts so good." Similarly, SCI FI Wire rated the episode "A", stating, "The season premiere ties up the cliffhangers nicely and heads the show in an effective new direction." A TV Guide feature highlighted the episode while pointing to the show's "intelligent stories, witty dialogue and out-of-this-world production values."

"Season of Death" earned a 1.9 Nielsen rating, making it the highest rated of all Farscape episodes (this rating was tied by the second night of The Peacekeeper Wars miniseries).

== Guest stars ==
- Hugh Keays-Byrne as Grunchlk
- Matthew Newton as Jothee
- David Franklin as Lieutenant Braca
- Thomas Holesgrove as Diagnosan Tocot and Plonek the Scarran
- Aaron Catalan as Officer Kobrin
