= Crackers Don't Matter =

- Farscape episode
- Crichton acting paranoid
- Episode no.: Season 2 Episode 4
- Directed by: Ian Watson
- Written by: Justin Monjo
- Original air date: April 7, 2000

Episode chronology
← Previous "Taking the Stone"	Next → "The Way We Weren't"

"Crackers Don't Matter" is the fourth episode from the second season of the Australian-American television series Farscape, written by Justin Monjo and directed by Ian Watson.

== Synopsis ==
The crew of Moya take on board a blind engineer named T'raltixx, whom they have hired to create cloaking technology for Moya. Though John is suspicious of T'raltixx's motives, the viability of the engineer's technology is proved when he is able to make John's module partially disappear in a demonstration. He claims, however, that in order to do the same for a ship as large as Moya, she must be moved to the ship yards on his home planet, which the crew reluctantly agree to do. Together they travel through an area rich in pulsars to his planet to obtain the device. He warns them that in some "lesser species," the intense light exhibited by the pulsars can cause some irrational behavior. Quickly, that proves to be true as Aeryn, Chiana, Rygel, John, and D'Argo begin accusing each other and hunting each other throughout the ship. As they become increasingly paranoid and irrational, even Pilot is affected, becoming angry and hostile towards Moya's passengers. Zhaan, meanwhile, has retired to a room to experience the "photogasms" caused by the pulsars. As the situation degenerates, the disagreements turn violent. John appears to be the least affected, though he does hallucinate Scorpius in a Hawaiian shirt, who encourages him to kill Aeryn and then eat pizza and drink margaritas.

Ultimately, John captures the rest of the crew and explains to them that it's not the pulsars causing them to act so strangely, but rather T'raltixx, who is sucking all the power out of Moya to create intensely bright light. He intends for the rest of the crew to kill each other off so that he and the rest of his species can use the ship and its light to rise from their dormant state, and spread through the galaxy. The crew finally band together to create a protective outfit for John against the intense radiation. He then battles T'raltixx and defeats him. The episode ends with the crew awkwardly apologizing to one another for their behavior.

== Production ==
Writer Justin Monjo had to pen the episode in an extremely short time because delays in the completion of "Picture if You Will" forced the rapid production of a shipbound story.

Ian Watson described the episode as "the Shining retold" (Ben Browder referenced the film by ad libbing "Heeeere's Johnny" at one point). Watson stated he intentionally made odd production choices, such as ending John and Aeryn's shoot-out with them both running out of bullets, and the use of martial music in a romantic scene: "I was trying to do the unexpected. Trying to push the style and push everything we did into new places. Rather than saying this is safe science fiction, we were trying to work with opposites, trying to make a likeable character unlikeable...We were trying to do inappropriate things to shake the drama up. I think the music followed that through."

After the main unit finished filming, Watson added the controversial near-rape scene: "I was looking through a rough cut of the episode and I thought, 'This hasn't gone dark enough for me.' The story was, they were meant to turn on each other, really turn on each other. There's always a level of niceness, even in dark eps, a line you don't cross. But Crichton doesn't always have to be likeable, and he can go to a place where he's abhorrent to women, particularly. It was designed as an ad hoc response."

Series creator Rockne S. O'Bannon said that the show's production team was still "trying to find the ultimate tone of the show, how far it could go without going absolutely too far. Things like the near-rape scene could be perceived as over the top but were really a question of muscle flexing to see how far we could push the show. But it would have been wrong to push and stay at that level of intensity."

The scene involving D'Argo force-feeding Rygel was edited for being too violent. A new Rygel puppet was introduced in this episode and nearly broken during the force feeding sequence. Three Rygel heads were used for that scene: a special head that could have crackers stuffed in its mouth, a head that could speak, and a head that could be shoved down on the table.

The season-long subplot involving neural clone of Scorpius appearing in John's head via a special chip Scorpius had implanted, had not been created when he appeared in this episode. The writers had been trying to think of ways to have the villain appear in more episodes, to keep up the tension throughout the season. They hit upon John hallucinating Scorpius in this episode, and then realized it worked so well, they retconned the neural clone into the story.

Ben Browder's humming of Richard Wagner's Ride of the Valkyries was added in ADR.

The prosthetic makeup used for the T'raltixx character mean that Danny Adcock had to look through a series of mirrors in order to see, which is why there is a small door on top of the head that opens and closes periodically.

Several props make a reappearance in this episode, including the goggles from "Till the Blood Runs Clear" and Larraq's hat from "A Bug's Life".

== Guest stars ==
- Wayne Pygram as Scorpius
- Danny Adcock as T'raltixx

== Reception ==
The episode was well received by fans and critics.

A BBC reviewer described the episode as "Great fun to watch – and it looked like great fun for the cast, too," praising its handling of conflict:

"Farscape prodded apart some existing conflicts. It didn't make some up that could then be resolved with a hug in the epilogue...Farscape is definitely at its peak when it places true conflict in science fiction settings and the fights between the crew were by far the best elements of this story."

The reviewer found the plot involving T'raltixx less interesting but enjoyed "the revelation that Crichton's ability to fight the problem was down to his deficiencies rather than just down to his being the series lead."

"Crackers Don't Matter" is considered a fan favorite episode. When Farscape was cancelled, fans responded by sending Sci Fi executives packages of crackers in homage to the episode.

Although other episodes prior to "Crackers Don't Matter" toyed with the characters' perceptions of reality, it is generally considered the original "Mind Frell" episode and a definitive example of the type. Even in a later Season 4 episode Crichton himself alludes to T'raltixx as the definition of a mind frell.
