= Premiere (Farscape) =

- Farscape episode
- John Crichton's ship is sucked through the wormhole
- Episode no.: Season 1 Episode 1
- Directed by: Andrew Prowse
- Written by: Rockne S. O'Bannon
- Production code: #10101
- Original air date: March 19, 1999
- Running time: 50 minutes

Guest appearances
- Kent McCord as Jack Crichton; Lani Tupu as Captain Bialar Crais

Episode chronology
← Previous —	Next → "I, E.T."

"Premiere" is the pilot episode of the Farscape series. It was written by series creator Rockne S. O'Bannon and directed by Andrew Prowse. It is the only episode in the series whose opening credits lack Crichton's usual voiceover.

== Synopsis ==
John Crichton, an IASA (International Aeronautics and Space Administration) co-developer of and pilot for the experimental Farscape project and son of famous astronaut Jack Crichton, is unexpectedly sucked through a wormhole to an unknown part of the universe while flying his Farscape One module in order to test a theory. Finding himself in the middle of a skirmish—and watching helplessly as a ship of highly-advanced technology is destroyed after clipping his module—he is captured and brought aboard the Leviathan Moya, a living ship, commandeered by escaped prisoners: Ka D'Argo, a Luxan warrior; Dominar Rygel XVI, a deposed Hynerian ruler; and Pa'u Zotoh Zhaan, a Delvian priestess.

After Crichton is injected with translator microbes, he learns from the ship's Pilot and the rest of the crew that, having freed the ship from her Peacekeeper control collar, their subsequent unplanned starburst not only has them lost, but has dragged a Peacekeeper Prowler and its pilot, Officer Aeryn Sun, along with them. Crichton and Aeryn quickly escape to a commerce planet and connect with the commanding officer of Aeryn's Command Carrier, Captain Bialar Crais, who also captures D'Argo. Crais intends to torture and kill Crichton for Crichton's accidental role in the death of the pilot whose ship had clipped Crichton's "white death-pod": Tauvo Crais, Bialar Crais' younger brother. Aeryn speaks up on Crichton's behalf, which causes Crais to declare her to be "irreversibly contaminated" due to contact with Crichton, who is from an unknown species.

Distracting the Peacekeeper guards, Crichton manages to escape with D'Argo and a reluctant Aeryn back to Moya, only to realize Crais' Command Carrier is in hot pursuit. Unable to starburst away, Crichton manages to use his own acceleration theories, originally formulated for Farscape One, to help Moya successfully escape the Peacekeepers.

Free from pursuit, the escaped prisoners, lost human, and ex-Peacekeeper slowly adjust to life aboard the liberated Leviathan, but not without a few clashes. Crichton explains his confusion and wonder to his father via a tape recording he can never send, as he begins to adapt to his new life.

== Production ==
In 1992, Brian Henson, and The Jim Henson Company wanted to create a showcase to display what they could do for feature films, so they started to think about doing a TV series—initially, something similar to the Star Wars bar scene at Mos Eisley, which featured numerous alien species interacting in a dangerous, dramatic fashion.

The Henson Company's vision for the show was very ambitious, meaning that the costs of building sets and creating the animatronics were prohibitively expensive for the purposes of creating one pilot episode. Consequently, they needed the OK to fund a whole season before they began production in order to make things feasible financially. Thus, while this episode was the premiere of the show, it was not a pilot in the usual sense of the term.

In the shuttle launch scene at the beginning of "Premiere" the shuttle has the insignia "Collaroy." Collaroy is a suburb of Sydney, Australia and is threaded throughout the Farscape series. The creators had originally wanted to make their protagonist an astronaut with NASA, but they couldn't come to terms with the space agency, so they changed their agency to "IASA" (International Air and Space Agency).

In order to save money, the producers originally arranged for two episodes to be filmed at the same time, meaning that Premiere and the episode "I, E.T." were filmed simultaneously.

The entire first season of the show was filmed at Fox Studios in Sydney, which were purpose built structures for filming. After the first season, the buildings were needed for the Star Wars prequels, and the production had to move to new facilities. It remains the only television show to film there.

In order to highlight their puppetry skills, The Henson Company puppeteers created Rygel to be as small as possible, so the viewers could clearly see that it was not a human being in a suit. Similarly, they made Pilot so large and shaped in such a way that it would be clear it was not simply a suited and masked human, either.

== Reception ==
A BBC reviewer felt that while there were obvious influences from other science fiction television programs, Buck Rogers couldn't express the isolation felt by its main character the way Farscape did for John Crichton, and that Star Trek: Voyager wasn't as remotely as satisfying a series. Finally, the reviewer felt that the amount of backstory included in this episode was too much, and should have been spread across several episodes.

An IGN reviewer felt that the puppetry of the characters of Rygel and Pilot was a "50/50" success; Pilot was a "cool, bizarre entity" and he liked his bond with the living ship. A DVD Empire reviewer felt that both Rygel and Pilot were state-of-the-art animated marvels, and surpassed The Jim Henson Company's work on Labyrinth and The Dark Crystal.
