= Farscape =

Australian/American television science fiction series (1999–2004)

- Season 4 title card
- Genre: Science fiction
- Created by: Rockne S. O'Bannon
- Starring: Ben Browder; Claudia Black; Virginia Hey; Anthony Simcoe; Gigi Edgley; Paul Goddard; Lani Tupu; Wayne Pygram; Jonathan Hardy; Tammy MacIntosh; Raelee Hill; Melissa Jaffer
- Music by: Subvision (1999–2000); Guy Gross (2000–03)
- Country of origin: Australia
- Original language: English
- No. of seasons: 4
- No. of episodes: 88 (list of episodes)

Production
- Executive producers: Rockne S. O'Bannon; Brian Henson; Kris Noble; Robert Halmi Jr.; David Kemper; Rod Perth; Richard Manning; Naren Shankar; Juliet Blake
- Producers: Matt Carroll; Sue Milliken; Anthony Winley
- Cinematography: Craig Barden
- Editors: Mark Perry; Neil Thumpston
- Running time: 50 minutes (season 1); 44 minutes (seasons 2–4)
- Production companies: Hallmark Entertainment; Nine Network; The Jim Henson Company

Original release
- Network: Nine Network (Australia); Sci-Fi Channel (United States)
- Release: 19 March 1999 – 21 March 2003

Related
- Farscape: The Peacekeeper Wars (miniseries)

Farscape is a science fiction television series conceived by Rockne S. O'Bannon and co-produced by The Jim Henson Company and Hallmark Entertainment, originally for the Nine Network. It premiered in North America on the Sci-Fi Channel's SciFi Friday segment on 19 March 1999 (at 8:00 pm EST), as the network's anchor series. The Jim Henson Company is credited with the many alien looks, make-up and prosthetics; two regular characters on the show, the animatronic puppets Rygel and Pilot, were entirely Henson Creature Shop creations.

Although the series was planned for five seasons, it was abruptly cancelled after production had ended on its fourth season, thus finishing the series on a cliffhanger. Co-producer Brian Henson later secured the rights to Farscape, paving the way for a three-hour miniseries, Farscape: The Peacekeeper Wars, which Henson himself directed. In 2007, it was announced that the creator was returning for a web series, though production was repeatedly delayed. As of 2026 no web series was ever released. In December 2008, a comic book miniseries was released, in-continuity with both the television show and the potential online series.

== Overview ==
Farscape features a diverse ensemble cast of characters who are initially escaping from corrupt authorities, namely the militaristic organization known as the Peacekeepers. The protagonists live inside a large bio-mechanical ship called Moya, which is a living entity. In the first episode, they are joined by the main character, John Crichton (Ben Browder), a modern-day American astronaut who accidentally flies into a wormhole near Earth during an experimental space flight. On the same day, another stranger is picked up by Moya: a Peacekeeper named Aeryn Sun (Claudia Black). Despite his best intentions, Crichton makes enemies, including the show's most prominent antagonist: Scorpius. There are a few standalone plots, and the show gradually unfolds progressive story arcs, beginning with the crew's recapture by the Peacekeepers, followed by Crichton's search for another wormhole back to Earth, and an eventual arms race for wormhole technology weapons. Secondary arcs explore how the characters change through their influences and adventures together, most notably Crichton's obsession with wormhole technology, his relationship with Aeryn, and the neural clone of Scorpius in his brain that haunts him.

== Production and broadcast ==
The series was originally conceived in the early 1990s by Rockne S. O'Bannon and Brian Henson under the title Space Chase. The series is told in a serialized format, with each episode involving a self-contained story while contributing to a larger storyline. Nearly the entire cast originates from Australia and New Zealand, except for American actor Ben Browder.

Farscape's characters frequently make use of slang such as "frell", "dren" and "hezmana" as a substitute for English expletives.

Farscape first ran on the Australian TV Channel Nine Network and in the US on the Sci-Fi Channel, and then on the YTV channel and on BBC Two in the United Kingdom. The series' original broadcast on Sci-Fi was noted for its erratic scheduling, with hiatuses lasting months often occurring mid-season. For example, the final four episodes of Season 1 aired beginning in January 2000, nearly four months after the broadcast of the preceding episode; the final four episodes of Season 3 were separated from the rest of the season by a gap of more than six months.

Each episode cost more than $1 million to make.

== Plot ==
=== Season One ===
Earth astronaut John Crichton is unexpectedly hurled to an unknown part of the Milky Way galaxy via a wormhole. He finds himself in the middle of an escape attempt by Moya, a living spaceship, from the militaristic Peacekeepers, who had been using her as a prison transport. In the chaos, Crichton's space capsule accidentally collides with a Peacekeeper fighter, which results in the death of its pilot. Crichton's ship and another Peacekeeper fighter are brought into Moya's hold. Although the escape is successful, the Peacekeeper Captain, Bialar Crais, fixates on Crichton as the murderer of the pilot—his brother—and begins a campaign to chase Crichton down.

The various crew have no common goal, each only wishing to go home. Unfortunately, to evade Crais' pursuit, they have to travel into the Uncharted Territories, and thus have no idea how to get home. The crew also has little respect for Crichton, seeing him only as a "primitive hoo-man" who does not understand even the basic tenets of life in space.

Various episodes explore the characters' backstories. Aeryn, the fighter pilot, begins to learn that the Peacekeepers are not always as correct as she had believed. Zhaan is forced to bring up the dark side she had worked to suppress. D'Argo admits he was framed for his wife's murder and has no idea where his child is. Rygel confronts his former jail keeper and torturer. A new character joins the crew, Chiana, a teenage thief on the run from her own repressive culture. And Moya herself becomes pregnant after a Peacekeeper experiment is accidentally activated.

Meanwhile, Crichton continues to research the wormhole that brought him here. He is forced to sell what little progress he has made to an alien mechanic as payment for repairs on the Farscape module. He is also lured into a wormhole that seems to lead directly back to Earth, only to find the entire situation is a construct created by mysterious aliens called the Ancients, who are testing to see if Earth is suitable for colonization.

Towards the end of the season, Aeryn is injured and the crew is forced to go to a Peacekeeper base to seek medical help. Crichton disguises himself as a Peacekeeper to gain access, but the base's commander, Scorpius, instantly sees through the ruse and imprisons Crichton, calling Crais to come collect him. Under torture, Crichton discovers that the Ancients placed specialized knowledge of wormholes in his subconscious mind—knowledge that Scorpius is particularly eager to access. The other Moya crew members launch a rescue attempt.

Meanwhile, Moya gives birth to her baby, discovering that the child, named Talyn, is a volatile hybrid warship designed by the Peacekeepers instead of the usual peaceful Leviathan. Upon Crais' arrival, Scorpius takes over his command. Crais defects to Moya to save himself, accepting along the way that Crichton had not meant to kill his brother. But this is only a cover to steal Talyn and escape on his own. Having grown much closer over the course of the season, the crew work together to escape Scorpius—a plan that ends with Crichton and D'Argo floating in space, running out of air.

=== Season Two ===
The crew of Moya are now on the run from Scorpius, who wants the wormhole knowledge locked in Crichton's brain for his own purposes. To avoid him the crew are forced into some unwise decisions and alliances, which often result in wacky, mind-altering hijinks for the crew.

Moya encounters an independent Sebacean colony (Sebaceans being the race from which Peacekeepers are drawn), where the heir to the throne has been genetically poisoned by her younger brother so that she cannot procreate with any Sebacean male, which would allow him to take the throne instead. Recognising Crichton as a possible substitute to ensure the continued independence of her world, the Empress insists he marry the Princess, or else she will hand him over to Scorpius. Terrified of Scorpius after his experiences on the base, Crichton is forced to agree. Aeryn, who has been growing attached to Crichton, finds herself jealous.

Despite various plots by Peacekeepers and an agent of their enemies the Scarrans, the Moya crew manage to wheedle their way out once again, although the Princess is indeed left pregnant. Meanwhile, D'Argo and Chiana begin a relationship based mostly on sex, and Zhaan is tasked with protecting Moya by the Leviathian's creator-gods. Crichton has a chance to kill Scorpius, but finds himself unable to do it, blocked by some unknown cause.

That cause is revealed when Crichton is kidnapped by Scarrans – during his torture on the base, Scorpius had implanted Crichton with a neural chip that contains a clone of his personality, designed to track down the wormhole knowledge and protect Crichton and Scorpius both until that knowledge is found. Crichton nicknames the clone Harvey and it begins to manifest as hallucinations to him.

The half-crazed mystic Stark – whom Crichton had met while jailed at the base – returns with information about D'Argo's son, Jothee. The boy is one of a lot of slaves, and they can rescue him by buying the entire lot. To afford to do that they will need to rob a bank. The crew put a plan into action, which is complicated when Scorpius arrives. Scorpius has captured the slaves, but promises to give them Jothee if Crichton will turn himself in. Under intense pressure from the neural clone, Crichton does so.

D'Argo is reunited with his son, Jothee, and the crew move into action to save Crichton. Even Crais and Talyn return to assist. The rescue is successful, although Moya is severely damaged and Crichton is nearly insane from the effects of the neural clone, Harvey. At the medical colony to fix them both, Harvey takes control of Crichton, seemingly killing Aeryn just as she admits her love for him. With Aeryn dead, Crichton wants the chip removed once and for all. At the same time, Scorpius catches up with them again, killing the doctor and announcing that the chip has completed its work and found the wormhole knowledge. He removes the chip and leaves Crichton incapacitated at the hospital.

=== Season Three ===
Having survived Scorpius' attack, the doctor saves Crichton by using biological material from a suitable donor – an alien called an Interon which may be a cousin species to humans. Scorpius fools Crais into thinking he is dead to cover his escape with the neural chip, and Zhaan revives Aeryn, but at the cost of her own life. Feeling guilty over the death of the Interon donor, Crichton has the donor's still living relative brought aboard – an arrogant scientist called Jool.

Investigating another wormhole, Moya crashes into a ship belonging to a race called Pathfinders, experts in wormholes. Zhaan sacrifices the last of her life to separate the ships, adding more guilt to Crichton's conscience. He also discovers that despite the chip's removal, the personality clone Harvey remains in his mind.

Due to a harrowing encounter with another escaped prisoner with a cloning device, Crichton ends up twinned – a duplicate created so that there are two Crichtons, both equal and original. Talyn is attacked by the new Peacekeeper Commando chasing the crew – Xhalax Sun, Aeryn's mother. To escape her, Moya and Talyn starburst in opposite directions, splitting the crew, with one Crichton on each ship.

On Moya, tensions rise over D'Argo's breakup with Chiana, Jool's grating personality, and Crichton's increasing obsession with wormholes. An encounter with an alien Energy Rider also instils precognitive abilities in Chiana (or possibly only activates already present abilities). Meanwhile, Scorpius tries to access the wormhole date, but finds that the chip now contains a neural clone of Crichton, who refuses to allow Scorpius access.

On Talyn, Crais explains that Xhalax wants to recapture him as a renegade Peacekeeper, and to recapture Talyn as a powerful warship. After a vicious battle, Aeryn allows Crais to kill her mother. Crichton discovers that the mechanic, Furlow, has been working on the wormhole data he gave her in the first season, and intends to sell it to the Scarrans. With the help of the Ancients, Crichton unlocks the wormhole knowledge just enough to destroy the Scarran ship, but suffers radiation exposure and dies in Aeryn's arms.

When the two crews finally reunite, Aeryn cannot face the remaining Crichton, and Talyn is becoming increasingly violent and uncontrollable. Crichton resolves to destroy the wormhole information that Scorpius has by pretending to help him and then crippling the project from within. In return for his help, Scorpius grants the Moya crew leniency for their crimes. But high-ranking Peacekeeper Commandant Grayza interferes, claiming that the Moya crew's continued freedom is an embarrassment and Scorpius' own obsession with wormhole tech does not outweigh their criminal record.

Crichton finally decides that the only way to end Scorpius' project is to destroy the ship. Crais orders Talyn to starburst inside the ship, killing them both and destroying the entire Command Carrier. Believing they are finally free from pursuit, the crew buries Talyn's remains and splits up to go their own ways. But at the last second, a strange old woman formerly imprisoned on the Command Carrier informs Crichton that Aeryn is pregnant, and Moya is sucked into a wormhole, leaving Crichton once again alone in space.

=== Season Four ===
Alone for months, Crichton has had nothing to do but obsess over Aeryn and wormholes. He finally makes a breakthrough on the latter when he meets a supposed Leviathan specialist, Sikozu, on the run from her employers. When Chiana and Rygel also return, they go together to Arnessk, where Jool, D'Argo and the old woman – Noranti – have joined an Interon archaeological dig. They find artefacts that suggest a connection between humans, Sebaceans and Interons. Commandant Grayza interrupts, having taken Scorpius prisoner and "kills" him to show good faith to Crichton. Crichton wants nothing to do with her and escapes.

Crichton finds that Aeryn has made a deal with Scorpius to let him on Moya after he saved her life. Crichton keeps Scorpius imprisoned but remains paranoid that his former enemy is planning something. Despite Aeryn's desire to reconcile, he pushes her away, even going so far as to suppress his feelings with drugs. A Scarran agent invades Moya, since the Scarrans and Peacekeepers are in an arms race to acquire Crichton's wormhole knowledge.

Crichton is instead kidnapped by an Ancient whom he nicknames Einstein, who explains to him the catastrophic danger if wormhole tech falls into the wrong hands. Returning from that meeting, the entire Moya crew accidentally ends up on Earth, providing humans with their first confirmed contact with extraterrestrials and alien technology. Crichton is finally home but finds that the world is too paranoid and distrustful to accept his alien friends due to 9/11 and the fact that the US government only wants to monopolize alien tech and knowledge for global domination. He has also been so affected by his experiences that he cannot relax there – a situation not helped when an agent of Grayza attacks and kills several of Crichton's friends. He decides the only thing he can do is leave again but he succeeds in convincing his father to make alien tech and knowledge to be shared equally globally much to the dismay of the US government.

The crew comes across a secret meeting between Grayza and a Scarran minister, at which Grayza sells out D'Argo's people in return for peace. In disrupting the meeting Aeryn is captured. Desperate to rescue her, Crichton promises to give Scorpius the wormhole tech in return for his help. They infiltrate a Scarran base and rescue Aeryn but Scorpius is captured in the attempt. Crichton is happy to leave him there but the neural clone Harvey informs them that Scorpius already has the wormhole tech and may reveal it to the Scarrans under torture. The crew of Moya are forced to launch yet another attempt to either rescue or kill Scorpius.

They walk into another meeting at the Scarrans' most important base, Katratzi, claiming to want to sell the tech to the highest bidder. Instead they start a riot between the Scarrans' various servant races, blow up the base using a nuclear bomb and escape again. The Scarrans launch an attack against Earth – partly in retaliation but also to secure a source of Strelitzia plants. The plants are vital to a Scarran augmentation process and Crichton had inadvertently revealed to the Scarrans that they can be found on Earth. The peacekeepers promise to protect Earth in exchange for allegiance but Crichton disagrees since it means dragging humanity into perpetual war between two galactic powers. Crichton's only option to save his home world is to destroy the wormhole that leads there, leaving him stranded in space forever. Before destroying the wormhole, he says goodbye to his father and reveals that he has put a recording on the Moon near the site of the first Moon landing, containing technological data necessary for humanity to reach the stars in the future and protect themselves against alien threat.

That done, Scorpius returns to the Peacekeepers and the Moya crew go to the ocean planet Qujaga to recover. While there, Aeryn reveals that the pregnancy – formerly kept in stasis – has now been released and they are going to have a baby. Crichton proposes to her and she accepts. At the last second they are attacked by random aliens, who appear to kill them both.

=== The Peacekeeper Wars ===
Thinking that Crichton is dead and the wormhole tech gone with him, Scorpius deliberately starts a war with the Scarrans in the hope that the element of surprise will be on their side. The tactic is unsuccessful, and the Scarrans are on the verge of overwhelming the Peacekeepers. When the Peacekeeper Grand Chancellor considers surrender, Grayza kills him and takes over to make sure the war continues.

On Qujaga the aliens, called Eidolons, realise that killing Crichton and Aeryn was a mistake and reanimate them. Scorpius instantly realizes this and abandons the war to track him down, hoping to acquire the wormhole tech once and for all as the only way of stopping the Scarrans. Crichton again refuses. Meanwhile, the crew discover that the Eidolons are in fact a lost colony of the people of Arnessk, and have an innate ability to bring peace to others. If they can find more of their people, they will be able to stop the war.

Moya, with Scorpius and Sikozu in tow, heads back to Arnessk, where the ancient people have been revived and are working with Jool. They agree to help, but Scarran Emperor Staleek attacks, destroying the base and killing Jool. Staleek doesn't want peace – he wants victory. Only one Eidolon remains, who is able to transmit the ability to Stark, and the crew escape the Scarrans with the help of D'Argo's son Jothee.

They return to Qujaga to find that the Peacekeeper-Scarran war has reached the planet. Crichton and the others must get through the battle to reach the remaining Eidolons on the planet and pass the techniques of peace to them, all while both sides are still after him for wormhole technology. Once there, Crichton and Aeryn are finally able to marry and Aeryn gives birth, but D'Argo is fatally wounded in the escape and dies offscreen.

Realising that neither side will take no for an answer, Crichton returns to Einstein and convinces him to unlock the knowledge, which Crichton then uses to launch a wormhole weapon – a black hole that will grow and grow until it destroys everything in the universe. Both Grayza and Staleek finally realize that this weapon is too dangerous for anyone to possess, and they agree to a ceasefire. Crichton is able to stop the black hole, but falls into a coma as a result.

With the war finally over, the Eidolons help broker a peace treaty between the two sides, but Crichton is still in a coma. He is finally brought out of it when Aeryn places his new baby in his arms. The new family looks out onto the now peaceful galaxy, naming the baby D'Argo in honour of their friend, and promising the universe belongs to him.

== Characters ==
=== Main characters ===
From left to right: Bialar Crais, Rygel XVI (front), Chiana, Zhaan, Aeryn Sun, John Crichton, Ka D'Argo.

- Ben Browder as John Crichton – An astronaut from present-day Earth. At the start of the series, a test flight involving an experimental spacecraft of his own design dubbed Farscape I goes awry, propelling Crichton through a wormhole to a distant part of the universe. He quickly runs afoul of the Peacekeepers and is recovered by the crew of Moya, a living ship which is the main setting for Farscape.
- Claudia Black as Aeryn Sun – A renegade Peacekeeper officer. At the start of the series, she is stripped of her rank and marked for death for spending too much time near a (culturally) "contaminated" being. This decision is further backed later after she protects Crichton. Trained as a soldier since birth, she initially seems to lack any emotions or empathy. Her severance from the Peacekeepers allows Aeryn to discover her compassionate nature.
- Anthony Simcoe as Ka D'Argo – An ill-tempered Luxan warrior of impressive stature. He was imprisoned by the Peacekeepers for killing his wife, a crime for which he was falsely convicted. He carries a weapon called a Qualta Blade, a broadsword capable of transforming into a rifle.
- Virginia Hey as Pa'u Zotoh Zhaan (Main seasons 1–3; guest season 4) – A bald, blue-skinned female who belongs to a plant species, named Delvians. Once a Priestess of her religious order, Zhaan murdered her lover after discovering he was a Peacekeeper collaborator. Regarded as an anarchist by her captors, she was jailed along with D'Argo and Rygel. Like other members of her species, Zhaan is an empath; she can share "unity" with other beings (two minds in one body, they can share thoughts, sensations, etc.) As a Pa'u (priestess), she is able to share pain with another being.
- Moya – Moya is a Leviathan, the fifth generation of these living ships. She was born in freedom, captured by Leviathan Hunters and sold to the Peacekeepers for them to use as a prison transport. She is a great and powerful ship, with no weapons. In communication with and taken care of by Pilot, the enormous living entity that is symbiotically fused to her, Moya has adjusted to her new inhabitants and has been able to trust them enough to become their home. Like Pilot, she is anxious to serve her crew, but not at the expense of her own agenda. Her natural instincts to protect all life, however, do override her personal fear of pain and suffering.
- Dominar Rygel XVI (voiced by Jonathan Hardy) – A diminutive creature who was once ruler of the Hynerian Empire. He was deposed by his treacherous cousin and handed over to the Peacekeepers. When nervous, Rygel flatulates helium – often causing his annoyed crew mates to complain in high-pitched voices. Rygel is one of two puppet characters who regularly appear on Farscape.
- Pilot (voiced by Lani Tupu) – A multi-limbed creature who acts as the ship's pilot. He is biologically connected to Moya's nervous system and also serves as her voice to the crew. Pilot is portrayed by an animatronic puppet (operated by John Eccleston, Matthew McCoy, Dave Collins, Sean Masterson, Graeme Haddon, and Tim Mieville).
- Gigi Edgley as Chiana (Main seasons 2–4; Recurring season 1) – A mercurial thief and con artist. She is a Nebari, a grey/blue-skinned species whose society is heavily regimented by a governmental body called "The Establishment". Chiana's rebellious nature made her a leading candidate for reprogramming (euphemistically known as "cleansing").
- Paul Goddard as Stark (Main season 3; Recurring seasons 1–2, 4) – A Stykera, a specialized subrace of the Banik, who was first encountered by Crichton at the end of the first season. Stark wears a half-mask – strapped to his head by two buckles – of an unidentified metal, covering an incorporeal area that glows dark orange when uncovered, on the right side of his face. He only reveals his face when he is taking away someone's pain or "crossing over" a soul – aiding or comforting a person prior to their death. He is also mentally unbalanced, a trait that gets on the nerves of many on Moya.
- Lani Tupu as Bialar Crais (Main seasons 2–3; Recurring season 1) – The initial antagonist of the series, a Peacekeeper Captain who relentlessly hunts Moya and its crew. He is driven by the death of his brother, a prowler pilot who accidentally collided with Crichton's ship when it exited the wormhole. At the end of the first season, Crais is usurped by Scorpius. Crais mentally bonds with Moya's offspring Talyn and becomes something of an ally to the crew in later seasons.
- Wayne Pygram as Scorpius (Main seasons 3–4; Recurring seasons 1–2) – A commander of the Peacekeeper forces. Scorpius is a hybrid created from the forced mating of a human-like Sebacean woman and a reptilian Scarran male. At a young age he escaped the Scarrans and, when he learned of his origin, chose to side with the Sebacean Peacekeepers. He is obsessed with extracting the secret of wormhole technology from Crichton, believing it to be crucial to an unavoidable war between the Peacekeeper and Scarran races. His motives are dominated by revenge and personal hatred of the Scarrans, because they kidnapped his mother to be raped by their brutish males for an experiment in cross-species reproduction, and she died as he was born. He was the only surviving child of many attempts with different Sebacean women, and thus has the unique burden of possessing both the Scarrans' painfully high body temperature and the Sebaceans' sensitivity to heat. After reaching adulthood he had a cooling mechanism implanted in his head, before which he was physically weakened by his own heat. He also has a unique ability to see thermal signatures of other beings which enables him to spot deception and to identify species.

=== Recurring characters ===
As the series progressed, a revolving cast of characters joined the crew of Moya.

- Captain Miklo Braca (David Franklin) – Captain Miklo Braca usually serves as a subordinate to most of the series' villains, acting as second-in-command for Crais, Scorpius, and Grayza at various times. As once described by Crais (although it was clearly intended as an insult), Braca is "a consummate Peacekeeper", performing his duties to the very best of his abilities for whoever his commanding officer is, although his loyalties remain with Scorpius due to a shared view of relations with the Scarrans and contempt for Grayza's misplaced hopes for peace with them.
- Commandant Mele-on Grayza (Rebecca Riggs) – A new antagonist that debuts in Season 3. She is a manipulative Peacekeeper who aims to put an end to Scorpius' wormhole research. Ruthless and ambitious, she has a gland implanted in her chest that secretes a substance which bends men to her will.
- Jool (Tammy MacIntosh) – Jool is an orange-haired academic who appears sporadically throughout seasons three and four. When frightened or enraged, her hair becomes red and her screams can melt metal.
- Sikozu (Raelee Hill) – Sikozu is a brilliant Kalish who joins the crew at the beginning of the fourth season. Hard-edged and dangerous, she gradually allies herself with Scorpius. In "The Peacekeeper Wars" she is discovered to be collaborating with the Scarrans.
- Noranti (played by Melissa Jaffer) – Noranti (Utu Noranti Pralatong) debuts in "Dogs with Two Bones". where she suddenly appears amongst the crew as a mysterious and eccentric refugee that escaped to Moya along with an unidentified group of others as a Peacekeeper Command Carrier was being destroyed. The "Old Woman", as she is called, is a Traskan, and little is known of her past before she joined the crew. Initially appearing to Crichton and Chiana as a grateful cook, she later describes herself as a "doctor, instructor, and among many other disciplines … negotiator". She is basically portrayed as an accomplished herbalist. Although her skills are sometimes not quite as successful as she would like, she does manage to come to the crew's rescue with odd potions and powders on many occasions. At times, she seems to have her own agenda, although what that agenda may be is never quite made clear. At 293 cycles (years) old, she sometimes appears to the others as being slightly senile, and is often referred to as "Grandma" by Crichton. She was featured throughout Season 4 of Farscape, as well as being in "The Peacekeeper Wars", where she realizes the existence of more Eidolons and convinces Crichton to seek to reawaken their powers to help end the war. An alternative reality version of Noranti appeared in the Season 4 episode, "Unrealized Reality", and was portrayed by Gigi Edgley.

== Reception ==
=== Awards and distinctions ===
Between 2000 and 2002, Farscape won three Saturn Awards for Best Syndicated/Cable TV Series and one Best TV Actor (Browder). Additionally, in 1999, it received nominations for Best TV Actress (Claudia Black) and Saturn Award for Best Supporting Actress on Television (Virginia Hey). In 2002, it received nominations for Best TV Actress (Black), Best Supporting TV Actor (Anthony Simcoe), and Best Supporting TV Actress (Gigi Edgley).

On 14 July 2005, Farscape: The Peacekeeper Wars received a Primetime Emmy nomination for Outstanding Special Visual Effects for a Miniseries, Movie or a Special. In 2004 and 2007, Farscape was ranked #4 on TV Guide's Top Cult Shows Ever.

In 2012, Entertainment Weekly listed the show at #22 in the "25 Best Cult TV Shows from the Past 25 Years," calling it "one of the trippiest space sagas ever, with portions of some episodes taking place in Crichton's subconscious" and remarking, "Before Battlestar Galactica popularized frak as geek slang, there was Farscape's very liberal use of frell."

EmpireOnline ranked it #45 of "the 50 greatest TV shows of all time" in February 2013.

=== Cancellation ===
In September 2002, the Sci-Fi Channel (then-owned by Vivendi Universal) opted to withdraw its funding of the fifth season, canceling the show, just before the first half of the fourth season finished airing. The Sci-Fi Channel concluded that the series was too expensive to renew, as ratings had declined during the fourth season. Furthermore, The Jim Henson Company had been acquired by EM.TV & Merchandising AG in 2000 and by 2002 they were experiencing significant financial difficulties. According to the DVD featurette "Save Farscape", Henson, Kemper, and Ben Browder announced the cancellation during an online chat with fans, and within hours fans had mounted a campaign to restore the show or transfer it to another network. Early plans to scrap the sets after production were postponed after news of the cancellation broke, partly as a result of the fan campaign. The sets were put in storage pending a possible future revival of the show.

Cartoonist Bill Amend, creator of the syndicated comic strip FoxTrot, addressed the series' cancellation in an 8 October 2002 strip wherein the character Jason Fox petitioned to have the Sci-Fi channel renew Farscape. Soon after the strip ran, Amend remarked that it "generated more e-mails from readers than anything else I've done in the past. I had no idea that so many people owned computers, even I shudder to think what the mail boxes at the Sci-Fi Channel must be like these days."

The 2010 DVD release of the series on A&E Home Video includes footage of producer David Kemper addressing the cast on the final day of shooting, in which he read a draft of a column for TV Guide by critic Matt Roush, who wrote that, in his opinion, the premature cancellation of Farscape will be looked upon by future generations in the same light as science fiction fans look upon NBC's cancellation of the original Star Trek in 1969.

Farscape's cancellation received considerable notice by news media. Thanks to the attention generated by the fan campaign, various financial backers in Europe offered their support to Brian Henson, and in 2004, The Jim Henson Company produced a three-hour miniseries to wrap up the series storyline entitled Farscape: The Peacekeeper Wars.

=== Analysis ===
Farscape aired at a time when Star Trek was in decline. Farscape, like the later Firefly and Battlestar Galactica (2004), was a spaceship-centered show that sought to distance itself from the Star Trek formula. Farscape featured a main character who constantly riffed on pop culture and a diverse cast of criminal fugitives; the series began as relatively unconnected episodes, but in later seasons transitioned into a complex plot with a dense mythology. Some reviewers, such as The A.V. Club, praised the animatronic puppetry. Others, such as Entertainment Weekly, were initially put off by the puppets and by the show as a whole. Space.com called it "unlike anything that had come before it... bold, brilliant and a little bonkers". According to a Vice reviewer, the show was ahead of its time in terms of feminist sci-fi.

James Gunn has credited Farscape as an inspiration for his Guardians of the Galaxy films.

=== Stargate SG-1 parody/homage ===
Following the series' cancellation, Ben Browder and Claudia Black were both cast as series regulars on Stargate SG-1 during its final two seasons. At the start of season nine, when Black's character (Vala Mal Doran) first meets Browder's character (Cameron Mitchell), she tells him: "I know we haven't met. That I'm sure I would remember."

In the 200th episode of the series, which was entitled "200", Vala, an alien who develops a skewed interest in Earth pop culture, pitches an idea for a film to a producer, who immediately recognises it as The Wizard of Oz. After pitching a second idea which the producer recognises as Gilligan's Island, he advises her that if she is going to rip something off, it should be something more obscure. This leads into a parody of Farscape, with Black reprising her role of Aeryn Sun, and various SG-1 characters dressed as D'Argo, Stark, Chiana, and Rygel. Daniel Jackson (Michael Shanks) stands in for John Crichton, an in-joke referencing the resemblance between Browder and Shanks. Shanks was originally intended to play Stark in the episode, with Browder reprising the role of Crichton, but the parts were switched the day before filming at the behest of the actors. The scene also parodies the wide array of pseudo-swear words used in the show. The producer recognises all the stories that Black's character proposes, until she pitches the Farscape pastiche. As an in-joke, he says: "Okay. You got me. I have no idea what that is."

== Multimedia ==
=== DVD releases ===
For Region 1 releases, AD Vision originally issued Farscape in a series of two-episode discs for the first season, then two-disc volumes, five volumes per season for the remaining three, which were later collected into full season box sets. They later re-released the series in larger four-disc volumes under the "Starburst Edition" moniker, three volumes per season with additional extras not available on the original volume sets. All of these sets are long out of print.

Farscape: The Peacekeeper Wars was released to DVD in January 2005 by Lions Gate Entertainment.

A&E Home Video released a Farscape Complete Series Collection and individual season sets. It includes a two-disc collection of featurettes, most of which were recycled from ADV's old DVD sets but notably adding Farscape Undressed, a Farscape special that was created between the second and third seasons to catch up fans on the events that had happened up to that point. The Peacekeeper Wars is not included in the complete series set because Lions Gate still retains the rights to the miniseries although upon its release, US retailer Best Buy had a limited number of complete series sets which did include The Peacekeeper Wars as a store exclusive. The two miniseries discs were identical to those of the normal Lions Gate release and were included in the last DVD case along with the two discs of bonus material that normally come with the complete series set.

The Region 2 and Region 4 box sets contain Seasons 1–4 as well as the Peacekeeper Wars television film.

=== Blu-ray release ===
All four seasons were released on Blu-ray in North America and Europe on 15 November 2011 by New Video/A&E. The four seasons were released in a choice of complete boxed set or individual seasons in North America, and as a boxed set only in Europe. As the original 35mm prints used to create the series are missing, 576i/25 frames per second PAL master videotapes were used as the source material to create the transfer. Software algorithms were used to upscale the standard definition image to Blu-ray's 1080p resolution specification. The audio on the Blu-ray release is uncompressed DTS Master Audio, improving on the previous compressed Dolby Digital tracks on DVD.

Like the previous DVD release, owing to licensing issues, the set does not include Farscape: The Peacekeeper Wars.

As with the U.S. DVD reissue in 2009, there are 31 commentary tracks and all the special features were carried over from the previously released DVD editions. The Blu-ray release also includes a recently filmed exclusive HD featurette, "Memories of Moya", featuring interviews with the cast and production staff as they reminisce about their time on Farscape.

On November 5, 2013, a 15th anniversary set was released on Blu-ray.

On November 19, 2019, a second Blu-ray set was released, this time by Sony Pictures Home Entertainment, and this time, it included Farscape: The Peacekeeper Wars, but excluding the comic included in A&E's 2013 Blu-ray release.

On November 21, 2023, a third Blu-ray set was released, this time by Shout! Studios.

=== Other releases ===
In January 2008, seasons 1 and 2 were made available for download through Apple's iTunes Store for customers in the United States. Season 3 was added in March 2008, with Season 4 following in May. The episodes can be purchased individually or as entire seasons. The Farscape: The Peacekeeper Wars miniseries has yet to be made available through iTunes.

Beginning in January 2011, seasons one through four were also available on the Netflix "Watch Instantly" service. As of 1 January 2013, seasons one through four were no longer available on Netflix, as they unexpectedly did not renew. However, from 11 November 2013 through 5 November 2016, all four seasons were once again available for online streaming. The miniseries Farscape: The Peacekeeper Wars is also available from Netflix on DVD. As of February 2, 2014, Hulu offered two of the four seasons on their streaming service as well.

As of August 2023, all four seasons as well as Farscape: The Peacekeeper Wars are available on various streaming platforms like Tubi, YouTube PrimeTime, Xumo TV & Peacock. They are also continually broadcast on the Farscape channel on Sling TV, Shout Factory TV and others.

The running order of the first half of the first season on Netflix is different from the DVD release. While there are times when shows are broadcast in a different order from what was intended and they then try to correct many years later for the sake of building up stories and characters, but for continuity, it would seem that the DVD releases are proper as opposed to Netflix. One specific instance is that D'Argo's Qualta blade is transformed as a munitions weapon by the second or third episode from the Netflix release, yet several episodes later, that was revealed for the first time that it had that ability.

=== Webisodes ===
For a time after the cancelation of the TV series, there were plans for webisodes. On 15 July 2007, it was announced that Farscape would return in ten webisode installments. The episodes are expected to be a few minutes long each and may eventually be broadcast on the Sci Fi Channel. The webisodes were to have been launched as early as fall 2007. In an interview with TV Guide, Brian Henson stated that the webisodes will be 3–6 minutes long and may feature John and Aeryn's son, D'Argo Sun-Crichton. TV Guide also reported that Ben Browder was in talks to appear in the webisodes. Sci-Fi Wire reported that Brian Henson and Rockne O'Bannon would pen the episodes.

Several news sources reported that the web series could lead to an on-air revival of the series, but Sci Fi general manager Dave Howe said that there were no plans to revive the show. Brian Henson stated that he hoped the webisodes would lead to a TV sequel.

The 2008 writers' strike put a damper on the plans, and Browder said that it was too early to figure out to what extent he would be involved. At Comic-Con 2008, Rockne O'Bannon announced that the ongoing Farscape comic series would tie into the upcoming webisodes. The first comic was scheduled for release in November 2008. On 4 December 2008, O'Bannon told MTV "There's a new character that you'll meet in the very first comic book who ends up a significant player in the webisodes. Villain or hero? I'm not saying!"

On 10 June 2009, Maureen Ryan of the Chicago Tribune announced via Twitter, "Farscape webisodes are 'still in play.' they're still being developed but not yet at script stage."

At the 2009 San Diego Comic-Con, Brian Henson stated that the webisodes were "ready to go" but that they were still looking for financing on the project.

At the 10th Anniversary Farscape Convention in Los Angeles, 2009, Brian Henson again stated that they are still waiting for funding. Ben Browder was asked how the fans could help with funding, and said he wasn't sure what could be done.

The "Final Frelling Farscape Convention", was held on 17 November 2011 at the Marriott LAX hotel in Los Angeles.

in 2012, a SYFY exec tweeted that the minisodes would not be financed. As of 2026, no webisodes have been released.

=== Minisodes ===
Chris Hardwick of The Nerdist Podcast announced in March 2012 that The Nerdist YouTube channel would host re-cut Farscape episodes in the form of minisodes. The first minisode, hosted by Ben Browder, went online on 14 July 2012.

== Literature ==
Boxtree in the UK and Tor Books in the U.S. published three Farscape novels: House of Cards by Keith R.A. DeCandido, Dark Side of the Sun by Andrew Dymond, and Ship of Ghosts by David Bischoff. A fourth novel was commissioned to be written by DeCandido but did not surface after the show's cancellation.

Scott K. Andrews' Uncharted Territory: An Unauthorised and Unofficial Guide To Farscape (Virgin Publishing 2002, ISBN 0-7535-0704-8) covered Farscape's first three seasons exhaustively. Paul Simpson wrote The Illustrated Farscape Companion series for Titan Books, one book per season (Book 1 with David Hughes; Books 2 and 3 with photographer Ruth Thomas) with exclusive official content.

The Creatures of Farscape: Inside Jim Henson's Creature Shop, released in 2004, offered a colorful look inside the famous creature shop that created the stunning array of creatures and make-up effects. It includes previously unseen and behind the scenes images, exclusive contributions from the show's stars and make-up artists, and a foreword by executive producer Brian Henson.

Farscape Forever! Sex, Drugs and Killer Muppets released 28 September 2005; in which Science fiction and fantasy authors analyse several aspects of the TV series. Contributors include Martha Wells on characters Crichton and D'Argo's buddy relationship, P. N. Elrod on the villains she loves to hate, and Justina Robson on sex, pleasure, and feminism. Topics range from a look at how Moya was designed and an examination of vulgarity and bodily functions to a tourist's budget guide to the Farscape universe.

Shortly after season 3 began airing, Titan Magazines released a Farscape magazine. Available bi-monthly, the magazine was published from April/May 2001 through the 12th issue of April/May 2003. The magazine had a in-depth material, including interviews with the cast and crew, behind the scenes information on many episodes, original fiction (by O'Bannon, DeCandido, Greg Cox, John Kenneth Muir, and others), and a regular column by David Kemper. There were two versions of the magazine produced each issue, with the only difference being the front cover, and the magazine also had two special issues—a season 3 special (issue 7), and the final issue (issue 12) containing an episode guide for the four seasons to date, as well as sketches for ideas and the Horizons fiction.

=== "Horizons" fiction ===
In the final issue of its run, the Farscape magazine published a piece of fiction written by series creator Rockne S. O'Bannon. Set a long time after the end of the fourth season, this details the subsequent adventures of the Moya crew. Since "Horizons" was written before the Peacekeeper Wars miniseries, there are some plot inconsistencies.

=== Comics ===
==== Wildstorm Productions ====
Farscape: War Torn first issue This file has been proposed for deletion and may be deleted after Wednesday, 25 November 2026. Click on file page link to object.

During 2002, Wildstorm Productions produced a two-part Farscape comic entitled "War Torn", with the first part available in April and the second in May. The comics featured two stories, each spanning both issues. "War Torn", the main story, featured the Moya crew becoming ensnared in a war between two planets over a third, and took up roughly three quarters of the comic. "Fourth Horseman – featuring Chiana" was a Chiana-only story as she came across old friends and foes on the run from the Nebari. Both stories seem to have been set during Season 2. The second issue also included a double-page spread of some of the preliminary sketches.

==== BOOM! Studios ====
Farscape returned to the comic form in 2008 through a partnership between The Jim Henson Company and BOOM! Studios that fit into established Farscape canon following The Peacekeeper Wars. Three 4-issue miniseries (The Beginning of the End of the Beginning, Strange Detractors, and Gone and Back) were published from December 2008 through June 2009 before a monthly Farscape series began in July 2009. The ongoing series ran for 24 issues over four story arcs: Tangled Roots (4 issues), Red Sky at Morning (4 issues), Compulsions (4 issues), and The War for the Uncharted Territories (12 issues).

In addition to the main series, BOOM! also published three 4-issue miniseries between April 2009 and March 2010 under the Farscape: Uncharted Tales title. D'Argo's Lament took place during the third season of the television series while D'Argo's Trial and D'Argo's Quest took place between the third and fourth seasons.

Following the conclusion of Uncharted Tales, BOOM! published an 8-issue miniseries titled Farscape: Scorpius from April 2010 through November 2010 which takes place concurrently with the main comic series and ends with a crossover between the two titles.

The 4-issue story arc series were published in a hardcover format in 2009. Later stories were published in a softcover format in 2011.

A 25th anniversary one-shot comic was published in August 2024.

== Games ==
A video game based on the television series was produced by Red Lemon Studios and released mid-2002 for Microsoft Windows. Set during the first season, the game featured voice acting by the original cast of the television series. Reviews of the game, however, were generally negative, with many reviewers citing poor gameplay mechanics.

A Farscape table-top role-playing game was released by Alderac Entertainment Group in 2002. It uses the d20 System and includes creatures not appearing in the established television universe. The game also features an original short story by Keith R. A. DeCandido set during the first season, after the episode "The Flax" and entitled "Ten Little Aliens". The game was nominated for ENNIE awards for Best Graphic Design and Layout and Best d20 Game in 2003.

== Continuation ==
In February 2014, it was reported that a screenplay for a new Farscape film was in development. At WonderCon in April 2014, Rockne S. O'Bannon confirmed to Nerdacy that a Farscape film is in development but in very early stages. In an interview with The Paley Center for Media in late 2017, O'Bannon confirmed that work on a film is still ongoing.

In August 2018, in an interview by Den of Geek, Brian Henson spoke about what was preventing the return of Farscape, stating: "I've been trying really hard with Farscape. And I'm going to keep trying. It's just not quite right still." He added, "It's one of those instances where it's us, the creators, who need to keep working on it. And feeling no: that didn't work that time. No, it's still not quite working. It's really down to us."

At the 2018 Jim Henson's Creature Shop Challenge Live!, Brian Henson said:

The fan interest has been huge, but it's a little harder to sell. BUT—I've been trying to make it as a movie for a long time, and everybody is tired—OK I'm tired—of hearing me say that I really want to make a feature film of Farscape. I'm just coming off of making this movie [The Happytime Murders] and it really took all of my attention for 16 months. I'm reconsidering that, and it may be that the movie length is too short to tell the story. So that might mean, I may consider doing something on TV instead. Sort of exactly like what we're doing in London right now with Dark Crystal [The Dark Crystal: Age of Resistance].... So there is the potential of doing something like that with Farscape. Honestly? I'm still very enthusiastic about Farscape, and I have been trying to make it into a movie, but I'm not sure I'll be able to succeed.
